= Palazzo della Società Anonima Edile Torinese =

- Click on the map for a fullscreen view

General information
- Location: Turin, Italy
- Coordinates: 45°04′11.3″N 7°40′41.94″E

Design and construction
- Architect: Giuseppe Momo

The Palazzo della Società Anonima Edile Torinese is a historic building located in Turin, Italy.

== History ==
The building, on the right, in the 1930s

Construction of the building, commissioned by the Società Anonima Edile Torinese and designed by architect Giuseppe Momo, began in 1928 and was completed in 1930. Originally, the commercial premises on the ground floor housed a FIAT car dealership.

== Description ==
Located at the corner of Piazza Solferino and Via Santa Teresa, the building features an Art Deco architectural style, in which functional and structural rationality is combined with meticulous attention to decorative detail. Its façades blend a geometric, modern design with an elaborate ornamental scheme consisting of mouldings, decorative motifs and sculptural elements.

Two sculptural groups are positioned alongside the triangular pediments of the two outermost first-floor windows. The group on the right depicts a male figure holding a cornucopia, standing beside a mother and child. The group on the left portrays a woman with braids resting on her chest and a bare-chested male figure holding a large sledgehammer in his right hand.
