= Santa Monica degli Agostiniani =

- Augustinian Chapel of Saint Monica
- Cappella Santa Monica degli Agostiniani
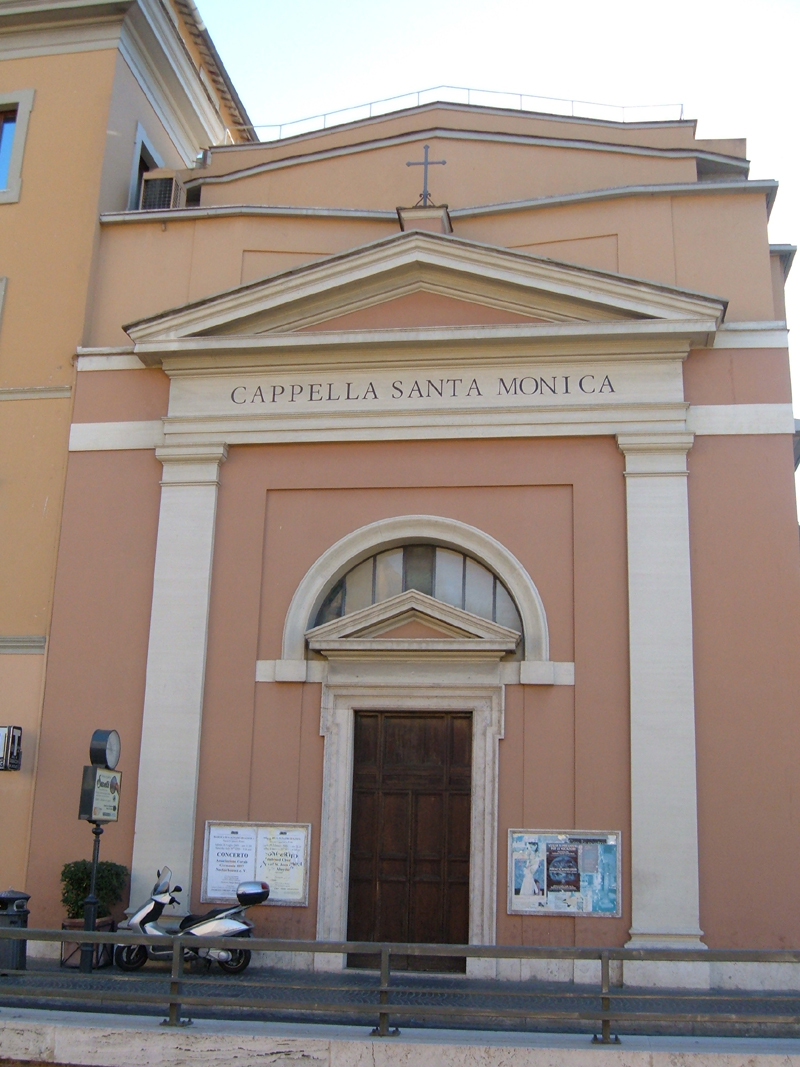

- Location within Rome Location within Rome
- 41°54′02″N 12°27′24″E
- Location: Piazza del Sant’Uffizio 8, Borgo, Rome
- Country: Italy
- Language: Italian
- Denomination: Catholic
- Tradition: Roman Rite
- Religious order: Augustinian

History
- Status: titular church
- Dedication: Saint Monica
- Consecrated: 1941

Architecture
- Functional status: active
- Architect(s): Giuseppe Momo and Silvio Galizia
- Architectural type: Rationalist
- Completed: 1941

Administration
- Diocese: Rome

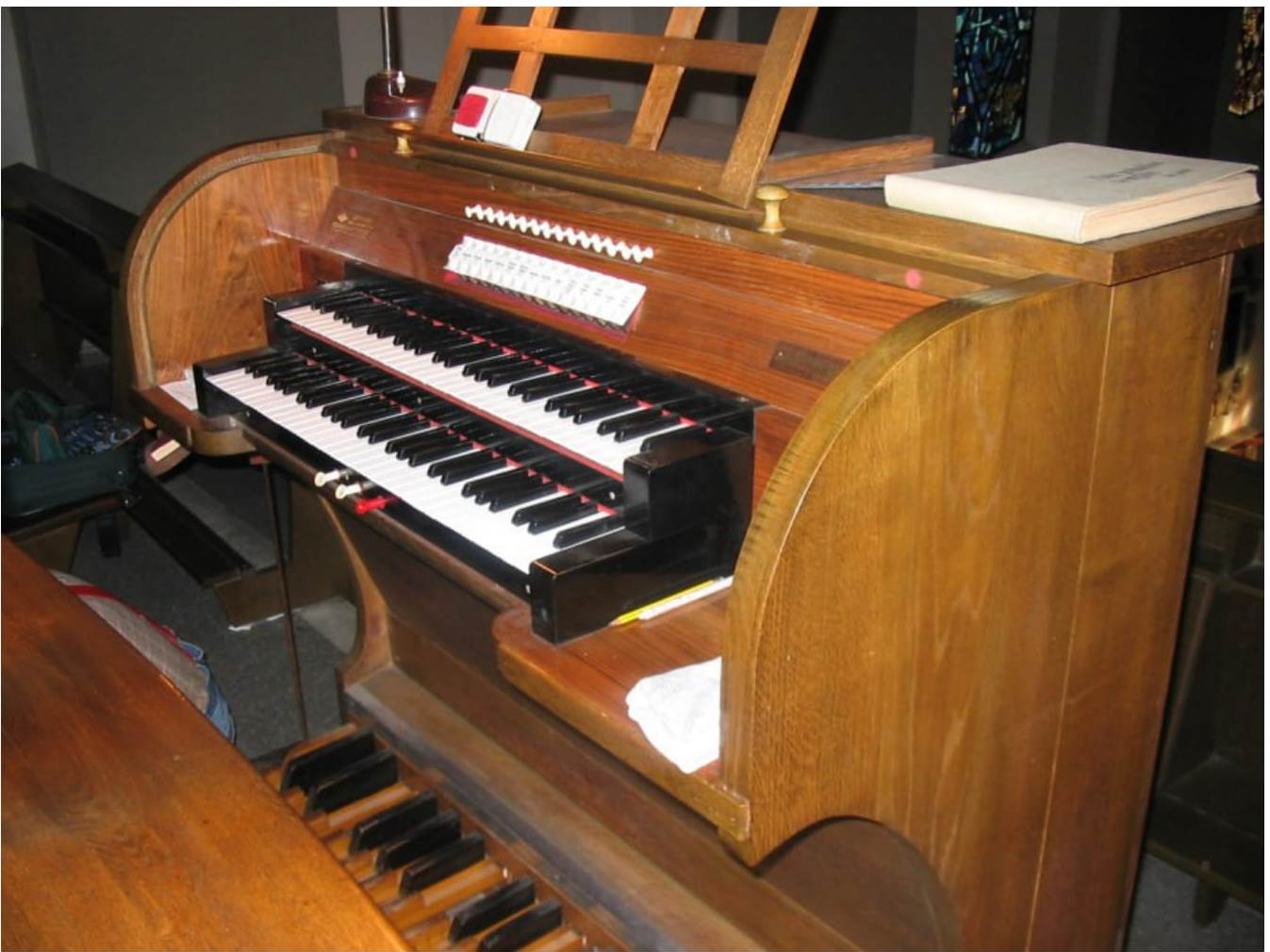
Pipe organ

The Chapel of Santa Monica degli Agostiniani (Saint Monica of the Augustinians) is a 20th-century Augustinian titular church in central Rome, immediately south of the Vatican, dedicated to Saint Monica.

== History ==
Santa Monica was designed by Giuseppe Momo and completed in 1941. It serves the Augustinians working at the community's International College as well as their General Curia.

On 30 September 2023, it was made a titular church to be held by a cardinal-deacon. Robert Prevost (now Pope Leo XIV) served as its cardinal-protector until his elevation to become Cardinal Bishop of Albano on 6 February 2025. Prevost was also ordained to the priesthood in this church on 19 June 1982. It also features mosaics by Marko Rupnik.
