= Pope Leo XIV =

Head of the Catholic Church since 2025

- Bishop of Rome
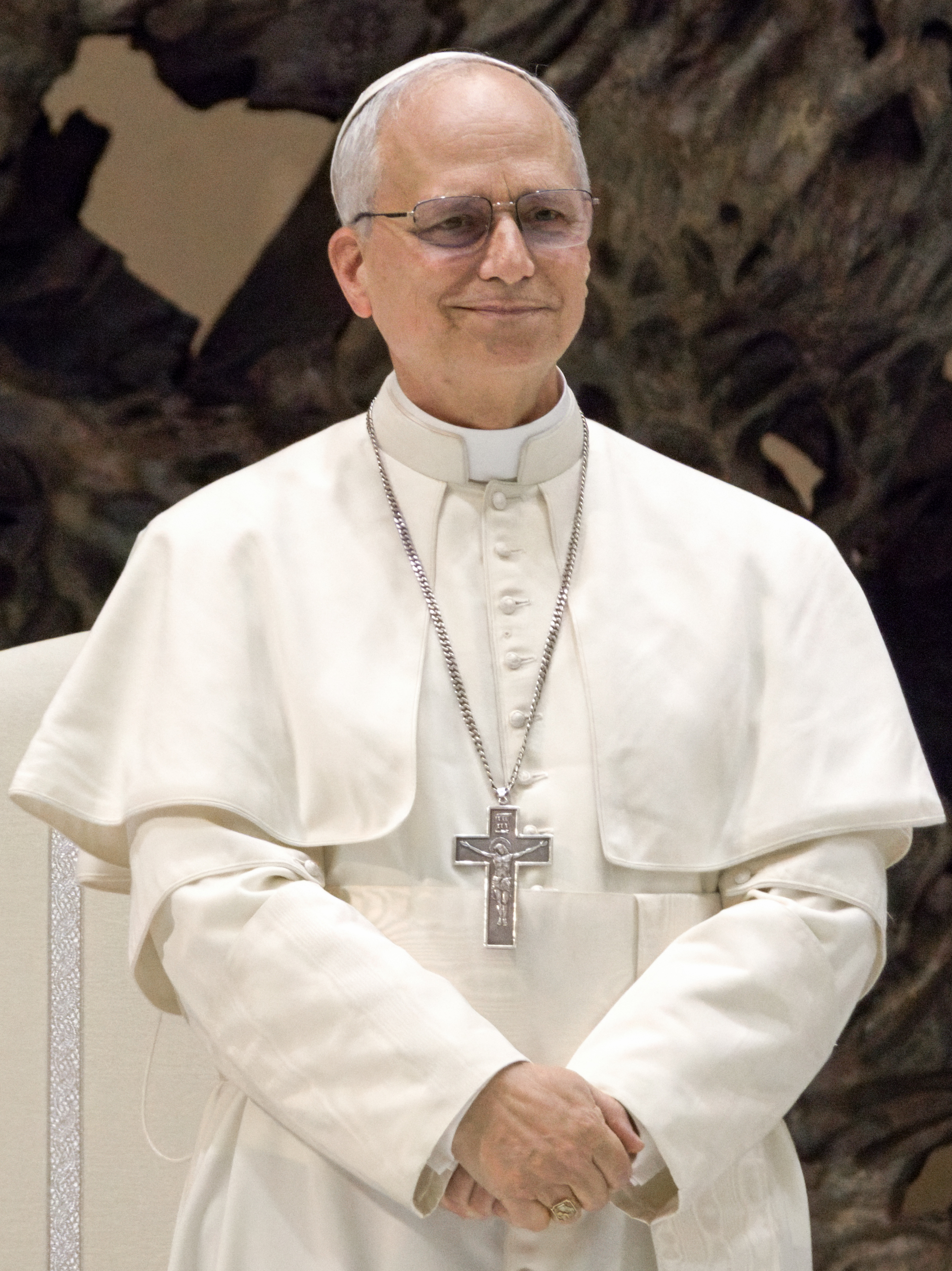
- Leo XIV in 2025
- Church: Catholic Church
- Papacy began: May 8, 2025
- Predecessor: Francis
Previous posts
Previous posts	Prior Provincial of Our Mother of Good Counsel (1998‍–‍2001); Prior General of the Order of Saint Augustine (2001‍–‍2013); Titular Bishop of Sufar (2014‍–‍2015); Apostolic Administrator of Chiclayo (2014‍–‍2015); Bishop of Chiclayo (2015‍–‍2023); Apostolic Administrator of Callao (2020‍–‍2021); Prefect of the Dicastery for Bishops (2023‍–‍2025); President of the Pontifical Commission for Latin America (2023‍–‍2025); Cardinal Deacon of Santa Monica degli Agostiniani (2023‍–‍2025); Cardinal Bishop of Albano (2025)

Orders
- Ordination: June 19, 1982 by Jean Jadot
- Consecration: December 12, 2014 by James Green
- Created cardinal: September 30, 2023 by Francis
- Rank: Cardinal deacon (2023‍–‍2025); Cardinal bishop (2025)

Personal details
- Born: Robert Francis Prevost; September 14, 1955 (age 71) Chicago, Illinois, United States
- Citizenship: United States; Peru (since 2015); Vatican City (since 2023)
- Residence: Apostolic Palace; (official residence); Palace of Castel Gandolfo; (official summer residence)
- Education: Villanova University (BS); Catholic Theological Union (MDiv); Pontifical University of Saint Thomas Aquinas (JCL, JCD)
- Motto: In illo Uno unum (Latin for 'In the One, [we are] one')
- Signature: Leo XIV's signature

- Coat of arms: Leo XIV's coat of arms

Ordination history
History
Diaconal ordination
- Ordained by: Bishop Thomas Gumbleton
- Date: September 10, 1981
- Place: St. Clare of Montefalco Parish, Grosse Pointe Park, Michigan
Priestly ordination
- Ordained by: Jean Jadot
- Date: June 19, 1982
- Place: Santa Monica degli Agostiniani, Rome
Episcopal consecration
- Principal consecrator: James Green
- Co-consecrators: Jesús Moliné Labarte; Salvador Piñeiro García-Calderón
- Date: December 12, 2014
- Place: St. Mary's Cathedral, Chiclayo
Cardinalate
- Elevated by: Pope Francis
- Date: September 30, 2023
Episcopal succession
Bishops consecrated by Pope Leo XIV as principal consecrator
- Mirosław Stanisław Wachowski: 2025
- Andrea Carlevale: 2026
- Stefano Sparapani: 2026
- Marco Valenti: 2026
- Alessandro Zenobbi: 2026

Pope Leo XIV (Note: Latin: Leo PP. XIV; Italian: Papa Leone XIV; Spanish: Papa León XIV) (born Robert Francis Prevost, (Note: see Prevost (surname)) pronounced /ˈpriːvoʊst/ PREE-vohst; (Note: While working in Peru and Latin America as bishop (2015–2023), Prevost customarily used the name "Robert Francis Prevost Martínez" in accordance with Spanish naming customs, as Martínez is his mother's family name.) September 14, 1955) is the head of the Catholic Church and sovereign of Vatican City.

Born in Chicago, United States, Prevost became a friar in the Order of Saint Augustine in 1977 and was ordained as a priest in 1982. He earned a Doctor of Canon Law degree in 1987 from the Pontifical University of St. Thomas Aquinas in Rome. He performed extensive missionary work in Peru in the 1980s and 1990s, working as a parish pastor, diocesan official, seminary teacher, and administrator. Elected prior general of the Order of Saint Augustine, he traveled extensively while he was based in Rome from 2001 to 2013. He then returned to Peru as Bishop of Chiclayo from 2015 to 2023, and became a Peruvian citizen. In 2023, Pope Francis appointed him prefect of the Dicastery for Bishops in Rome, and president of the Pontifical Commission for Latin America. Upon his return to Rome, Prevost was made a cardinal.

As a cardinal, Prevost emphasized synodality, missionary dialogue, and engagement with social and technological challenges; he has also addressed climate change, international migration, church governance, and human rights. Prevost's election in the 2025 conclave was unexpected by observers, as he was considered a dark horse candidate. He is the first pope from the United States or North America, the first pope to be a citizen of Peru, and the second pope, following the 12th-century Pope Adrian IV, to come from an English-speaking country. He is also the first pope from the Order of Saint Augustine. Following the precedent of Pope Leo XIII, who developed modern Catholic social teaching amid the tumult of the Second Industrial Revolution, Prevost chose the papal name Leo XIV—both to echo Leo XIII's concern for workers and fairness, and as a response to the challenges of a new industrial revolution and artificial intelligence.

As pope, Leo has consistently opposed armed conflict and nationalism while advocating for the rights of immigrants. He has introduced new warnings about the use of artificial intelligence technology. Leo has affirmed the teachings of his predecessors, including social teachings and the climate policy of Pope Francis. He has consistently pointed to the teachings of the Second Vatican Council as the "guiding star" of the church. In 2026, he confronted the second Écône consecrations, which resulted in renewed excommunications and schism with the Society of St. Pius X.

== Early life, family, and education (1955–1973) ==
=== Background and ancestry ===
Robert Francis Prevost was born on September 14, 1955, at Mercy Hospital in the Bronzeville neighborhood of Chicago, Illinois, on the city's South Side. He is of French, Italian, Spanish, and Louisiana Creole descent.

His father, Louis Marius Prevost, was born in Chicago and grew up in Hyde Park. Louis's father and mother were immigrants from Italy and France, respectively. A United States Navy veteran of World War II, Louis earned a Master of Education from DePaul University and later became superintendent of Brookwood School District 167 in Glenwood, Illinois. Prevost's mother, Mildred Agnes Prevost (née Martínez), was also born in Chicago, into a mixed-race Black Creole family from Louisiana. She graduated from DePaul with a bachelor's in library science and a Master of Education, becoming an educator and a librarian, including at Mendel Catholic High School.

=== Early life and schooling ===
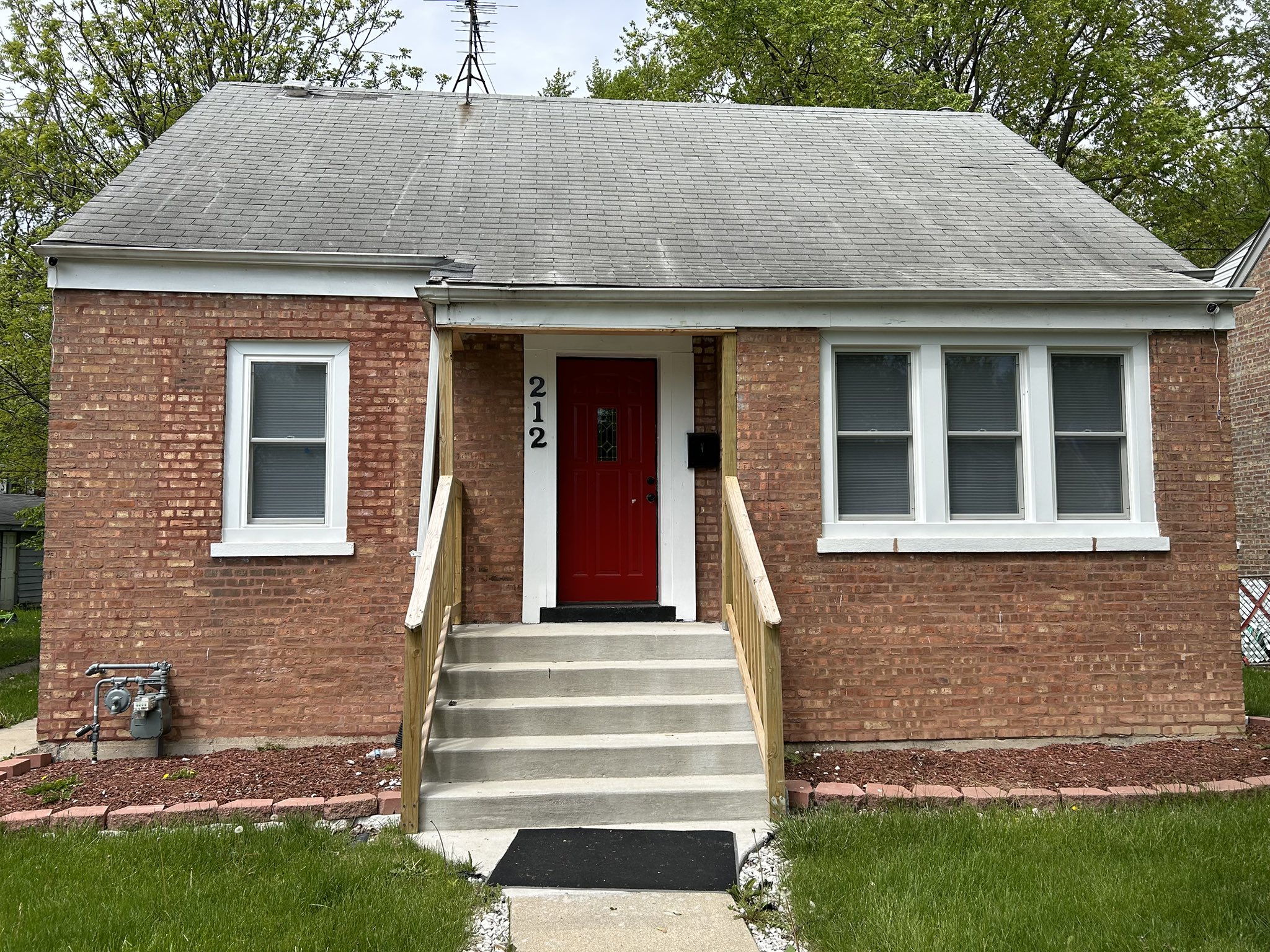
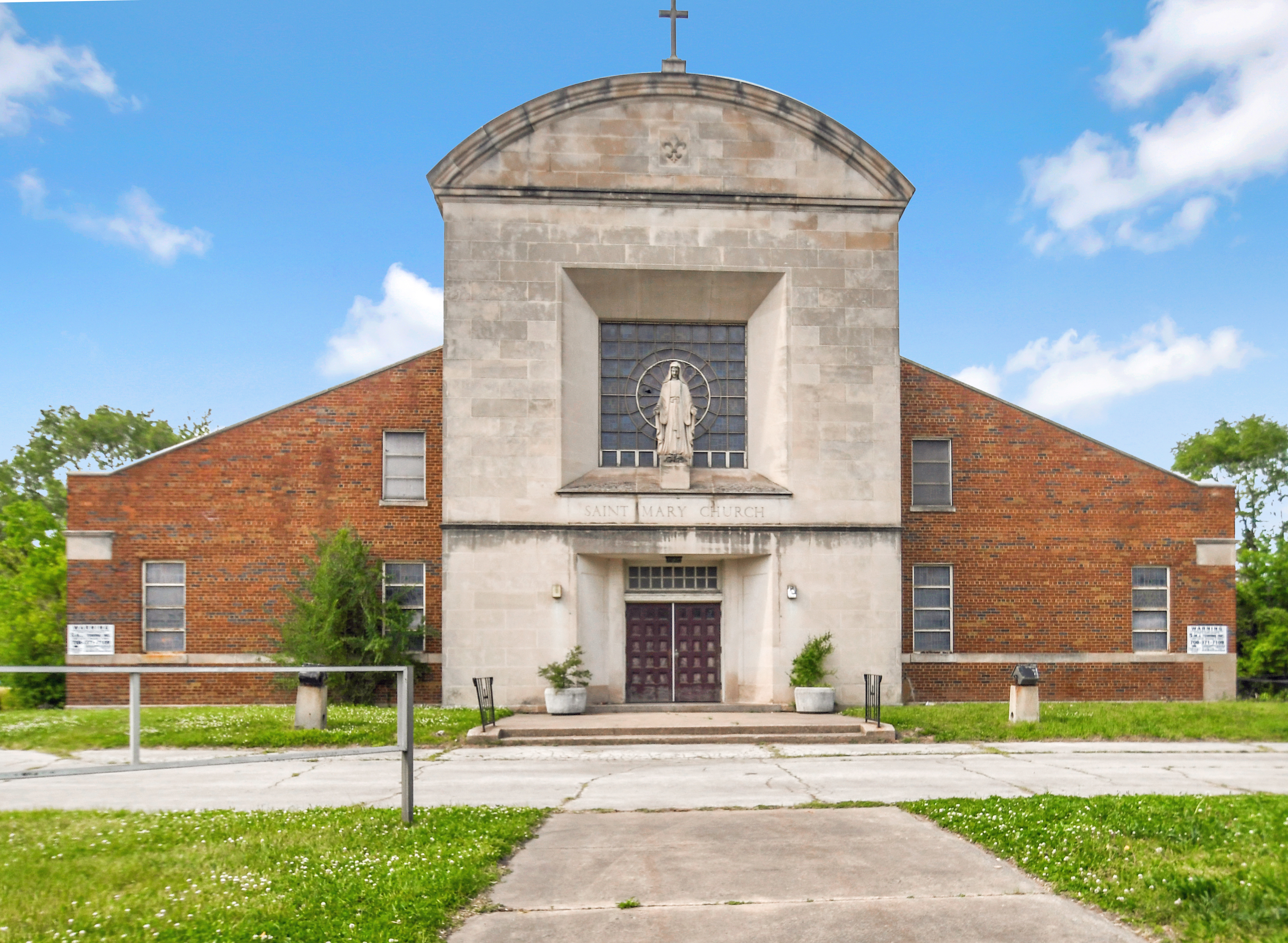
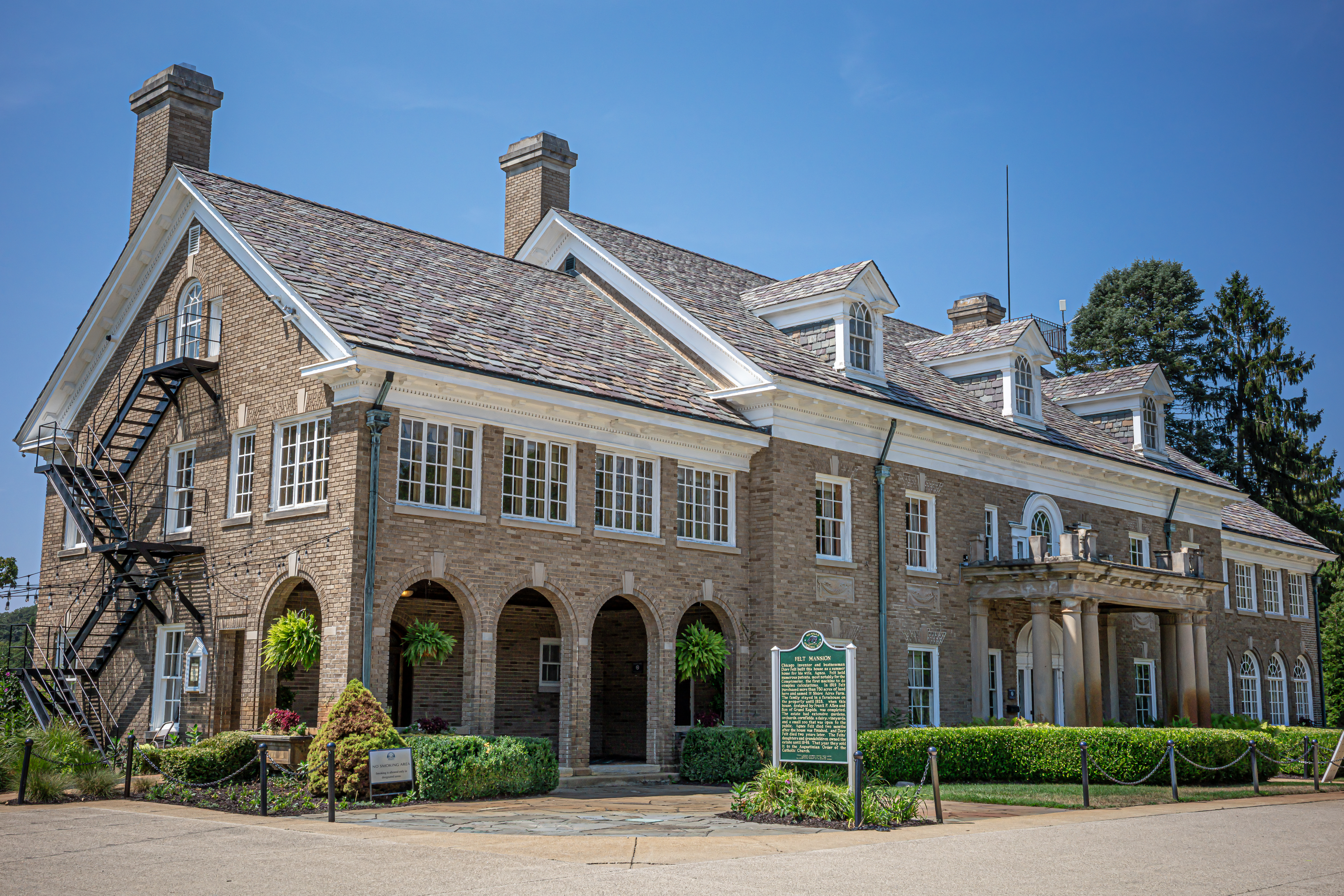
Prevost's childhood home in Dolton (top); he attended Saint Mary of the Assumption Church (center) and its parish elementary school in Chicago. He then attended St. Augustine Seminary High School at the Felt Mansion (bottom) in Saugatuck

Known as "Rob" to his family and "Bob" to friends as an adult, Prevost was raised in Dolton, Illinois, a suburb bordering the far South Side; his childhood home was purchased by the Village of Dolton after he became pope. He grew up in the parish of St. Mary of the Assumption in nearby Riverdale, Chicago, where he was baptized and received his First communion. Prevost has two older brothers, Louis Martín and John Joseph. His parents were practicing Catholics who were very involved in the parish: Louis was a catechist—a teacher of the faith—and Mildred was an active member of the Rosary and Altar Society, sang in the church choir, provided services for the church, and went to daily Mass. According to Leo, he was greatly influenced by his parents' faith.

His mother would call him and his brothers to go to Mass before school at 6:30 a.m. and told them Jesus "is your best friend," and Mass was "a way to find that friend." Prevost went to the parish Catholic school and served as a choirboy and altar boy. (Note: St. Mary's Church in Dolton was closed in 2011.) Prevost aspired to the priesthood from a young age and would play-act the Mass at home with his brothers. He decided to enter the Augustinians in the eighth grade after visits by priests of multiple different religious orders to the family home, later saying the Salesians of Don Bosco "came in second place".

From September 1969 to 1973, Prevost attended St. Augustine Seminary High School, a minor seminary near Saugatuck, Michigan; his brother John recalled how, from the end of eighth grade on, and especially after joining the Order of Saint Augustine, until their later adulthood when leave allowed them to reconnect, Prevost was hardly at home or with their family.

At the Augustinian seminary, he earned a letter of commendation for academic excellence, consistently appeared on the honor roll, served as yearbook editor in chief, and was secretary of the student council and a member of the National Honor Society. He captained the bowling team and headed the speech and debate team, competing in Congressional Debate. Well-liked and highly intelligent, Prevost had a reputation for helping other students as a tutor. Of 43 students who entered in his class, Prevost was one of only 13 students in his class to graduate in May of 1973. Some departed due to difficult academics, others due to no longer feeling called to the priesthood.

Augustinian bishop John McNabb frequently visited the seminary during Prevost's time there. He spoke about the Augustinian missions in Peru which he oversaw, which was one of the young seminarian's first introductions to the country.

== University, seminary, and early priesthood (1973–1998) ==
=== University ===
In 1973, Prevost was planning to attend Tolentine College, an Augustinian seminary in Olympia Fields, Illinois, but it closed that same year. Instead, he enrolled in Villanova University, an Augustinian college located near Philadelphia. There, he earned a Bachelor of Science (BS) in mathematics in 1977 in addition to the required seminary philosophy coursework. He also continued formation with the Augustinian order, entering the recently-added pre-novitiate program as a freshman. At Villanova, he took elective courses in Hebrew and Latin, read the writings of Augustine of Hippo, and discussed the work of theologian Karl Rahner with other students. He was a founding member of Villanovans for Life, the oldest collegiate pro-life club in the United States. While studying at Villanova, Prevost also worked as a cemetery groundskeeper at Saint Denis Catholic Church in Havertown, Pennsylvania.

=== Entry into Augustinians and seminary studies ===
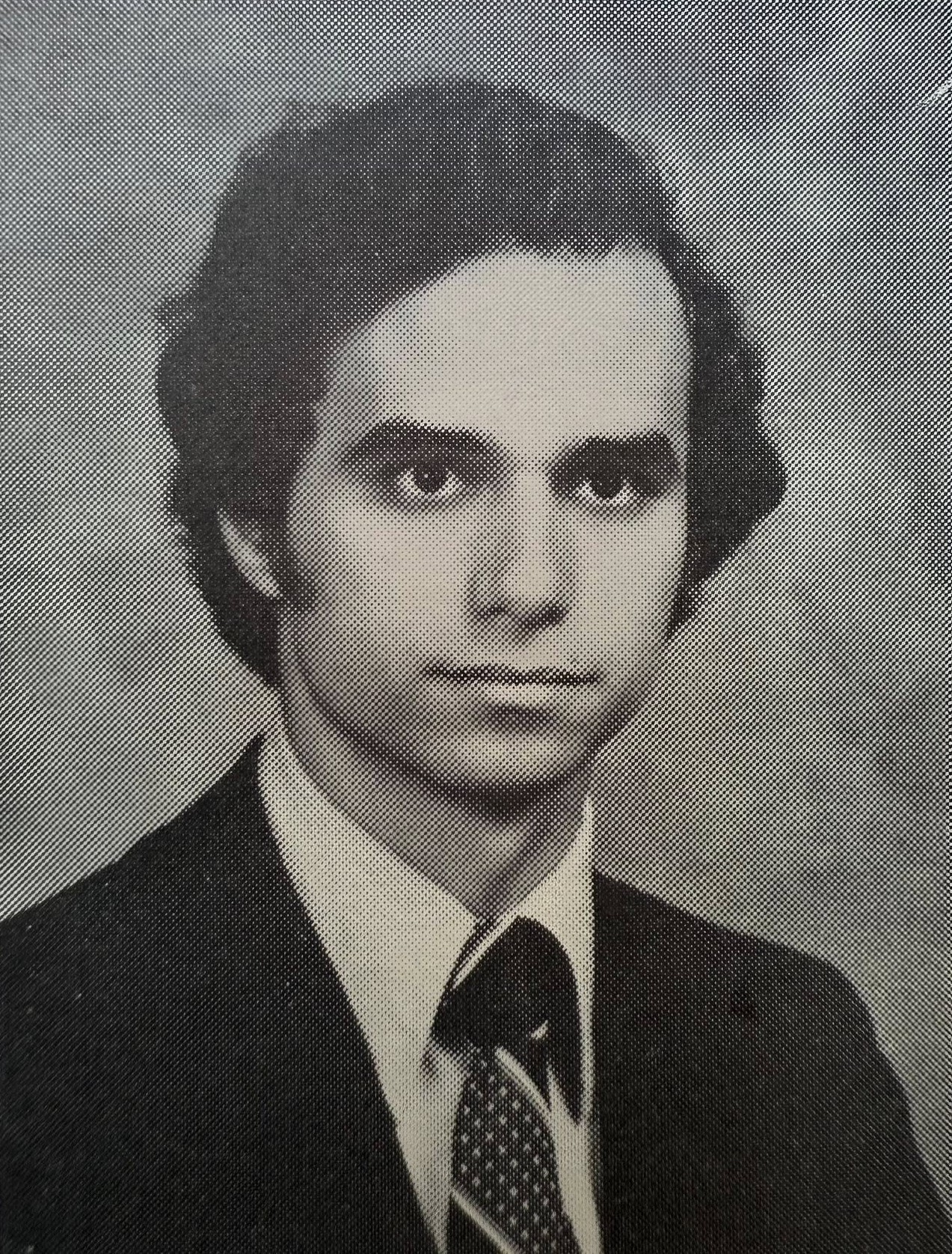
Prevost in 1977, the same year he entered the Augustinian order

On September 1, 1977, Prevost entered the Order of Saint Augustine's novitiate in the Province of Our Mother of Good Counsel, residing for one year at Immaculate Conception Church in St. Louis, Missouri. In the summer of 1978, Prevost spent three months in Clinical Pastoral Education at Abbott Northwestern Hospital in Minneapolis. He took his first vows at Immaculate Coneption Church on September 2, 1978, and his solemn vows on August 29, 1981.

He returned to Hyde Park, where his father had grown up, to obtain a Master of Divinity (MDiv) from Catholic Theological Union in 1982 and taught physics and math at St. Rita of Cascia High School in Chicago during his studies. As his spiritual director, a guide to the Christian life, he chose a religious sister, Sister Lyn Osiek, RSCJ, the supervisor of his theological reflection class.

=== Ordination and missionary work in Peru ===
On September 10, 1981, Prevost was ordained a deacon by Bishop Thomas Gumbleton at St. Clare of Montefalco Parish in Grosse Pointe Park, Michigan. That same year, Prevost concluded his studies at Catholic Theological Union. Prevost was ordained a priest in Rome, at the Chapel of Saint Monica of the Augustinians by Archbishop Jean Jadot on June 19, 1982.

Prevost earned a Licentiate of Canon Law (JCL) in 1984, followed by a Doctor of Canon Law (JCD) in 1987, both from the Pontifical University of Saint Thomas Aquinas in Rome. During this period, he also learned Italian and took part in the October 1983 protests against the placement of BGM-109G Gryphon missiles at Comiso Airport which occurred across Europe at this time. His doctoral thesis was a legal study of the role of Augustinian local priors.

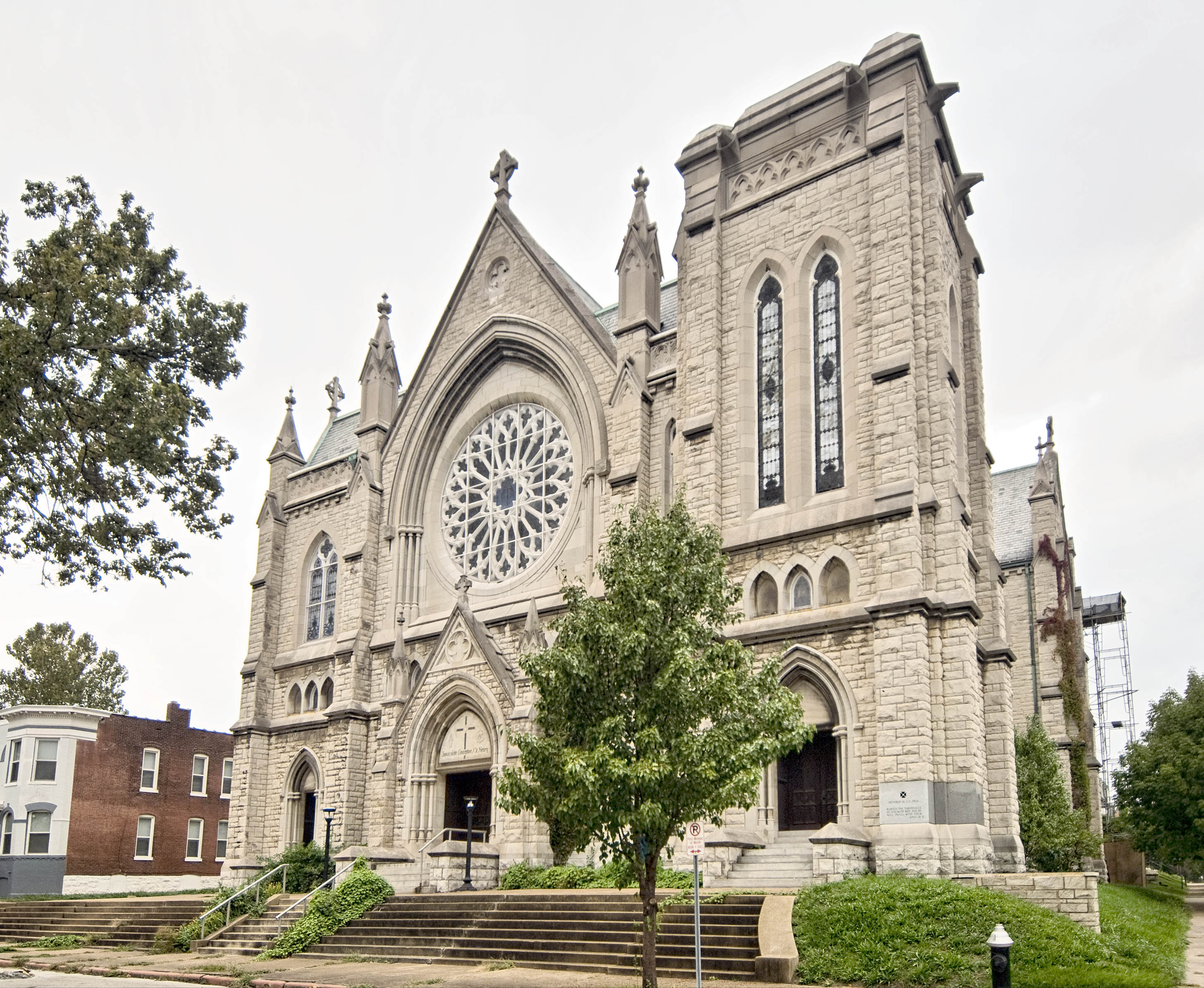
Prevost spent his novitiate at Immaculate Conception Church in St. Louis, Missouri.

Prevost joined the Augustinian mission in Peru in 1985, serving as chancellor of the Territorial Prelature of Chulucanas, as well as an aide to bishop John McNabb. Much of his work in his first year in Peru focused on disaster relief following severe El Niño rainstorms. In 1987, after defending his doctoral thesis, he was vocation director and missions director of the Augustinian Province of Our Mother of Good Counsel in Olympia Fields, Illinois, and worked with the faculty of the Augustinian Novitiate in Oconomowoc, Wisconsin, before returning to Peru in 1988. During his time in Peru, Prevost met and appreciated the priest-theologian Gustavo Gutierrez of the Order of Preachers, a pioneer of liberation theology. He also learned and mastered the Spanish language during this period.

Prevost spent a decade heading the Augustinian seminary in Trujillo, Peru, teaching canon law as well as Moral theology and Patristics in the diocesan seminary San Carlos y Marcello, serving as prefect of studies, acting as a judge in the regional ecclesiastical court, and working in the parish ministry on the city's outskirts. From 1992 to 1999, he was also parochial administrator of Our Lady of Montserrat, Trujillo. He proved successful in the Augustinians' efforts to recruit Peruvians for the priesthood and leadership positions in the order. He organized support for Venezuelan refugees to Peru despite discrimination against the Venezuelans.

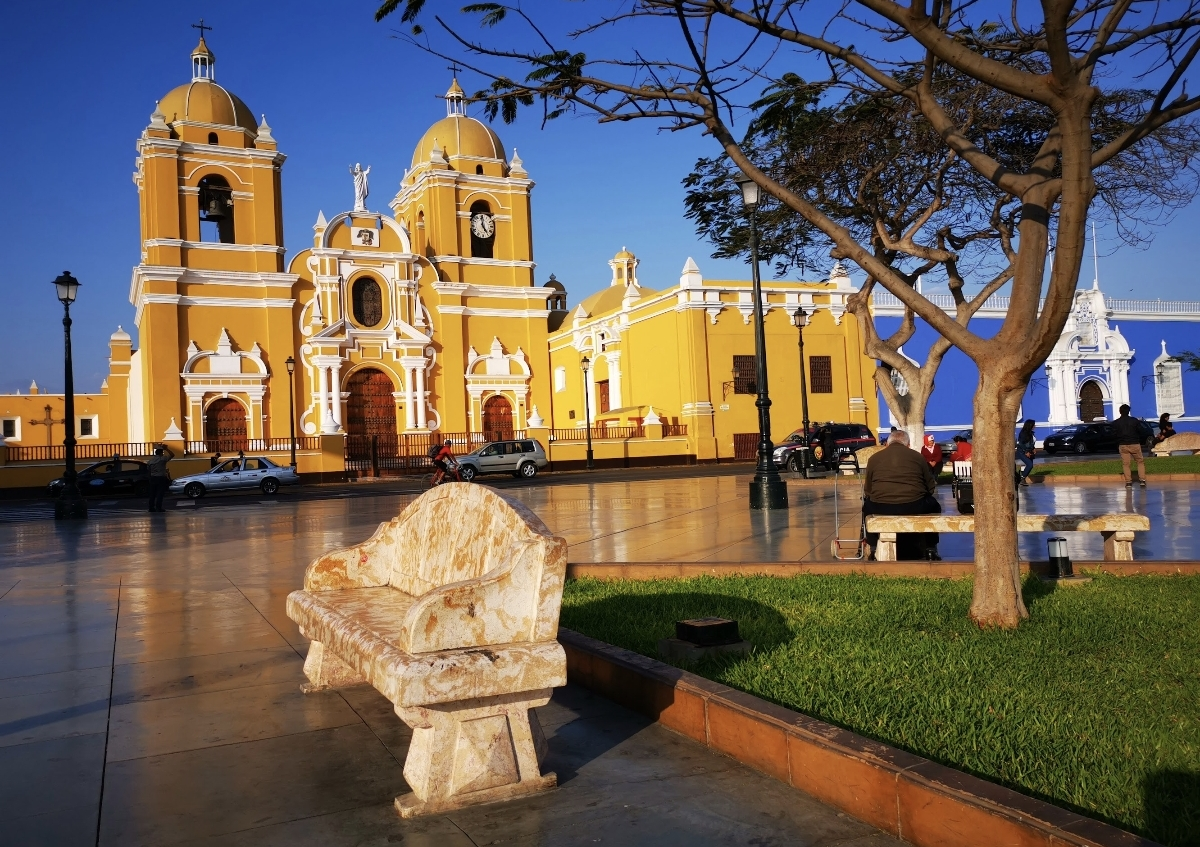
Cathedral Basilica of Saint Mary, Trujillo. As a young missionary, Prevost served in various roles in the Archdiocese of Trujillo.

During the Fujimorato era, Prevost criticized the actions of then president Alberto Fujimori, placing special emphasis on the victims of the Peruvian Army, especially the Colina Group, during the period of terrorism in Peru, as well as on political corruption. In 2017, he criticized President Pedro Pablo Kuczynski's decision to pardon Fujimori and called upon Fujimori "to personally apologize for some of the great injustices that were committed". He was described as a defender of the human rights of the population of the Norte Chico region against the violence of the Marxist–Leninist–Maoist guerrilla organization Shining Path.

== Prior provincial and prior general (1998–2013) ==
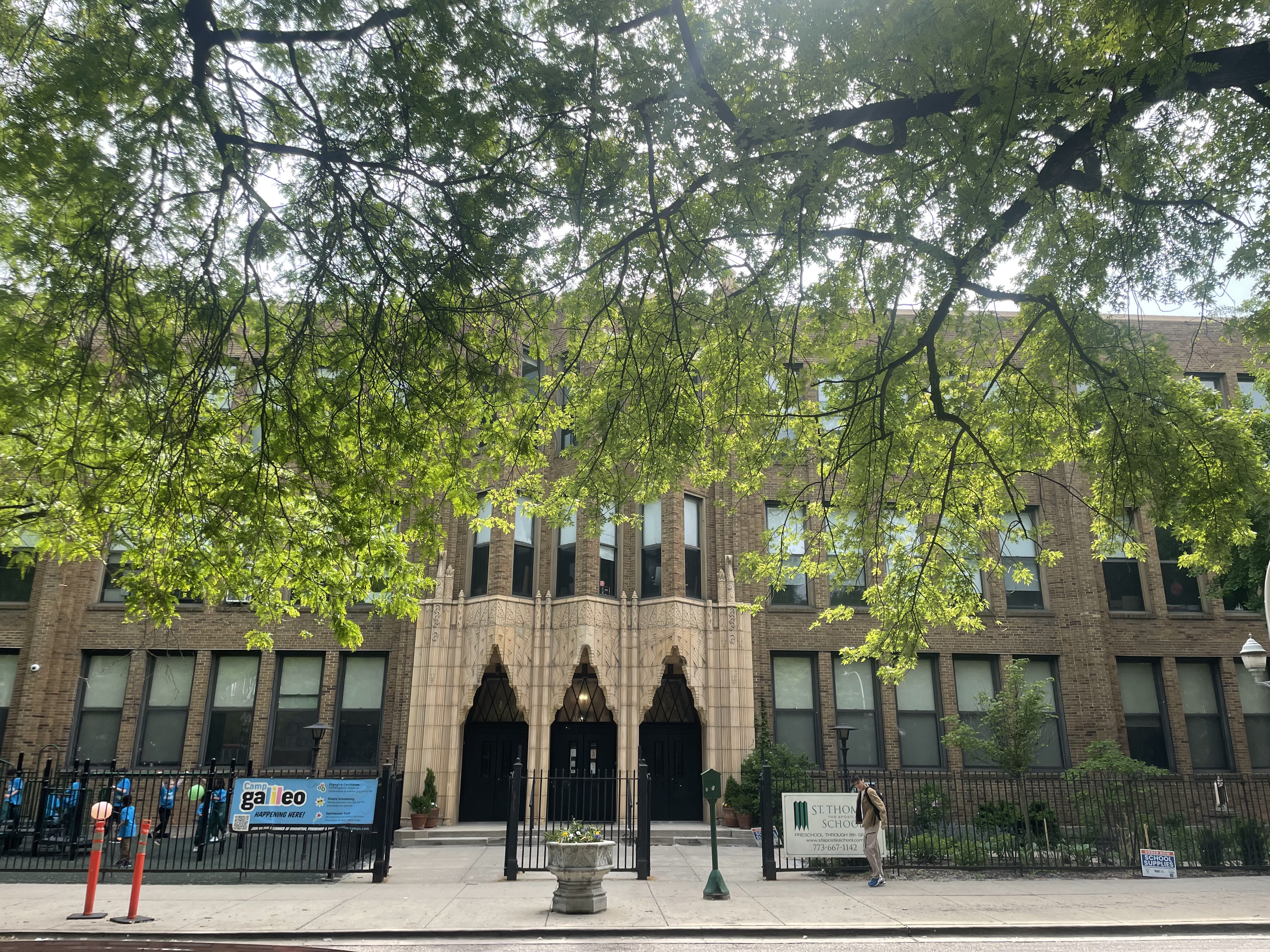
St. Thomas School in Hyde Park, Chicago

In 1998, Prevost was elected Prior Provincial of the Order of St. Augustine's Province of Our Mother of Good Counsel based in Chicago, assuming the role on March 8, 1999. In 2000, he permitted James Ray, a priest of the Archdiocese of Chicago, to reside at St. John Stone Friary in Chicago under supervision. Ray had been suspended from public ministry since 1991 due to credible accusations that he had sexually abused minors. Prevost's allowing of the placement of Ray in a friary at the request of the Archdiocese of Chicago and close to St. Thomas School was the subject of reporting in 2021, prior to his appointment to the Vatican. According to the Augustinians, "the location was selected because of the supervision the priest would receive." After American bishops implemented stricter rules in the Dallas Charter, Ray was moved to other housing in 2002. (Note: That Ray was allowed to live at the friary was first reported by the Chicago Sun-Times in 2021, based on documents the church made public in 2014.)

Elected prior general of the Order of Saint Augustine in 2001, Prevost served two consecutive, six-year terms until 2013. During his tenure as global head of the Augustinian order, Prevost lived and worked in Rome but frequently traveled around the world. It was in that capacity that in 2004, he visited Buenos Aires and met Cardinal Jorge Bergoglio, the future Pope Francis, for the first time. Their early encounters are reported to have not gone well. Prevost later explained that at the time, he thought he would never become a bishop after Bergoglio was elected Pope in 2013. While he has declined to reveal what they initially disagreed upon, it has been reported that at least one disagreement was due to the assignment of a particular Augustinian friar, with Prevost prevailing. However, they were able to reconcile their differences before Prevost left Rome for Chicago in 2013.

From 2013 to 2014, Prevost served as director of formation at the Convent of St. Augustine in Chicago and as first councilor and provincial vicar of the province of Our Mother of Good Counsel.

== Bishop of Chiclayo (2015–2023) ==
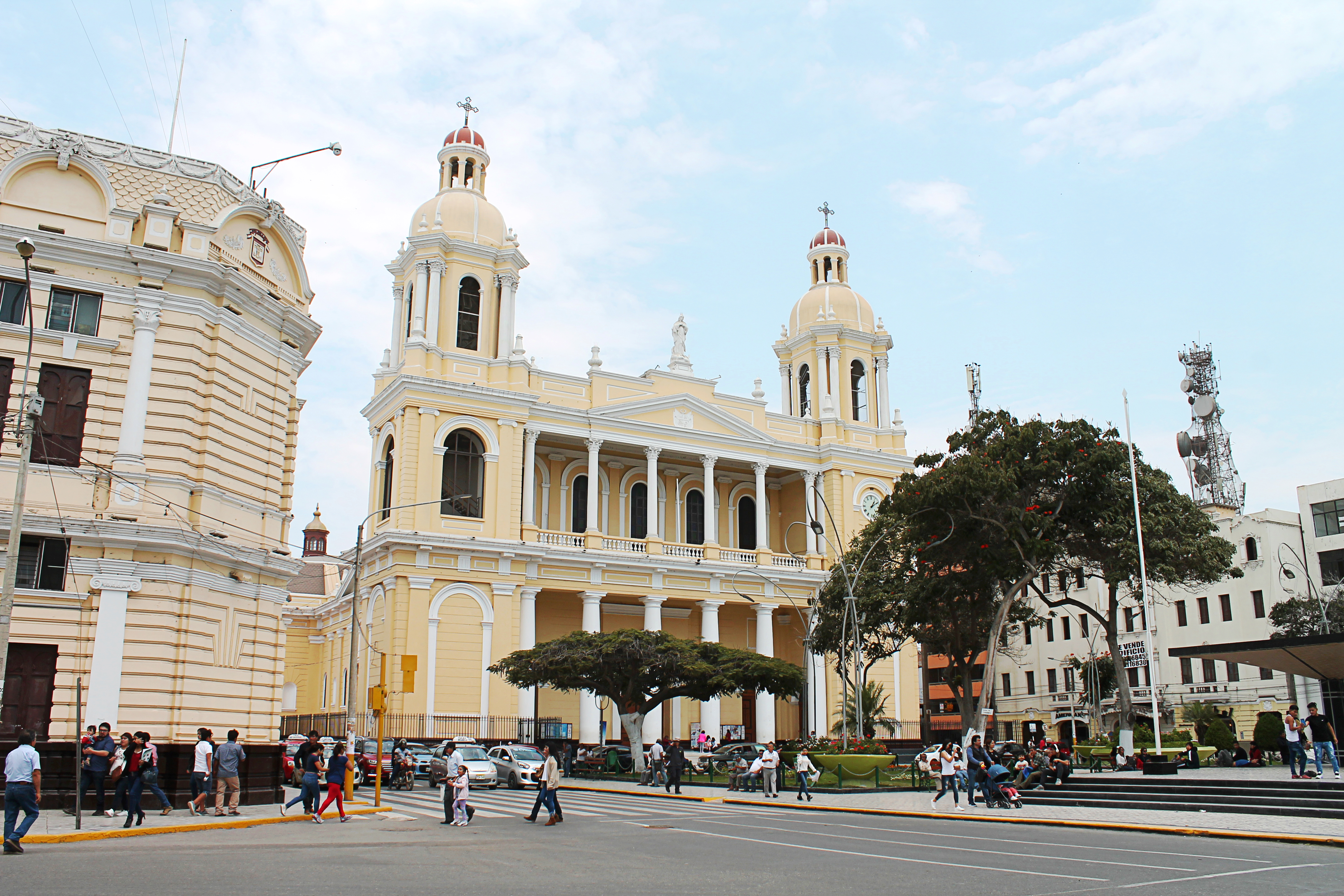
St. Mary's Cathedral in Chiclayo, Peru, where Prevost was diocesan bishop from 2015 to 2023

In 2014, Archbishop James Green, Apostolic Nuncio to Peru, proposed to Pope Francis that Prevost might be an option for bishop of the Diocese of Chiclayo in northern Peru. On November 3, 2014, Pope Francis appointed Prevost as the apostolic administrator of Chiclayo and titular bishop of Sufar. Prevost was ordained on December 12, 2014, at St. Mary Cathedral by Archbishop Green. As required by a 1980 agreement between the Holy See and Peru, Prevost became a naturalized Peruvian citizen before being appointed diocesan bishop. After his naturalization, on September 26, 2015, he was named Bishop of Chiclayo.

At the time of his appointment, Chiclayo was described as a conservative diocese, having been staffed by Opus Dei priests for many decades. He entrusted several of them with senior leadership positions, worked closely with them, and lived with them in the same residence, calling them hardworking and obedient.

Prevost developed a close bond with the diocese of Chiclayo, directing a special message to them in his first message as pope, calling them "my beloved diocese", "faithful people", and "faithful church". He was seen as being "very faithful to the Church's social doctrine" and organized relief efforts during calamities. He helped victims of trafficking and sex workers learn new skills and trades and invited them to spiritual retreats while ensuring that volunteer workers had adequate training. He established a diocesan Commission on Integral Ecology and appointed a woman to lead it.

Prevost as Bishop of Chiclayo in 2018, commenting on extreme poverty in the region (in Spanish)

On July 13, 2019, Prevost was appointed a member of the Congregation for the Clergy, and on April 15, 2020, he became apostolic administrator of Callao. (Note: His role in Callao ended upon the installation of a new bishop there on May 26, 2021.) On November 21, 2020, he was appointed additionally a member of the Congregation for Bishops. Within the Episcopal Conference of Peru, he served on the permanent council (2018–2020) and was elected president of its Commission for Education and Culture in 2019. His presence in the permanent council of the episcopal conference was seen by Cardinal Joseph Tobin as "extraordinary for someone who was not born in Peru." Prevost had a private audience with Pope Francis on March 1, 2021, sparking speculation about a new role in Chicago or Rome.

Prevost has been accused of covering up sexual abuse during his time in Chiclayo. In 2022, alleged victims of abuse in 2007 by priests Ricardo Yesquén Paiva and Eleuterio Vásquez Gonzáles said the Diocese of Chiclayo failed to investigate their cases. The Diocese of Chiclayo stated that Prevost followed proper procedures, met with Ana María Quispe and her sisters in April 2022 to personally attend the victims, encouraged them to initiate a civil action, and himself initiated a canonical investigation, the results of which he sent to the Dicastery for the Doctrine of the Faith. The sisters stated in 2024 that no full penal canonical investigation had occurred, and an investigation by América Televisión concluded that the church's investigation had not been thorough. In response, the diocese of Chiclayo stated that the allegations of the TV program were false, calling on it to correct its inaccuracies. The diocese said the accused priest "never admitted" the accusations against him, that Prevost had prohibited him from exercising the priestly ministry, and that the priest had transferred his residence to his family's home. Prevost submitted the dossier to the Vatican, which gave a pro nunc, or temporary, decision of dismissal. The diocese later reopened the case and sent it to the Vatican anew, and thus it reportedly remains "open up to now."

Speaking to Peruvian newspaper La República while Bishop of Chiclayo, Prevost said: "If you are a victim of sexual abuse by a priest, report it. We reject cover-ups and secrecy; that causes a lot of harm. We have to help people who have suffered due to wrongdoing." (Note: This interview was conducted while Prevost was bishop but was published after he was elected pope.) Journalist Pedro Salinas, who investigated and exposed crimes committed by members of the now-defunct Sodalitium Christianae Vitae—including sexual, physical, and psychological abuse—has argued that Prevost always expressed his support for the victims and was one of the most reliable church authorities in Peru, leading Pope Francis to select him as prefect of the Holy See's Dicastery for Bishops. Salinas has written that some of the Peruvian clerics linked to the Sodalitium sought to attack and defame Prevost in retaliation for his role in the Sodalitium's dissolution by Pope Francis due to its sexual abuse scandals, as well as Prevost's nearness to Francis's political theology.

== Dicastery for Bishops and cardinalate (2023–2025) ==
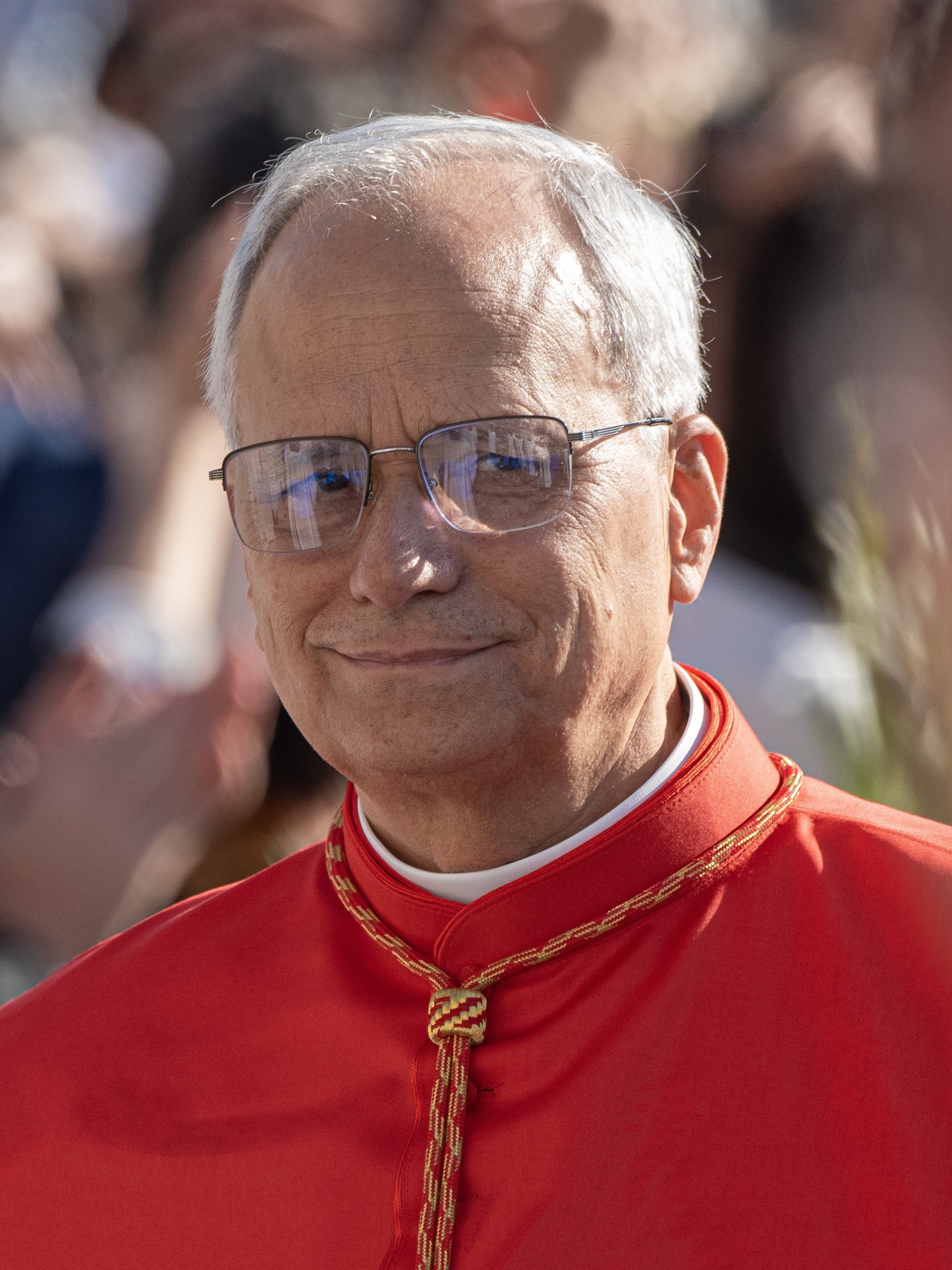
Prevost during the consistory where he was created a cardinal, September 30, 2023.

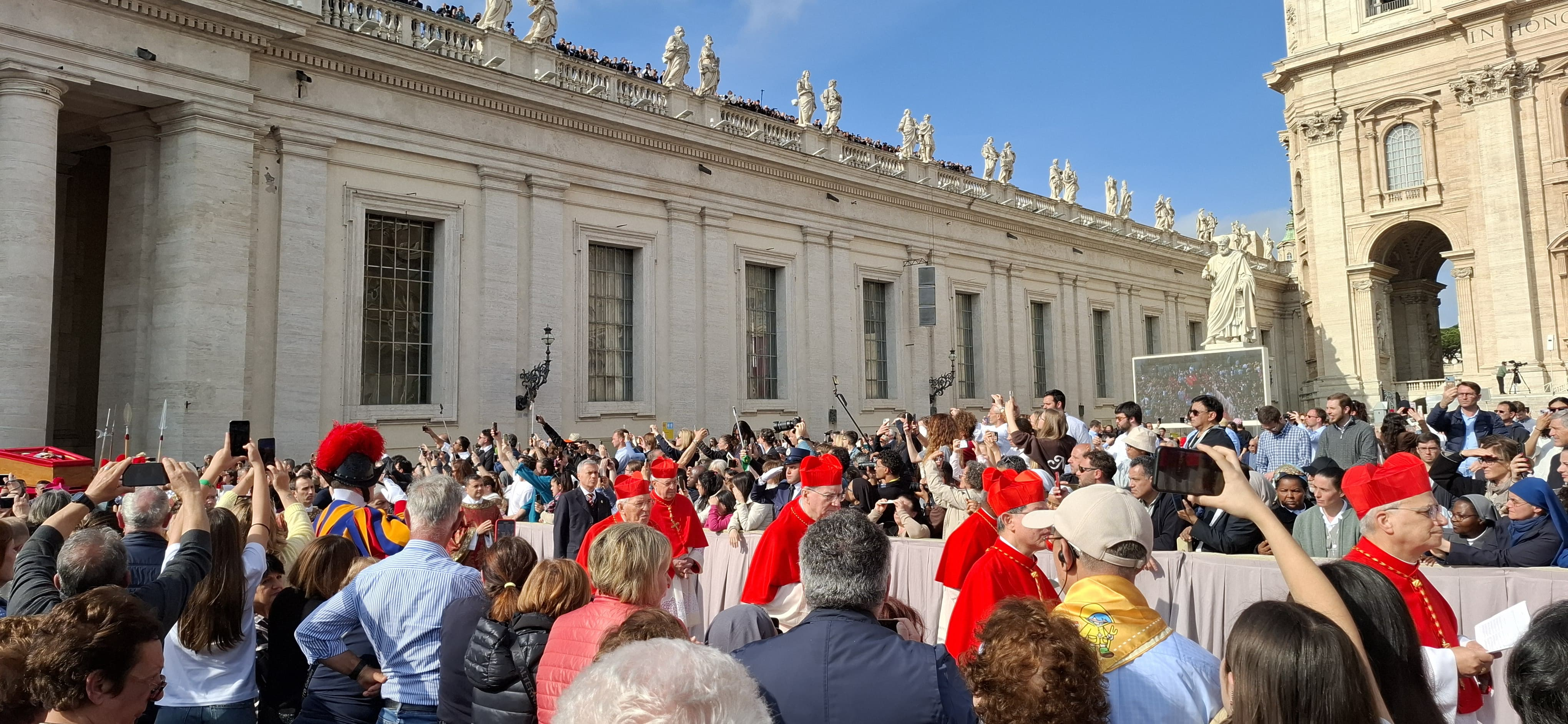
Cardinal Prevost (first from right) during the procession with the body of Pope Francis, April 23, 2025.

By the 2020s, Pope Francis had become close to Prevost and advanced his career. On January 30, 2023, Francis appointed Prevost prefect of the Dicastery for Bishops, with the title Archbishop-Bishop emeritus of Chiclayo. Prevost expressed preference to stay in Peru but accepted the appointment. He continued to be active in the Latin American and Caribbean Episcopal Council and participated in the council's meetings in Aguadilla, Puerto Rico, in May 2023.

On September 30, 2023, Francis created Prevost a cardinal with the rank of cardinal deacon and assigned him the deaconry of Santa Monica degli Agostiniani. As prefect, his task involved playing a critical role in evaluating and recommending episcopal candidates worldwide, thereby increasing his visibility within the church. These roles elevated his prominence as a papal candidate leading into the conclave. In October 2023, Francis appointed him as a member of seven additional dicasteries, (Note: Francis appointed him to the Dicastery for Evangelization (Section for First Evangelization and New Particular Churches), Dicastery for the Doctrine of the Faith, Dicastery for the Eastern Churches, Dicastery for the Clergy, Dicastery for Institutes of Consecrated Life and Societies of Apostolic Life, Dicastery for Culture and Education, and Dicastery for Legislative Texts.) and also named him to the Pontifical Commission for the Vatican City State.

On February 6, 2025, Francis named Prevost Cardinal Bishop of Albano. (Note: Prevost's plans to take possession of Albano on May 12 were cancelled when the conclave to elect Francis' successor was scheduled.) On February 11, he was appointed to the dignity and rank of Bailiff Grand Cross of Honour and Devotion of the Order of Malta by Grand Master Fra' John Dunlap.

== Written works before the papacy and theology of leadership ==
Given his focus on mission, the writings of Prevost before his election were few. When he was global head of the Augustinians, the Rule and Constitutions of the Order of Saint Augustine was "issued by Authority of the Prior General, Robert F. Prevost" in 2002.

Aside from four journal articles published mostly in Augustinian journals, his main work of scholarship is his doctoral dissertation, The Office and Authority of the Local Prior in the Order of Saint Augustine, published by the Pontifical University of Saint Thomas Aquinas in 1987. The work has been noted for its legal precision, Augustinian roots, postconciliar engagement and historical depth. In his dissertation, Prevost argues that authority is received from above, and therefore "the substance of the office of the superior is to obey; to obey the will of God and to put great effort into trying to know it, to formulate it and to specify it for his subjects." Leadership is based on Jesus Christ's threefold offices of teaching, sanctifying and governing, who sanctifies by prayer and builds community by being centered on the Mass, having "the care of the Brothers, 'especially in spiritual matters.'" Based on Augustine's concept, Prevost's thesis depicts authority as a service. He writes that service means "listening to what the Spirit is saying in His people...the Prior then is called to listen, so that together they can discern and implement what the Spirit inspires."

== Papacy (2025–present) ==
=== Election ===
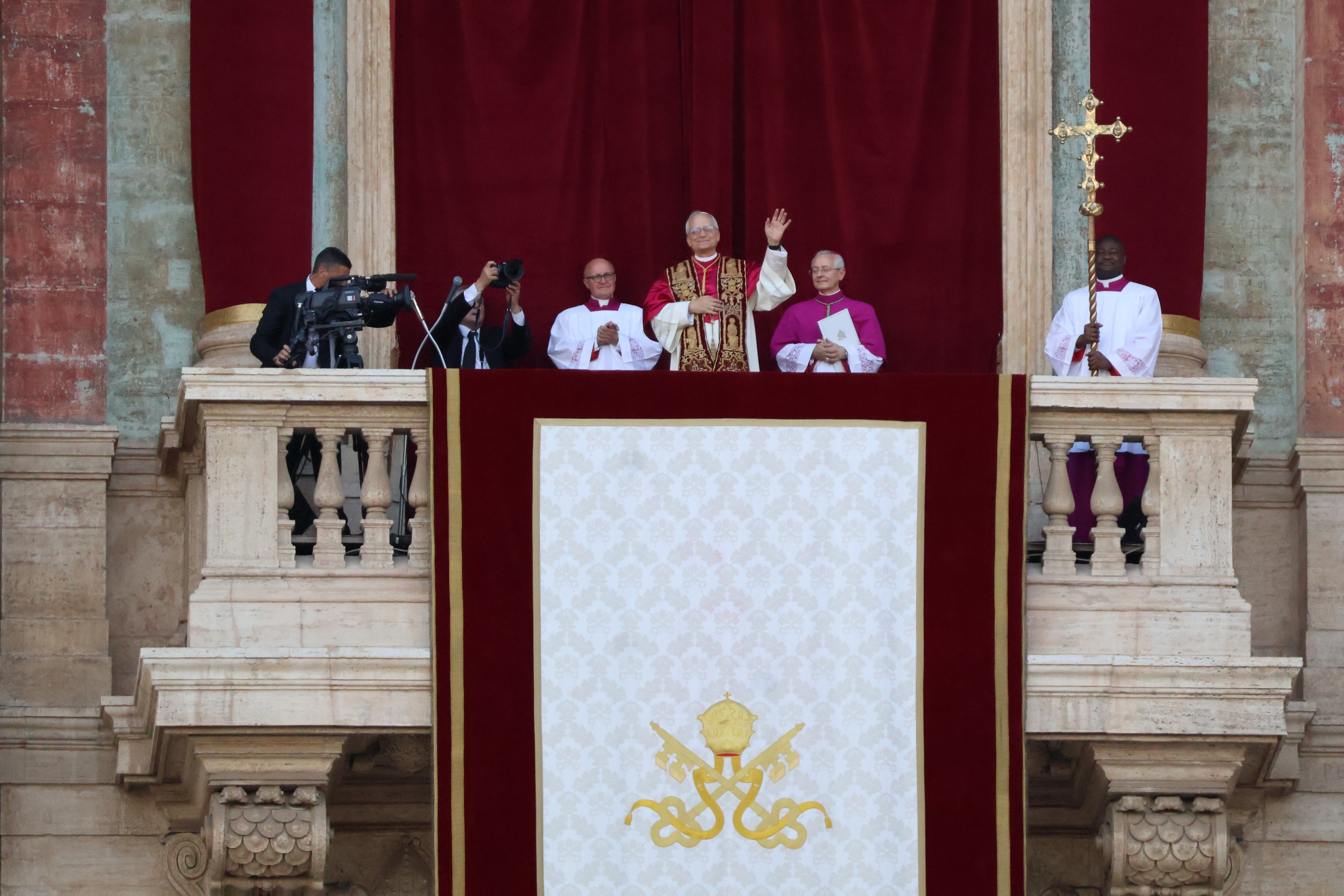
Pope Leo XIV waving from the loggia of St. Peter's Basilica in his first public appearance

In pre-conclave speculation, Prevost was considered a dark horse compared to more prominent papabili, although he was noted to be an ally of Pope Francis and a possible compromise candidate. His U.S. nationality had been regarded as a potential stumbling block to his candidacy, reflecting unease about enhancing the United States's geopolitical power. Prevost was well aware of this, explaining to a friend by text message: "I'm an American, I can't be elected". Supporters argued that he represented a "dignified middle of the road".

Prevost was elected pope on May 8, 2025, the second day of the conclave, on the fourth ballot. As a result, white smoke appeared from the Sistine Chapel at 18:07 CEST (UTC+2), informing the world that a new pope had been chosen. After accepting his election and adopting his papal name, Leo embraced his fellow cardinals upon exiting the Sistine Chapel. Cardinal Dominique Mamberti, the cardinal protodeacon, made the traditional Latin proclamation, Habemus papam, announcing Pope Leo XIV to the public for the first time from the central loggia of St. Peter's Basilica. According to Italian law enforcement, by the time of the habemus papam announcement, there were up to 150,000 people in the square.

Leo appeared wearing the traditional papal stole and mozzetta, vestments Pope Francis did not wear upon his greeting of the world following his election. Leo's pectoral cross was one he wore during the conclave, a gift from the Postulator General of the Augustinian Order when he became a cardinal, containing relics from Saint Augustine and his mother Saint Monica, among others. He then delivered his first address to Rome and the world in Italian, advocating peace and dialogue, expressing gratitude for the legacy of Pope Francis and quoting Augustine; he also greeted his former diocese of Chiclayo, Peru, in Spanish. After the speech, he imparted his first Urbi et Orbi blessing in Latin.

Leo is the first pope to have been born in the United States, and the first to hold U.S. or Peruvian citizenship, having become a dual citizen in 2015 while serving as a missionary and bishop of Chiclayo. He is also the first pope from the Order of Saint Augustine, and the second (after his immediate predecessor Francis) with a Latin American citizenship. He is the second to be a native English speaker, after the English-born Adrian IV (r. 1154–1159), who would have spoken Middle English. Leo is also the first pope born after World War II and during the Cold War, and thus the first to be born in the Baby Boomer generation. While Leo is the first pope from the Order of Saint Augustine, six previous popes belonged to other orders which follow the Augustinian Rule, the last one prior to Leo being Pope Eugene IV (r. 1431–1447).

=== Inauguration ===
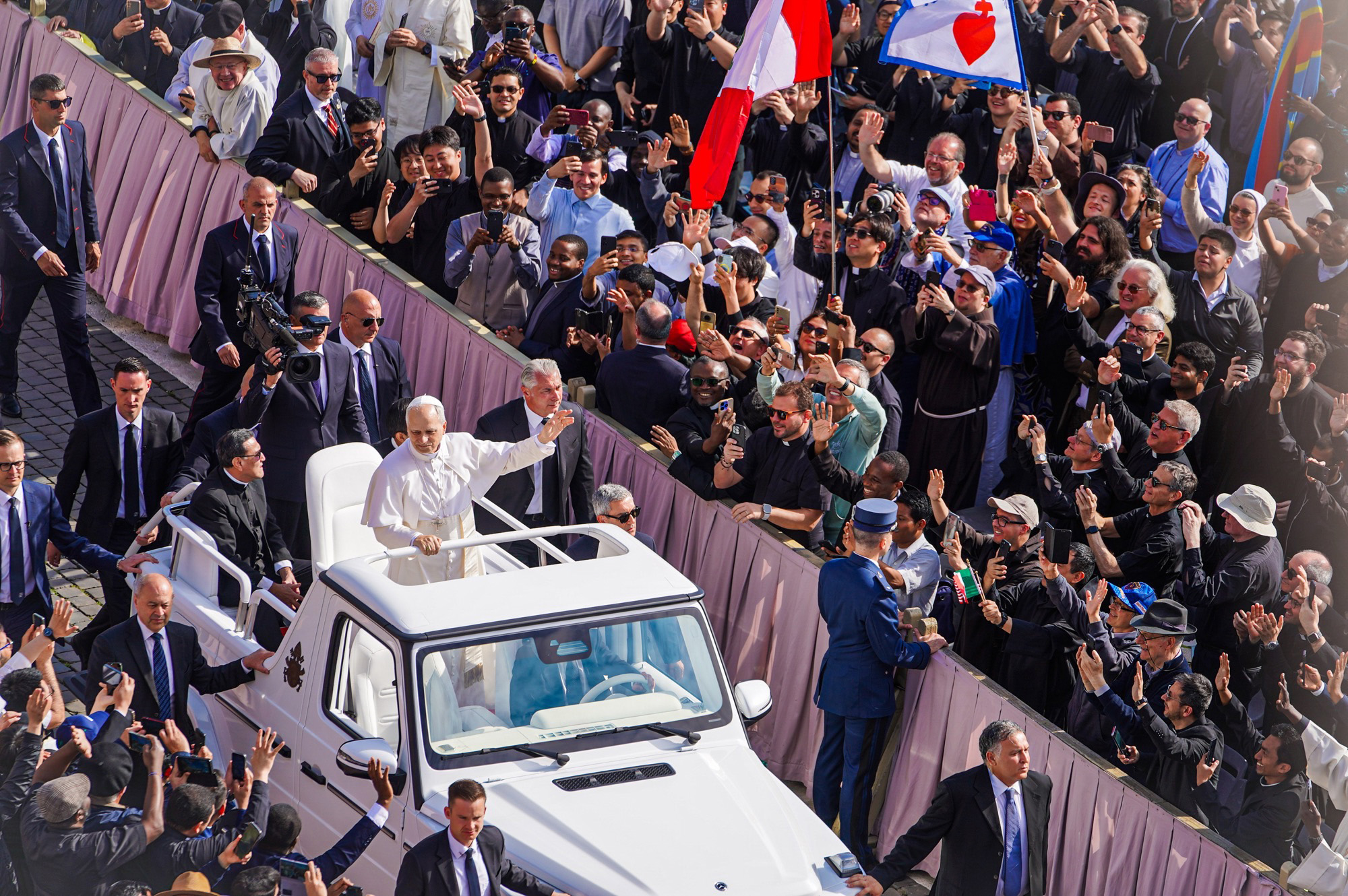
Pope Leo XIV's first popemobile ride during his inauguration

On May 9, the day after his election, Leo celebrated his first Mass as pope in the Sistine Chapel before the assembled College of Cardinals. During the Mass, he preached against the lack of faith in the world, and spoke of a church that would act as a "beacon that illuminates the dark nights of this world". Leo took up permanent residence in the papal apartments in the Apostolic Palace, where most modern popes had lived, rather than in the Domus Sanctae Marthae where Francis had lived.

Leo's inauguration Mass was held on May 18 in St. Peter's Square. During the Mass, he received the pallium and his ring of the fisherman. Catholic dignitaries, including cardinals and bishops, then pledged their obedience to the new pope. On May 25, he was formally installed as bishop of Rome in a ceremony at the Archbasilica of Saint John Lateran, Rome's cathedral.

=== Early acts ===
On July 6, Leo revived the papal practice of taking summer residence at the Castel Gandolfo, which Francis had discontinued. On September 7, Leo presided over the canonization of Carlo Acutis and Pier Giorgio Frassati at a Mass in St Peter's Square. On November 21, Leo signed an amendment to the 2023 law allowing women to become president of the Pontifical Commission for the Vatican City State, removing a requirement that would-be officeholders must hold the rank of cardinal. On April 27, 2026, he met Archbishop of Canterbury Sarah Mullally, the first woman to lead the Church of England. On June 2, 2026, Leo appointed Montse Alvarado, the head of the American Catholic media conglomerate EWTN News, to lead the Vatican's Dicastery for Communication. She is the first female prefect of a dicastery who is not a member of a religious institute.

=== Apostolic journeys ===
Leo made his first apostolic journey, a visit to Turkey and Lebanon, from November 27 to December 2, 2025, arriving in Turkey to commemorate with Patriarch Bartholomew of the Eastern Orthodox Church the 1,700th anniversary of the Council of Nicaea; while in Istanbul, he visited the Blue Mosque and the Armenian Apostolic Cathedral. Leo later visited Lebanon, visiting and praying at the site of the 2020 Beirut explosion and later the tomb of Charbel Makhlouf, returning to Rome on December 2.

His second apostolic journey was a one-day visit to Monaco at the invitation of Prince Albert II on January 17, 2026. The visit was part of the ongoing ties that bind the Grimaldi dynasty to the Holy See to strengthen the "long-standing and trusting" diplomatic relations between the two smallest states in the world.

Pope Leo conducted his third apostolic journey and his first to Africa from April 13–23, 2026, starting with a historic two-day visit to Algeria that marked the first-ever papal trip to the nation. He met with President Abdelmadjid Tebboune and visited the Great Mosque of Algiers in Algiers for interreligious dialogue, then traveled to Annaba for what he described as "spiritual homecoming" to the land of St. Augustine, as he had visited Algeria before as the leader of the Augustinian Order in 2001 and 2013. While there, he hosted Mass at the Basilica of Saint Augustine and visited a care home for the elderly operated by the Little Sisters of the Poor, which had Algerian Muslims. Leo visited Cameroon for a three-day leg to navigate the complex political landscape, which was pre-empted by the first-ever temporary ceasefire of the Anglophone Crisis. Throughout his stay in Yaoundé, Bamenda, and Douala, he denounced corruption and called for peace in the Anglophone regions. He also visited an orphanage, a Catholic hospital, and the Catholic University of Central Africa, where he inaugurated a new campus named after him.

The third leg of the apostolic journey in Africa was a three-day visit in Angola, where he visited Luanda and Saurimo to address the legacy of colonialism. He also visited the Marian shrine in Muxima and led Mass at Our Lady of the Assumption Cathedral. The trip wrapped up with a three-day visit to Equatorial Guinea, where he utilized the visit to challenge what he dubbed the "economy of exclusion" and promote social justice. He inaugurated a new campus of the National University of Equatorial Guinea in Malabo and presided over mass at the Basilica of the Immaculate Conception in Mongomo. On his final day, he visited the prison in Bata and a memorial for the victims of the 2021 explosions before returning to Rome.

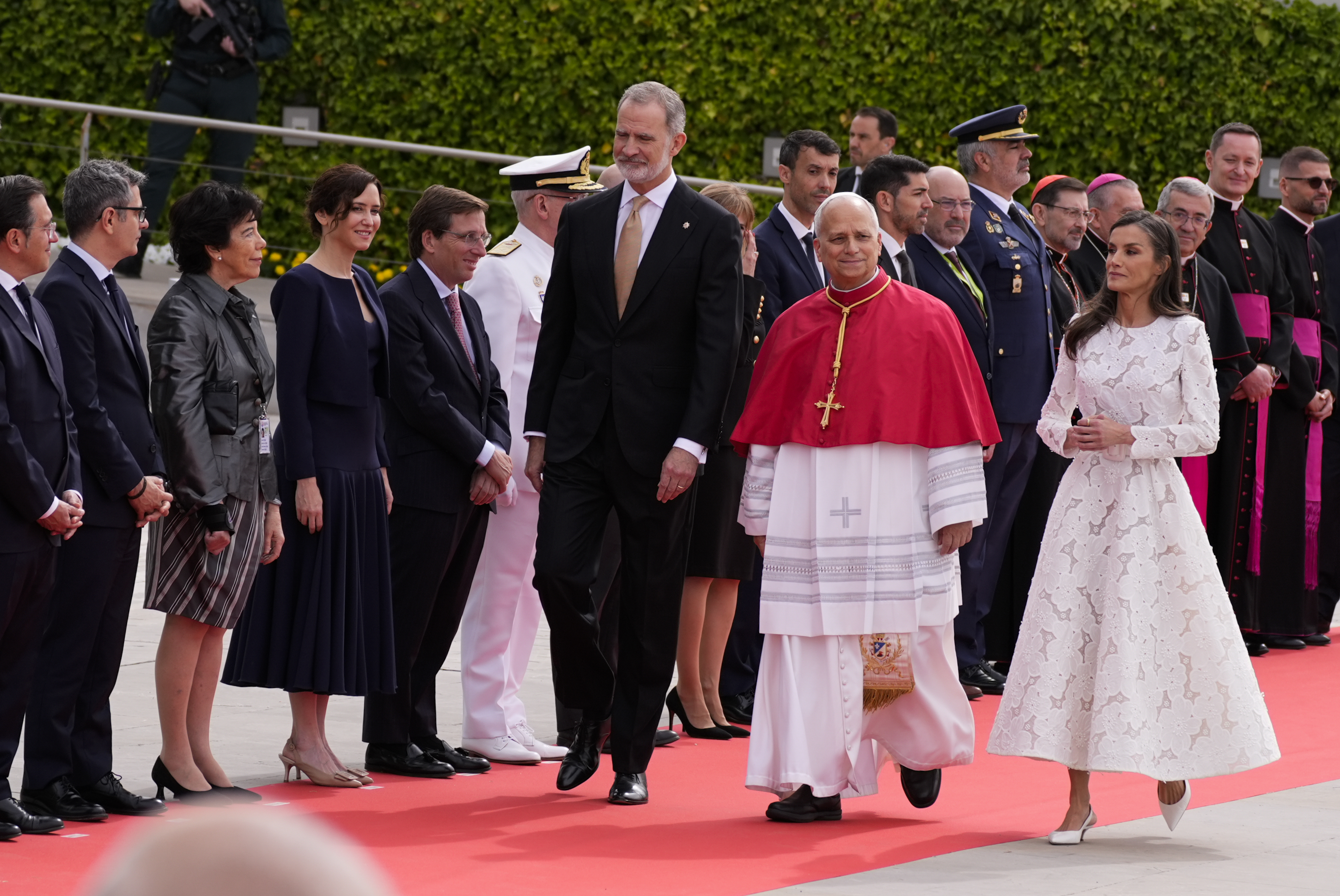
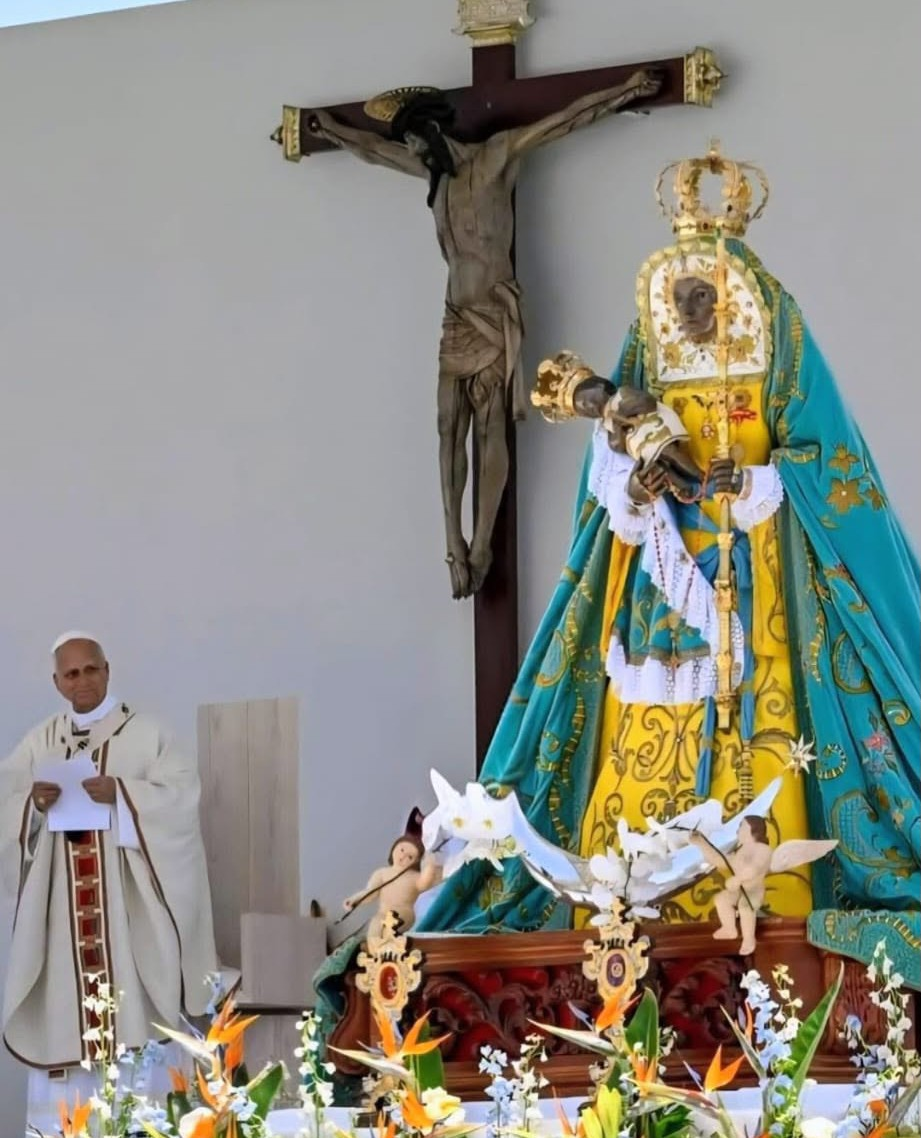
Pope Leo XIV with King Felipe VI and Queen Letizia and other Spanish authorities in his arrival in Madrid, June 6, 2026 (left); Leo XIV during the closing Mass of his apostolic visit to Spain in Santa Cruz de Tenerife. Next to the Pope is the image of Virgin of Candelaria, patron saint of the Canary Islands, June 12, 2026. (right)

Leo's apostolic visit to Spain took place on June 6–12, 2026. He started with an official arrival to Madrid where he met with King Felipe VI, Queen Letizia and prime minister Pedro Sánchez. He celebrated the Feast of Corpus Christi in Madrid, led prayers at the Almudena Cathedral, the Barcelona Cathedral, and the Sagrada Família Basilica in Barcelona, and was the first pope to give a speech in the Cortes Generales. He visited the Santa Maria de Montserrat Abbey and prisoners at the Brians 1 Penitentiary Center. Leo also visited the Canary Islands, specifically Gran Canaria and Tenerife, to meet with migrants.

The Pope visited San Marino on August 22. The visit coincided with the centenary of diplomatic relations between the Holy See and the republic. It was also the third visit of a Pontiff to San Marino after those made by Saint John Paul II in 1982 and Benedict XVI in 2011.

Leo made a four-day apostolic visit to France from September 25–28, 2026, his fifth apostolic trip of 2026. His apostolic visit to France included Paris (UNESCO Headquarters, Notre-Dame de Paris, Stade de France, Place de la Concorde), Lourdes (Sanctuary of Our Lady of Lourdes) and Metz (Metz Cathedral).

On November 6, Leo started a apostolic journey across three countries in Latin America: Uruguay (Montevideo, Paysandú, and Florida), Argentina (Buenos Aires, Córdoba, and Luján), and Peru (Lima, Chiclayo, Cusco, and Pucallpa), scheduled to conclude on November 17, 2026. The trip took place less than a month after he had undergone lung cancer surgery. His stay in Argentina, from November 8 to 11, was the first papal visit to the country since John Paul II's in 1987. In his first speech in the country, addressed to Argentine authorities and civic leaders, Leo said that "the economy must serve the person, not the person the economy", called for economic growth to reach the unemployed, retirees and low-wage workers, and urged investment in education, universities and research; the Associated Press described the address as a diplomatic but pointed critique of President Javier Milei's austerity policies. An open-air Mass in Buenos Aires on November 9 drew an estimated 2.5 million people according to officials, the largest event of his pontificate up to that time. The following day he celebrated Mass for some 650,000 people in Córdoba. On his final day in the country he met inmates at the federal prison in Villa Devoto, which was due to close, and then celebrated Mass at the Basilica of Our Lady of Luján before leaving for Lima. After completing 50 events and drawing an estimated 12–13 million people, Leo brought his 12-day Latin American tour to an end on November 16, 2026. In an emotional farewell in Lima, he told the crowds, “I will always carry you with me. The Peruvian people are my people too.”

=== Excommunication of the SSPX ===
In 2026, the Society of Saint Pius X (SSPX), a traditionalist community not in full communion with Rome, announced plans to consecrate four new bishops without papal approval, after its superior general, Davide Pagliarani, was unable to obtain an audience with Leo. On May 13, the Dicastery for the Doctrine of the Faith warned that such consecrations would constitute a schismatic act and result in automatic excommunication, under canon law, for the consecrating bishops and those they consecrated. Cardinal Secretary of State Pietro Parolin also described the planned act as schismatic.

On June 29, Leo wrote directly to Pagliarani, appealing to the SSPX to abandon the plan and warning that dividing the church was a grave sin. He renewed the appeal in a further letter shortly before the consecrations, telling the SSPX that going ahead would deprive its own followers of "the licit, and in some cases, even valid reception of the sacraments".

The SSPX proceeded regardless, consecrating four new bishops—Pascal Schreiber, Michael Goldade, Michel Poinsinet de Sivry, and Marc Hanappier—on July 1 in Écône, Switzerland, with bishops Bernard Fellay and Alfonso de Galarreta serving as consecrators. The following day, the Dicastery for the Doctrine of the Faith issued a decree declaring that all six bishops involved had incurred automatic (latae sententiae) excommunication and that the SSPX was in a state of schism.

The episode echoed the SSPX's founding rupture with Rome: in 1988, its founder, Archbishop Marcel Lefebvre, consecrated four bishops without papal mandate, and the Vatican under Pope John Paul II excommunicated him and the newly consecrated bishops within days.

All SSPX clergy are considered by the Holy See to be automatically excommunicated for schism. (Note: Under canon 1364 §1, schism incurs automatic excommunication. For lay faithful, this applies only to those who "formally adhere" to the SSPX, per a 1996 test with two elements: an internal one, freely choosing loyalty to the Lefebvrist movement over obedience to the Pope, and an external one, shown by exclusively attending SSPX liturgies rather than those of the Catholic Church. Occasional attendance alone does not meet this standard. All SSPX clergy are considered to satisfy both elements automatically through their ministry within the movement.) The same penalty extends to some portion of the SSPX's estimated 600,000 lay followers worldwide, though under the 1996 test it applies only to those who attend SSPX liturgies exclusively rather than occasionally. Canon law separately holds that Catholics may not licitly receive sacraments from ministers not in communion with Rome except in narrow cases of necessity. (Note: Canon 844 permits Catholics to receive sacraments from non-Catholic ministers only in specific circumstances of danger of death or grave necessity, and conversely allows Catholic ministers to administer sacraments to certain non-Catholic Christians under defined conditions. It does not create a general exception for attendance at SSPX liturgies.) The SSPX has no canonical status within the Catholic Church. The resulting schism has become the Catholic Church's largest in at least 156 years, and has been described as the first major test of Leo's pontificate.

== Views ==
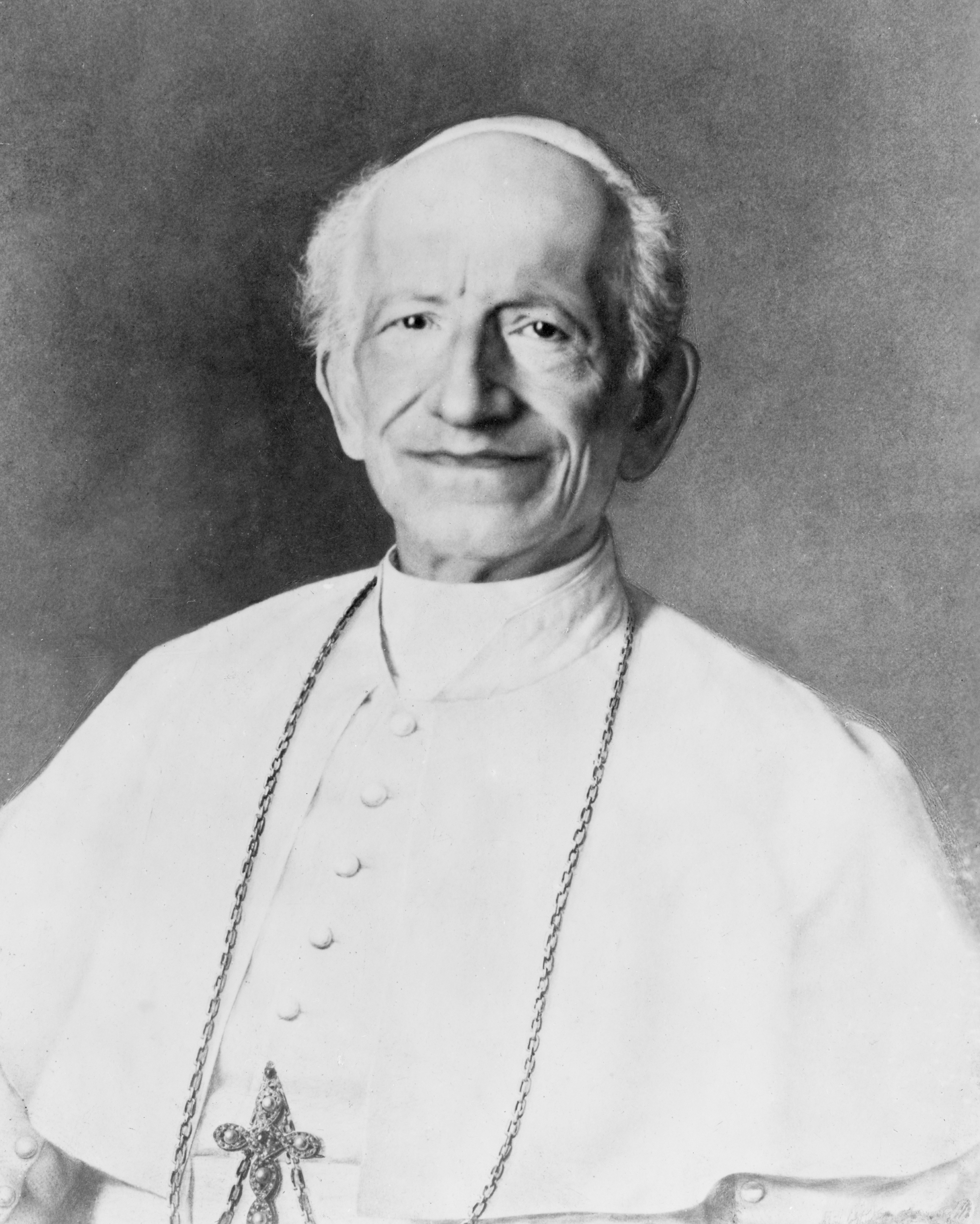
Prevost chose the papal name Leo in honor of Pope Leo XIII's social teachings.

Prevost's regnal name was chosen following Pope Leo XIII (r. 1878–1903), whose encyclical Rerum novarum established modern Catholic social teaching and promoted labor rights. According to the Holy See Press Office director Matteo Bruni, this choice is "clearly a reference to the lives of men and women, to their work – even in an age marked by artificial intelligence". Leo XIV confirmed the association with Leo XIII in an address to the World Meeting of Popular Movements in October 2025.

Cardinal Fernando Chomali of Chile said that Leo told him that the choice of papal name is based on his concern about the world's cultural shifts, a type of Copernican Revolution involving artificial intelligence and robotics. Chomali said: "He was inspired by Leo XIII, who amid the Industrial Revolution wrote Rerum novarum, launching an important dialogue between the church and the modern world." Leo XIV himself explained that "the church offers to everyone the treasury of her social teaching in response to another industrial revolution and to developments in the field of artificial intelligence that pose new challenges for the defense of human dignity, justice, and labor."

The National Catholic Reporter stated that Leo XIV was committed to ecumenism with other Christian denominations. At his inauguration, he referenced "sister Christian churches" and prayed for "a united church, a sign of unity and communion, which becomes a leaven for a reconciled world".

Leo has said religious freedom is "not optional but essential". During an audience with pontifical charity Aid to the Church in Need, before the launch of its Religious Freedom in the World Report in October 2025, Leo said that the right to religious freedom is "a cornerstone of any just society, for it safeguards the moral space in which conscience may be formed and exercised", adding that "religious freedom, therefore, is not merely a legal right or a privilege granted to us by governments; it is a foundational condition that makes authentic reconciliation possible."

During a weekly General Audience, Leo warned against fundamentalist readings of scripture, saying that to "renounce the study of the human words that God used risks leading to fundamentalist or spiritualist readings of Scripture, which betray its meaning."

=== Church policy ===
The new pope's first message emphasized the greeting of peace of the risen Jesus "who gave his life for God's flock", giving "an unarmed and disarming peace". Leo said he wanted to continue the kerygmatic blessing of Pope Francis: "God cares for you, God loves you all, and evil will not prevail! We are all in God's hands." The themes in his first message included Jesus as light needed by the world, becoming a missionary church through dialogue and openness, fidelity to the Gospel, walking together in synodality, working as a united church for peace and justice, closeness to the suffering, and praying to Mary. Twice he mentioned the need of not having fear, and emphasized God's help to "build bridges" for "all of us to be one people always in peace."

In his first address as pope to the cardinals, Leo declared his "complete commitment" to the ecclesial path traced by the Second Vatican Council. He praised Pope Francis's specification of this path through Evangelii Gaudium, the Joy of the Gospel, and highlighted six "evangelical principles", which he deems as perennial and revelatory of God's mercy: the primacy of Christ in proclamation; the missionary conversion of the entire Christian community; collegiality and synodality; attention to the sensus fidei, the capacity of the whole faithful to sense the faith, especially popular piety; loving care for the least and the rejected; and dialogue with the contemporary world. He continues to promote the work of the Second Vatican Council, devoting his weekly audience to rereadings of its documents and calling the council's teachings the "guiding star" of the church.

Leo XIV's episcopal motto is In illo Uno unum ("In the One, we are one"). On the official start of his pontificate, during the inaugural Mass, he requested that "our first great desire be for a united Church, a sign of unity and communion, which becomes a leaven for a reconciled world." Noting that there is "too much discord" in the world, he stressed that "the two dimensions of the mission" of the papacy is "love and unity", as its authority is "a question of loving as Jesus did."

Discussing the ordination of women in October 2023, Prevost stated that the "very significant and long tradition of the church" makes it impossible to consider women as priests and that "the apostolic tradition is something that has been spelled out very clearly." By contrast, he observed that the possibility of women deacons has been the subject of two Vatican commissions, demonstrating "openness to giving consideration" to that question. He also cautioned that the ordination of women as deacons "doesn't necessarily solve a problem" and could create new issues. Commenting on Pope Francis's 2023 appointment of three women as members of the Dicastery for Bishops, which he headed, he noted that their perspectives often align with other members but can introduce new valuable viewpoints.

As a cardinal, Prevost was a vocal proponent of synodality, one of Pope Francis's signature initiatives. Prevost suggested that the participation and co-responsibility of all the faithful could address the polarization in the church. In May 2023, Prevost said that episcopal leadership should prioritize faith over administration. The first priority is to "communicate the beauty of the faith, the beauty and joy of knowing Jesus." Also in May 2023, Prevost said he has faith that "the Holy Spirit is [...] pushing us towards a renewal." He stated that all the faithful are "called to the great responsibility of living what I call a new attitude," which is "to listen first of all to the Holy Spirit, to what He is asking of the Church."

The pope is expected to have an expanded role for the College of Cardinals in his papacy. In January 2026, he announced he would like to meet with them annually as a group of advisors.

=== Liturgical and ceremonial practice ===
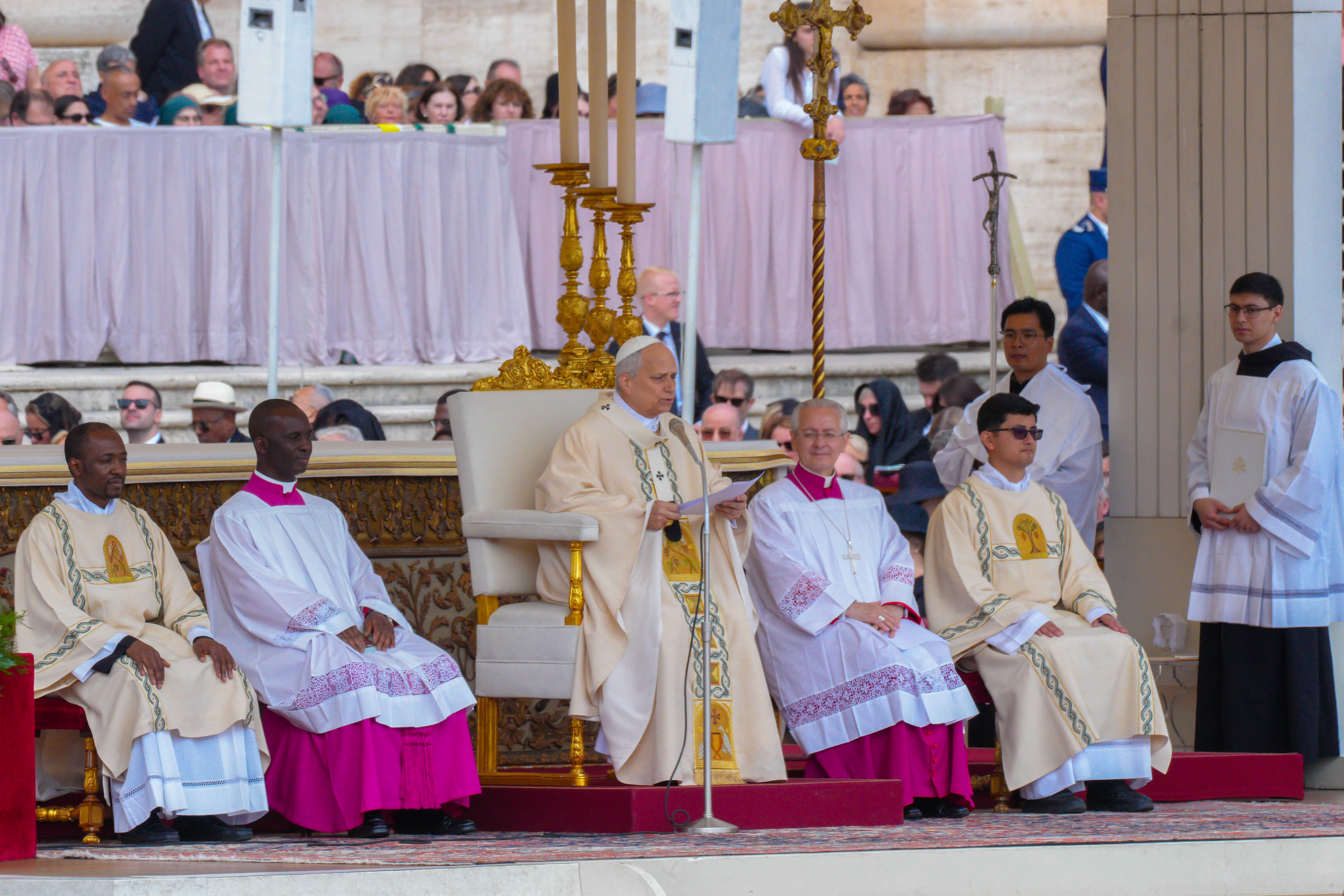
Pope Leo XIV presiding over his inaugural papal Mass

During his time in Peru, Prevost was described as an "impeccable dresser" when it came to celebrating the Mass, wearing full vestments even when summer temperatures rose above 85 °F (about 29 °C) in Chiclayo. Prevost described himself as "very obedient" in liturgical matters, and urged that the liturgy be prepared "in the best way possible." He was described as a "say the black, do the red" type of priest by the pastor of the cathedral, referring to rubrical (printed in red) instructions in the Roman Missal. In August 2024, speaking to a Chicago-area parish, Prevost stated that "liturgy needs to be beautiful to help us, to strengthen us in our faith." In his first Mass in the Sistine Chapel as pope, he chose to use a papal ferula, or ceremonial staff, made for Benedict XVI and seldom used by Francis. The mozzetta worn after his election, and Benedict's ferula signaled to some a "return to normal" in the Holy See following the Francis papacy. However, during his Inauguration Mass in St. Peter's Square on May 18, 2025, Leo XIV used the ferula of Pope Paul VI which is most commonly associated with Pope John Paul II, and frequently used by Francis.

Leo received another pectoral cross upon his election, which he has been wearing instead of the one he wore during the conclave and his first appearance as pope. This one is silver, with relics of Leo the Great, Augustine, Thomas of Villanova, and Anselmo Polanco Fontecha. He also chose to restore the custom of the pope himself giving archbishops the pallium, which had been altered by Francis in 2015. In September 2025, it was announced that Leo had given permission for the Tridentine Mass to be said in St. Peter's Basilica the following month, the first time such permission had been granted since the promulgation of Traditionis custodes in 2021.

In November 2026, Leo stated, regarding Traditionis Custodes, that "we will continue to follow it".

=== Social and political issues ===
Within the context of church politics and theology, Prevost has been seen as a moderate or centrist, neither liberal nor conservative. In April 2025, the Italian newspaper la Repubblica stated that Prevost was seen as a "cosmopolitan and shy figure" who was "appreciated by conservatives and progressives" within the church. (Note: The positions of cardinals are difficult to pinpoint in political terms and different labels, more specific to the Church's context like sinodali (supporters of synodality), lealisti (loyalists, the supporters of the reigning pope), and tradizionalisti (traditionalists), are applied. Nonetheless, Prevost was generally seen as a "reformer of the Bergoglian area", not far from other more progressive names such as Pietro Parolin and Luis Antonio Tagle, and more moderate than others such as Robert Walter McElroy and Matteo Maria Zuppi.)

==== Diplomacy ====
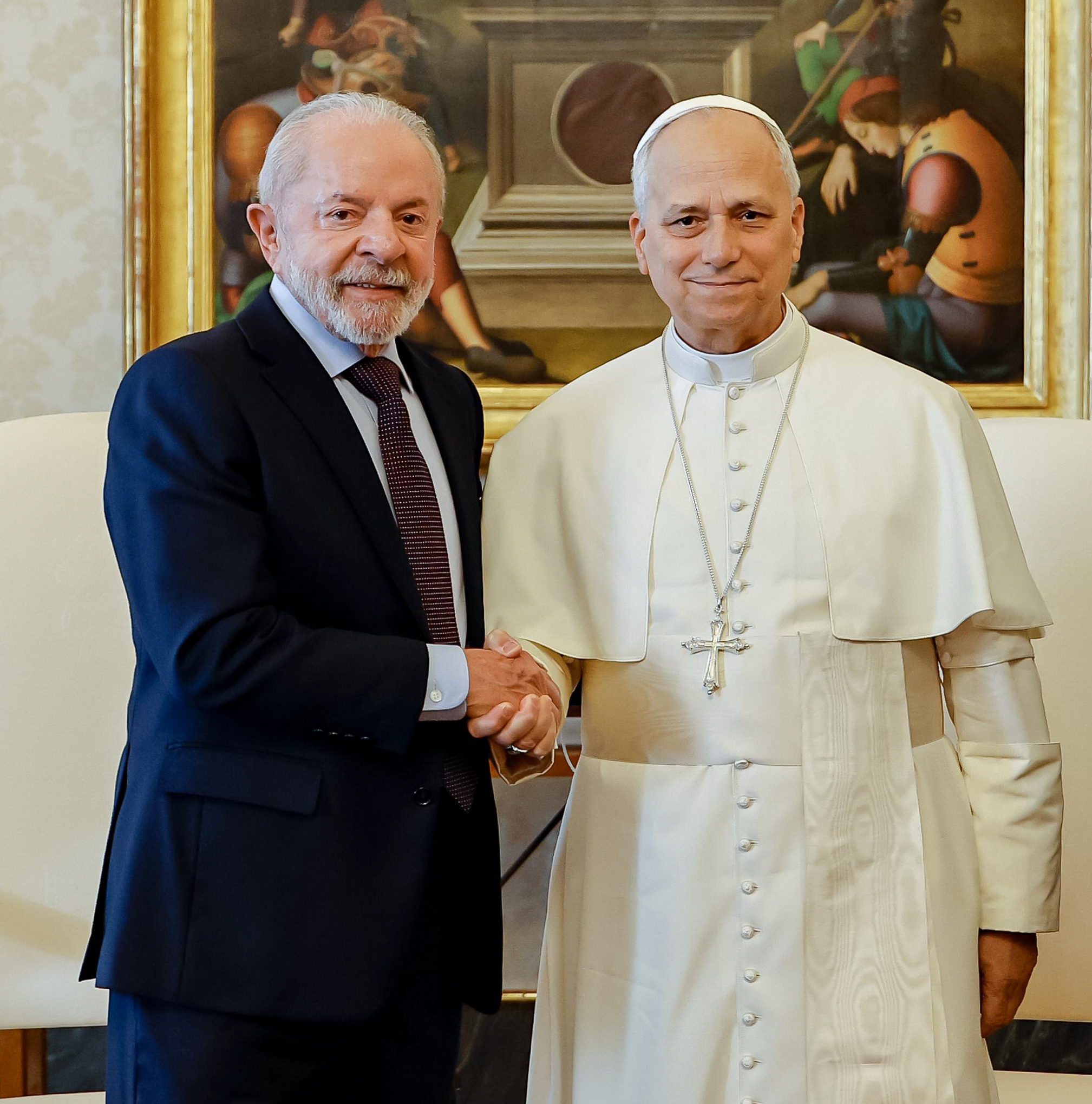
Leo with President of Brazil Luiz Inácio Lula da Silva in October 2025

Leo has consistently advocated against armed conflict. Prior to his papacy, in Chiclayo, Prevost remained relatively politically neutral on Peruvian national issues. However, in the midst of the Peruvian protests in 2023, he stated: "The deaths during the protests cause me great sadness and pain [...] I asked to stay in Peru; I even made that request to the Holy Father. It wasn't the time to leave." He has also expressed support for the plight of Venezuelan refugees in Peru.

Leo has condemned the Russian invasion of Ukraine, describing it as a "senseless war" and saying Ukraine is "martyred". He has appealed to Russian leaders to end the conflict. In one of his first major speeches as pope, Leo called for a ceasefire in the Gaza war. Following the Israeli strikes on Iran in June 2025, he urged Iranian and Israeli authorities to act with "reason". He has issued prayers for those affected by the clashes in southern Syria and the 2025 Cambodia–Thailand clashes. He called for a ceasefire and humanitarian aid following the El Fasher massacre in Sudan. He has criticized the United States' military strikes near Venezuela. Leo has also expressed concern regarding the intensification of violence in Syria and in Iran, calling for dialogue and peace. Leo was nominated for the 2026 Nobel Peace Prize.

==== Immigration and nationalism ====
In his Pentecost homily soon after his election as pope, Leo criticized the "exclusionary mindset" displayed by various nationalist movements. The Holy Spirit "breaks down barriers and tears down the walls of indifference and hatred", he said. To Leo, areas advertised as "security zones" had the effect of "separating us from our neighbors" and spreading "prejudice". He proclaimed that the church needed to "open the borders between peoples and break down the barriers between class and race." The pope has also spoken with sympathy for migrants, hoping to visit the Canary Islands where many migrants enter Europe. Leo has also defended the right of nations to control immigration, stating "If someone is in the United States illegally, there are ways to address this. There are courts. There is a judicial system....I think every country has the right to determine who enters, how, and when." Additionally, Leo has stated that migrants are obligated to culturally assimilate in a new country, including by learning the official language, following local customs, and obeying the law.

The pope has repeatedly expressed criticism and concern about the treatment of migrants in the United States, particularly in facilities operated by Immigration and Customs Enforcement (ICE). In September 2025, he reiterated past criticisms of the second Trump administration, remarking to a group of journalists that "someone who says 'I am against abortion but I am in agreement with the inhuman treatment of immigrants in the United States,' I don't know if that's pro-life." White House press secretary Karoline Leavitt denied Leo's claims of maltreatment. That October, Leo urged labor unions in his home city of Chicago to fight for immigrants' rights. In November, he called for a "deep reflection" about American immigration policy and asked that detainees' "spiritual rights" be upheld via access to clergy.

==== Consistent life ethic ====
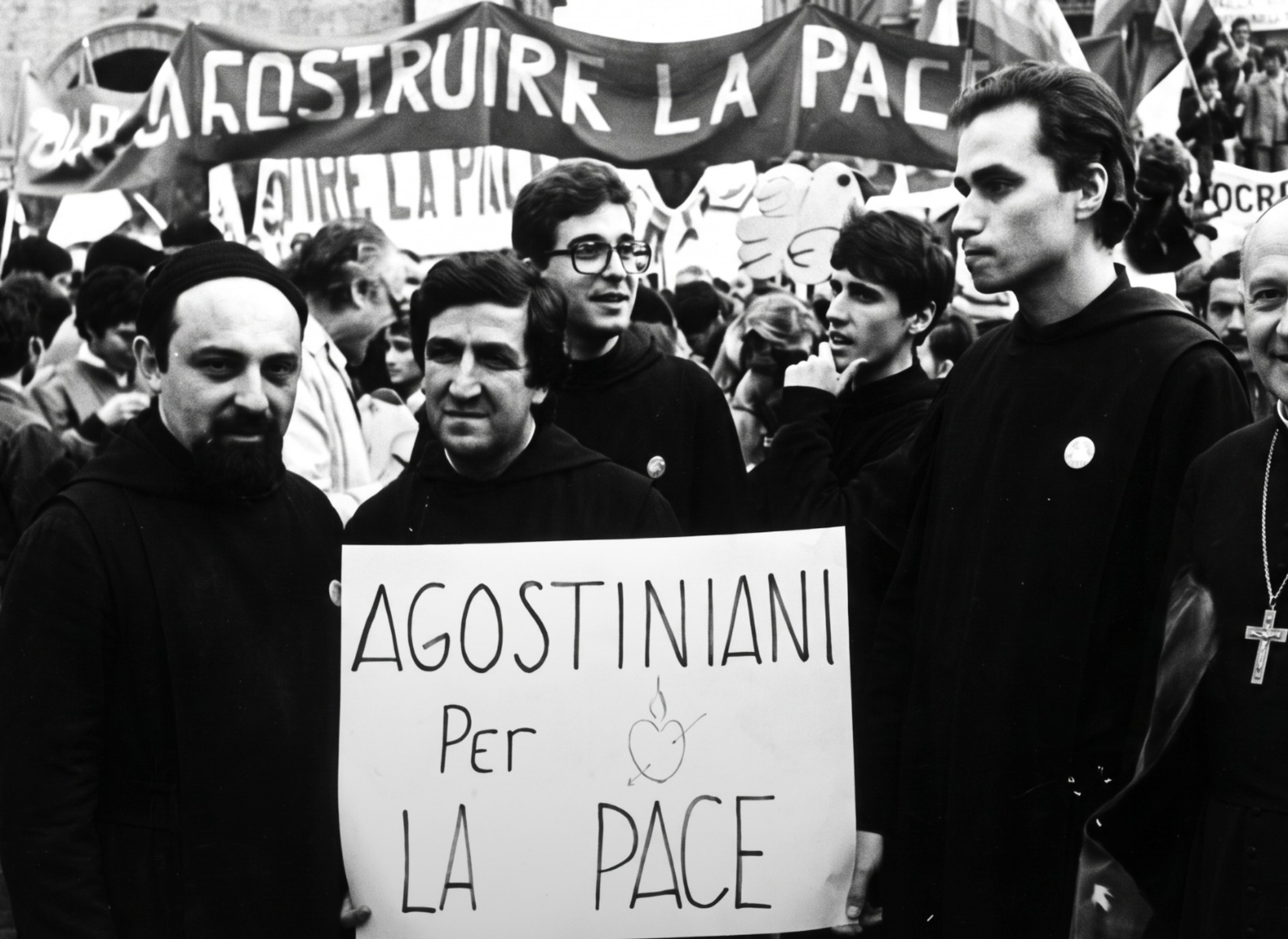
Prevost (right) at a peace rally with fellow Augustinians in Rome in 1983, protesting the installation of NATO missiles. It was organized by a coalition of pacifist groups, including organizations connected to the Italian Communist Party.

Leo's positions on abortion, euthanasia, and the death penalty are consistent with Catholic Church teachings. He has issued statements against abortion during his pontificate.

Leo has opposed euthanasia. He expressed caution against the euthanasia policy in Canada. He said that euthanasia, along with abortion, "discard the weakest", and disregard the value of life. He has also stated "We cannot build a just society if we discard the weakest—whether the child in the womb or the elderly in their frailty—for they are both gifts from God." In December 2025, Leo said he was "very disappointed" that his home state of Illinois approved a bill allowing for medically assisted suicide. He said he had spoken with Governor JB Pritzker and urged him to not sign the bill into law.

Leo opposes the death penalty. In October 2025, he stated, "Someone who says, 'I'm against abortion but says I am in favor of the death penalty' is not really pro-life."

Leo has specifically called out violence against women. He has condemned femicide, calling it both painful and tragic and attributing it to "an unhealthy desire for domination."

==== LGBTQ+ issues ====
Prevost expressed reservations about "sympathy for beliefs and practices that contradict the gospel" and did not fully endorse or reject Fiducia supplicans, a declaration concerning blessings for people in a same-sex relationship. He stated that national bishops' conferences should "interpret and apply such directives in their local contexts, given cultural differences." On a flight to Rome after a visit to African countries, Pope Leo praised Francis' approach to the topic but opposed formalizing the blessings. Referring to "sexual matters", Leo said he believes there are "more important issues such as justice, equality, freedom of men and women, freedom of religion that would all take priority before that particular issue."

In 2012, Prevost criticized popular culture's sympathy for the "homosexual lifestyle" and same-sex families. In April 2016, he opposed the inclusion of "gender ideology" in Peruvian primary school curricula, stating, "There are men and women, and we must respect the dignity of each person, including the choices that adults may have. Telling a child that they have not yet reached a sufficient level of development to choose regarding sexual identity and orientation will create a lot of confusion". When asked in 2023 by Catholic News Service whether his views from 2012 had changed, Prevost said that "many things have changed" and emphasized the church should be more open and welcoming though he cautioned that church doctrine has not changed.

In May 2025, Leo said that it was up to governments to build peaceful societies "above all by investing in the family, founded upon the stable union between a man and a woman." In September 2025, Leo allegedly told the priest James J. Martin, an advocate for greater LGBTQ+ inclusion in the church, that he would continue Francis' legacy of welcoming LGBTQ+ people into the church, with Martin telling the Associated Press that their discussion "was very consoling and very encouraging and frankly a lot of fun." In February 2026, Leo stated, "People want Church doctrine to change and they want attitudes to change: I believe that we must first change attitudes, before even thinking about changing what the Church teaches on a particular issue." He also said that "The teaching of the Church will continue to remain as it is" in regards to same-sex marriage and transgender issues. Leo met representatives of Courage International, a Catholic ministry for LGBTQ Catholics on February 6, 2026. The group said on the occasion: "The opportunity to share with the Holy Father the works of the apostolate, to provide pastoral accompaniment to persons who experience same-sex attraction but who strive to live chaste lives or to accompany family members who have a loved one who identifies as LGBTQ, was a momentous occasion".

==== US politics ====
Throughout his time as a bishop and as a cardinal, Prevost continued to vote in both state and federal elections in the United States, being a registered voter in Will County, Illinois. Illinois election law does not require voters to register affiliation with a political party, and Prevost has never officially done so. The primary elections Prevost has voted in include the 2008 Democratic presidential primary, the Democratic primary for the 2010 Illinois gubernatorial election, the 2012 Republican presidential primary, the Republican primary for the 2014 Illinois gubernatorial election, and the 2016 Republican presidential primary. Prevost voted in every United States general election since 2000, with the exception of 2020 and 2022.

As pope, he voted in the 2026 United States midterm elections, making him the first pontiff to vote in secular elections after ascension to the papacy. Pope Pius XII reiterated in 1946 and 1948 that the Catholic Church teaches that Catholics have a grave moral obligation to vote.

On the social media platform X, Prevost's former account reposted posts critical of US immigration policies under President Donald Trump and Vice President JD Vance. The pope has supported various gun control measures. In 2025, Leo denounced what he called a "pandemic of arms" after the Annunciation Catholic Church shooting. His X account which he used prior to his election as pope has since been deleted and he is currently using the official @Pontifex handle, inherited from Popes Benedict XVI and Francis.

In April 2026, amidst the 2026 Iran war, Leo said that Donald Trump's threats against Iranian civilization and infrastructure were "truly unacceptable" and encouraged people to contact political leaders and members of Congress to "tell them to work for peace and to reject war." Trump subsequently directly criticized him in a Truth Social post, writing that "Pope Leo is WEAK on Crime, and terrible for Foreign Policy". He also referred to the pope as "too liberal." Leo responded, stating that "I have no fear of the Trump administration," and cited being a peacekeeper as a message of the Gospel.

==== Climate change ====
With regards to climate change, the pope has advocated stronger church action, stating in a November 2024 seminar that "dominion over nature" should not be "tyrannical". He called for environmental protection, supporting the installation of solar panels and electric vehicles. His stance is consistent with his predecessor's environmental advocacy outlined in Laudato si'. Shortly after his election in 2025, he praised the document and said that it was "even more relevant today", ten years after it was written.

==== Artificial intelligence ====
Leo XIV is critical of emerging "artificial intelligence" technologies, calling them an "anthropological challenge". He has warned that the technology can "interfere with information ecosystems." He has stated that he believes a more profound risk is that, in mimicking human faces and voices, the technology encroaches "upon the deepest level of communication, that of human relationships." He has stated that using technology instead of humanity to create texts, music, and videos will reduce people into "passive consumers of unthought thoughts and anonymous products without ownership or love" and "[bury] the talents we have been given".

As Pope, he refused to give official sanction for an AI replica of himself intended to answer questions about the Catholic faith, saying, "If there's anybody who should not be represented by an avatar, I would say the pope is high on the list." He has said that artificial intelligence "will never be able to share faith" and that seeking "illusion on the internet, on TikTok" cannot replace an authentic spiritual connection. He asked the clergy of the Diocese of Rome to resist "the temptation to prepare homilies with artificial intelligence."

Leo's first encyclical, Magnifica humanitas, dealt with these matters in depth. In it, he said that "artificial intelligences do not undergo experiences, do not possess a body, do not feel joy or pain, do not mature through relationships...nor do they have a moral conscience...a form of statistical adaptation...does not imply inner growth."

== Personal life and health ==
In addition to his native English, Leo speaks Spanish, Italian, French, and Portuguese, as well as some German. He can also read Latin. During his time in Peru, Leo learned a little of one of the Quechuan languages. He has described himself as "quite the amateur tennis player", and still plays tennis when at Castel Gandolfo. He is the first pope who writes his own emails and wears a smartwatch, specifically an Apple Watch. He regularly plays Wordle and Words with Friends with his brothers. Leo stated that his favorite films are It's a Wonderful Life (1946), The Sound of Music (1965), Ordinary People (1980), and Life Is Beautiful (1997).

Leo is a lifelong fan of the Chicago White Sox of Major League Baseball, and was in attendance at US Cellular Field for Game 1 of the 2005 World Series. In 2025, a commemorative plaque was placed at the seat where he watched the World Series game. His support for Chicago sports also extends to the National Football League's Chicago Bears; United States vice president JD Vance presented him with a custom Bears jersey following his papal inauguration, which Leo remarked was a "good choice". He has also shown support for Villanova University athletics, especially the Villanova Wildcats men's basketball team.

As a teenager, Prevost enjoyed driving recreationally. Throughout his life, he has frequently preferred driving long distances for journeys where most people would prefer to fly, such as from Philadelphia to Chicago, Brisbane to Sydney, and Chiclayo to Lima. He also repaired cars himself as a bishop in Chiclayo.

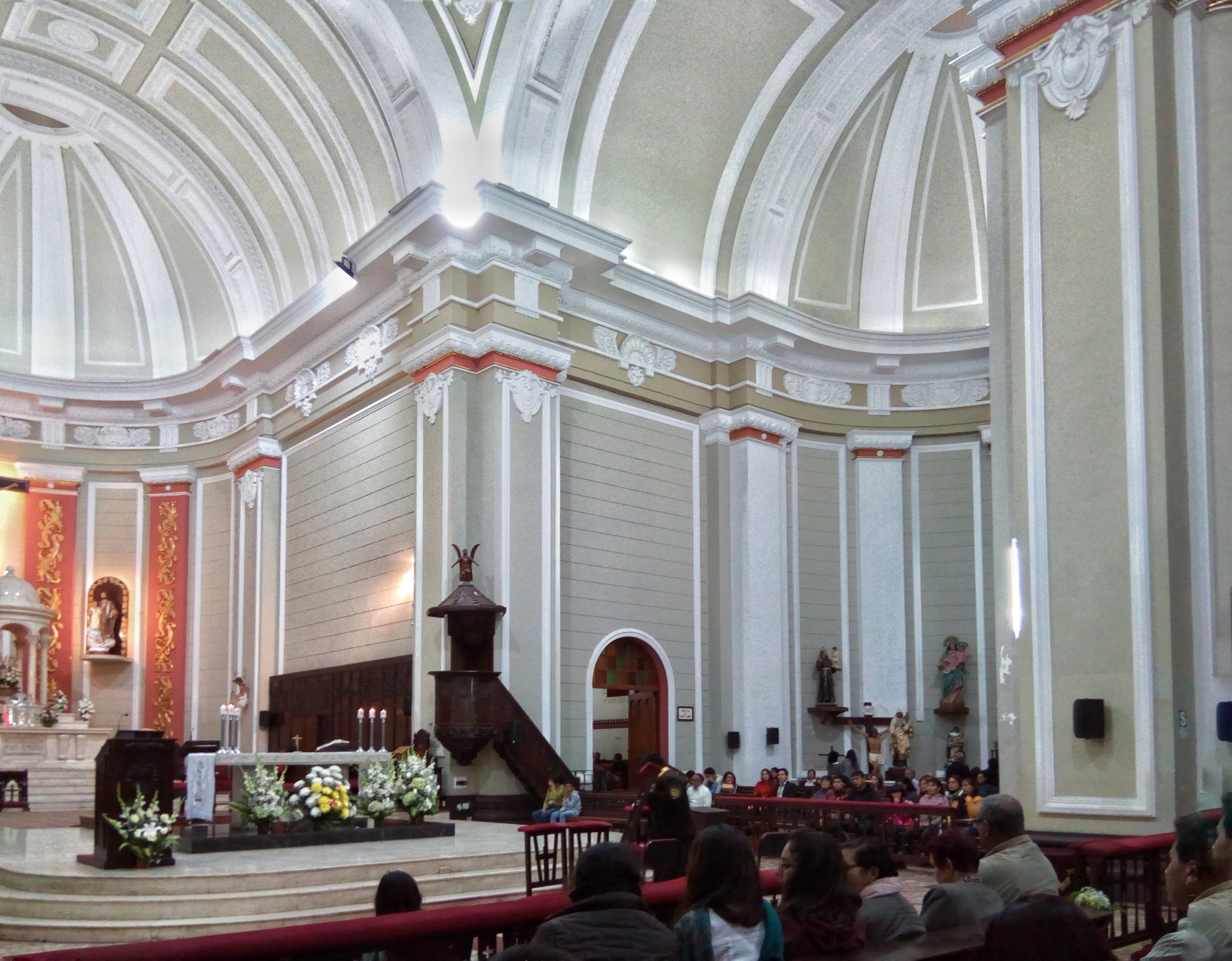
The interior of St. Mary Cathedral in Chiclayo, where Pope Leo prayed daily as its bishop, in 2018

During his time as bishop of Chiclayo, aside from daily Mass celebrated at 8pm (he preferred to celebrate Mass in the evening when his mind was clearer), Prevost had periods of prayer at the beginning of the day and before dinner. He prayed lauds in the morning at the Cathedral and the rosary with his priest colleagues around noon.

Aside from Augustine, the greatest influence on his personal spirituality is the book The Practice of the Presence of God, by Brother Lawrence, which is about developing an awareness of the presence of God in everyday life and continually conversing with God.

During the Angelus prayer on October 11, 2026, Leo announced that he had a lung nodule that would be removed within the following week. The Pope was admitted into the Gemelli Hospital on October 13, 2026. Following the surgery on October 13, it was reported that the nodule showed signs of adenocarcinoma, the most common lung cancer. The surgery involved the removal of the lower lobe of his right lung. On October 21, 2026, doctors confirmed that no further treatment was necessary.

== Distinctions ==
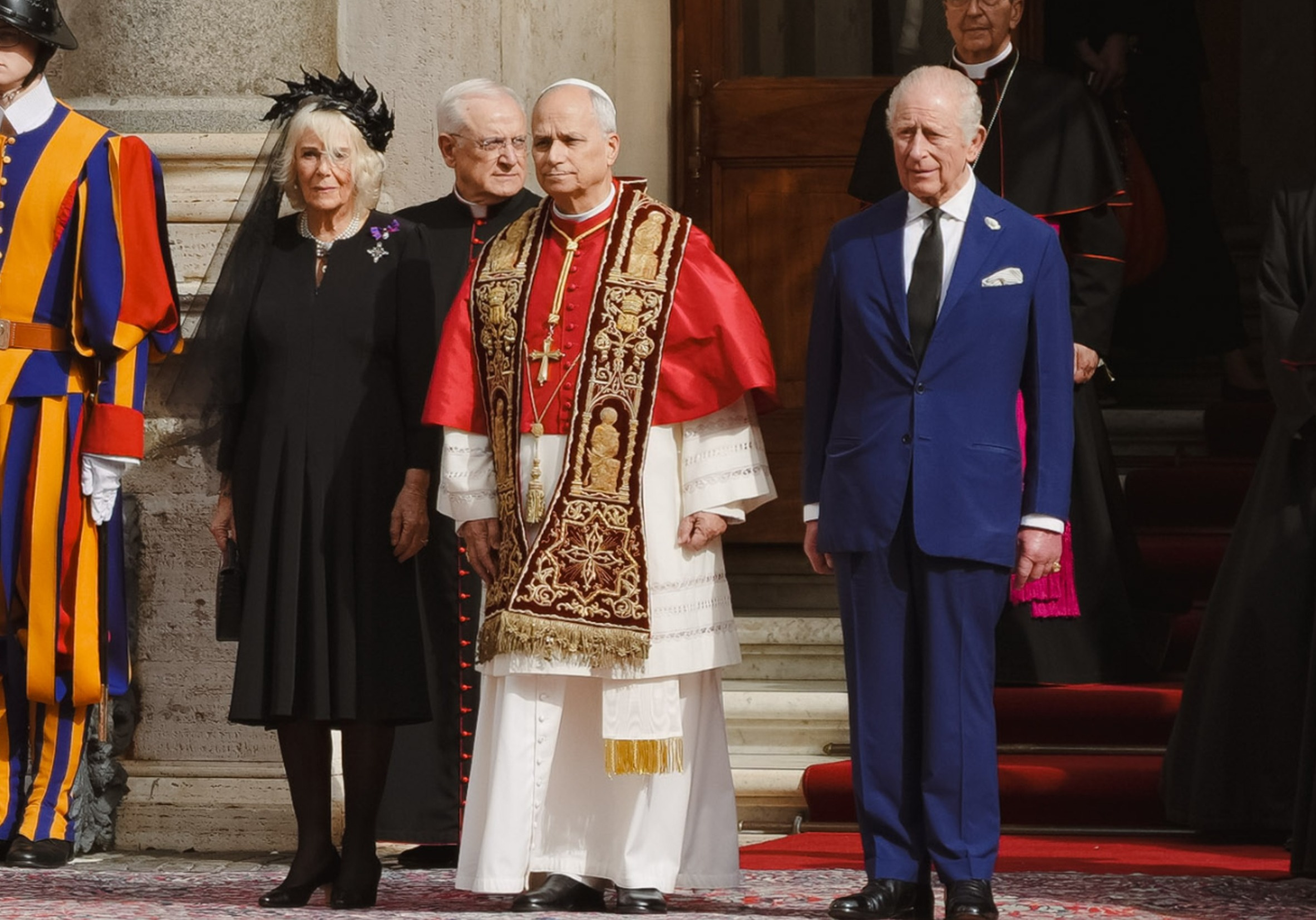
Leo with King Charles III and Queen Camilla during the King's visit to the Vatican, October 2025

=== Foreign orders ===
- Sovereign Military Order of Malta: : Bailiff Grand Cross of Honour and Devotion of the Sovereign Military Order of Malta. Appointed on February 11, 2025, by its Grand Master Fra' John T. Dunlap.
- United Kingdom: : Honorary Knight Grand Cross of the Most Honourable Order of the Bath (Hon. GCB; October 23, 2025). Appointed by King Charles III on the occasion of the King's state visit to the Holy See.

=== Awards and honorary distinctions ===
- Honorary Doctor of Humanities from Villanova University in 2014.
- Named among the world's 100 most influential people in artificial Intelligence by Time magazine in 2025. Leo was included in Time magazine's "100 Most Influential People of 2026".
- Title of Papal Confrater of St. George's Chapel in Windsor Castle by King Charles III (October 23, 2025).
- Honorary 10th dan degree in taekwondo by Choue Chung-won, the president of World Taekwondo (June 2026).
- : 2026 Liberty Medal. Awarded March 17, 2026, by the National Constitution Center, which honors "men and women of courage and conviction who strive to secure the blessings of liberty for people around the globe". Leo received the award on July 3, 2026, the eve of the United States semiquincentennial.

=== Honorific eponyms and dedications ===
In 2026, a species of pyralid moth, Pyralis papaleonei, was named in honor of Pope Leo XIV.

== Coat of arms ==
Coat of arms of Pope Leo XIV
Helm Mitre Escutcheon Per bend sinister azure and argent, in the first, a fleur-de-lis argent, in the second, a heart enflamed pierced by an arrow bendwise sinister, all gules, upon a book proper. Motto IN ILLO UNO UNUM (Latin for 'In the One, [we are] one') Other elements Keys of Peter behind the shield and papal mantling Symbolism Fleur-de-lis: Associated with the Virgin Mary, symbolizing purity and innocence. Augustinian emblem: Emblem of the Order of Saint Augustine, in reference to Leo XIV being a member of the Augustinian Order. This charge displays a red heart pierced by an arrow and resting on a closed book.

== See also ==
- Pope Leo XIV bibliography
- Cardinals created by Francis
- List of popes by length of reign
- List of popes by country
- Saving Grace, a 1986 film starring a fictional pope named Leo XIV

== Notes ==
Catholic Church titles
Preceded by Agostino Trapè	Prior General of the Order of Saint Augustine; September 14, 2001 – September 4, 2013	Succeeded by Alejandro Moral Antón
Preceded by Ernst Gutting	— TITULAR — Bishop of Sufar; December 12, 2014 – September 26, 2015	Succeeded by Robert P. Reed
Preceded by Jesús Moliné Labarte	Bishop of Chiclayo; September 26, 2015 – January 30, 2023	Succeeded by Edinson Edgardo Farfán Córdova
Preceded by Marc Ouellet	Prefect of the Dicastery for Bishops; January 30, 2023 – May 8, 2025	Succeeded by Filippo Iannone
Preceded by Marc Ouellet	President of the Pontifical Commission for Latin America; January 30, 2023 – May 8, 2025	Succeeded by Filippo Iannone
New title	Cardinal Deacon of Santa Monica degli Agostiniani; September 30, 2023 – February 6, 2025	Vacant
Preceded by Angelo Sodano	Cardinal Bishop of Albano; February 6, 2025 – May 8, 2025	Succeeded by Luis Antonio Tagle
Preceded by Francis	Pope; May 8, 2025 – present	Incumbent
