= Alejandro Moral Antón =

Spanish priest (born 1955)

The Reverend Alejandro Moral Antón
- Prior General of the Order of Saint Augustine
- Church: Catholic Church
- Archdiocese: Diocese of Rome
- Appointed: September 4, 2013
- Predecessor: Robert Francis Prevost

Orders
- Ordination: June 20, 1981

Personal details
- Born: Alejandro Moral Antón; June 1, 1955 (age 71) La Vid y Barrios, Spain
- Denomination: Roman Catholic
- Residence: Rome, Italy
- Profession: Augustinian priest

Alejandro Moral Antón O.S.A. (born June 1, 1955) is a Spanish priest of the Roman Catholic Church and the former Prior General of the Order of Saint Augustine, a position he held from 2013 to 2025.

== Biography ==
Moral was born on June 1, 1955, in La Vid y Barrios. He attended high school at the Seminary College of Saint Augustine in Palencia and, in 1972, entered the Augustinian novitiate of the Monastery of Santa Maria de La Vid, taking his simple vows on September 12, 1973.

Moral studied philosophy at the same Monastery of Santa Maria de La Vid, and theology at the Augustinian Major Seminary of Tagaste (Los Negrales). In 1978, he was sent to the International College of Santa Monica in Rome, where he completed his theology degree. He made his solemn profession in the Order of Saint Augustine on September 7, 1980. He was ordained a deacon on January 4, 1981, and on June 20 of the same year, he received his priestly ordination in the chapel of the Colegio San Agustín in Madrid.

Moral holds a degree in Sacred Scripture from the Pontifical Biblical Institute in Rome and in Dogmatic Theology from the Pontifical Gregorian University. In 1983, he was assigned to the community of the Tagaste Major Seminary, where he was a professor, director of studies, formator, and bursar. Between 1989 and 1991, he served as coordinator of the Formation Team of the Tagaste Augustinian Major Seminary, and from 1991 to 1995, he was provincial councilor in charge of formation and religious life. In January 1995, he was elected prior provincial of the Augustinian Province of Spain, and was re-elected for a second term in 1999.

At the general chapter held in Rome in 2001, Moral was elected to the post of vicar general of the Order. In 2004, he became procurator general and, in 2007, assistant general. On 4 September 2013, he was elected prior general for a six-year term. He succeeded Robert Francis Prevost, the future Pope Leo XIV. On 9 September 2019, he was re-elected for another six-year term. Antón left office in September 2025.
