= Pope Leo XIV's childhood home =

House in Dolton, Illinois, US

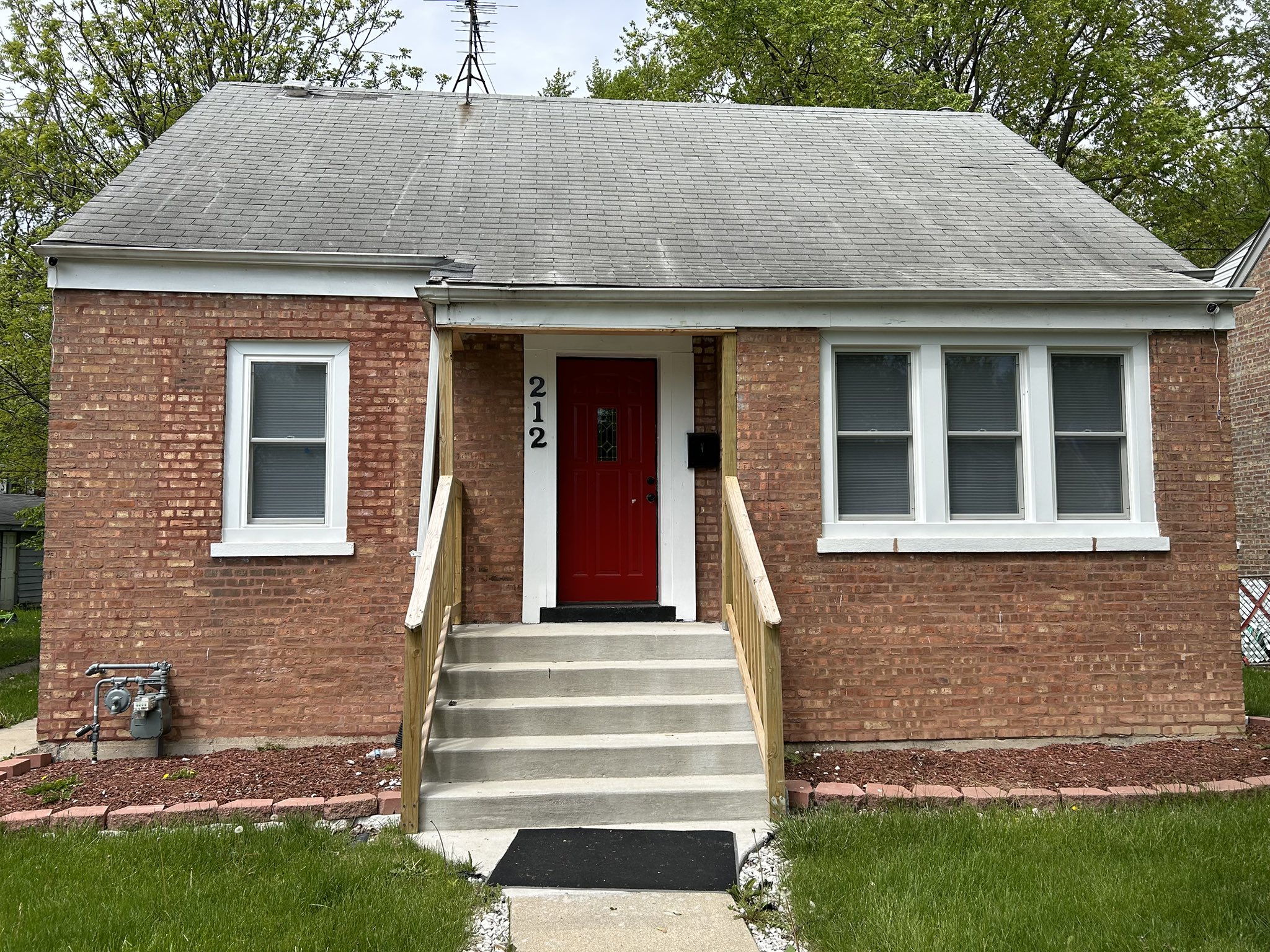
- The house in 2025

General information
- Type: Private residence
- Location: 212 East 141st Place; Dolton, Illinois, U.S.
- Coordinates: 41.6384°N 87.6165°W
- Completed: 1949
- Owner: Prevost family (1949–1996); Village of Dolton (2025–present)

The childhood home of Pope Leo XIV (born Robert Prevost) is a single-family detached brick house located at 212 East 141st Place in Dolton, Illinois, United States. After the 2025 conclave, the house was sold to the village of Dolton to be preserved as a historic site and tourist attraction.

== History ==
=== Prevost family ===
The three-bedroom, two-bathroom house was owned by his parents, Louis and Mildred Prevost, from 1949 until the 1990s. The couple purchased the newly built house with a monthly mortgage payment of $42. They raised their three children there: Louis, John, and Robert (later Pope Leo XIV).

During his youth, Robert Prevost reportedly played pretend as a Catholic priest, using the family's ironing board as an altar. The Prevost family were members of Saint Mary of the Assumption Church in the nearby Chicago neighborhood of Riverdale. Born in 1955, Robert lived in the house full-time until 1969, when he began attending St. Augustine Seminary High School in Laketown Township, Michigan.

The Prevost family sold the home in 1996. It changed ownership several times in subsequent years.

=== Historic site ===
The house was purchased in 2024 as a flip property and listed for sale at approximately $200,000 in early 2025. After the 2025 conclave, in which Prevost was elected as Pope Leo, the listing was withdrawn. In May 2025, the house was placed up for auction with bidding starting at $250,000.

The village government of Dolton announced plans to acquire the house and collaborate with the Archdiocese of Chicago to preserve it as a historic site open to the public. According to a letter from the village attorney to the property's owner, the municipality expressed intent to purchase the house, including the option of acquisition through eminent domain if necessary. Local news reports indicated general community support for the initiative, though some residents raised concerns about the village's debt, infrastructure conditions, and the potential economic benefits of the project. In July 2025, the Dolton Village Board of Trustees voted unanimously to make an offer on the property and completed its purchase later that month for $375,000. In December 2025, the house was designated as a historic landmark by the village of Dolton.

In May 2026, the village of Dolton began offering early private tours to journalists and religious groups. Alison Key, head of the Historic Preservation Commission working on the home, said that the Commission hopes to restore and refurbish the home to appear as it did in the 1950s. Also on display in the home are items owned by or associated with Leo XIV. On the Pope's 70th birthday, a celebration was held outside of the home, which the village hopes to make an annual tradition. Two wooden benches designed and painted by students at Thornton Township High School were donated to the village of Dolton and placed inside the home.
