= Giuseppe Momo =

Italian architect and engineer

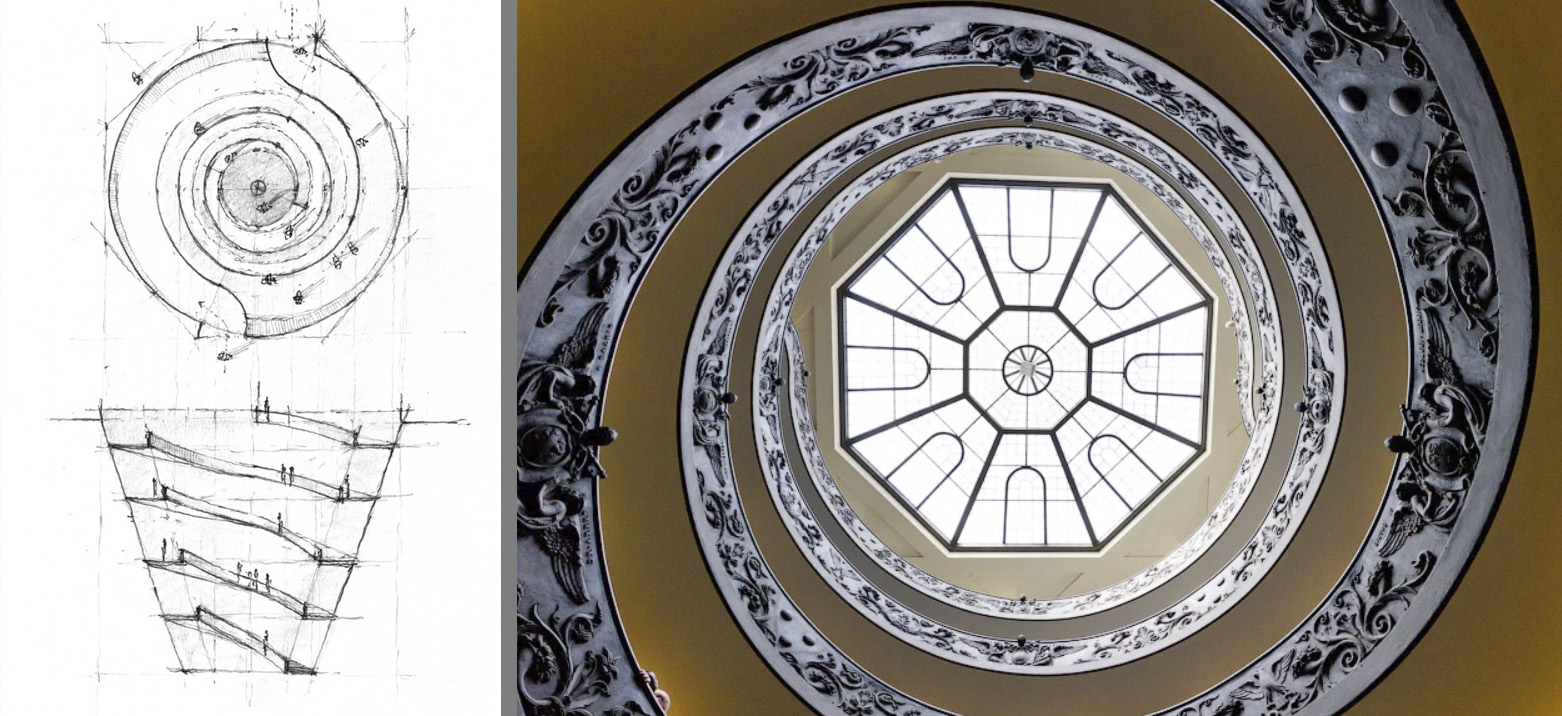
Staircase at the Vatican Museums designed by Giuseppe Momo in 1932

Giuseppe Momo (1875–1940) was an Italian architect and engineer, perhaps best known for the Scala Momo in the Vatican Museums cast by Ferdinando Marinelli Artistic Foundry of Florence and the Pontifical Ethiopian College.
