= Apostolic Vicariate of Jaén in Peru =

Catholic missionary jurisdiction in Peru

Apostolic Vicariate of Jaén en Peru o San Francisco Javier Vicariatus Apostolicus Giennensis in Peruvia

Location
- Country: Peru
- Metropolitan: Immediately exempt to the Holy See
- Coordinates: 5°42′S 78°48′W

Statistics
- Area: 32,572 km^{2} (12,576 sq mi)

Information
- Denomination: Catholic Church
- Sui iuris church: Latin Church
- Rite: Roman Rite

Current leadership
- Bishop: Juan Carlos Morante Buchhammer

The Apostolic Vicariate of Jaén en Peru or Vicariate Apostolic of San Francisco Javier (Latin: Vicariatus Apostolicus Giennensis in Peruvia) is a Latin Church apostolic vicariate of the Catholic Church in Peru . Its cathedral is located in the episcopal see of Jaén, in Peru's Cajamarca province. It remains immediately exempt subject to the Holy See and not part of an ecclesiastical province.

== History ==
- January 11, 1946: Established as Apostolic Prefecture of San Francisco Javier from the Diocese of Cajamarca, Diocese of Chachapoyas and Apostolic Vicariate of San Gabriel de la Dolorosa del Marañón
- April 24, 1971: Promoted as Apostolic Vicariate of San Francisco Javier
- November 22, 1980: Renamed as Apostolic Vicariate of Jaén en Perú

== Bishops ==
=== Incumbent ordinaries, in reverse chronological order ===
Mostly Jesuits (denoted by the S.J. post-nominal)
Vicar Apostolics of Jaén en Perú

- Bishop Juan Carlos Morante Buchhammer S.J. (July 9, 2026 – )
- Bishop Gilberto Alfredo Vizcarra Mori, S.J. (June 11, 2014 – February 11, 2025)
- Bishop Santiago María García de la Rasilla, S.J. (November 11, 2005 – June 11, 2014)
- Archbishop Pedro Ricardo Barreto Jimeno, S.J. (Apostolic Administrator July 17, 2004 – November 11, 2005)
- Bishop Pedro Ricardo Barreto Jimeno, S.J. (later Archbishop) (November 21, 2001 – July 17, 2004), appointed Archbishop of Huancayo
- Bishop José María Izuzquiza Herranz, S.J. (March 30, 1987 – November 21, 2001)
- Bishop Augusto Vargas Alzamora, S.J. (June 8, 1978 – August 23, 1985); future Cardinal

Vicars Apostolic of San Francisco Javier

- Bishop Antonio de Hornedo Correa, S.J. (April 24, 1971 – July 9, 1977), appointed Bishop of Chachapoyas

Prefects Apostolic of San Francisco Javier

- Fr. Antonio de Hornedo Correa, S.J. (later Bishop) (August 6, 1963 – April 24, 1971)
- Fr. Juan Albacete, S.J. (November 7, 1961 – December 4, 1962)
- Fr. José Oleaga Guerequiz, S.J. (October 23, 1959 – 1961)
- Fr. Ignacio García Martin, S.J. (July 11, 1946 - 1958)

=== Other priest of this vicariate who became bishop ===
- Ángel Francisco Simón Piorno, appointed Bishop of Chachapoyas in 1991
