= Territorial Prelature of Moyobamba =

Roman Catholic territorial prelature in Peru

Territorial Prelature of Moyobamba Praelatura Territorialis Moyobambensis

Catholic

Location
- Country: Peru
- Metropolitan: Trujillo

Statistics
- Area: 45,775 km^{2} (17,674 sq mi)
- Population: Total; Catholics: (as of 2004); 692,232; 553,785 (80.0%)

Information
- Rite: Latin Rite

Current leadership
- Bishop: Rafael Alfonso Escudero López-Brea
- Metropolitan Archbishop: Gilberto Alfredo Vizcarra Mori SJ

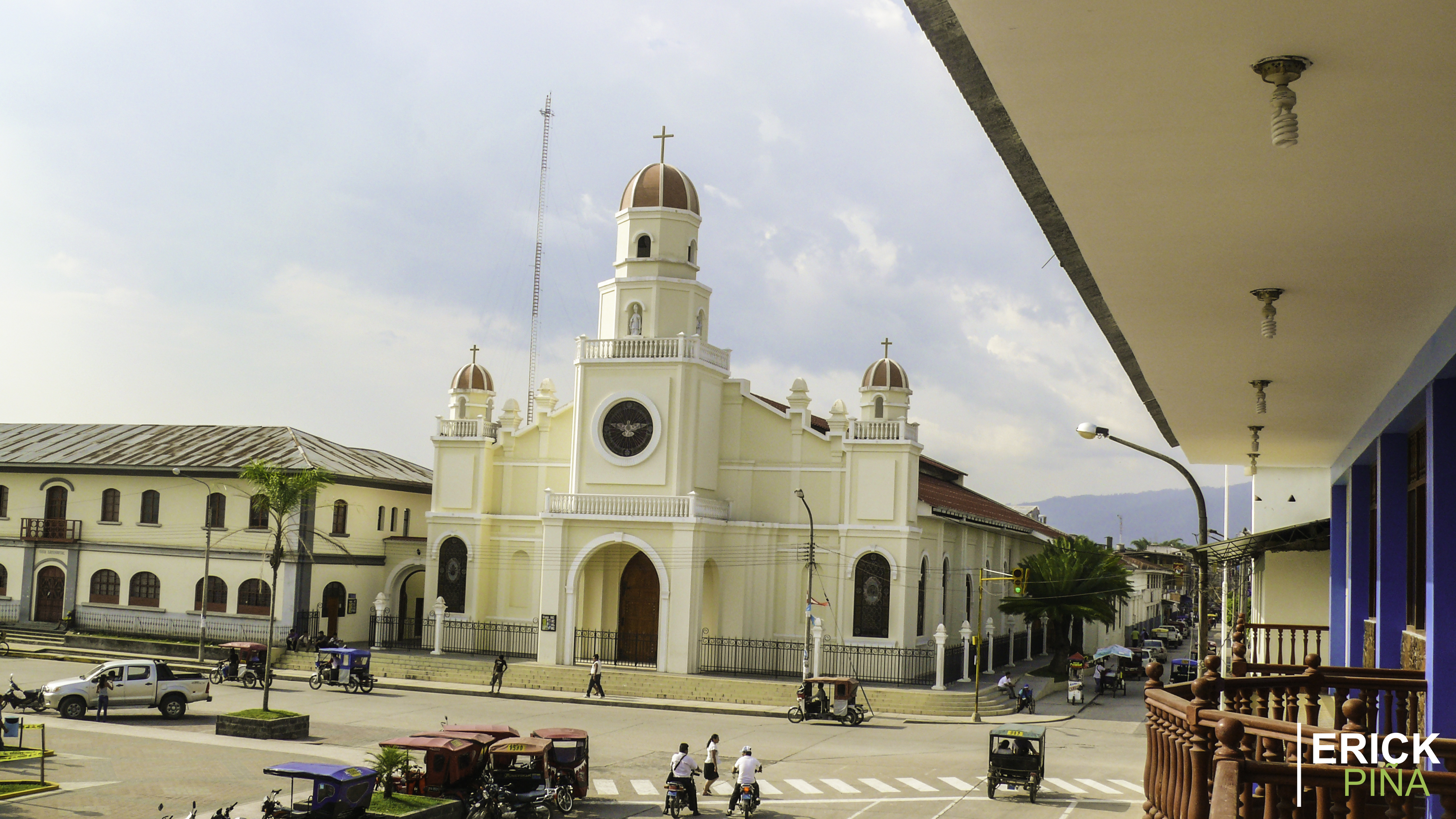

The Territorial Prelature of Moyobamba (Latin: Praelatura Territorialis Moyobambensis) is a Roman Catholic territorial prelature located in the city of Moyobamba in the ecclesiastical province of Trujillo in Peru.

== History ==
- March 7, 1948: Established as Territorial Prelature of Moyobamba from the Diocese of Chachapoyas

== Bishops ==
- Prelates of Moyobamba (Roman rite), in reverse chronological order
  - Bishop Rafael Alfonso Escudero López-Brea (July 21, 2007 – Present)
  - Bishop José Ramón Santos Iztueta Mendizábal, C.P. (June 6, 2000 – July 21, 2007)
  - Bishop Venancio Celestino Orbe Uriarte, C.P. (August 25, 1967 – June 6, 2000)
  - Bishop Martin Fulgencio Elorza Legaristi, C.P. (January 15, 1949 – December 30, 1966)

=== Coadjutor prelates ===
- José Ramón Santos Iztueta Mendizábal, C.P. (1998-2000)
- Rafael Alfonso Escudero López-Brea (2006-2007)
