= Juan Carlos Morante Buchhammer =

Peruvian Roman Catholic bishop (born 1958)

The Most Reverend Juan Carlos Morante Buchhammer S.J.
- Apostolic Vicar of Jaén
- Church: Catholic Church
- Appointed: 9 July 2026
- Installed: 30 August 2026
- Predecessor: Gilberto Alfredo Vizcarra Mori
- Previous post: Provincial Superior of the Society of Jesus in Peru (2014–2019)

Orders
- Ordination: 31 July 1992
- Consecration: 30 August 2026 by Pedro Ricardo Barreto Jimeno

Personal details
- Born: 25 January 1958 (age 68) Piura, Peru
- Occupation: Priest, professor, academic administrator
- Education: National University of Engineering; Pontifical Catholic University of Peru; Santa Clara University; Comillas Pontifical University

Juan Carlos Morante Buchhammer, S.J. (born 25 January 1958) is a Peruvian Roman Catholic prelate who has served as Apostolic Vicar of Jaén since 2026. He previously served as Provincial Superior of the Society of Jesus in Peru from 2014 to 2019 and held several academic and pastoral positions in Peru.

== Early life and education ==
Morante Buchhammer was born on 25 January 1958 in Piura, Peru. He was educated by the Salesians and entered the Society of Jesus in 1981.

He obtained a degree in industrial engineering from the National University of Engineering in Lima, a licentiate in philosophy from the Pontifical Catholic University of Peru, and a licentiate in theology from the Jesuit School of Theology in Santa Clara University. He received a doctorate in philosophy from the Comillas Pontifical University in Madrid in 1999.

He was ordained to the priesthood on 31 July 1992 and made his solemn profession in the Society of Jesus on 30 May 2000 in Lima.

== Jesuit ministry ==
From 1999 to 2008, Morante Buchhammer was a professor of philosophy at the Escuela Superior de Pedagogía, Filosofía y Letras at the Antonio Ruiz de Montoya University and executive director of its Instituto de Filosofía, Sociología y Política. He was also a member of the Equipo Jesuita Latinoamericano de Reflexión Filosófica from 2001 to 2011.

He served as councillor of the Peruvian Jesuit Province from 2001 to 2003 and as a consultor from 2004 to 2014. From 2004 to 2011, he was superior of the Virgen de Nazaret Jesuit community in El Agustino, Lima. He was subsequently a professor at the Antonio Ruiz de Montoya University, dean of its Faculty of Philosophy, and rector from 2011 to 2014.

From 2012 to 2014 he was superior of the San Francisco de Borja Jesuit community in Lima. In September 2014, he became Provincial Superior of the Society of Jesus in Peru.

During his tenure as provincial, he represented the Peruvian Jesuit Province in cooperation with Jesuit communities and institutions in the United States. In 2015, he visited Jesuit partners in the Chicago-Detroit and Wisconsin provinces and discussed Jesuit ministries in Peru and the relationship between Peruvian and Midwest Jesuits.

Morante Buchhammer remained Provincial Superior until 2019. From 2020 to 2024, he was professor and head of the academic unit of the Escuela Superior de Pedagogía Víctor Andrés Belaunde in Jaén. From 2025 until his episcopal appointment, he was superior of the San Ignacio de Loyola Jesuit community in Piura and coordinator of the territorial platforms of Piura and Chiclayo.

== Episcopacy ==
On 9 July 2026, Pope Leo XIV appointed Morante Buchhammer Apostolic Vicar of the Apostolic Vicariate of Jaén in Peru. At the time of his appointment, he was superior of the San Ignacio de Loyola Jesuit community in Piura.

He was consecrated a bishop on 30 August 2026 at the Institución Educativa San Luis Gonzaga in Jaén. Pedro Ricardo Barreto Jimeno, S.J., Archbishop Emeritus of Huancayo, was the principal consecrator, while Paolo Rocco Gualtieri and Gilberto Alfredo Vizcarra Mori, S.J., served as principal co-consecrators.
