= Diocese of Huarí =

Diocese of the Catholic Church in Peru

Coordinates: 9.3475°S 77.1712°W

Diocese of Huarí Dioecesis Huariensis

Catholic

Location
- Country: Peru
- Ecclesiastical province: Trujillo

Statistics
- Area: 23,000 km^{2} (8,900 sq mi)
- Population: Total; Catholics: (as of 2004); 306,000; 296,500 (96.9%)
- Parishes: 20

Information
- Denomination: Catholic Church
- Sui iuris church: Latin Church
- Rite: Roman Rite
- Established: 15 May 1958 (68 years ago)

Current leadership
- Pope: Leo XIV
- Bishop: Vacant
- Metropolitan Archbishop: Gilberto Alfredo Vizcarra Mori SJ
- Auxiliary Bishops: Giorgio Barbetta
- Apostolic Administrator: Giorgio Barbetta

The Diocese of Huarí (Latin: Dioecesis Huariensis) is a Latin Church ecclesiastical territory or diocese of the Catholic Church in Peru. Erected as a Territorial Prelature in 1958, elevation to a full diocese occurred in April 2008. It is a suffragan diocese in the ecclesiastical province of the metropolitan Archdiocese of Trujillo.

== History ==
On 15 May 1958 Pope Pius XII established the Territorial Prelature of Huarí with territory taken from the Huánuco and the Diocese of Huaraz. It was elevated to a diocese by Pope Benedict XVI on 2 April 2008.

== Bishops ==
=== Ordinaries ===
- Marco Libardoni, O.S.I. † (15 May 1958 – 25 Oct 1966)
- Dante Frasnelli Tarter, O.S.I. † (3 Aug 1967 – 13 Jun 2001)
- Antonio Santarsiero Rosa, O.S.I. (13 Jun 2001 – 4 Feb 2004) Appointed, Bishop of Huacho
- Ivo Baldi Gaburri † (4 Feb 2004 – 11 Jun 2021)
  - Apostolic Administrator Giorgio Barbetta (14 June 2021 – Present)

=== Auxiliary bishop ===
- Giorgio Barbetta (2019-)
