= José Eduardo Velásquez Tarazona =

Peruvian Roman Catholic prelate (1947–2026)

- Bishop Emeritus of Huaraz
- Archdiocese: Trujillo
- Diocese: Huaraz
- Appointed: 4 February 2004
- Term ended: 17 September 2024
- Predecessor: Ivo Baldi Gaburri
- Successor: José Antonio Alarcón
- Previous posts: Auxiliary Bishop of Huaraz (1994–2004); Titular Bishop of Obba (1994–2000); Coadjutor Bishop of Tacna and Moquegua (2000–2004)

Orders
- Ordination: 1 July 1973
- Consecration: 14 May 1994 by José Ramón Gurruchaga Ezama

Personal details
- Born: 2 September 1947 Caraz, Huaylas province, Peru
- Died: 12 January 2026 (aged 78) Lima, Peru
- Motto: Omnibus omnia factus sum

José Eduardo Velásquez Tarazona (2 September 1947 – 12 January 2026) was a Peruvian Roman Catholic prelate. He served as the bishop of the Roman Catholic Diocese of Huaraz from 2004 to 2024.

Velásquez Tarazona died on 12 January 2026, at the age of 78.

Catholic Church titles
Preceded by Ivo Baldi Gaburri	Bishop of Huarez; 2004–2024	Succeeded by José Antonio Alarcón
Preceded by —	Coadjutor Bishop of Tacna and Moquegua; 2000–2004	Succeeded by —
Preceded by George Patrick Ziemann	Titular Bishop of Obba; 1994–2000	Succeeded by Gustavo Rodriguez Vega
Preceded by —	Auxiliary Bishop of Huaraz; 1994–2004	Succeeded by —
