= Territorial Prelature of Huamachuco =

Roman Catholic territorial prelature in Peru

Territorial Prelature of Huamachuco Praelatura Territorialis Huamaciucanus

Catholic
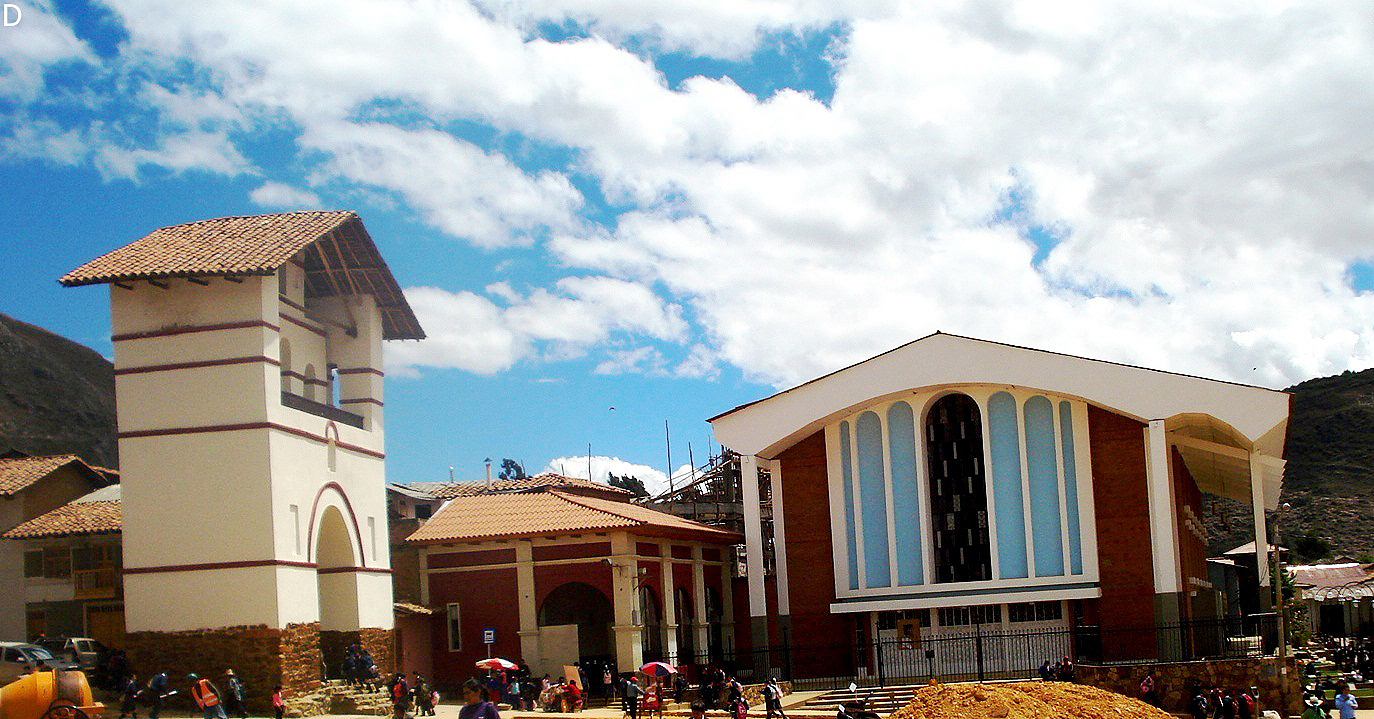

Location
- Country: Peru
- Metropolitan: Trujillo

Statistics
- Area: 7,918 km^{2} (3,057 sq mi)
- Population: Total; Catholics: (as of 2004); 230,000; 149,500 (65.0%)

Information
- Rite: Latin Rite

Current leadership
- Bishop: Pascual Rivera Montoya T.O.R.
- Metropolitan Archbishop: Gilberto Alfredo Vizcarra Mori SJ
- Bishops emeritus: Sebastián Ramis Torrens, T.O.R.

The Territorial Prelature of Huamachuco (Latin: Praelatura Territorialis Huamaciucanus) is a Roman Catholic territorial prelature located in the city of Huamachuco in the ecclesiastical province of Trujillo in Peru.

== History ==
- On December 4, 1961, the Territorial Prelature of Huamachuco was established from the Metropolitan Archdiocese of Trujillo

== Leadership ==
- Prelates of Huamachuco (Roman rite), in reverse chronological order
  - Bishop Pascual Benjamín Rivera Montoya, T.O.R. (2021.03.30 – ...)
  - Bishop Sebastián Ramis Torrens, T.O.R. (1990.11.13 – 2018.08.07)
  - Bishop Damián Nicolau Roig, T.O.R. (1963.10.23 – 1981.09.13)
