= Thenae =

Carthaginian and Roman town in present-day Tunisia

Thenae Thaena or Thaenae
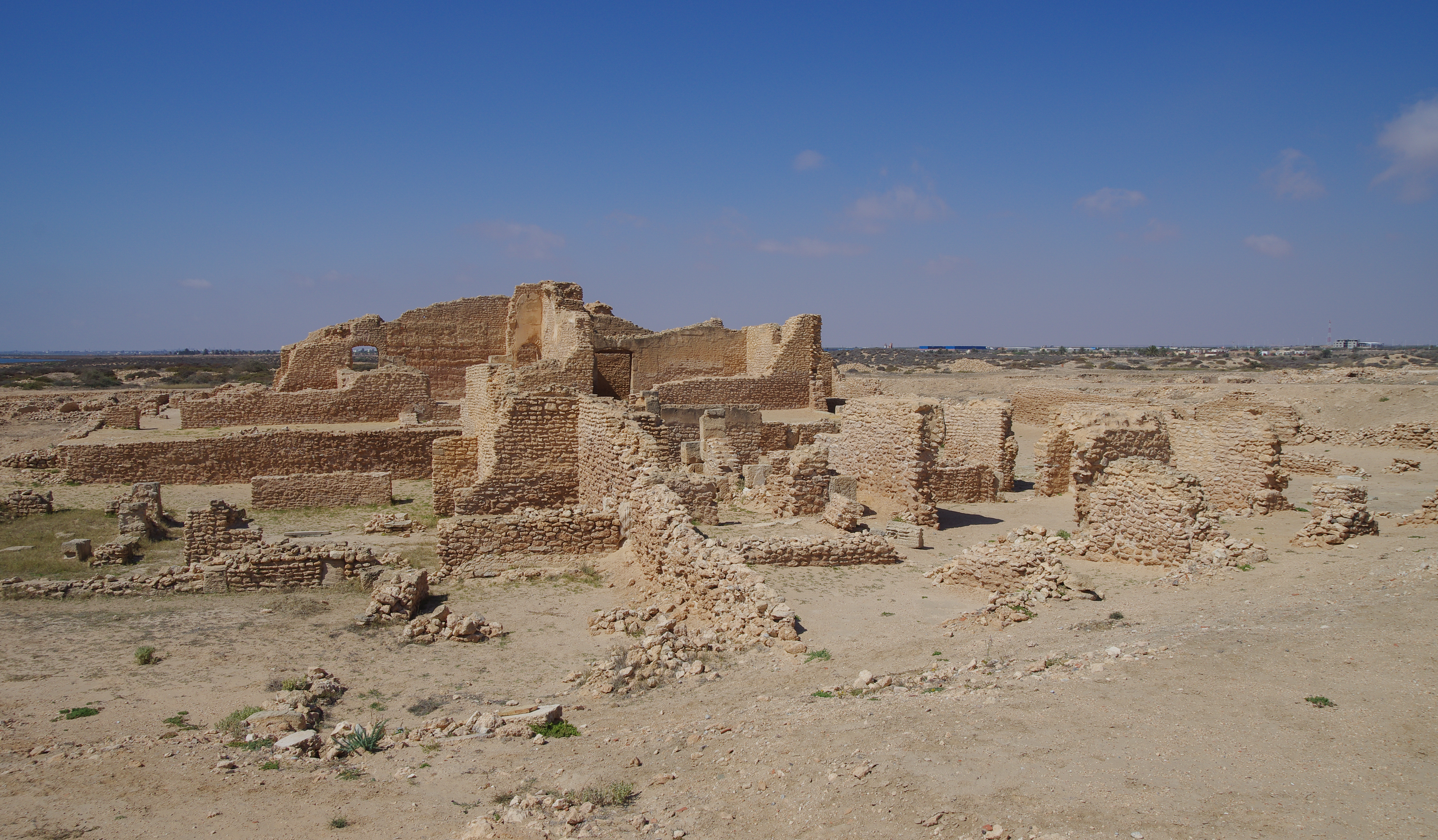
- Ruins of the Roman thermae of Thaenae

- Location within Tunisia
- 34°41′14.4″N 10°43′13.8″E
- Type: Settlement
- Location: Sfax Governorate, Tunisia

Thenae or Thenai (Ancient Greek: Θεναί), also written Thaena and Thaenae, was a Carthaginian and Roman town (civitas) located in or near Thyna, now a suburb of Sfax on the Mediterranean coast of southeastern Tunisia.

== Name ==
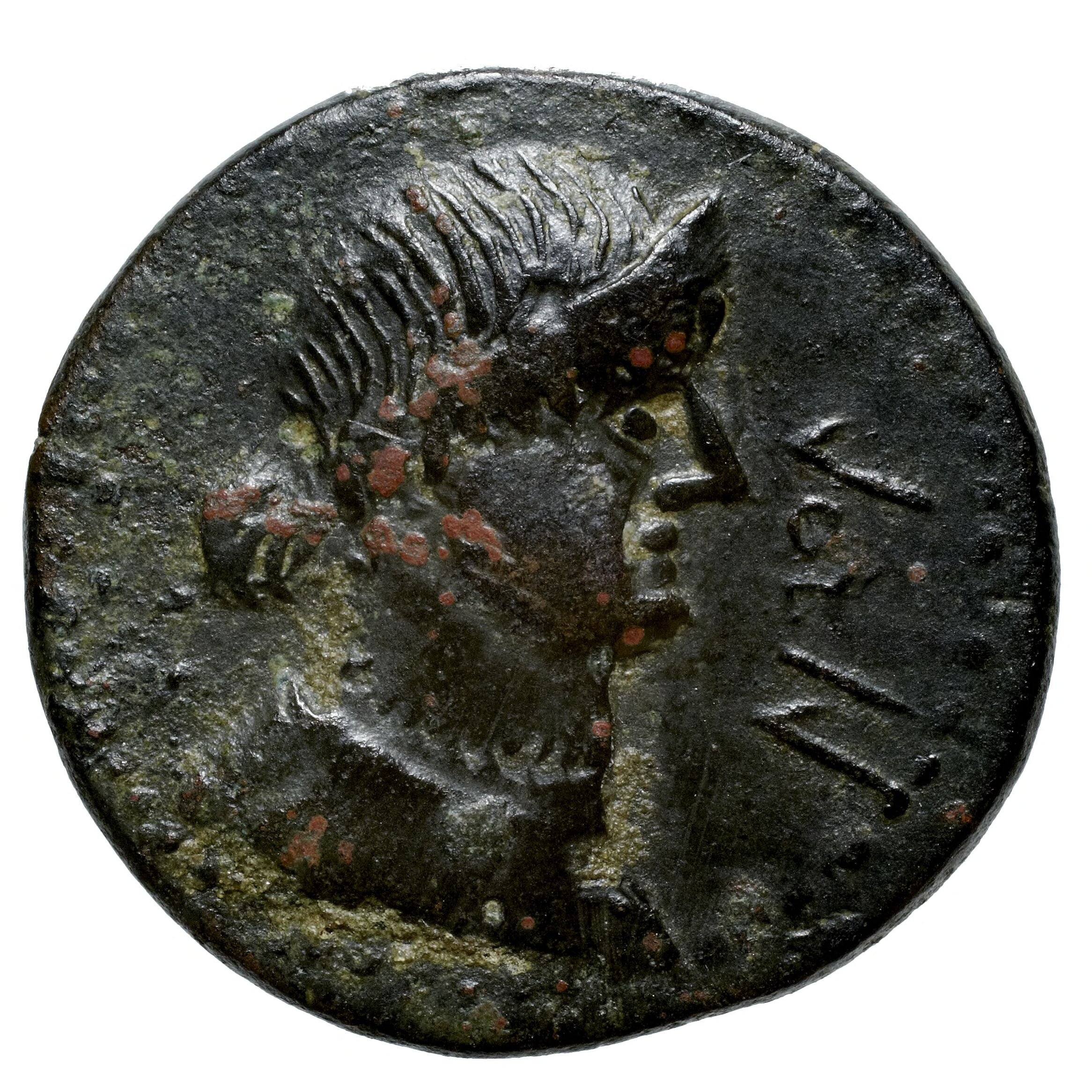
A coin of Thaena with the Punic legend 𐤕𐤏𐤉𐤍𐤕

The city was founded with the Punic name tʿynt (Punic: 𐤕𐤏𐤉𐤍𐤕), similar to Semitic transcriptions of Tayinat in Turkey. Barclay V. Head also transcribes it as Thainath. The Punic name was transcribed into Greek as Thaína (Θαίνα) and Thenae (Θεναί), and into Latin variously as Thenae, Thaena, and Thaenae. Strabo called the town Thena (ἡ Θένα) and Ptolemy called it both Thaina (Θαίνα) and Theaenae (Θέαιναι). At a later period it became a Roman colony with the name of Aelia Augusta Mercurialis.

== History ==
Thenae was founded as a Phoenician colony on the Mediterranean coast of what is now southeastern Tunisia. Along with the rest of ancient Tunisia, it passed into Carthaginian and then Roman control during the time of the Punic Wars.

Thenae issued its own bronze coins around the time of Julius Caesar and Augustus, with a female head (either Serapis or Astarte) obverse and a four-columned temple reverse. It also bore the town's name in Punic characters.

In the surviving ruins, there are a bath house, a wealthy house (domus), city walls, lower-class housing, and an early Christian basilica.

== Bishopric ==
Thenae was the seat of a Christian bishopric during late antiquity. According to a life of St Fulgentius, a council was held at Thenae (Latin: Thenitanum Concilium). There are six documented bishops of the ancient diocese:

- Eucrazio, who assisted the 256 council in Carthage called by St Cyprian to discuss the question concerning the lapsii;
- Latonio (Catholic) and Securo (Donatist), competing bishops who appeared at the 411 council in Carthage;
- Pascasio, who took part in the 484 synod in Carthage convened by the Vandal king Huneric and was afterwards exiled;
- Pontian, who intervened in the 525 council in Carthage; and
- Felix, who attended the antimonotelite council of 646.

Today, Thenae survives as a titular see of the Roman Catholic Church. Modern bishops have been:

- Thomas Franz Xaver Spreiter (1906–1944)
- Louis Francis Kelleher (1945–1946)
- Thomas Joseph McDonough (1947–1960)
- Paolo Ghizzoni (1961–1972)
- Andrzej Maria Deskur (1974–1985)
- Marian Duś (1985–current), former auxiliary bishop of Warsaw

== See also ==
- Autenti and Taparura, nearby Roman settlements
