= Edinson Edgardo Farfán Córdova =

Peruvian Catholic bishop (born 1974)

The Most Reverend Edinson Edgardo Farfán Córdova OSA
- Bishop of Chiclayo
- Church: Catholic Church
- Archdiocese: Piura
- Diocese: Chiclayo
- Appointed: February 14, 2024
- Installed: March 16, 2024
- Predecessor: Robert Francis Prevost (now Pope Leo XIV)

Orders
- Ordination: July 26, 2008 by Daniel Thomas Turley Murphy
- Consecration: January 4, 2020 by Héctor Miguel Cabrejos Vidarte

Personal details
- Born: September 21, 1974 (age 52) Tambogrande, Piura province, Peru
- Denomination: Roman Catholic
- Education: Bolivian Catholic University San Pablo
- Motto: Servir con Gratitud y Comunión "Serve with Gratitude and Communion"
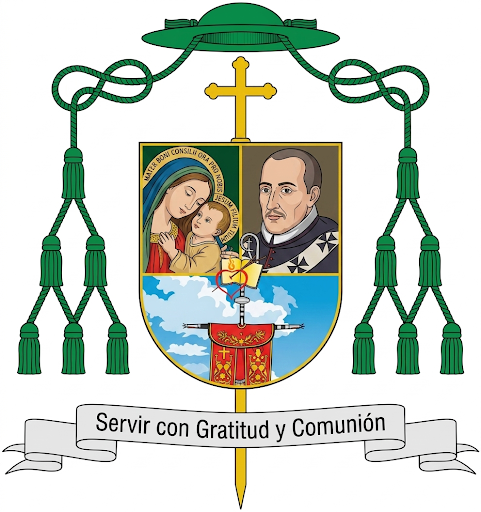
- Coat of arms: Edinson Edgardo Farfán Córdova's coat of arms

Edinson Edgardo Farfán Córdova (born September 21, 1974) is a Peruvian Catholic prelate who has served as Bishop of Chiclayo since 2024, succeeding Robert Francis Prevost (who was elected Pope Leo XIV a year later). A member of the Order of Saint Augustine (OSA), he served simultaneously as parish priest, academic teacher, and administrator of the Order in several locations throughout Bolivia and Peru.

== Biography ==
=== Early life and education ===
Farfán Córdova was born in Tambogrande in the Piura province of northern Peru on September 21, 1974. He entered the Augustine Order (OSA) in 1998, as a novice in Lima. He studied philosophy at the seminary of the Archdiocese of Trujillo from 1999 to 2001, and made his perpetual profession on January 11, 2003. After studying further for a degree in theology at the Bolivian Catholic University San Pablo in Cochabamba, with a focus on a theology of spiritual life and pedagogy, he graduated in 2006.

=== Priesthood and pedagogy ===
He was ordained as a priest on July 26, 2008.

Farfán Córdova coordinated for the International Commission of Communications and Publications of the Organization of Augustinian Recollects of Latin America from 2006 to 2014, simultaneously vicar of Santa Ana di Cala Cala in the archdiocese of Cochabamba, Bolivia, from 2007 and 2008, then vicar of San José Obrero in the diocese of Chulucanas, Peru, where he also taught as professor of theology and served as spiritual rector at the seminary from 2009 to 2010. He was master of pre-novices of the Augustinian Order from 2011 to 2012.

He moved to the Archdiocese of Trujillo in 2012, where he was parish priest at Nuestra Señora de Montserrat in from 2012 to 2013, teaching at the Catholic University of Trujillo from Catholic University Benedict XVI from 2013 to 2015, and serving as prior of the Augustinian Order of Peru from 2013 to 2017. He was parish priest Santa Rita de Casia in Trujillo from 2015 to 2018, served as episcopal vicar for consecrated life in Trujillo from 2017 to 2018, and as secretary general of the Organization of Augustinian Recollects of Latin America from 2015 to 2019.

=== Prelacy ===
Pope Francis appointed him apostolic administrator of Chuquibambilla on April 24, 2018, and subsequently prelate of Chuquibambilla on December 7, 2019. Héctor Miguel Cabrejos Vidarte, the Archbishop of Trujillo and member of the Order of Friars Minor, consecrated him bishop on January 4, 2020. The co-consecrators were the Apostolic Nuncio to Peru, Bishop Nicola Girasoli, and the Bishop of Chiclayo, Robert Francis Prevost, former prior-general of the Order of Saint Augustine.

Farfán Córdova participated in the XVI Ordinary General Assembly of the Synod of Bishops within the framework of the World Synod.

=== Bishop of Chiclayo ===
On February 14, 2024, Pope Francis appointed Farfán Córdova as Bishop of Chiclayo, succeeding Robert Francis Prevost, whom the pope appointed as prefect of the Dicastery for Bishops. In the 2025 conclave, Prevost was elected as Pope Leo XIV. In a news conference following the 2025 conclave, he described the pope's time riding horseback through mountainous communities in northern Peru as formative. Farfán Córdova described his predecessor as "a shepherd among people, a man with the smell of sheep," endorsing his papacy.
