= Santiago María García de la Rasilla =

Spanish-born Peruvian Roman Catholic bishop (1936–2018)

Santiago María García de la Rasilla Domínguez S.J.
- Vicar Apostolic of Jaén in Peru or San Francisco Javier
- Church: Catholic Church
- See: Apostolic Vicariate of Jaén in Peru or San Francisco Javier
- In office: 11 November 2005 – 11 June 2014
- Predecessor: Pedro Barreto
- Successor: Gilberto Alfredo Vizcarra Mori
- Other post: Titular Bishop of Voncaria (2005-2018)

Orders
- Ordination: 14 July 1967
- Consecration: 13 January 2006 by Oscar Rolando Cantuarias Pastor

Personal details
- Born: 18 October 1936 Madrid, Spanish Republic
- Died: 13 August 2018 (aged 81) Lima, Peru
- Coat of arms: Santiago María García de la Rasilla Domínguez's coat of arms

Santiago María García de la Rasilla Domínguez SJ (18 October 1936 – 13 August 2018) was a Spanish-born Peruvian Roman Catholic bishop. García de la Rasilla Domínguez was born in Spain and was ordained to the priesthood in Spain for the Society of Jesus. He served as titular bishop of Voncaria. From 2006 to 2014, he served as bishop of the Apostolic Vicariate of Jaén in Peru in Peru.
