= Diocese of Huaraz =

Latin Catholic diocese in Peru

Coordinates: 9.5315°S 77.5231°W

Diocese of Huaraz Dioecesis Huarazensis

Catholic
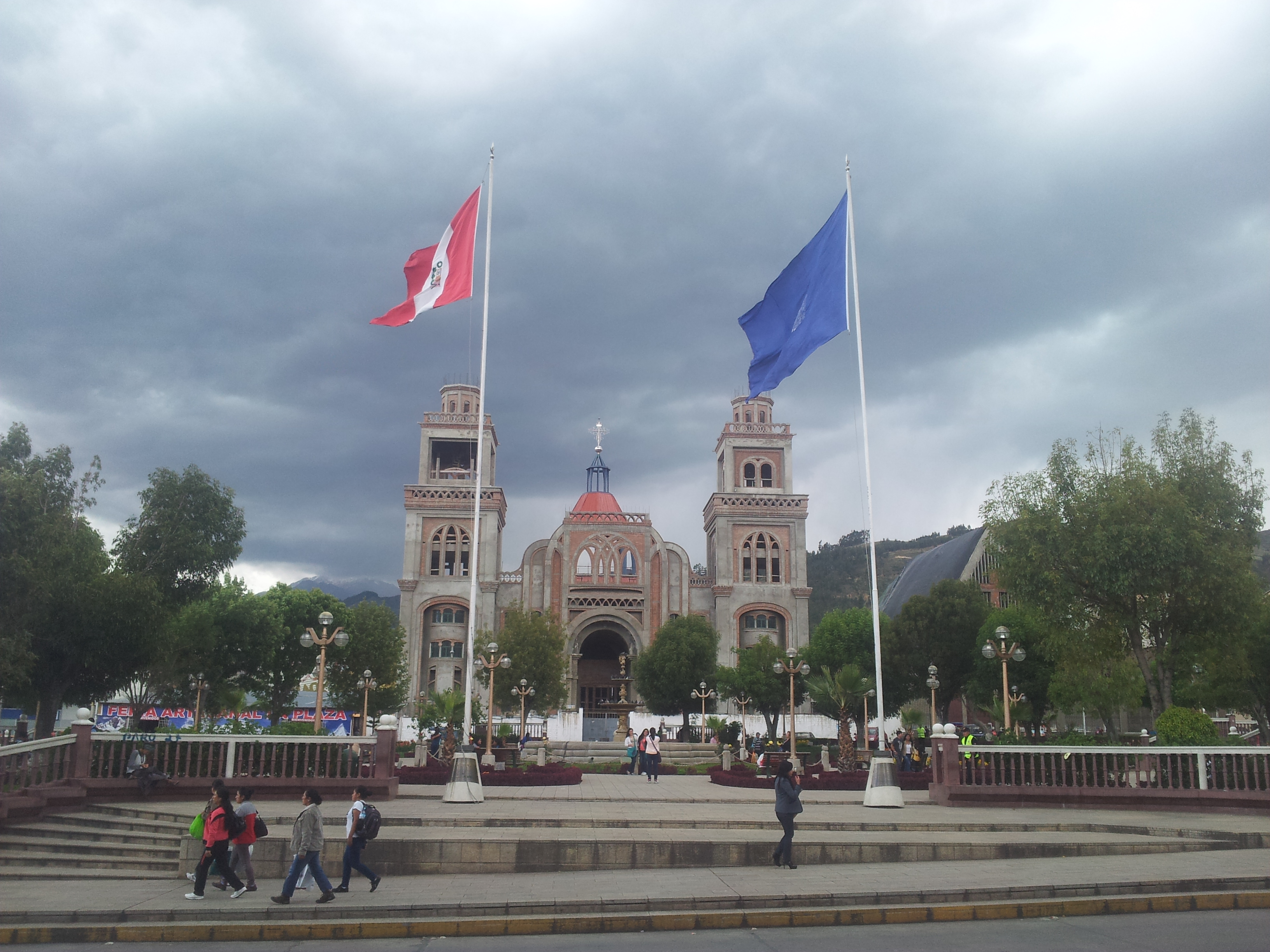
- Cathedral of St. Sebastian and the Immaculate Conception

Location
- Country: Peru
- Ecclesiastical province: Trujillo

Statistics
- Area: 13,818 km^{2} (5,335 sq mi)
- Population: Total; Catholics: (as of 2006); 405,800; 365,000 (89.9%)
- Parishes: 30

Information
- Denomination: Catholic Church
- Rite: Roman Rite
- Established: 15 May 1899 (127 years ago)
- Cathedral: Catedral de San Sebastián y la Inmaculada Concepción

Current leadership
- Pope: Leo XIV
- Bishop: José Antonio Alarcón Gómez, O.F.M.Conv.
- Metropolitan Archbishop: Gilberto Alfredo Vizcarra Mori SJ

The Diocese of Huaraz is a diocese of the Latin Church of the Catholic Church in Peru. Erected in 1899, the diocese is a suffragan of the Archdiocese of Trujillo.

The current bishop is José Antonio Alarcón Gómez, O.F.M.Conv., appointed in September 2024.

== History ==
On 15 May 1899 Pope Leo XIII established the Diocese of Huaraz with territory taken from the Archdiocese of Lima. It lost territory when the Territorial Prelature of Huarí was established in 1958.

== Bishops ==
=== Ordinaries ===
- Ezechiel Francisco Soto, SS.CC. (27 Feb 1901 – 17 Apr 1903)
- Mariano Holguin, O.F.M. (12 August 1904 – 1 June 1906) Appointed, Bishop of Arequipa
- Pedro Pascuál Francesco Farfán de los Godos (6 August 1907 – 19 April 1918) Appointed, Bishop of Cuzco
- Domingo Juan Vargas, O.P. (26 August 1920 – 1 August 1936)
- Mariano Jacinto Valdivia y Ortiz (15 December 1940 – 17 December 1956) Appointed, Bishop of Huancayo
- Teodosio Moreno Quintana (17 December 1956 – 21 September 1971)
- Fernando Vargas Ruiz de Somocurcio, S.J. (21 September 1971 – 18 January 1978) Appointed, Archbishop of Piura
- Emilio Vallebuona Merea, S.D.B. (18 January 1978 – 30 August 1985) Appointed, Archbishop of Huancayo
- José Ramón Gurruchaga Ezama, S.D.B. (3 January 1987 – 14 December 1996) Appointed, Bishop of Lurín
- Ivo Baldi Gaburri (14 December 1999 – 4 February 2004) Appointed, Prelate of Huarí
- José Eduardo Velásquez Tarazona (4 February 2004 – 17 September 2024)
- José Antonio Alarcón Gómez, O.F.M.Conv. (since 17 September 2024)

=== Auxiliary bishops ===
- Luigi Zanzottera, O.S.I. (1969–1970)
- José Eduardo Velásquez Tarazona (1994–2000), appointed Coadjutor Bishop of Tacna y Moquegua (later returned here as Bishop)
