= Diocese of Chiclayo =

Latin Catholic diocese in Peru

Coordinates: 6.7717°S 79.8378°W

Diocese of Chiclayo Dioecesis Chiclayensis Diócesis de Chiclayo

Catholic
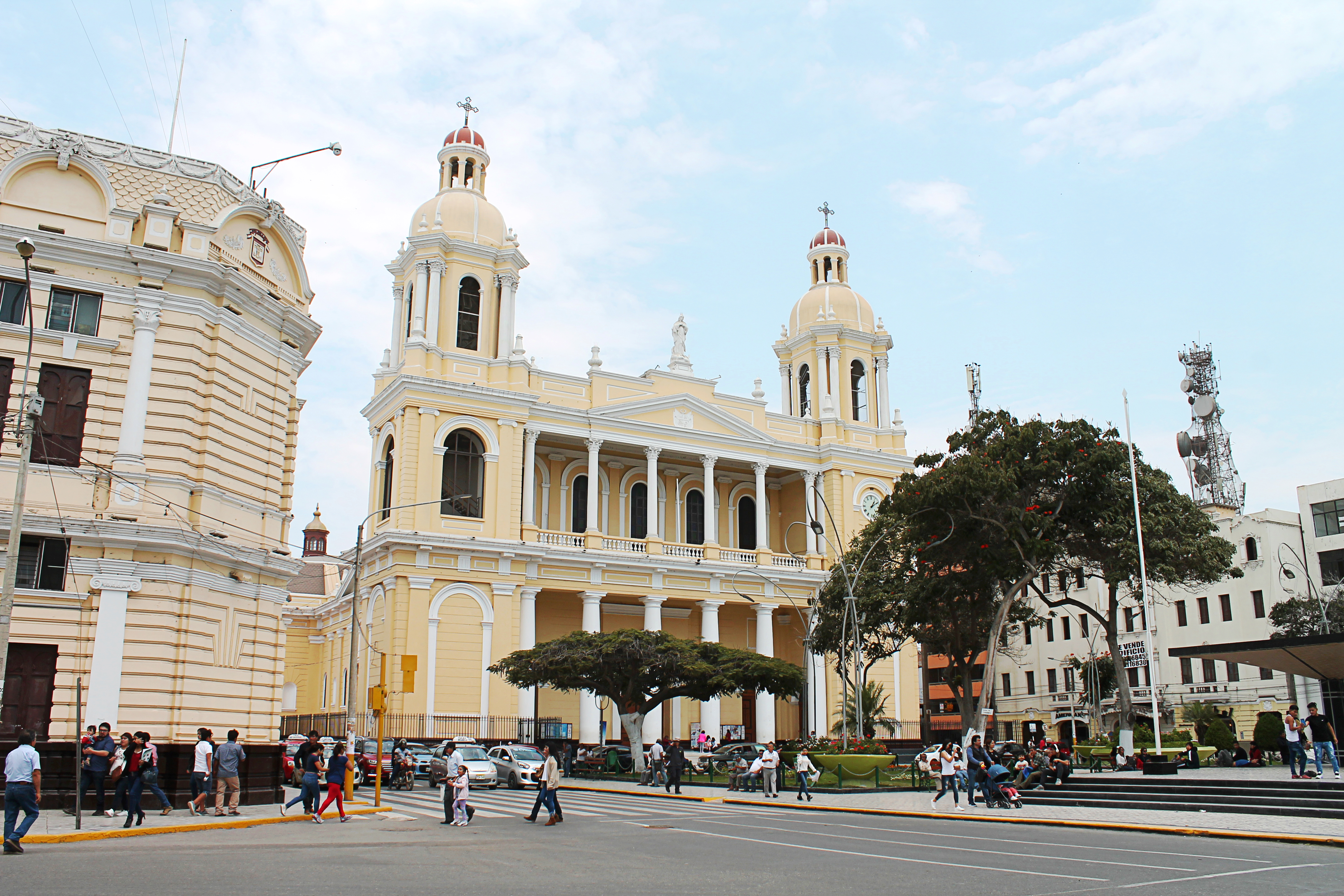
- Cathedral of St. Mary

Location
- Country: Peru
- Metropolitan: Piura

Statistics
- Area: 18,226 km^{2} (7,037 sq mi)
- Population: Total; Catholics: (as of 2006); 1,218,000; 1,115,000 (91.5%)
- Parishes: 48

Information
- Sui iuris church: Latin Church
- Rite: Roman Rite
- Established: 17 December 1956
- Cathedral: Catedral Santa María

Current leadership
- Pope: Leo XIV
- Bishop: Edinson Edgardo Farfán Córdova
- Bishops emeritus: Jesús Moliné Labarte

Map

Website
- diocesischiclayo.org.pe

The Roman Catholic Diocese of Chiclayo (Latin: Dioecesis Chiclayensis; Spanish: Diócesis de Chiclayo) is a Latin Church diocese of the Catholic Church in the ecclesiastical province of Piura in Peru's northwestern Lambayeque region.

Its episcopal see is Cathedral Santa María in the city of Chiclayo. It is also the former diocese of Pope Leo XIV. The current bishop, since 14 February 2024, is Edinson Edgardo Farfán Córdova.

== History ==
The Diocese of Chiclayo was established on 17 December 1956 as the Diocese of Chiclayo, its territory taken from the Diocese of Cajamarca and Metropolitan Archdiocese of Trujillo on 30 June 1966. On 17 April 1963, some of its territory was lost to form the Territorial Prelature of Chota.

Between 2015 and 2023, the Diocese of Chiclayo was under the administration of Robert Francis Prevost, later a cardinal. Following the death of Pope Francis, Prevost (an American who had migrated to Peru in 1985), was elected by the College of Cardinals in Conclave on 8 May 2025. Prevost would take the papal name Pope Leo XIV.

== Bishops ==
- Bishop Daniel Figueroa Villón (17 December 1956 – 30 January 1967), previously Titular Bishop of Parnassus & Auxiliary Bishop of Arequipa (Peru) (12 April 1945 – 22 September 1946), Bishop of Huancayo (Peru) (22 September 1946 – 17 December 1956)
  - Auxiliary Bishop Luis Sánchez-Moreno Lira (30 April 1961 – 26 April 1968), Titular Bishop of Nilopolis (30 April 1961 – 10 January 1978), Bishop-Prelate of Yauyos (Peru) (26 April 1968 – 2 March 1996), later Metropolitan Archbishop of Arequipa (2 March 1996 – 29 November 2003)
- Bishop Ignacio María de Orbegozo y Goicoechea (26 April 1968 – 4 May 1998), previously Bishop-Prelate of Yauyos (12 April 1957 – 26 April 1968), Titular Bishop of Ariassus (29 October 1963 – 26 April 1968)
- Bishop Jesús Moliné Labarte (4 May 1998 – 3 November 2014), previously Coadjutor Bishop of Chiclayo (8 February 1997 – 4 May 1998)
- Bishop Robert Francis Prevost OSA (26 September 2015 – 30 January 2023), later Pope Leo XIV.
  - Apostolic Administrator (3 November 2014 – 26 September 2015)
- Bishop Guillermo Antonio Cornejo Monzón (Apostolic Administrator 12 April 2023 to 14 February 2024), Titular Bishop of Decoriana & Auxiliary Bishop of Lima (since 10 February 2021)
- Edinson Edgardo Farfán Córdova OSA (since 14 February 2024), previously Apostolic Administrator of Chuquibambilla (24 April 2018 to 8 April 2025)

=== Coadjutor bishop ===
- Jesús Moliné Labarte (1997–1998)

=== Auxiliary bishop ===
- Luis Sánchez-Moreno Lira (1961–1968), appointed Prelate of Yauyos

=== Other priests of this diocese who became bishops ===
- Marco Antonio Cortez Lara, appointed Coadjutor Bishop of Tacna y Moquegua in 2005
- Héctor Eduardo Vera Colona, appointed Bishop of Ica in 2007

== See also ==
- Roman Catholicism in Peru

== Sources and external links ==
- GCatholic.org, with incumbent biography links
- Catholic Hierarchy
- Diocese website
