= Herranz =

Herranz is a surname. Notable people with the surname include:

- Antonio López Herranz (1913–1959), Spanish football player and manager
- José María Izuzquiza Herranz (1925–2011), Roman Catholic bishop of the Apostolic Vicariate of Jaén en Peru, Peru
- Julián Cardinal Herranz Casado (born 1930), Spanish Cardinal of the Roman Catholic Church
- María Esther Herranz García (born 1969), Spanish politician and Member of the European Parliament
