= Frasnelli =

Frasnelli is an Italian surname. Notable people with the surname include:

- Homero Romulo Cristalli Frasnelli (1912 – 1981), known as J. Posadas, Argentine Trotskyist
- Loris Frasnelli (born 1979), Italian cross country skier
- Luana Frasnelli (born 1975), Italian ice hockey player

== See also ==
- Dante Frasnelli Tarter
