= St. Mary's Cathedral, Chiclayo =

Coordinates: 6.7717°S 79.8376°W

St. Mary's Cathedral
- Catedral de Santa María
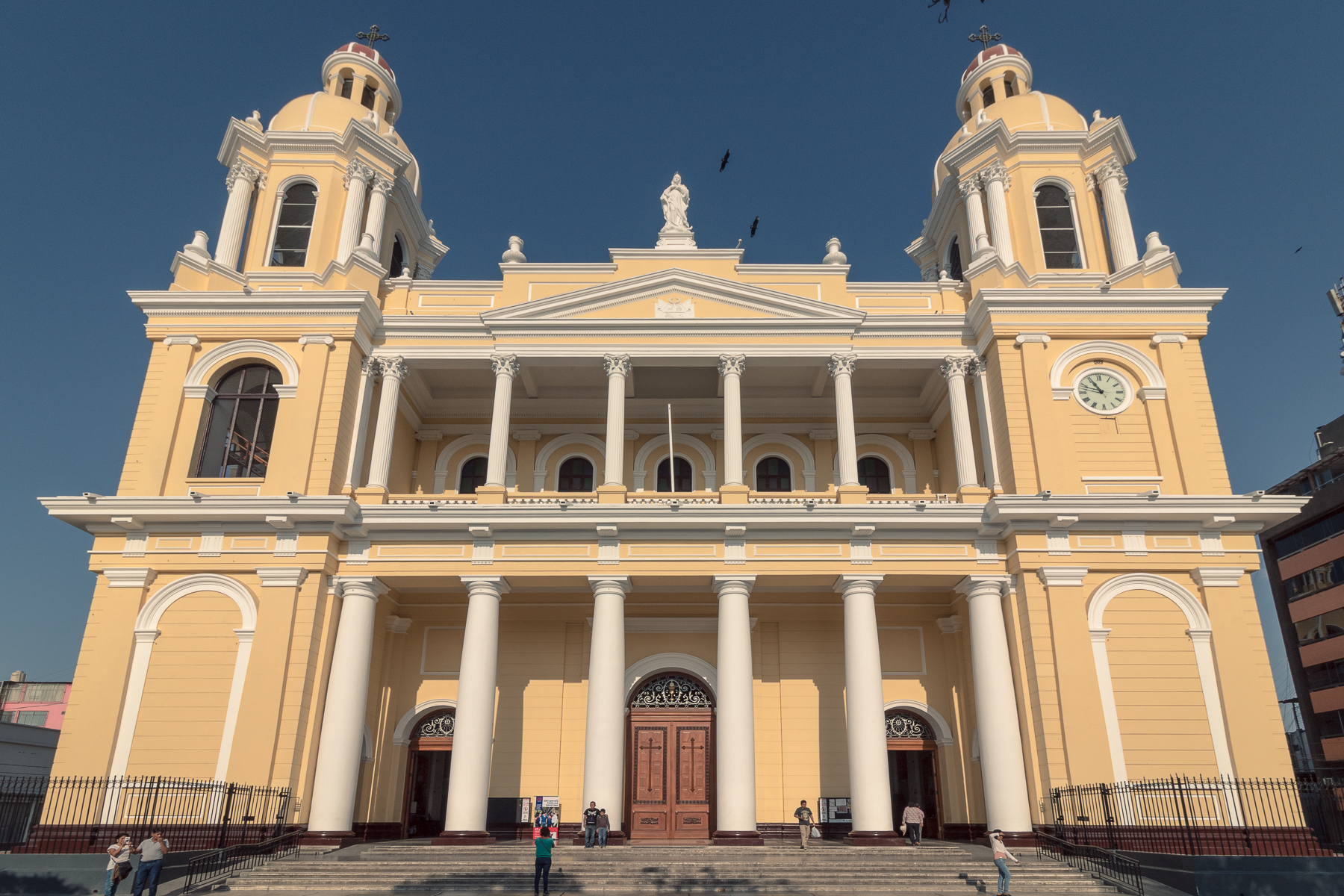
- St. Mary's Cathedral
- Location: Chiclayo
- Country: Peru
- Denomination: Roman Catholic Church

Architecture
- Style: Neoclassical

Administration
- Archdiocese: Archdiocese of Piura
- Diocese: Diocese of Chiclayo

Clergy
- Bishop: Edinson Edgardo Farfán Córdova

The Cathedral of Saint Mary (Spanish: Catedral de Santa María), commonly called Chiclayo Cathedral, is the seat of the Roman Catholic Diocese of Chiclayo in Chiclayo, Peru.

The cathedral church was built in the neo-classical style starting in 1869 according to designs and plans commissioned from Gustave Eiffel, nicknamed "Rose Meridionale". Construction was interrupted in 1871 due to lack of funds, and resumed only after the Congress of the Republic lent support a half-century later. Building resumed on February 13, 1928, and was completed in 1939.

The cruciform cathedral was designed in the neoclassical style. Its main façade features two bell towers and three portals, with the central one being the largest. The façade's gable, above the large second-story balcony, is topped with a statue of Santa María de los Valles de Chiclayo, in whose honor the Franciscans founded the modern city of Chiclayo in the 16th century. The crossing is surmounted by a large dome. Its four bells, "Ave Maria", "Asumpta", "Mater Dei", and "Gratia Plena" were cast in Germany and brought to Chiclayo via the Port of Pimentel.

In 2002, a comprehensive restoration and conservation of the atrium floors, exterior cornices, roofs, domes and bell towers of the building was carried out by Chiclayo architects Mario Alfredo Seclén Rivadeneira and Jorge Cosmópolis Bullón.

Pope Leo XIV, then known as Robert Francis Prevost, was Bishop of Chiclayo from 2015 to 2023 and regularly celebrated mass in the cathedral.

The cathedral is home to the venerated image of "Virgen Inmaculada Concepción." On 14 November 2026, Pope Leo XIV personally crowned the image during his apostolic visit to Peru.

== Gallery ==
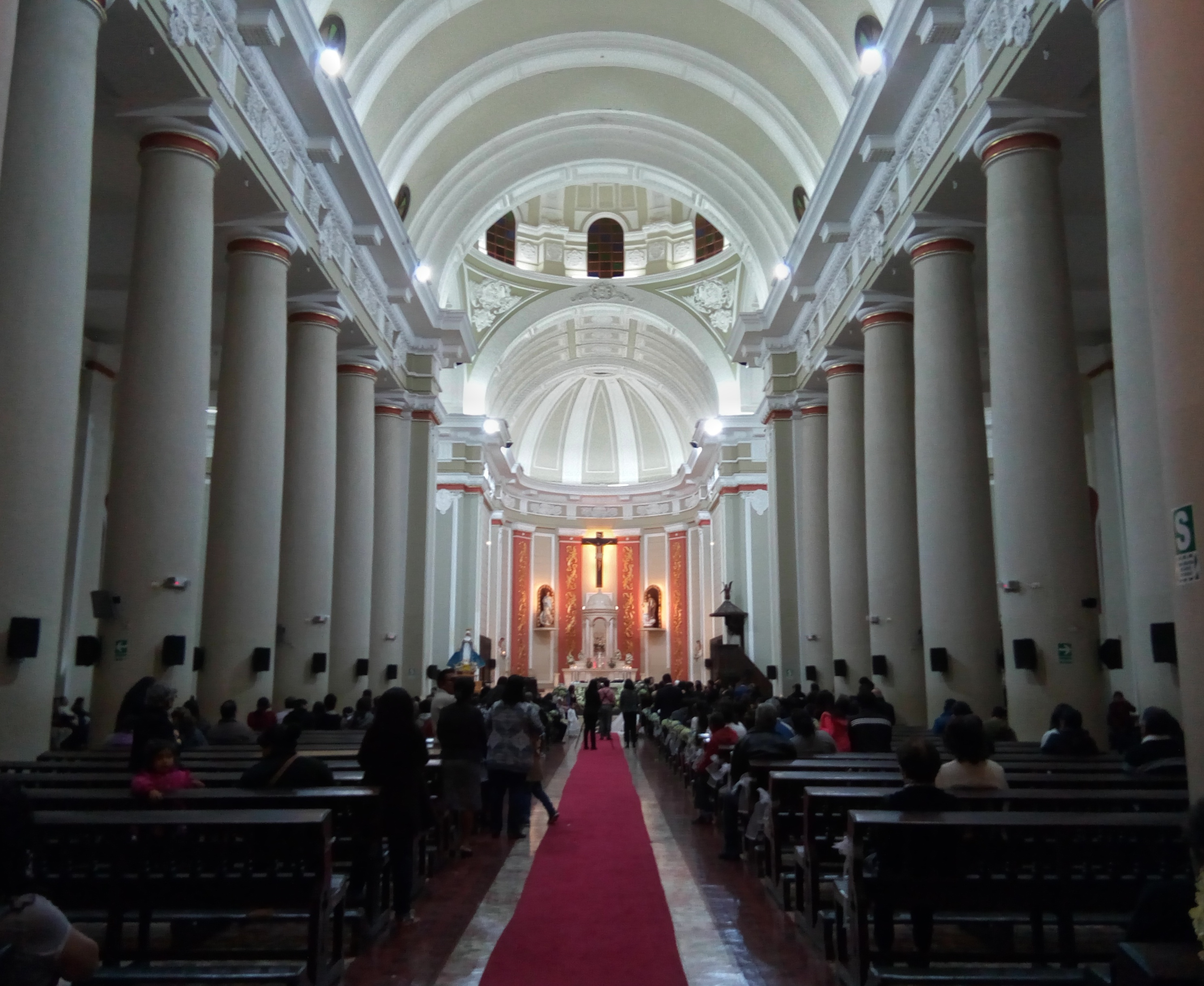
View down the nave

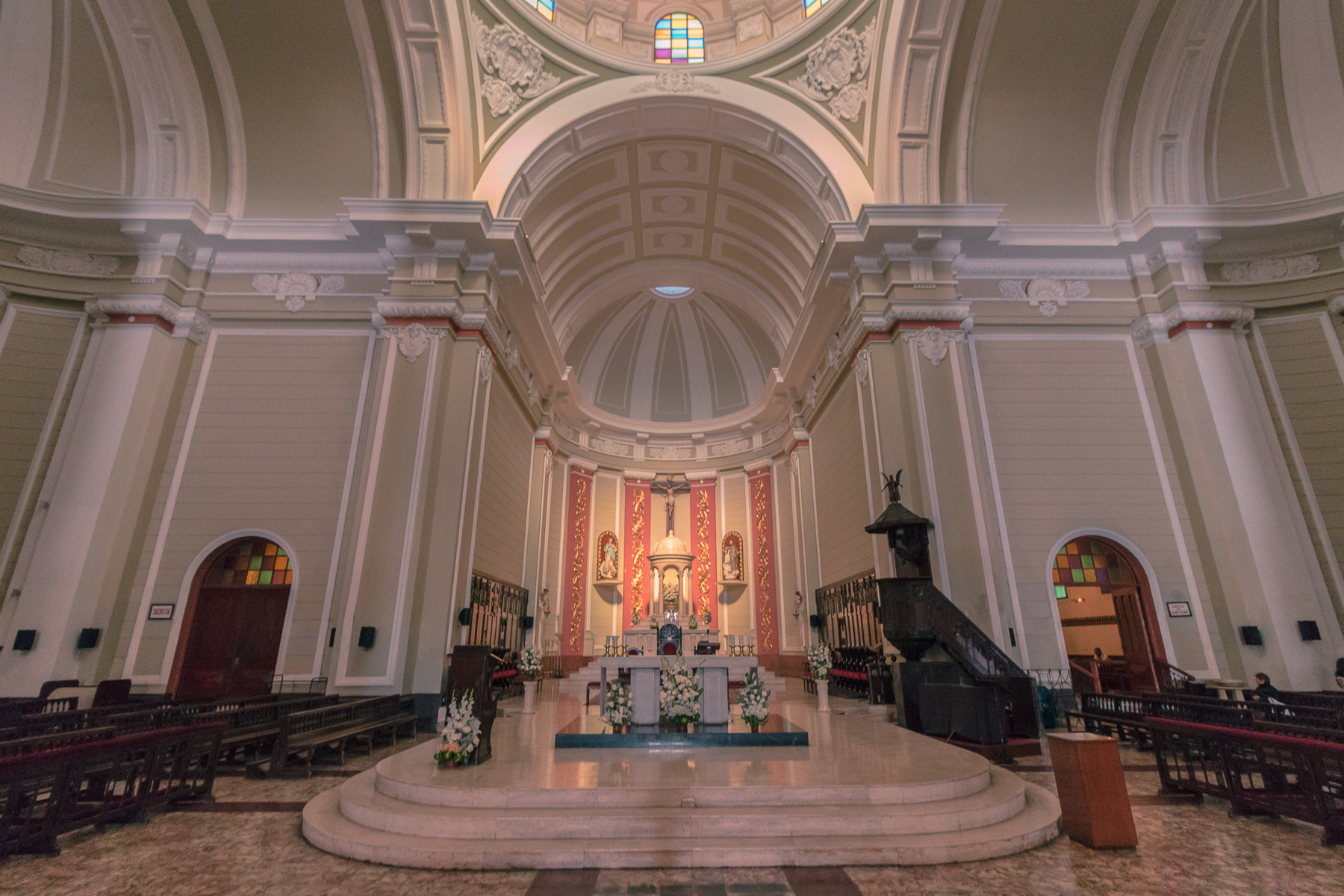
View of the sanctuary

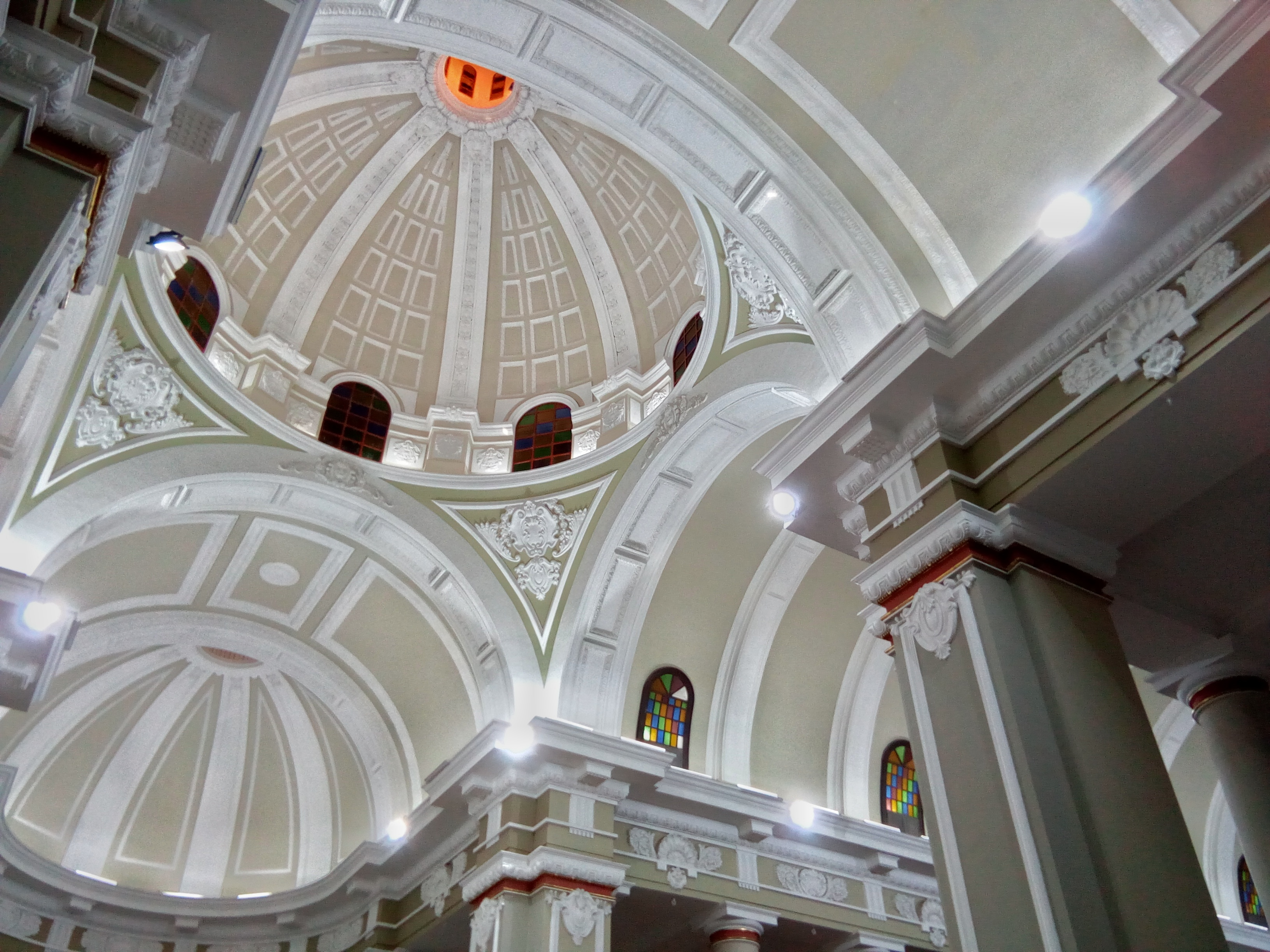
View of the vaulted ceiling

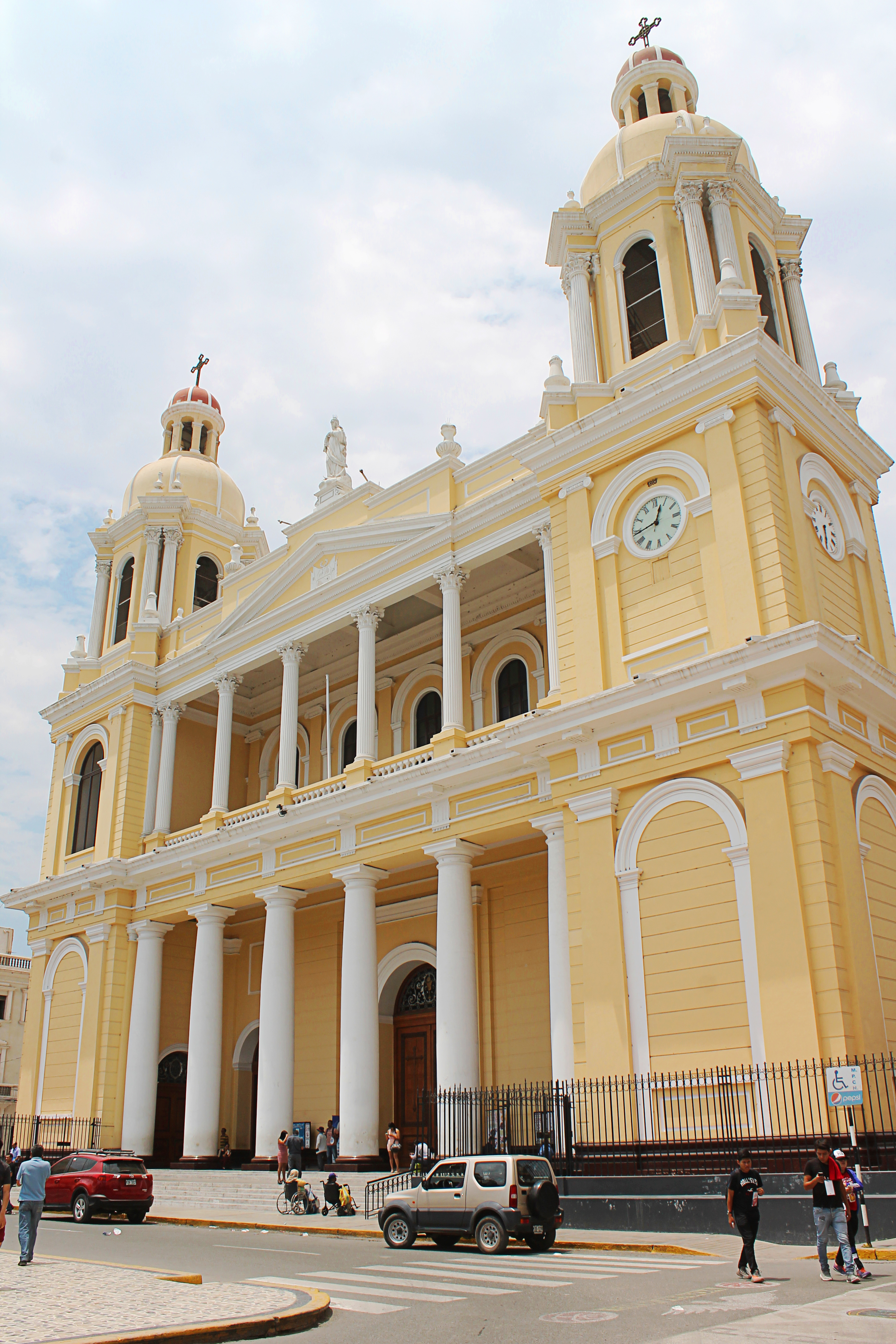
The cathedral as seen in 2018

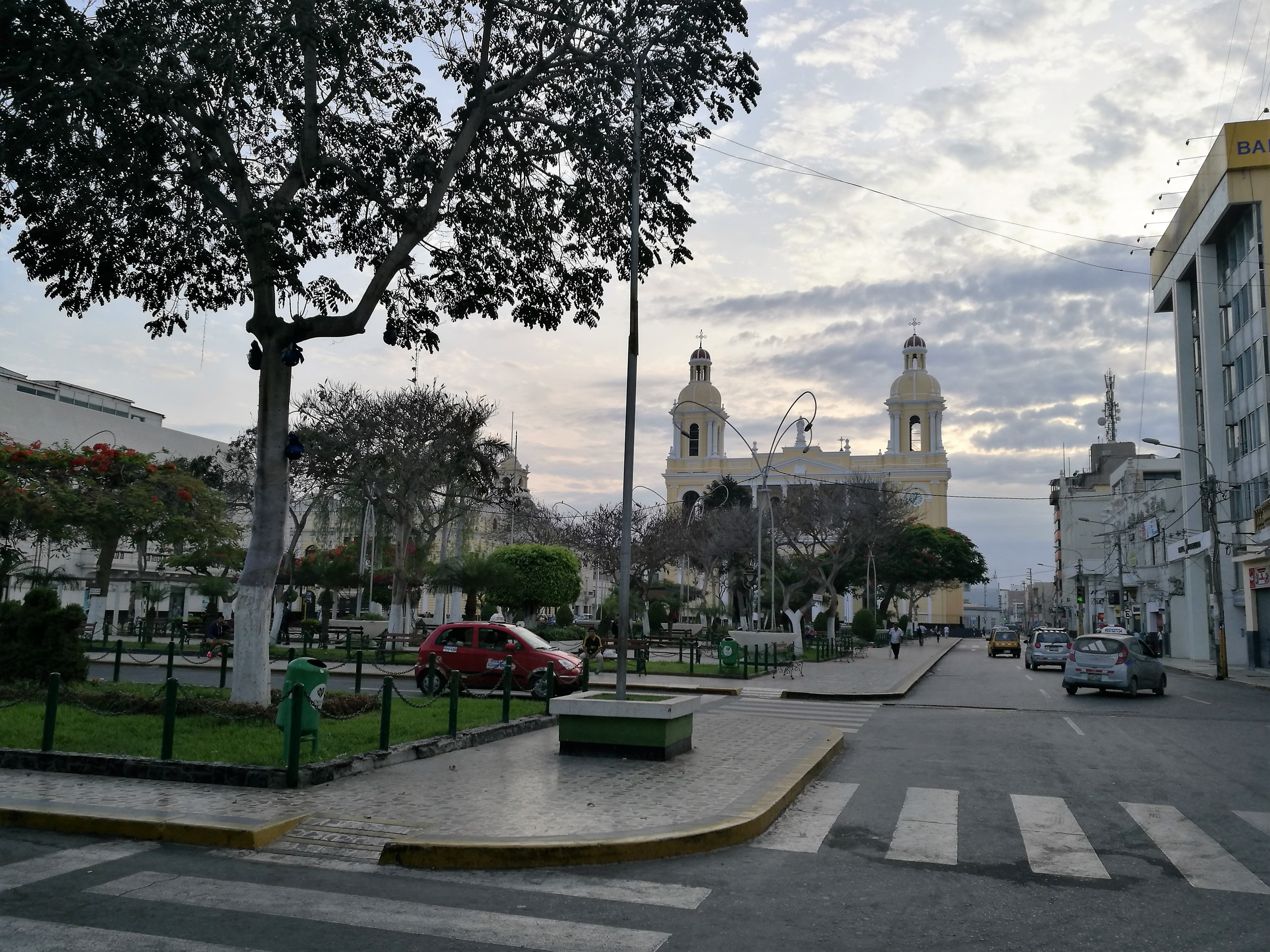
View from the Plaza de Armas de Chiclayo

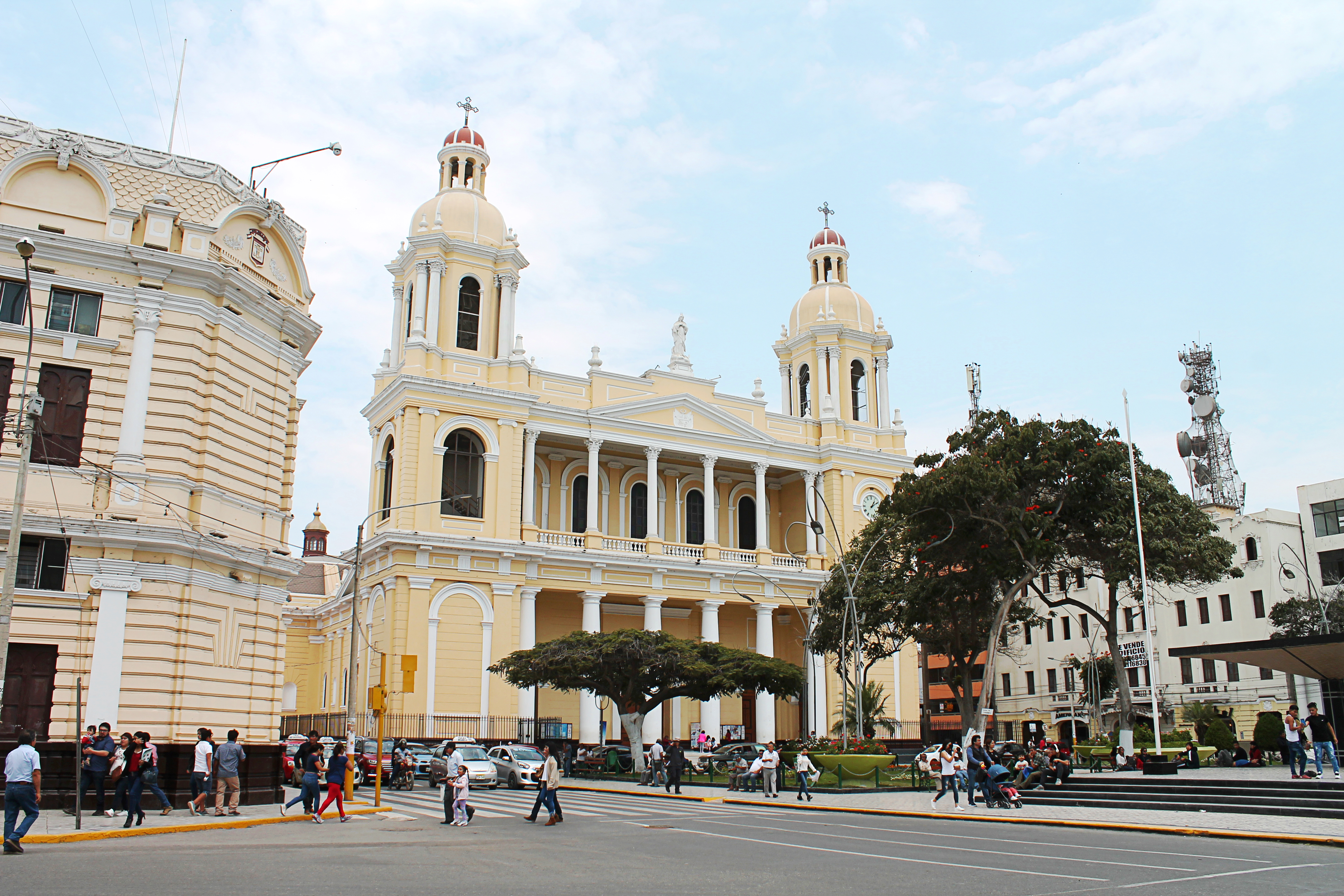
Exterior view of the cathedral

== See also ==
- Catholic Church in Peru
