= Javier Chércoles Blázquez =

Venezuelan business personality

- Born: 1964 (age 60–61); Caracas, Venezuela
- Education: UNED, Complutense University, ESADE
- Employer(s): Complutense University, King Juan Carlos University, PwC, Inditex, University of Dhaka

Javier Chércoles Blázquez born in Caracas, Venezuela in 1964, is a university professor and crisis advisor in humanitarian disasters.

== Trajectory ==
He holds a degree in law from UNED and in economics and business from Universidad Complutense.

Between 2000 and 2010 he worked for Inditex, a multinational corporation based in Galicia. Chércoles was responsible for preparing Zara's Internal Code of Ethics, a document that regulates the operation of the factories that work for Inditex.

He also worked for PwC.

=== Bangladesh ===
In 2008, Chércoles went to Bangladesh to personally check the situation of a factory in Dhaka, where there were verbal and physical abuse, as well as salary cuts. He acknowledged that the factory was in "very bad" condition, but said there was no evidence they were manufacturing for Inditex. He later discovered that he was associated with another factory that produced clothes for Zara. The workshops were close to each other, and Chércoles admitted that it was possible to transfer part of the production from one to another without Inditex's permission or knowledge. A few years earlier he had discovered that the victims of Bhopal disaster had not yet been compensated, because, as he told Kofi Annan, "there is no way to calculate them, nor any political intention (to pay them)".

As CSR director, he decided to deepen labor controls in the production chain, control measures with which Inditex's management did not agree. In 2010 he left the position receiving 1.57 million euros.

In April 2013, in Dhaka, Bangladesh, Rana Plaza building collapsed and 1,134 workers were killed. He was hired by Primark to pay 14 million euros to victims being the first multinational to deal with compensation.

=== At the University ===
He was voluntarily confined in Abbey of Santo Domingo de Silos for six months to write his doctoral thesis in English. Since June 2013, he has been working as a professor at University of Dhaka in Bangladesh, at the Institute of Disaster & Vulnerability Management Studies.

He was also a professor at Complutense, URJC and ESADE Universities and an academic lecturer at Harvard, Georgetown (United States), Andrés Bello (Caracas, Venezuela) and Antonio Ruiz de Montoya (Lima, Peru) universities

== Published work ==
- Navigating the Spider's Web. Building resilience after an industrial disaster in the ready-to-wear garment sector in Bangladesh (2012). Doctoral thesis, directed by Alfred Vernis i Domènech. ESADE of Ramon Llull University.

== See also ==
- Textile industry in Bangladesh
- 2013 Savar building collapse
