= Diocese of Huacho =

Roman Catholic diocese in Peru

Coordinates: 11.1000°S 77.6000°W

Diocese of Huacho Dioecesis Huachensis

Catholic
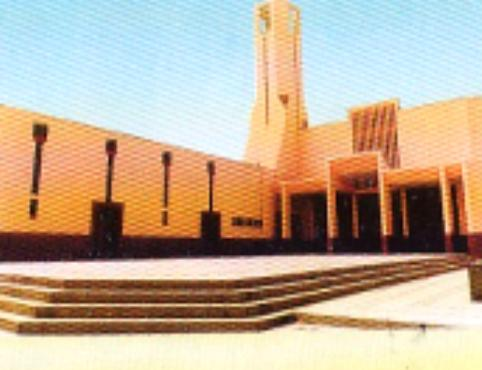
- Cathedral of St. Batholomew

Location
- Country: Peru
- Metropolitan: Lima

Statistics
- Area: 14,992 km^{2} (5,788 sq mi)
- Population: Total; Catholics: (as of 2023); 679,000; 613,000 (90.3%)
- Parishes: 61

Information
- Denomination: Catholic Church
- Sui iuris church: Latin Church
- Rite: Roman Rite
- Established: 15 May 1958; 68 years ago
- Cathedral: Catedral San Bartolomé
- Secular priests: 70 (59 Diocesan, 11 Religious Orders)

Current leadership
- Pope: Leo XIV
- Bishop: sede vacante
- Metropolitan Archbishop: Carlos Castillo Mattasoglio
- Apostolic Administrator: Luis Alberto Barrera Pacheco, M.C.C.J.
- Bishops emeritus: Antonio Santarsiero Rosa, O.S.I.

The Roman Catholic Diocese of Huacho (Latin: Huachen(sis)) is a diocese located in the city of Huacho in the ecclesiastical province of Lima in Peru.

== History ==
- 15 May 1958: Established as Diocese of Huacho from the Metropolitan Archdiocese of Lima

== Ordinaries ==
- Nemesio Rivera Meza (15 May 1958 – 28 January 1960), appointed Bishop of Cajamarca
- Pablo Ramírez Taboado, SS.CC. (28 January 1960 – 19 December 1966)
- Lorenzo León Alvarado, O. de M. (3 August 1967 – 22 April 2003), retired
  - Apostolic Administrator José Eduardo Velásquez Tarazona (5 April 2003 – 25 April 2004), Bishop of Huaraz
- Antonio Santarsiero Rosa, O.S.I. (4 February 2004 – 15 July 2026), retired
  - Apostolic Administrator Luis Alberto Barrera Pacheco, M.C.C.J. (15 July 2026 – Present), Bishop of Callao

== See also ==
- Roman Catholicism in Peru

== Sources ==
- GCatholic.org
- Catholic Hierarchy
- Diocese website
