= José Antonio Dammert Bellido =

Peruvian bishop

- Archbishop of Diocese of Cajamarca (emeritus)
- Church: Roman Catholic Church
- See: Diocese of Cajamarca
- In office: 1962–1992
- Predecessor: Nemesio Rivera Meza
- Successor: Ángel Francisco Simón Piorno
- Previous post: Bishop

Orders
- Ordination: December 21, 1946

Personal details
- Born: August 20, 1917 Lima, Peru
- Died: September 10, 2008 (aged 91) Lima, Peru

José Antonio Dammert Bellido (August 20, 1917 – September 10, 2008) was a Peruvian bishop of the Roman Catholic Church.

Bellido was born in Lima, Peru and ordained a priest on December 21, 1946. Bellido was appointed Auxiliary bishop of the Archdiocese of Lima, along with Titular Bishop of Amathus in Palaestina, on April 14, 1958 and ordained bishop May 15, 1958. On March 15, 1962 he was appointed Bishop of Diocese of Cajamarca and would remain in post until his retirement on December 1, 1992.

Bellido died on September 10, 2008.

== See also ==
- Archdiocese of Lima
- Diocese of Cajamarca
