= Nemesio Rivera Meza =

- Bishop of Cajamarca
- Church: Catholic Church
- Diocese: Diocese of Cajamarca
- In office: 28 January 1960 – 8 July 1961
- Predecessor: Pablo Ramírez Taboada
- Successor: José Antonio Dammert Bellido
- Other post: Titular Bishop of Diospolis Superior (1961-2007)
- Previous post: Bishop of Huacho (1958-1960)

Orders
- Ordination: 21 September 1946
- Consecration: 20 July 1958 by Juan Landázuri Ricketts

Personal details
- Born: 11 August 1918 San Jerónimo de Tunán District, Department of Junín, Peruvian Republic
- Died: 9 January 2007 (aged 88)

Nemesio Rivera Meza (11 August 1918 – 9 January 2007) was a Peruvian Roman Catholic bishop.

Rivera Meza was born in Peru and was ordained to the priesthood in 1946. He served as Bishop of Huacho from 1958 to 1960 and as Bishop of Cajamarca from 1960 to 1961. He held the title of Titular Bishop of Diospolis Superior from 1961 until his death in 2007.
