= Francisco de Ovanda =

Most Reverend Francisco de Ovanda
- Bishop-Elect of Trujillo
- Church: Catholic Church
- Diocese: Diocese of Trujillo
- In office: 1577
- Predecessor: Alonso Guzmán y Talavera
- Successor: Jeronimo de Carcamo

Francisco de Ovanda, O.F.M. or Franciscus de Ovanda was a Roman Catholic prelate who was appointed Bishop of Trujillo (1577).

== Biography ==
Francisco de Ovanda was ordained a priest in the Order of Friars Minor. On 15 Apr 1577, after the sudden resignation of his predecessor, Alonso Guzmán y Talavera, he was appointed during the papacy of Pope Gregory XIII as Bishop of Trujillo. He was never consecrated bishop.

== External links and additional sources ==
- Cheney, David M. "Archdiocese of Trujillo". Catholic-Hierarchy.org. (for Chronology of Bishops) ^{[self-published]}
- Chow, Gabriel. "Metropolitan Archdiocese of Trujillo (Peru)". GCatholic.org. (for Chronology of Bishops) ^{[self-published]}

Catholic Church titles
| Preceded by Alonso Guzmán y Talavera | Bishop-Elect of Trujillo; 1577 | Succeeded by Jeronimo de Carcamo |
