= Héctor Miguel Cabrejos Vidarte =

Peruvian prelate

The Most Reverend Héctor Miguel Cabrejos Vidarte O.F.M.
- Archbishop of Trujillo
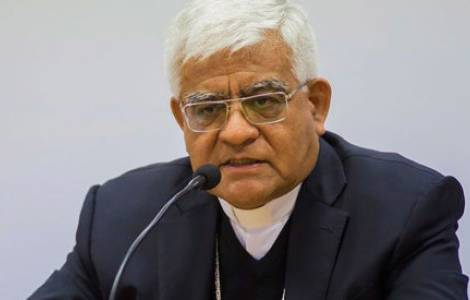
- Church: Roman Catholic Church
- Archdiocese: Trujillo
- See: Trujillo
- Appointed: 29 July 1999
- Installed: 11 September 1999
- Term ended: 11 February 2025
- Predecessor: Manuel Prado Perez-Rosas
- Successor: Gilberto Vizcarra
- Other posts: President of the Peruvian Episcopal Conference (2018-); President of the Latin American Episcopal Council (2019-2025)
- Previous posts: Auxiliary Bishop of Lima (1988-96); Titular Bishop of Belesasa (1988-98); Military Ordinary of Peru (1996-99); President of the Peruvian Episcopal Conference (2006-12)

Orders
- Ordination: 7 December 1974
- Consecration: 7 August 1988 by Juan Landázuri Ricketts

Personal details
- Born: Héctor Miguel Cabrejos Vidarte; 5 July 1948 (age 78) Chota, Peru
- Motto: Gratia et Misericordia
- Coat of arms: Héctor Miguel Cabrejos Vidarte's coat of arms

Héctor Miguel Cabrejos Vidarte, O.F.M. (born 5 July 1948) is a Peruvian prelate of the Catholic Church who was the Archbishop of Trujillo from 1999 to 2025. He has been a bishop since 1988 and currently heads the Latin American Bishops Council (CELAM).

== Biography ==
Héctor Miguel Cabrejos Vidarte was born in Chota on 5 July 1948. He took his vows as a Franciscan on 29 June 1974 and on 7 December 1991 he was ordained a priest of that order. On 20 June 1988, Pope John Paul II named him auxiliary bishop of Lima. He received his episcopal consecration on 7 August from Cardinal Juan Landázuri Ricketts, Archbishop of Lima. On 6 February 1996, Pope John Paul named him head of the Military Ordinariate of Peru where he took office on 7 March 1998. On 29 July 1999 he was named Archbishop of Trujillo.

Pope John Paul named him a member of the Pontifical Commission for Latin America on 5 July 2004. (Note: Pope Francis confirmed him as a member of that Commission on 15 January 2014.)

He was president of the Peruvian Bishops Conference from 2009 to 2012, and he began another term in that in 2018. He was elected to a four-year term as president of the Latin American Bishops Council (CELAM) in May 2019.

He was a participant in the Synod of Bishops for the Pan-Amazon region in 2019. He was one of four Synod prelates elected on 7 October to the thirteen-person committee to prepare the Synod's concluding document. (Note: Five other members are synod officials who serve ex offico and four are named by Pope Francis.)

Cabrejas submitted his resignation as archbishop to Pope Francis in 2023 as he reached the mandatory retirement age of 75. He also stepped down from the Peruvian Episcopal Conference in January 2025. On 11 February 2025, his resignation was accepted by the Vatican amid criticism over his failure to stop abuses by the Catholic organization Sodalitium Christianae Vitae when he was president of the Peruvian Episcopal Conference.
