= Louis Francis Kelleher =

American Catholic prelate (1889–1946)

His Excellency, The Most Reverend Louis Francis Kelleher
- Auxiliary Bishop of Boston; Titular Bishop of Thenae
- Church: Catholic Church
- Archdiocese: Boston

Orders
- Ordination: April 3, 1915 by Basilio Pompili
- Consecration: June 8, 1945 by Richard Cushing

Personal details
- Born: August 4, 1869 Cambridge, Massachusetts, US
- Died: November 26, 1946 (aged 77) Somerville, Massachusetts, US,
- Education: Boston College; Urban College
- Motto: Apostolus Jesu (Apostle of Jesus)

Louis Francis Kelleher (August 4, 1889 – November 26, 1946) was an American prelate of the Roman Catholic Church in the United States. He served as an auxiliary bishop of the Archdiocese of Boston in Massachusetts from 1945 to 1946.

== Early life ==
Louis Kelleher was born in Cambridge, Massachusetts, on August 4, 1889. He attended St. Mary's School in Cambridge and then St. Thomas Aquinas College. Kelleher entered Boston College in 1910. Deciding to become a priest, he entered the archdiocesan seminary. He was then sent to Rome to reside at the Pontifical North American College while studying at the Urban College.

== Priesthood ==
Kelleher was ordained to the priesthood in Rome at the Archbasilica of Saint John Lateran for the Archdiocese of Boston on April 3, 1915 by Cardinal Basilio Pompilj. He was awarded a Doctor of Divinity degree from the Urban College.

After his ordination, the archdiocese appointed Kelleher as assistant pastor at St. Thomas Church in Boston. He was later named as pastor of St. John Parish in Canton, Massachusetts. In 1918, Kelleher was named as a professor of philosophy and dogmatic theology at St. John's Seminary in Boston.Additionally, he was named pastor in 1940 of St. Catherine of Genoa Parish in Somerville, Massachusetts.

== Auxiliary Bishop of Boston ==
On April 21, 1945, Kelleher was appointed titular bishop of Thenae and as an auxiliary bishop of Boston by Pope Pius XII. He was consecrated on June 8, 1945, at the Cathedral of the Holy Cross in Boston by Archbishop Richard James Cushing.

Kelleher died of a heart attack on November 26, 1946, in Somerville.He was buried at Calvary Cemetery in Woburn, Massachusetts.
