= Autenti =

Africa Proconsularis (125 AD)

Autenti (Latin: Autentensis) was a Roman–Berber civitas and bishopric in Africa Proconsularis. It was a diocese of the Roman Catholic Church.

Autenti was a civitas of the Roman province of Byzacena, the ruins of which are situated between Sbeitla and Thyna in modern Tunisia. The town was the seat of an ancient episcopal see.

There are two known bishops of Autenti.

- Hortensius was among the Catholic bishops summoned to Carthage in 484 by Vandal king Huneric.
- The second is Optatus Dei gratia episcopus Ecclesiae Sanctae Autentensis, who was one of the signatories of the letter addressed by the bishops of Byzacena in 646 Emperor Constans II.

Both these bishops are from late antiquity with no references to the diocese during the great councils of the 4th century indicating that the bishopric may have been of late establishment.

Today Autenti survives as titular bishopric and the current bishop is Andrés Amaury Rosario Henriquez, auxiliary bishop of Santiago de los Caballeros.

== Bishops ==
- Ortensio (fl. 484)
- Optato (fl. 641)
- José Juan Luciano Carlos Metzinger Greff (1964–1992)
- Francisco Ovidio Vera Intriago (1992–2014)
- Gilberto Alfredo Vizcarra Mori (2014–2025)
- Andrés Amaury Rosario Henriquez (2025–current)
