= Lorenzo León Alvarado =

Peruvian priest (1928–2020)

Lorenzo León Alvarado O. de M.
- Bishop of Huacho
- Church: Catholic Church
- Diocese: Diocese of Huacho
- In office: 3 August 1967 – 22 April 2003
- Predecessor: Pablo Ramírez Taboada
- Successor: Antonio Santarsiero Rosa

Orders
- Ordination: 27 January 1952 by Jacinto Valdivia Ortiz
- Consecration: 17 September 1967 by Juan Landázuri Ricketts

Personal details
- Born: 31 May 1928 Callao, Peru
- Died: 17 February 2020 (aged 91) Lima, Peru

Lorenzo León Alvarado (31 May 1928 – 17 February 2020) was a Peruvian Catholic bishop.

León Alvarado was born in Peru and was ordained to the priesthood in 1952. He served as Bishop of Huacho from 1967 to 2003. He died on 17 February 2020.
