= Alonso Guzmán y Talavera =

Most Reverend Alonso Guzmán y Talavera
- Bishop-Elect of Trujillo
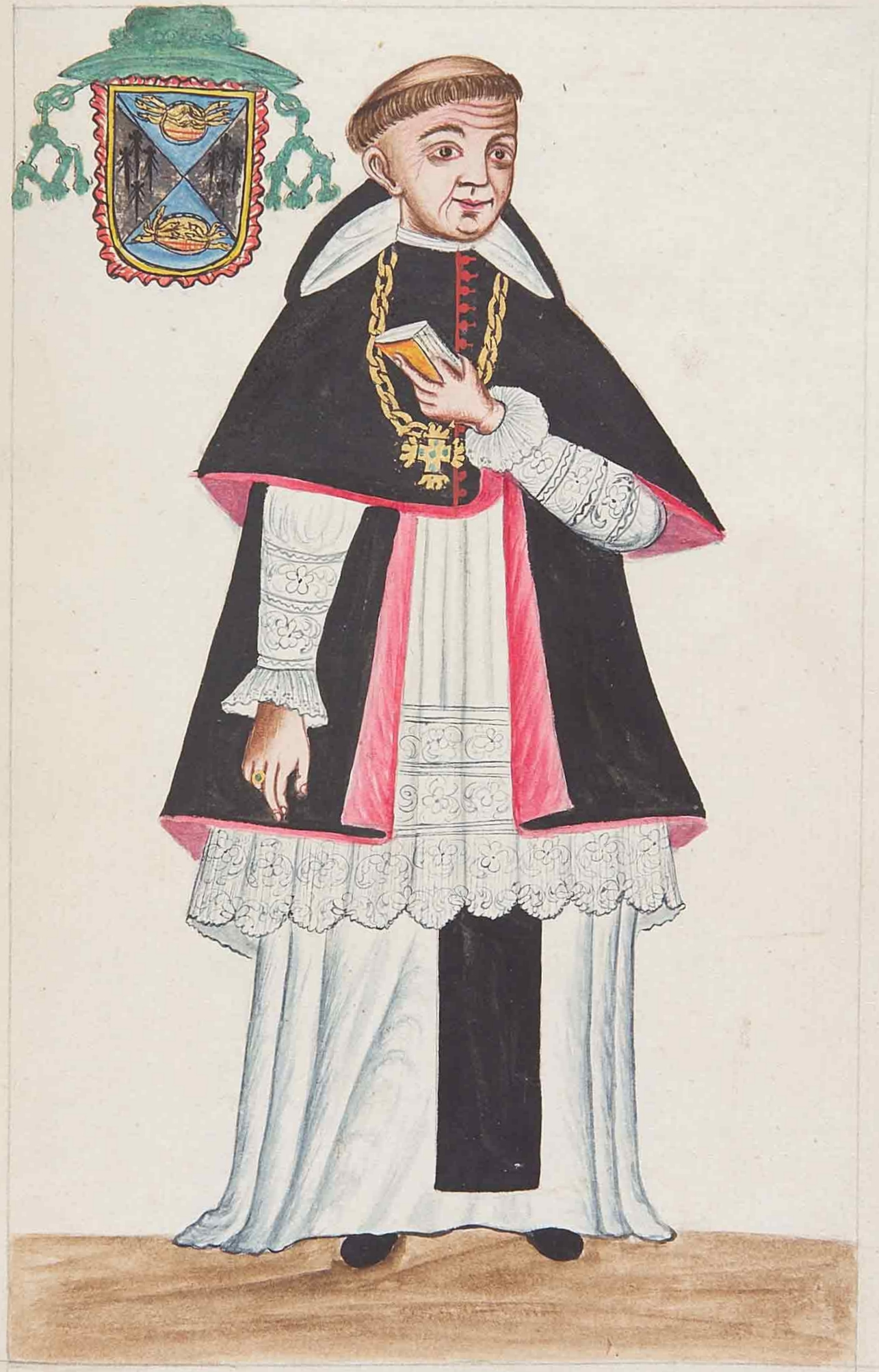
- Alonso Guzmán y Talavera
- Church: Catholic Church
- Diocese: Diocese of Trujillo
- In office: 1577
- Predecessor: None
- Successor: Francisco de Ovanda

Alonso Guzmán y Talavera, O.S.H. was a Roman Catholic prelate who was appointed the first Bishop of Trujillo (1577).

== Biography ==
Alonso Guzmán y Talavera was ordained a priest in the Order of Saint Jerome. In 1577, he was appointed during the papacy of Pope Gregory XIII as Bishop of Trujillo. He was consecrated bishop but then immediately resigned from his posting for which the reason is not known.

== External links and additional sources ==
- Cheney, David M. "Archdiocese of Trujillo". Catholic-Hierarchy.org. (for Chronology of Bishops) ^{[self-published]}
- Chow, Gabriel. "Metropolitan Archdiocese of Trujillo (Peru)". GCatholic.org. (for Chronology of Bishops) ^{[self-published]}

Catholic Church titles
| Preceded by None | Bishop-Elect of Trujillo; 1577 | Succeeded by Francisco de Ovanda |
