= Jesús Moliné Labarte =

Spanish catholic Bishop (born 1939)

The Most Reverend Jesús Moliné Labarta
- Bishop Emeritus of Chiclayo
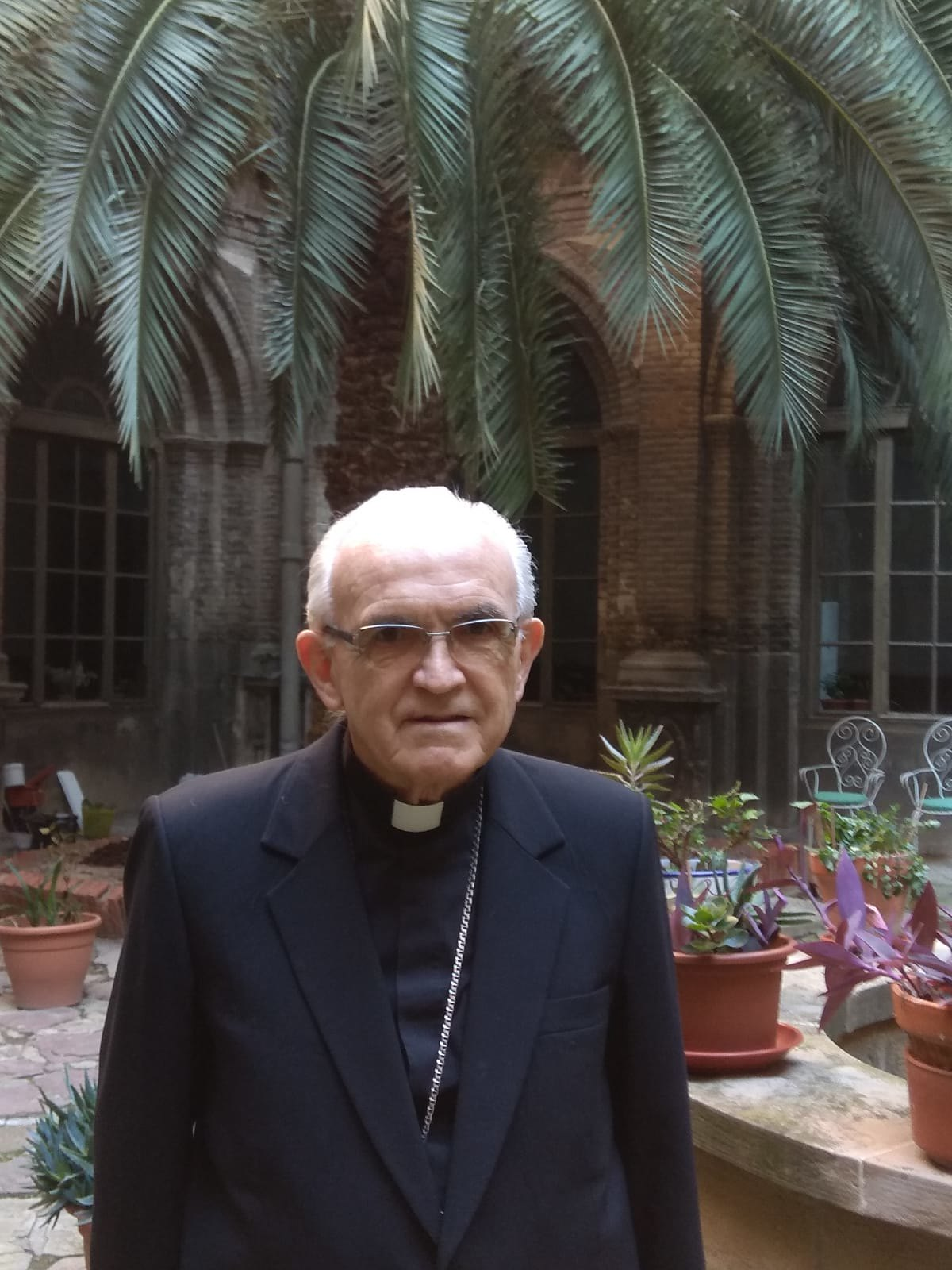
- Church: Catholic Church
- Archdiocese: Roman Catholic Archdiocese of Piura
- Diocese: Roman Catholic Diocese of Chiclayo
- Appointed: 4 May 1998
- Term ended: 3 November 2014
- Predecessor: Ignacio María de Orbegozo y Goicoechea
- Successor: Robert Francis Prevost

Orders
- Ordination: 28 March 1965
- Consecration: 19 March 1997 by Ignacio María de Orbegozo y Goicoechea

Personal details
- Born: January 29, 1939 (age 87) La Puebla de Alfindén, Spain
- Denomination: Roman Catholic
- Residence: Zaragoza, Spain
- Education: University of Navarra
- Motto: Ut mittat operarios (Latin for 'So that he may send workers')
- Coat of arms

Jesús Moliné Labarta (born 29 January 1939) is a Spanish-born Peruvian Roman Catholic prelate who served as the Bishop of Chiclayo from 1998 to 2014. He is currently Bishop Emeritus of Chiclayo.

== Early life and education ==
Moliné Labarta completed his secondary education at the Minor Seminary of Zaragoza and pursued studies in philosophy and theology at the Metropolitan Seminary of Zaragoza. He earned a doctorate in canon law from the University of Navarra in Pamplona.

== Priestly ministry ==
He was ordained a priest on 28 March 1965 for the Archdiocese of Zaragoza. From 1965 to 1968, he served as coadjutor of the parish of El Salvador and Santa María in Ejea de los Caballeros and taught religion at the Instituto Mixto No. 1 in Zaragoza.

In 1973, he moved to Peru, where he worked as a professor at the University of Piura, pastor of Santa Ana de La Huaca parish in Piura, and member of the Metropolitan Tribunal. Returning to Spain in 1977, he served as a professor at the Diocesan Work of Santo Domingo de Silos in Zaragoza and as a judge at the Metropolitan Tribunal of Zaragoza.

He returned to Peru in 1987, where he was a professor of theology and philosophy at the San Juan María Vianney Seminary in Piura, professor at the University of Piura, judge of the diocesan tribunal, and pastoral collaborator in the parishes of Nuestra Señora de Fátima (1987–1992) and San Pedro y San Pablo (1992–1997) in Piura. In 1993, Archbishop Óscar Rolando Cantuarias Pastor appointed him rector of the Metropolitan Seminary of Piura.

== Episcopal ministry ==
On 8 February 1997, Pope John Paul II appointed him Coadjutor Bishop of Chiclayo. He received episcopal consecration on 19 March 1997 in the Sanctuary of Nuestra Señora de la Paz in Chiclayo from Bishop Ignacio María de Orbegozo y Goicoechea, with Archbishop Óscar Rolando Cantuarias Pastor and Apostolic Nuncio Fortunato Baldelli serving as co-consecrators.

Upon the death of Bishop Orbegozo y Goicoechea on 4 May 1998, Moliné Labarta succeeded him as Bishop of Chiclayo. He was instrumental in the establishment of the Universidad Católica Santo Toribio de Mogrovejo in Chiclayo in 1998, continuing the project initiated by his predecessor, and served as its first Grand Chancellor.

During his tenure, he focused on pastoral visits and the development of the diocesan seminary. He conducted ad limina visits to Rome in June 2002 and May 2009.

Pope Francis accepted his resignation on 3 November 2014 upon reaching the age limit of 75. He then returned to Spain and resides at the "San Carlos" priestly residence in Zaragoza.

== Publications ==
Moliné Labarta has authored several works, including:

- El demonio, ¿qué hay de verdad sobre él? (Nuevo Tiempo, 1977)
- Dar razón de nuestra fe (Universidad de Piura, 1991)
- Por las sendas de la nueva evangelización: consolidado de documentos doctrinales y planes pastorales (1997–2011) (Universidad Católica Santo Toribio de Mogrovejo, 2012)
- Mons. Daniel Figueroa Villón (Universidad Católica Santo Toribio de Mogrovejo, 2018)
- Los jóvenes y la fe (Self-published, 2021)
- Recuerdos de mi Episcopado (Self-published, 2021)
- Ignacio M.ª de Orbegozo y Goicoechea: II Obispo de Chiclayo 1968–1998 (Universidad Católica Santo Toribio de Mogrovejo, 2023)

== Honors ==
- Doctor honoris causa from Universidad Señor de Sipán, Chiclayo (2014)
- Medal Señor de Sipán from the Lambayeque region (2012)
- Medal of the City of La Arena and a crucifix in recognition of his pastoral work (2015)

== See also ==
- Roman Catholic Diocese of Chiclayo
- Catholic Church in Peru
