= José Ignacio Alemany Grau =

Spanish-born Peruvian Roman Catholic bishop

The Most Reverend José Ignacio Alemany Grau C.Ss.R.
- Bishop Emeritus of Chachapoyas
- Church: Catholic Church
- Diocese: Chachapoyas
- Appointed: 17 August 1995
- Installed: 15 October 1995
- Term ended: 18 May 2000
- Predecessor: Ángel Francisco Simón Piorno
- Successor: Emiliano Antonio Cisneros Martínez

Orders
- Ordination: 11 January 1959
- Consecration: 15 October 1995 by Ángel Francisco Simón Piorno

Personal details
- Born: 27 January 1934 (age 92) Madrid, Spain

José Ignacio Alemany Grau C.Ss.R. (born 27 January 1934) is a Spanish-born Peruvian Roman Catholic prelate who served as a bishop of the Diocese of Chachapoyas from 1995 to 2000. He was appointed to the diocese on 17 August 1995 and was consecrated a bishop on 15 October 1995.

== Early life and priesthood ==
Alemany was born in Madrid, Spain, on 27 January 1934. According to an interview published by the Redemptorists in 2023, he grew up in a Catholic family with a strong devotion to Our Lady of Perpetual Help. Two of his aunts were religious, and five of the family's eight children eventually entered religious life. Alemany entered the Redemptorist minor seminary at the age of 11.

He was ordained a priest on 11 January 1959 for the Congregation of the Most Holy Redeemer. He went to Peru in 1963 and spent the following decades engaged principally in missionary work. The Peruvian Episcopal Conference's directory of ecclesiastical jurisdictions records his priestly ordination, episcopal appointment and consecration.

Among his missionary activities was work in the Piura region, including Huancabamba, as well as work promoting religious vocations in the Diocese of Chulucanas. He also developed programs intended to increase the participation of lay people in Redemptorist missions.

Alemany was active as an author and communicator. Beginning in 1965, he published a Sunday homily reflection in newspapers in Peru, later extending the work to newspapers in several other cities. He subsequently worked in radio and television and served as director of Radio María Perú for seven years. He also used the Internet and social media as means of religious education and evangelization.

== Episcopate ==
On 17 August 1995, Pope John Paul II appointed Alemany bishop of Chachapoyas. In the time of his appointment, he served as the superior of Redemptorist's community in Piura.

He was consecrated bishop on 15 October 1995. His principal consecrator was Ángel Francisco Simón Piorno, bishop of Cajamarca, with Fortunato Baldelli and Oscar Rolando Cantuarias Pastor serving as principal co-consecrators.

Alemany's episcopate in Chachapoyas lasted less than five years. On 18 May 2000, Pope John Paul II accepted his resignation from the pastoral government of the diocese in accordance with canon 401 §2 of the 1983 Code of Canon Law. The acceptance was announced by the Holy See on 25 May 2000.

Following his resignation, he became bishop emeritus of Chachapoyas.

== Missionary and media work ==
After his episcopal ministry, Alemany continued his missionary and evangelization activities. In a 2023 interview, he described his work with the international Evangelization 2000 project and the subsequent Asociación Católica Evangelización Siempre. He also reported having written numerous short works on Christian formation, prayer and evangelization.

His media work has included radio, television, print publications and Internet-based religious programming. In 2023, the Redemptorists described him as continuing to write and publish, and noted his involvement in online religious broadcasts and publications.
