= Diocese of Lurín =

Roman Catholic diocese in Peru

Coordinates: 12°16′42″S 76°52′58″W

Diocese of Lurín Dioecesis Lurinensis

Catholic

Location
- Country: Peru
- Ecclesiastical province: Lima

Statistics
- Area: 185 km^{2} (71 sq mi)
- Population: Total; Catholics: (as of 2004); 2,271,000; 2,313,000 (85.0%)

Information
- Rite: Latin Rite
- Cathedral: Catedral San Pedro

Current leadership
- Pope: Leo XIV
- Bishop: Carlos García Camader

The Roman Catholic Diocese of Lurín (Latin: Lurinen(sis)) is a diocese located in the Lurín District in the ecclesiastical province of Lima in Peru.

== History ==
- 14 December 1996: Established as Diocese of Lurín from the Metropolitan Archdiocese of Lima

== Bishops ==
=== Ordinaries ===
- José Ramón Gurruchaga Ezama, S.D.B. (14 December 1996 – 17 June 2006)
- Carlos García Camader (since 17 June 2006)

=== Auxiliary bishop ===
- Salvador Piñeiro García-Calderón (2003-2006?), appointed Archbishop of Ayacucho o Huamanga in 2011

=== Another priest of this diocese who became bishop ===
- Cristóbal Bernardo Mejía Corral, appointed Bishop of Chulucanas in 2020

== See also ==
- Roman Catholicism in Peru

== Sources ==
- GCatholic.org
- Catholic Hierarchy
