= Diocese of Cajamarca =

Diocese of the Catholic Church in Peru

Coordinates: 7.1567°S 78.5183°W

Diocese of Cajamarca Dioecesis Caiamarcensis

Catholic
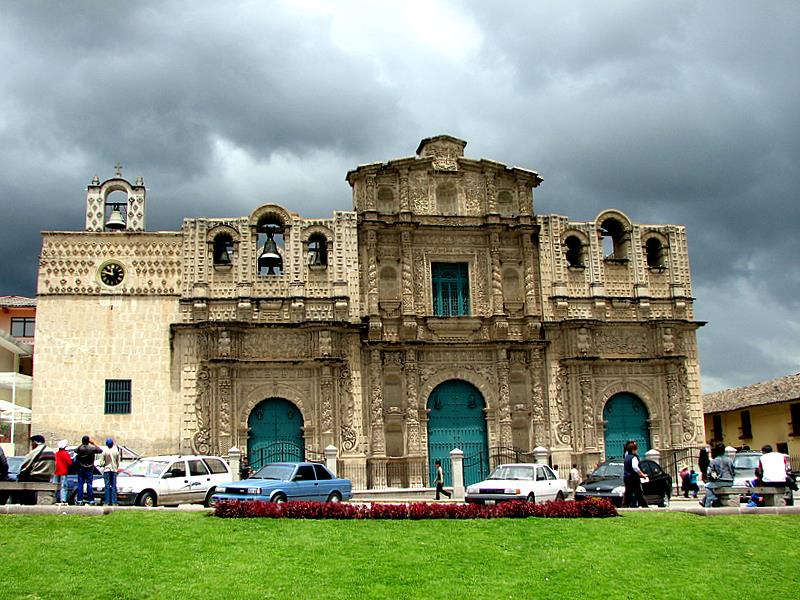
- Cathedral of St. Catherine

Location
- Country: Peru
- Ecclesiastical province: Trujillo

Statistics
- Area: 15,333 km^{2} (5,920 sq mi)
- Population: Total; Catholics: (as of 2006); 844,000; 804,000 (95.3%)

Information
- Denomination: Catholic Church
- Sui iuris church: Latin Church
- Rite: Roman Rite
- Cathedral: Catedral Santa Catalina

Current leadership
- Pope: Leo XIV
- Bishop: Isaac-C. Martínez Chuquizana, M.S.A.
- Metropolitan Archbishop: Gilberto Alfredo Vizcarra Mori SJ

Map

The Diocese of Cajamarca (Latin: Caiamarcen(sis)) is a Latin Church ecclesiastical territory or diocese of the Catholic Church located in the city of Cajamarca, Peru. It is a suffragan diocese in the ecclesiastical province of the metropolitan Archdiocese of Trujillo.

== History ==
- April 5, 1908: Established as Diocese of Cajamarca from the Diocese of Chachapoyas and Diocese of Trujillo

== Leadership ==
- Bishops of Cajamarca, in reverse chronological order
  - Bishop Isaac-C. Martínez Chuquizana, M.S.A. (2021.10.23 – present)
  - Bishop José Carmelo Martínez Lázaro, O.A.R. (2004.10.12 – 2021.10.23)
  - Bishop Ángel Francisco Simón Piorno (1995.03.18 – 2004.02.04), appointed Bishop of Chimbote
  - Archbishop Matias Patrício de Macêdo (1990.07.12 – 2000.07.12)
  - Bishop José Antonio Dammert Bellido (1962.03.19 – 1992.12.01)
  - Bishop Nemesio Rivera Meza (1960.01.28 – 1961.07.08)
  - Bishop Pablo Ramírez Taboado, SS.CC. (1947.09.05 – 1960.01.28), appointed Bishop of Huacho
  - Bishop Teodosio Moreno Quintana (1940.12.15 – 1947.06.27), appointed Bishop of Huánuco
  - Bishop Giovanni Giuseppe Guillén y Salazar, C.M. (1933.12.21 – 1937.09.16)
  - Bishop Antonio Rafael Villanueva, O.F.M. (1928 – 1933.08.02)
  - Bishop Francesco di Paolo Grozo (1910.03.21 – 1928)

== See also ==
- Roman Catholicism in Peru

== Sources ==
- GCatholic.org
- Catholic Hierarchy
