= Dante Frasnelli Tarter =

Italian priest (1925–2020)

Dante Frasnelli Tarter OSJ
- Prelate of Huarí
- Church: Catholic Church
- See: Territorial Prelature of Huarí
- In office: 3 August 1967 – 13 June 2001
- Predecessor: Marco Libardoni
- Successor: Antonio Santarsiero Rosa
- Previous post: Titular Bishop of Urusi (1967-1977)

Orders
- Ordination: 6 July 1952
- Consecration: 1 November 1967 by Carlos Jurgens Byrne

Personal details
- Born: 6 January 1925 Dardine (in southern Predaia), Trentino, Kingdom of Italy
- Died: 10 January 2020 (aged 95) Lima, Peru

Dante Frasnelli Tarter (6 January 1925 – 10 January 2020) was an Italian-Peruvian Catholic bishop.

Frasnelli Tarter was born in Italy and was ordained to the priesthood in 1952. He served as territorial prelate of Huari, Peru, before it became a diocese, from 1967 to 2001.In all period he served as a bishop he was known for his social work for the poor. He was loved for all people in Huari, specially for those who had little. He worked with the ONG “Caritas” which was encharged of receiving donations( food, clothes, toys) As soon as donations were received Bishop Dante will give it to all people who need it. He was also known for his hard work in evangelization, in all his time as a bishop he would ride his horse to all places around Huari, explaining people the love of God, and the importance of being good catholic.
