= Thyna =

- Commune and town
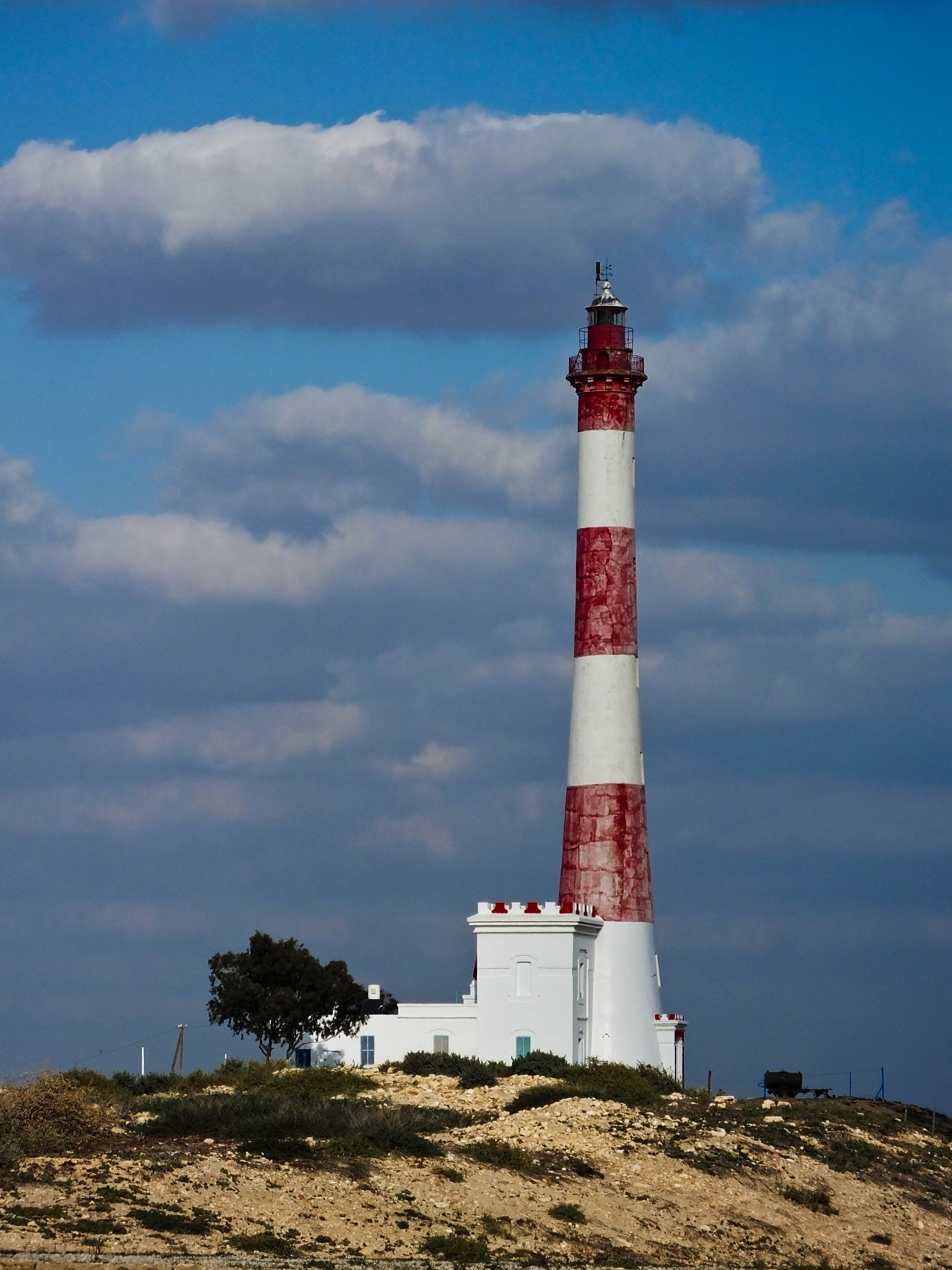
- Phare of Thyna

- Location within Tunisia
- Coordinates: 34°41′14.4″N 10°43′13.8″E
- Country: Tunisia
- Governorate: Sfax Governorate

Population (2014)
  - Total: 33,529
- Time zone: UTC+1 (CET)

Thyna, formerly Henchir-Tina, is a town and commune in the Sfax Governorate, Tunisia. As of 2004 it had a population of 26,635. It is located on the coast about 12 km (7 mi) south of Sfax.

== History ==
Thyna is located in the area of the Carthaginian city of Thenae. It is the most important archaeological site in the vicinity of Sfax. Thyna was the southernmost city in the Roman Province of Africa and became a colony under the Emperor Hadrian (117-138). Little remains on the site, but traces can be seen of Roman villas, bath-houses, an early Christian basilica, a necropolis, and tannery. The town was considered to be on the frontier between the Carthaginian territory and the Berber kingdom of Numidia. Many objects, including some of the mosaics, have been removed to the museum at Sfax. The main point of interest is the "Baths of the Months"; the mosaics here are intact but largely covered with sand. Nearby is a smaller bath house, and parts of the walls of the Roman town can still be traced. A temple has been excavated as well as some dwellings beside a Roman street.

== Geography ==
The town is traversed by the RN1 which connects Sfax to Gabès. The town has an industrial area that was built in 1999, and to the west lies the Sfax-Thyna International Airport. There are salt mines nearby extending over an area of about 1,500 hectares (3,700 acres) and producing 300,000 tonnes of salt a year. On the coast are saltmarshes which are visited by large numbers of migrating water birds.

== See also ==
- List of cities in Tunisia
