= Antonio de Hornedo Correa =

Antonio de Hornedo Correa (1915–2006) was the Spanish born bishop of Chachapoyas from 1977 to 1991.

Hornedo was born in Comillas, Spain. He joined the Society of Jesus in 1933. In 1963, he was made the prefect of San Francisco Javier, Peru. He was made the titular bishop of Castellum Minas in 1971 and the bishop of Chachapoyas in 1977.

== Sources ==
- Catholic hierarchy listing for Hornedo
