= José María Izuzquiza Herranz =

José María Izuzquiza Herranz (November 22, 1925 – April 26, 2011) was the Catholic bishop of the Apostolic Vicariate of Jaén en Peru, Peru.

Born in Madrid, Spain, Izuzquiza Herranz was ordained to the priesthood for the Society of Jesus in 1958. In 1987 he was appointed bishop retiring in 2001.
