= Ivo Baldi Gaburri =

Italian priest (1947–2021)

- Bishop of Huarí
- Church: Catholic Church
- Diocese: Diocese of Huarí
- In office: 4 February 2004 – 11 June 2021
- Predecessor: Antonio Santarsiero Rosa
- Previous post: Bishop of Huaraz (1999-2004)

Orders
- Ordination: 9 October 1971
- Consecration: 6 January 2000 by Pope John Paul II

Personal details
- Born: 27 March 1947 Città di Castello, Province of Perugia, Italy
- Died: 11 June 2021 (aged 74) Huaraz, Department of Ancash, Peru

Ivo Baldi Gaburri (27 March 1947 – 11 June 2021) was an Italian-born Peruvian Roman Catholic bishop.

== Biography ==
Baldi Gaburri was born in Città di Castello, Perugia, Italy and was ordained to the priesthood in 1971. He served as the prelate and bishop of the Roman Catholic Diocese of Huaraz, Peru, from 2000 to 2004 and as bishop of the Roman Catholic Diocese of Huarí, Peru, from 2004 until his death.

He died from COVID-19 on 11 June 2021, at age 74 in Huaraz, Ancash, Peru, during the COVID-19 pandemic in Peru.
