= Manuel Prado Perez-Rosas =

Peruvian prelate

Manuel Prado Perez-Rosas, S.J.
- Archbishop Emeritus of the Archdiocese of Trujillo
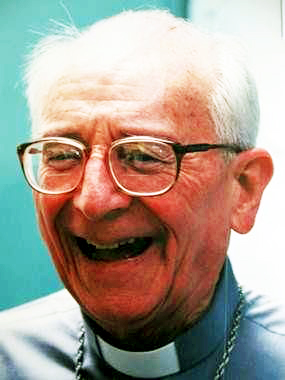
- Manuel Prado Perez-Rosas, S.J.
- Church: Roman Catholic Church
- See: Archdiocese of Trujillo
- In office: 1976–1999
- Predecessor: Manuel Prado Perez-Rosas, S.J.
- Successor: Héctor Miguel Cabrejos Vidarte, O.F.M.
- Previous post(s): Prelate

Orders
- Ordination: 13 July 1956

Personal details
- Born: 26 May 1923; Lima, Peru
- Died: 9 October 2011 (aged 88)

Manuel Prado Perez-Rosas S.J. (26 May 1923 – 9 October 2011) was a Peruvian prelate of the Catholic Church.

Perez-Rosas was born in Lima, Peru. ordained a Jesuit priest on 13 July 1956. He was appointed bishop of the Diocese of Chachapoyasl on 7 September 1970, and ordained a month later. He was later named Archbishop of the Archdiocese of Trujillo on 29 December 1976. He retired on 29 July 1999.

== See also ==
- Society of Jesus
