= José Ramón Gurruchaga Ezama =

José Ramón Gurruchaga Ezama S.D.B.
- Bishop of Lurín
- Native name: José Ramón Gurrutxaga Ezama
- Church: Catholic Church
- Diocese: Diocese of Lurín
- In office: 14 December 1996 – 17 June 2006
- Predecessor: Diocese erected
- Successor: Carlos García Camader
- Previous post: Bishop of Huaraz (1987-1996)

Orders
- Ordination: 11 February 1961
- Consecration: 28 February 1987 by Luigi Dossena

Personal details
- Born: 29 March 1931 Barakaldo, Biscay, Kingdom of Spain
- Died: 11 April 2017 (aged 86) Lima, Peru
- Motto: Fiat Voluntas Dei

José Ramón Gurruchaga Ezama (29 March 1931, Barakaldo – 11 April 2017, Lima) was a Roman Catholic bishop.

Ordained to the priesthood in 1961, Gurruchaga Ezama served as bishop of the Diocese of Huaraz, Peru, from 1987 to 1996. He then served as bishop of the Diocese of Lurin from 1996 to 2006.
