= Roman Catholic Archdiocese of Trujillo =

Roman Catholic archdiocese in Peru

Coordinates: 8.1107°S 79.0283°W

Archdiocese of Trujillo Archidioecesis Truxillensis

Catholic
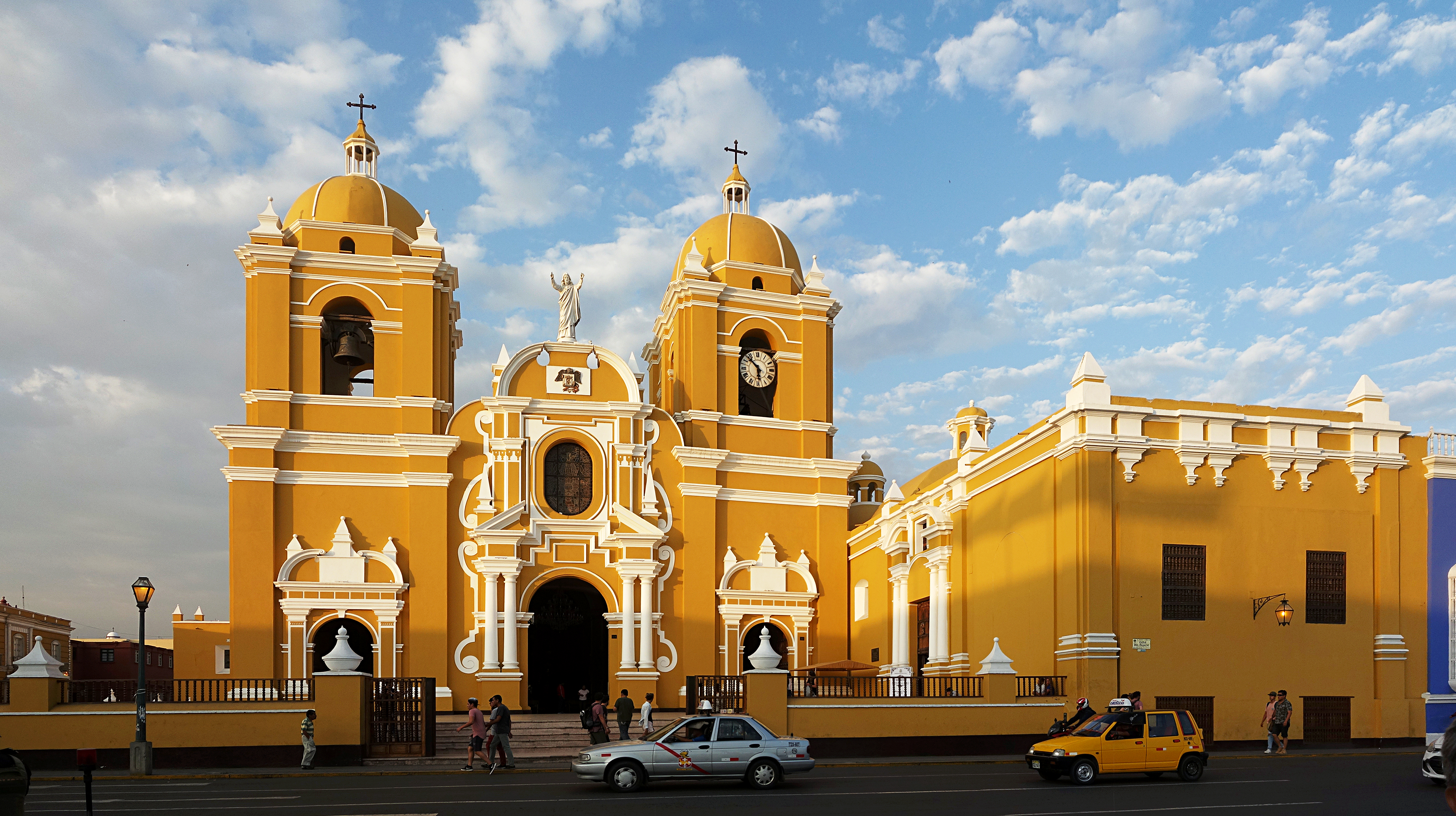
- Cathedral Basilica of Saint Mary

Location
- Country: Peru

Statistics
- Area: 15,568 km^{2} (6,011 sq mi)
- Population: Total; Catholics: (as of 2022); 1,645,062; 1,150,354 (69.9%)
- Parishes: 76

Information
- Rite: Latin Rite
- Cathedral: Cathedral Basilica of Santa María

Current leadership
- Pope: Pope Leo XIV
- Metropolitan Archbishop: Gilberto Alfredo Vizcarra Mori, S.J.
- Auxiliary Bishops: Timoteo Solórzano Rojas, M.S.C. Francisco Castro Lalupú

Map

The Roman Catholic Archdiocese of Trujillo (Latin: Truxillen(sis)) is an archdiocese located in the city of Trujillo in Peru.

== History ==
On 15 April 1577, the Diocese of Trujillo was erected by the bull Illius fulciti praesidio of Pope Gregory XIII, taking its territory from the Archdiocese of Lima, of which it was originally a suffragan. In the communication dated 23 August 1761 by José Antonio Manso de Velasco — the Viceroy of Peru — to his successor, he indicated that the Diocese of Trujillo had 79,114 people in the 7 provinces that then comprised it: Trujillo, Saña, Piura, Caxamarquilla (or Pataz), Caxamarca, Luya and Chillaos, Chachapoyas. The bishopric also included the governorate of Jaén de Bracamoros, belonging to the Real Audiencia of Quito in the Viceroyalty of New Granada.

On 28 May 1803, the Diocese of Trujillo ceded a portion of its territory for the erection of the Diocese of Maynas (the Diocese of Chachapoyas today).

On 5 April 1908 and 29 February 1940, the Diocese of Trujillo ceded other portions of territory for the erection of the Diocese of Cajamarca and the Diocese of Piura (the Archdiocese of Piura today), respectively.

On 23 May 1943, the Diocese of Trujillo was elevated to the rank of metropolitan archdiocese with the bull Inter praecipuas of Pope Pius XII.

On 17 December 1956 and 4 December 1961, the Archdiocese of Trujillo ceded further portions of territory for the purpose of establishing the Diocese of Chiclayo and the Territorial Prelature of Huamachuco, respectively.

== Ordinaries ==
=== Diocese of Trujillo ===
Erected: 15 April 1577

- Alonso Guzmán y Talavera, O.S.H. (15 Apr 1577 Appointed – )
- Francisco de Ovanda, O.F.M. (15 Apr 1577 Appointed – )
- Jeronimo de Carcamo (25 May 1611 – 1614 Died)
- Francisco Diaz de Cabrera y Córdoba, O.P. (6 Oct 1614 – 26 Apr 1620 Died)
- Carlos Marcelo Corni Velazquez (17 Aug 1620 – 16 Oct 1630 Died)
- Ambrosio Vallejo Mejía, O. Carm. (10 Feb 1631 – 29 Oct 1635 Died)
- Diego Montoya Mendoza (5 Oct 1637 – 14 Apr 1640 Died)
- Luis Córdoba Ronquillo, O.SS.T. (13 Aug 1640 – 24 Nov 1640 Died)
- Pedro de Ortega y Sotomayor (21 Aug 1645 – 26 Dec 1647 Appointed, Bishop of Arequipa)
- Andrés García de Zurita (4 Apr 1650 – 2 Aug 1652 Died)
- Diego del Castillo y Arteaga (9 Mar 1654 – 25 Feb 1658 Confirmed, Bishop of Badajoz)
- Francisco de Godoy (1 Sep 1659 – Dec 1659 Died)
- Juan de la Calle y Heredia, O. de M. (5 Sep 1661 – 1 Oct 1674 Appointed, Bishop of Arequipa)
- Alvarus de Ibarra (17 Dec 1674 Confirmed – )
- Antonio de León y Becerra (19 Oct 1676 – 14 Jun 1677 Appointed, Bishop of Arequipa)
- Francisco de Borja (bishop) (4 Sep 1679 – 13 Apr 1689 Died)
- Pedro de La Serena, O.S.H. (28 Sep 1693 – Sep 1695 Died)
- Pedro Díaz de Cienfuegos (20 Feb 1696 – 9 Jan 1702 Died)
- Juan Víctores de Velasco, O.S.B. (28 Nov 1707 – 10 Dec 1713 Died)
- Diego Montero del Aguila (21 Jan 1715 – 25 Feb 1718 Died)
- Jaime de Mimbela, O.P. (20 Mar 1720 – 4 Aug 1739 Died)
- Gregorio de Molleda y Clerque (19 Dec 1740 – 4 Sep 1747 Confirmed, Archbishop of La Plata o Charcas)
- José Cayetano Paravicino, O.F.M. (4 Sep 1747 – 20 Oct 1750 Died)
- Bernardo de Arbizu y Ugarte (15 Nov 1751 – 20 Oct 1756 Died)
- Cayetano Marcellano y Agramont (23 May 1757 – 13 Mar 1758 Appointed, Archbishop of La Plata o Charcas)
- Francisco Javier de Luna Victoria y Castro (13 Mar 1758 – 11 Mar 1777 Died)
- Baltasar Jaime Martínez Compañón (1 Jun 1778 – 15 Dec 1788 Appointed, Archbishop of Santafé en Nueva Granada)
- José Andrés de Achurra y Núñez del Arco (15 Dec 1788 – 1793 Died)
- Blas Manuel Sobrino y Minayo (12 Sep 1794 – 26 Apr 1796 Died)
- José Carrión y Marfil (3 Jul 1798 – 24 Jan 1825 Retired)
- Tomás Diéguez y Florencia (24 Jul 1835 – 8 Jun 1845 Died)
- José Higinio Madalengoitia y Sanz de Zárate (19 Jan 1846 – 4 Nov 1848 Died)
- Agustín Guillermo Charún Espinoza (7 Mar 1853 – 22 Feb 1857 Died)
- Francisco de Asis Orueta y Castrillón, C.O. (26 Sep 1859 – 21 Mar 1873 Appointed, Archbishop of Lima)
- José Domingo Armestar Espinoza de los Monteros (21 Dec 1874 – 14 Dec 1881 Died)
- Manuel Santiago Medina y Bañon (14 Feb 1889 – 22 Mar 1907 Died)
- Carlos Garcia Irigoyen (21 Mar 1910 – 21 Oct 1937 Died)
- Juan Gualberto Guevara y de la Cuba (15 Dec 1940 – 23 May 1943 Elevated to the rank of archbishop)

=== Archdiocese of Trujillo ===
Elevated: 23 May 1943

- Juan Gualberto Guevara y de la Cuba (23 May 1943 – 16 December 1945 Appointed, Archbishop of Lima)
- Aurelio Macedonio Guerrero (20 September 1946 – 25 May 1957 Retired)
- Federico Pérez Silva, C.M. (15 June 1957 – 16 October 1965 Died)
- Carlos Maria Jurgens Byrne, C.SS.R. (6 December 1965 – 29 December 1976 Resigned)
- Manuel Prado Perez-Rosas, S.J. (29 December 1976 – 29 July 1999 Retired)
- Héctor Miguel Cabrejos Vidarte, O.F.M. (29 July 1999 Appointed – 11 February 2025 Retired)
- Gilberto Alfredo Vizcarra Mori, S.J. (11 February 2025 – present)

== Other affiliated bishops ==
=== Auxiliary bishops ===
- José Higinio Madalengoitia y Sanz de Zárate (1840-1846), appointed Bishop here
- Alfonso Zaplana Bellizza (1952-1957), appointed Bishop of Tacna
- Luis Baldo Riva, C.SS.R. (1969-1977), appointed Prelate of Chuquibamba
- Tarcisio Pusma Ibáñez (2008), did not take effect
- José Javier Travieso Martín, C.M.F. (2009-2014), appointed Vicar Apostolic of San José del Amazonas
- Timoteo Solórzano Rojas, M.S.C. (2018-)
- Francisco Castro Lalupú (2020-)

=== Other priest of this diocese who became bishop ===
- Francisco de Paola Grozo, appointed Bishop of Cajamarca in 1910

== Suffragan dioceses ==
- Diocese of Cajamarca
- Diocese of Chimbote
- Territorial Prelature of Huamachuco
- Diocese of Huaraz
- Diocese of Huarí
- Territorial Prelature of Moyobamba

== See also ==
- Virgin of La Puerta
- Roman Catholicism in Peru

== Sources ==
- GCatholic.org
- Catholic Hierarchy
