= Antonio Ruiz de Montoya University =

Private university in Lima, Peru

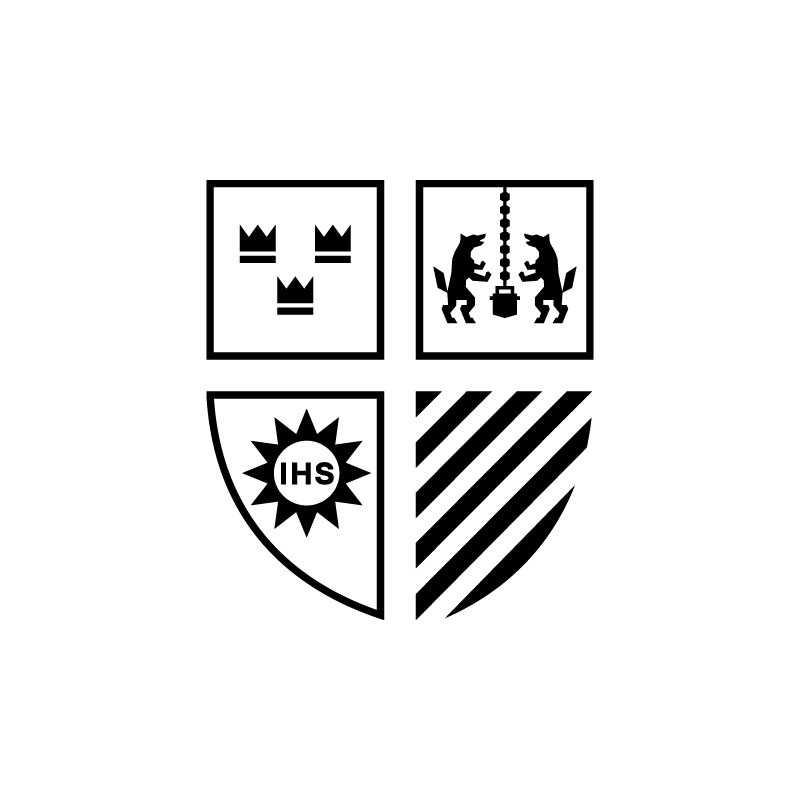
- Motto: The glory of God is the fully alive human person. Gloria Dei Vivens Homo
- Established: 2003; 23 years ago
- Religious affiliation: Jesuit, Catholic
- Academic affiliations: AUSJAL
- Rector: Pbro. Dr. Rafael Fernández Hart SJ
- Location: Av. Paso de los Andes 970, Pueblo Libre, Lima, Peru
- Predecessor: School of Pedagogy, Philosophy, and Literature Antonio Ruiz de Montoya
- Website: Antonio Ruiz de Montoya University

Antonio Ruiz de Montoya University (Universidad Antonio Ruiz de Montoya – UARM) is a private, non-profit university located in the city of Lima, Peru, in the district of Pueblo Libre. It was founded by the Society of Jesus on 4 July 2003. It incorporated the School of Pedagogy, Philosophy, and Literature Antonio Ruiz de Montoya which had been founded in 1991.

== Academics ==
Antonio Ruiz de Montoya University offers the following programs of undergraduate and graduate study:

Faculty of Humanities

- Secondary Education majoring in philosophy and historical social sciences
- Primary school majoring in language and literature
- Philosophy
- Psychology
- Journalism

Faculty of Social Sciences

- Sustainable tourism
- Political science
- Law
- Economy majoring in public and environmental management.

School of Engineering and Management

- Administration
- Industrial engineering

== See also ==
- Education in Peru
- List of Jesuit sites
- List of universities in Peru
