= Diocese of Chachapoyas =

Roman Catholic diocese in Peru

Coordinates: 6.2300°S 77.8726°W

Diocese of Chachapoyas Dioecesis Chachapoyasensis

Catholic

Location
- Country: Peru
- Metropolitan: Piura

Statistics
- Area: 21,659 km^{2} (8,363 sq mi)
- Population: Total; Catholics: (as of 2006); 343,000; 311,000 (90.7%)

Information
- Rite: Latin Rite

Current leadership
- Pope: Leo XIV
- Bishop: Humberto Tapia Díaz
- Bishops emeritus: José Ignacio Alemany Grau

Map

The Roman Catholic Diocese of Chachapoyas (Latin: Chachapoyasen(sis)) is a diocese located in the city of Chachapoyas in the ecclesiastical province of Piura in Peru.

== History ==
- 28 May 1803: Established as Diocese of Maynas from the Diocese of Cuenca in Ecuador, Metropolitan Archdiocese of Lima and Diocese of Trujillo
- 2 June 1843: Renamed as Diocese of Chachapoyas

== Bishops ==
=== Ordinaries, in reverse chronological order ===
- Bishops of Chachapoyas (Roman rite), below
  - Bishop Humberto Tapia Díaz (2022.03.09 – ...)
  - Bishop Emiliano Antonio Cisneros Martínez, O.A.R. (2002.03.27 – 2022.03.09)
  - Bishop José Ignacio Alemany Grau, C.SS.R. (1995.08.17 – 2000.05.18)
  - Bishop Ángel Francisco Simón Piorno (1991.05.18 – 1995.03.18), appointed Bishop of Cajamarca
  - Bishop Antonio de Hornedo Correa, S.J. (1977.07.09 – 1991.05.18)
  - Bishop Manuel Prado Perez-Rosas, S.J. (1970.09.07 – 1976.12.29), appointed Archbishop of Trujillo
  - Bishop José Germán Benavides Morriberón (1958.08.28 – 1968.11.30)
  - Bishop Ottavio Ortiz Arrieta, S.D.B. (1921.11.21 – 1958.03.01)
  - Bishop Emilio Francisco Lisson Chaves, C.M. (1909.03.16 – 1918.02.25), appointed Archbishop of Lima
  - Bishop José Santiago Irala, O.F.M. (1904.06.04 – 1909)
  - Bishop Francesco Solano del Rísco, O.F.M. (1865.03.27 – 1905)
  - Bishop Pedro Ruiz (1853–1863)
- Bishops of Maynas (Roman rite), below
  - Bishop José María Arriaga (1838–1849)
  - Bishop Hipólito Antonio Sánchez Rangel de Fayas, O.F.M. (1805.06.26 – 1824.09.28), appointed Apostolic Administrator of Cartagena (en España)

=== Auxiliary bishop ===
- Otoniel Alcedo Culquicóndor, S.D.B. (1953-1958), appointed Bishop of Ayacucho o Huamanga (Guamanga)

== See also ==
- Roman Catholicism in Peru

== Sources ==
- GCatholic.org
- Catholic Hierarchy
