= Gilberto Alfredo Vizcarra Mori =

Peruvian Roman Catholic archbishop (born 1960)

His Excellency, The Most Reverend Gilberto Alfredo Vizcarra Mori S.J.
- Archbishop of Trujillo
- Church: Catholic Church
- Archdiocese: Trujillo
- Appointed: 11 February 2025
- Installed: 22 February 2025
- Predecessor: Héctor Miguel Cabrejos Vidarte
- Previous posts: Apostolic Vicar of Jaén and Titular Bishop of Autenti (2014–2025)

Orders
- Ordination: 31 July 1994
- Consecration: 15 August 2014 by Pedro Ricardo Barreto Jimeno

Personal details
- Born: 11 February 1960 (age 66) Lima, Peru
- Education: Faculty of Pontifical and Civil Theology of Lima; National University of San Marcos; Pontifical Catholic University of Chile; Jesuit Faculty of Theology, Belo Horizonte; Pontifical Institute for Arabic and Islamic Studies
- Motto: Jesús Cristo, Hijo De Dios Salvador
- Coat of arms

Gilberto Alfredo Vizcarra Mori, S.J. (born 11 February 1960) is a Peruvian Roman Catholic prelate and member of the Society of Jesus. He has served as the Archbishop of Trujillo since February 2025. He previously served as Apostolic Vicar of Jaén en Perú o San Francisco Javier from 2014 to 2025 and as titular bishop of Autenti.

== Early life and education ==
Vizcarra was born in Lima, Peru, on 11 February 1960. He attended La Salle school in Lima and subsequently studied at the Faculty of Pontifical and Civil Theology of Lima from 1977 to 1979. From 1980 to 1981 he studied civil law at the National University of San Marcos.

He entered the Society of Jesus novitiate in 1982. He studied philosophy at the Pontifical Catholic University of Chile from 1985 to 1987 and theology at the Jesuit Faculty of Theology in Belo Horizonte, Brazil, from 1991 to 1994. He later obtained a licentiate in Arabic in Cairo, Egypt, from 1994 to 1996, and studied at the Pontifical Institute for Arabic and Islamic Studies in Rome from 2001 to 2003. He made his perpetual profession in the Society of Jesus on 15 August 2001.

== Priesthood ==
Vizcarra was ordained a priest on 31 July 1994. After his ordination, he undertook further studies in Arabic and served in pastoral and missionary positions.

From 1997 to 1998, he assisted with Jesuit vocations ministry in Lima. He served as parish priest of San Pedro y San Pablo in Bitkine, in the Apostolic Vicariate of Mongo in Chad, from 1997 to 2000. From 2003 to 2011, he was parish priest of San Ignacio in the Vicariate of Mongo and served as superior of his Jesuit community in 2005. Between 2007 and 2011 he founded and directed a Fe y Alegría project in Chad. He later served as parochial vicar of Santa Teresa del Niño Jesús in Abéché from 2012 to 2013 and as spiritual director at Colegio de la Inmaculada in Lima from 2013 to 2014.

His missionary ministry in Chad formed a significant part of his priestly career. According to the CELAM news service, he spent many years in African pastoral contexts before returning to Peru for episcopal ministry.

== Episcopate ==
=== Apostolic Vicar of Jaén ===
On 11 June 2014, Pope Francis appointed Vizcarra Apostolic Vicar of Jaén en Perú o San Francisco Javier and titular bishop of Autenti. At the time of his appointment, he was serving as a missionary in the Apostolic Vicariate of Mongo in Chad. He received his episcopal consecration on 15 August 2014, with Pedro Ricardo Barreto Jimeno, S.J., Archbishop of Huancayo, as principal consecrator.

During his tenure in Jaén, Vizcarra continued to be associated with missionary pastoral work. In the Peruvian episcopate, he was elected president of the Episcopal Commission for Laity and Youth for the 2018–2022 period and was re-elected for 2022–2025.

=== Archbishop of Trujillo ===
On 11 February 2025, Pope Francis appointed Vizcarra Metropolitan Archbishop of Trujillo, transferring him from the titular see of Autenti and the Apostolic Vicariate of Jaén. He succeeded Héctor Miguel Cabrejos Vidarte, whose resignation was accepted by the pope.

Vizcarra took possession of the Archdiocese of Trujillo on 22 February 2025. In an interview shortly after his appointment, he described his new assignment as a change from his predominantly missionary experience and emphasized his intention to become familiar with the archdiocese through dialogue and visits to its communities.

On 30 June 2025, Pope Leo XIV presented Vizcarra with the pallium during a solemn Mass in the Vatican.

Vizcarra also served concurrently as apostolic administrator of the Apostolic Vicariate of Jaén from his appointment as Archbishop of Trujillo until 30 August 2026.
