= List of Catholic dioceses in Peru =

The Catholic Church in Peru comprises seven ecclesiastical provinces each headed by an archbishop. The provinces are in turn subdivided into 19 dioceses and seven archdioceses each headed by a bishop or an archbishop. There are also 10 territorial prelatures, 8 apostolic vicariates and one Military Ordinariate in Peru.

== List of Dioceses ==
=== Ecclesiastical province of Arequipa ===
- Archdiocese of Arequipa
  - Diocese of Puno
  - Diocese of Tacna y Moquegua
  - Prelature of Ayaviri
  - Prelature of Chuquibamba
  - Prelature of Juli

=== Ecclesiastical province of Ayacucho ===
- Archdiocese of Ayacucho
  - Diocese of Huancavélica
  - Prelature of Caravelí

=== Ecclesiastical province of Cuzco ===
- Archdiocese of Cuzco
  - Diocese of Abancay
  - Prelature of Chuquibambilla
  - Diocese of Sicuani

=== Ecclesiastical province of Huancayo ===
- Archdiocese of Huancayo
  - Diocese of Huánuco
  - Diocese of Tarma

=== Ecclesiastical province of Lima ===
- Archdiocese of Lima
  - Diocese of Callao
  - Diocese of Carabayllo
  - Diocese of Chosica
  - Diocese of Huacho
  - Diocese of Ica
  - Diocese of Lurín
  - Prelature of Yauyos

=== Ecclesiastical province of Piura ===
- Archdiocese of Piura
  - Diocese of Chachapoyas
  - Diocese of Chiclayo
  - Diocese of Chulucanas
  - Prelature of Chota

=== Ecclesiastical province of Trujillo ===
- Archdiocese of Trujillo
  - Diocese of Cajamarca
  - Diocese of Chimbote
  - Diocese of Huaraz
  - Diocese of Huarí
  - Prelature of Huamachuco
  - Prelature of Moyobamba

=== Vicariates ===
- Vicariate Apostolic of Iquitos
- Vicariate Apostolic of Jaén en Peru o San Francisco Javier
- Vicariate Apostolic of Pucallpa
- Vicariate Apostolic of Puerto Maldonado
- Vicariate Apostolic of Requena
- Vicariate Apostolic of San José de Amazonas
- Vicariate Apostolic of San Ramón
- Vicariate Apostolic of Yurimaguas

=== Military Ordinariate ===
- Military Ordinariate of Peru

== Defunct Circumscription ==
- Apostolic Vicariate of Ucayali

== Gallery of Archdioceses ==
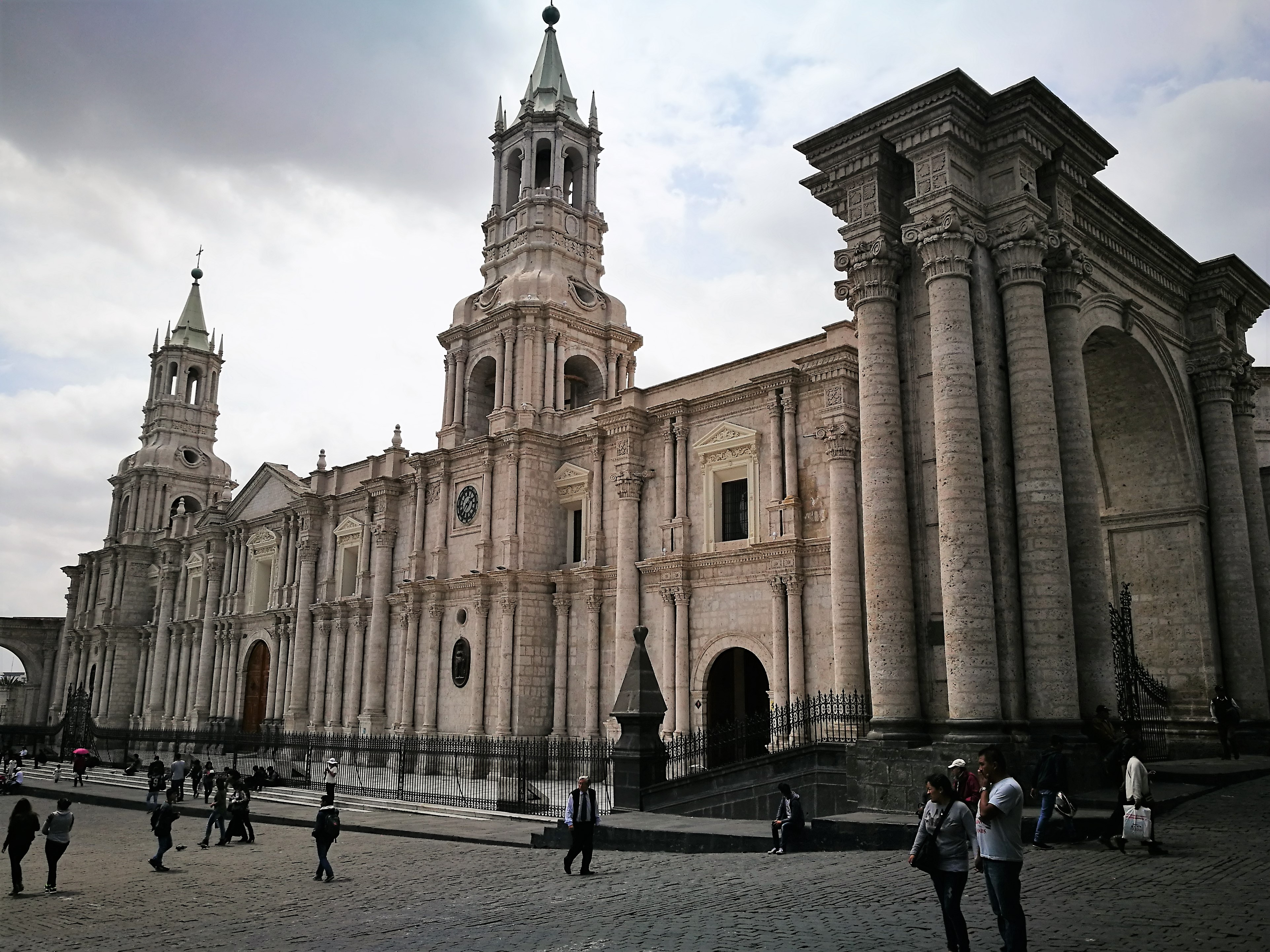
The seat of the Archdiocese of Arequipa is Catedral Basílica Santa María.

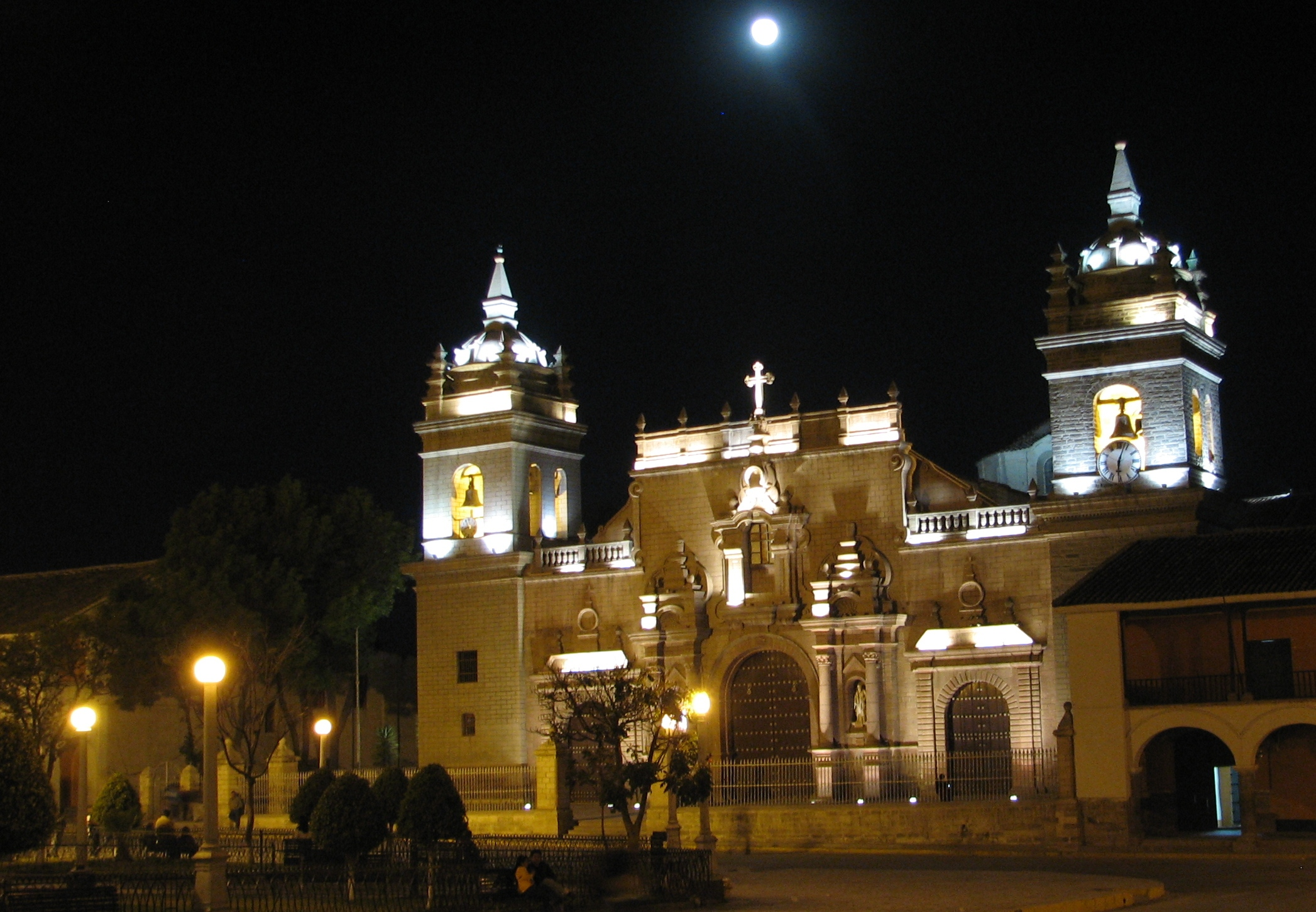
The seat of the Archdiocese of Ayacucho is Catedral Basílica Santa María.

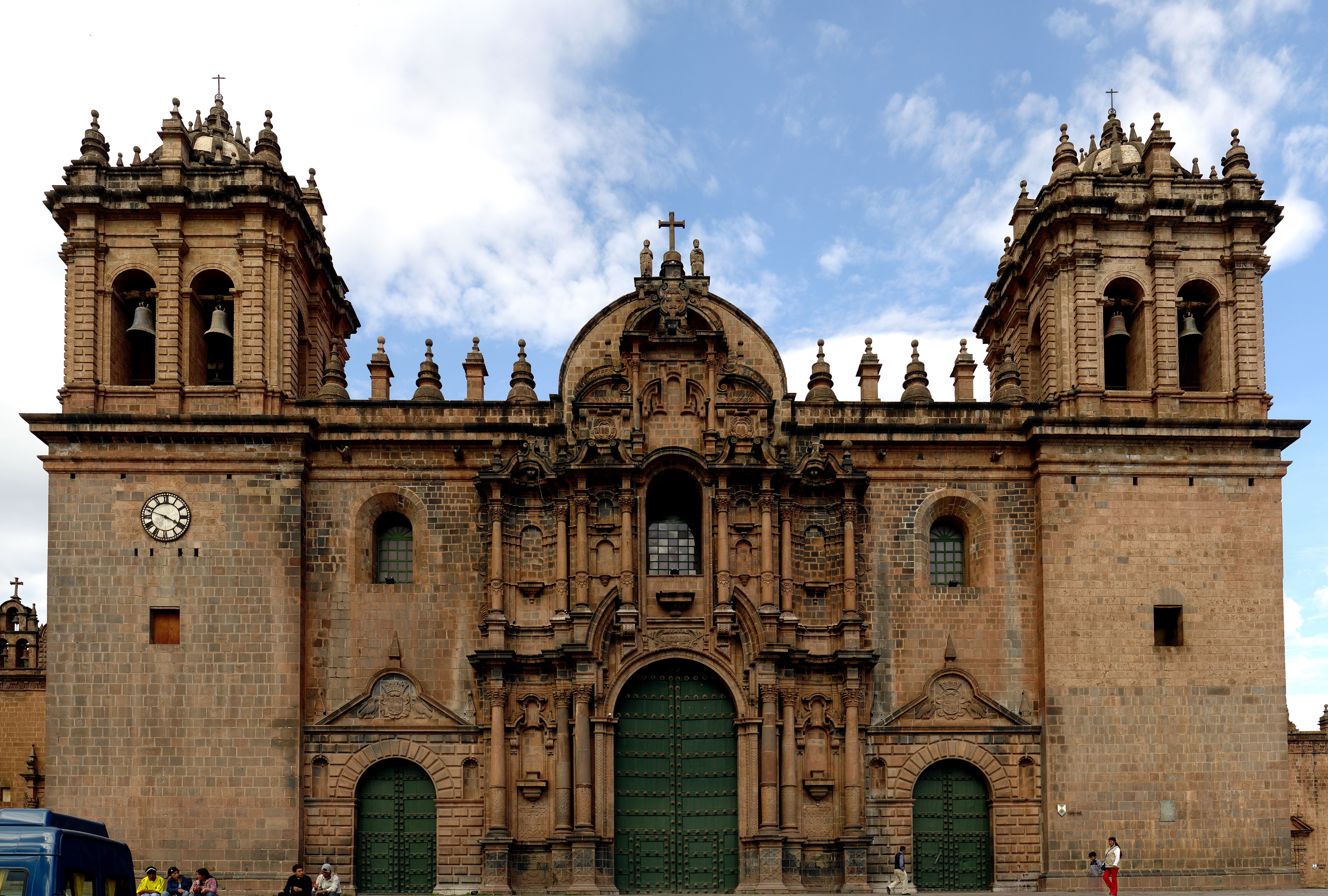
The seat of the Archdiocese of Cusco is Catedral Basílica de la Virgen de la Asunción.

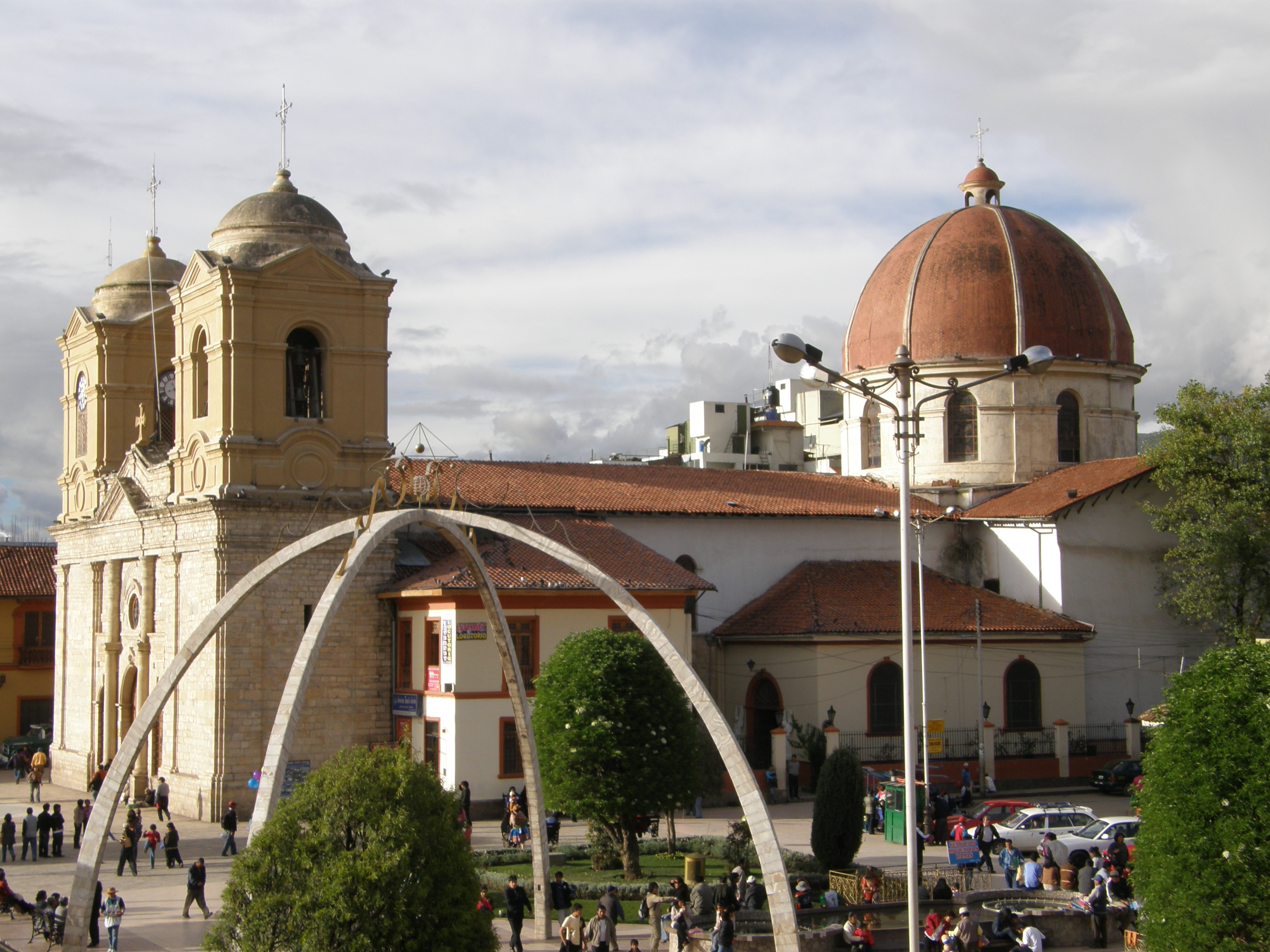
The seat of the Archdiocese of Huancayo is Catedral de la Santísima Trinidad.

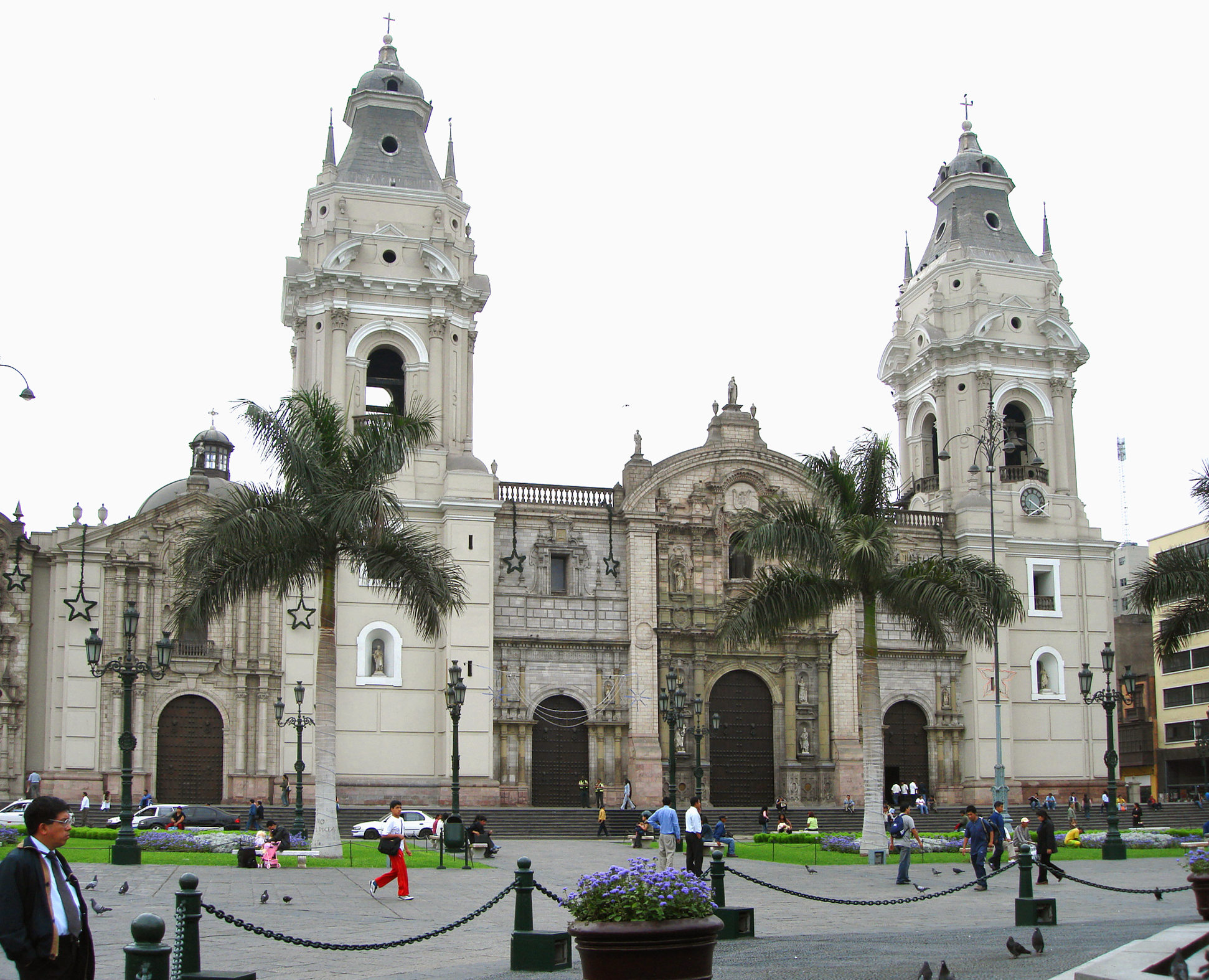
The seat of the Archdiocese of Lima is Catedral Basílica San Juan Apóstol y Evangelista.

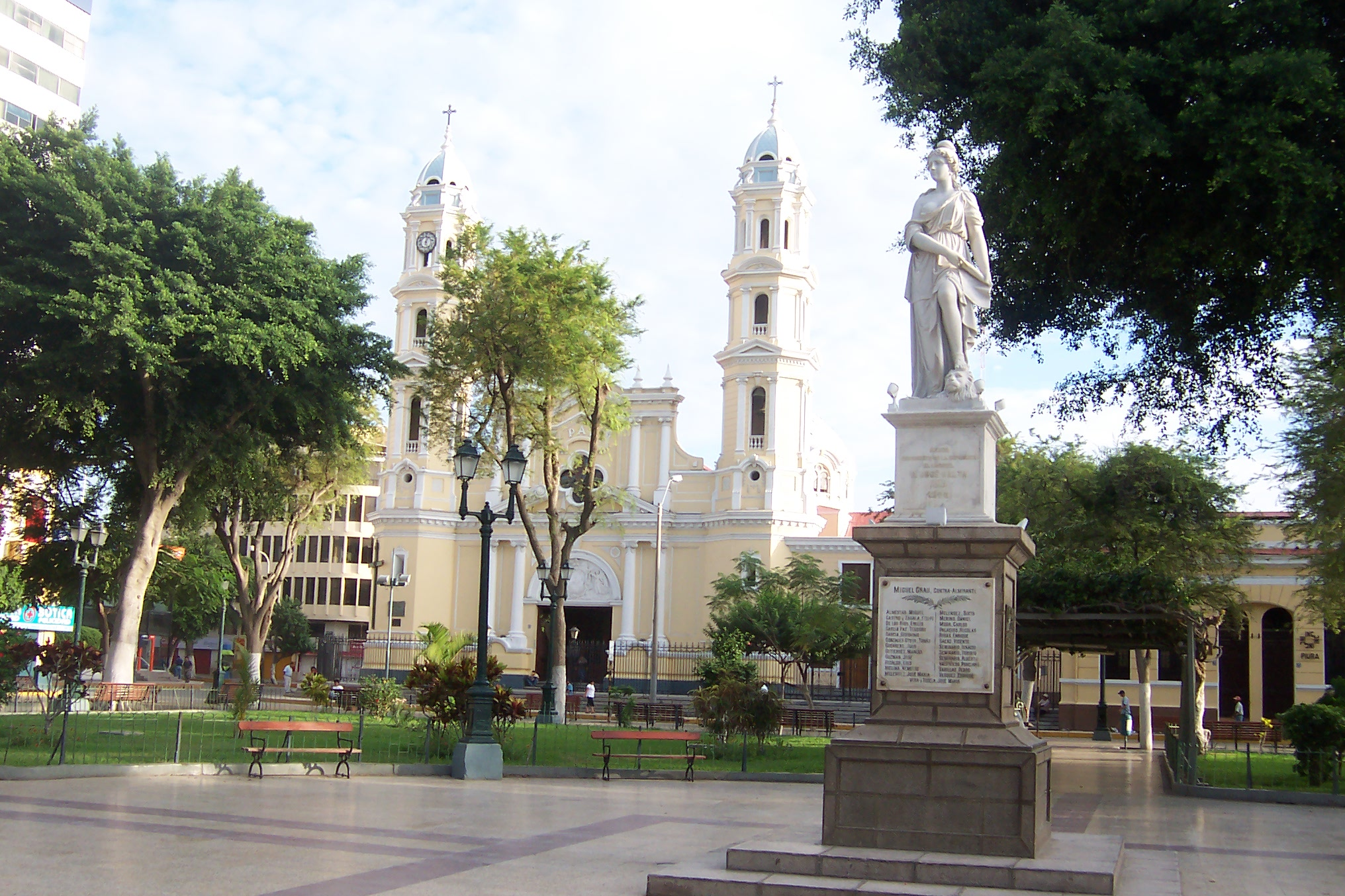
The seat of the Archdiocese of Piura is Catedral de San Miguel Arcángel.

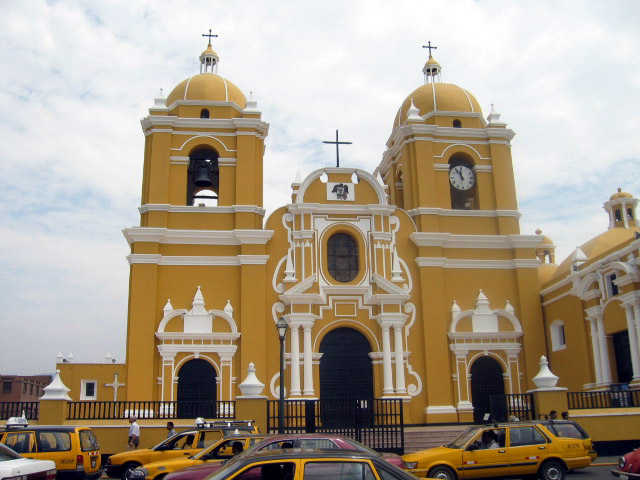
The seat of the Archdiocese of Trujillo is Catedral Basílica Santa María.
