= Catholic Church in Peru =

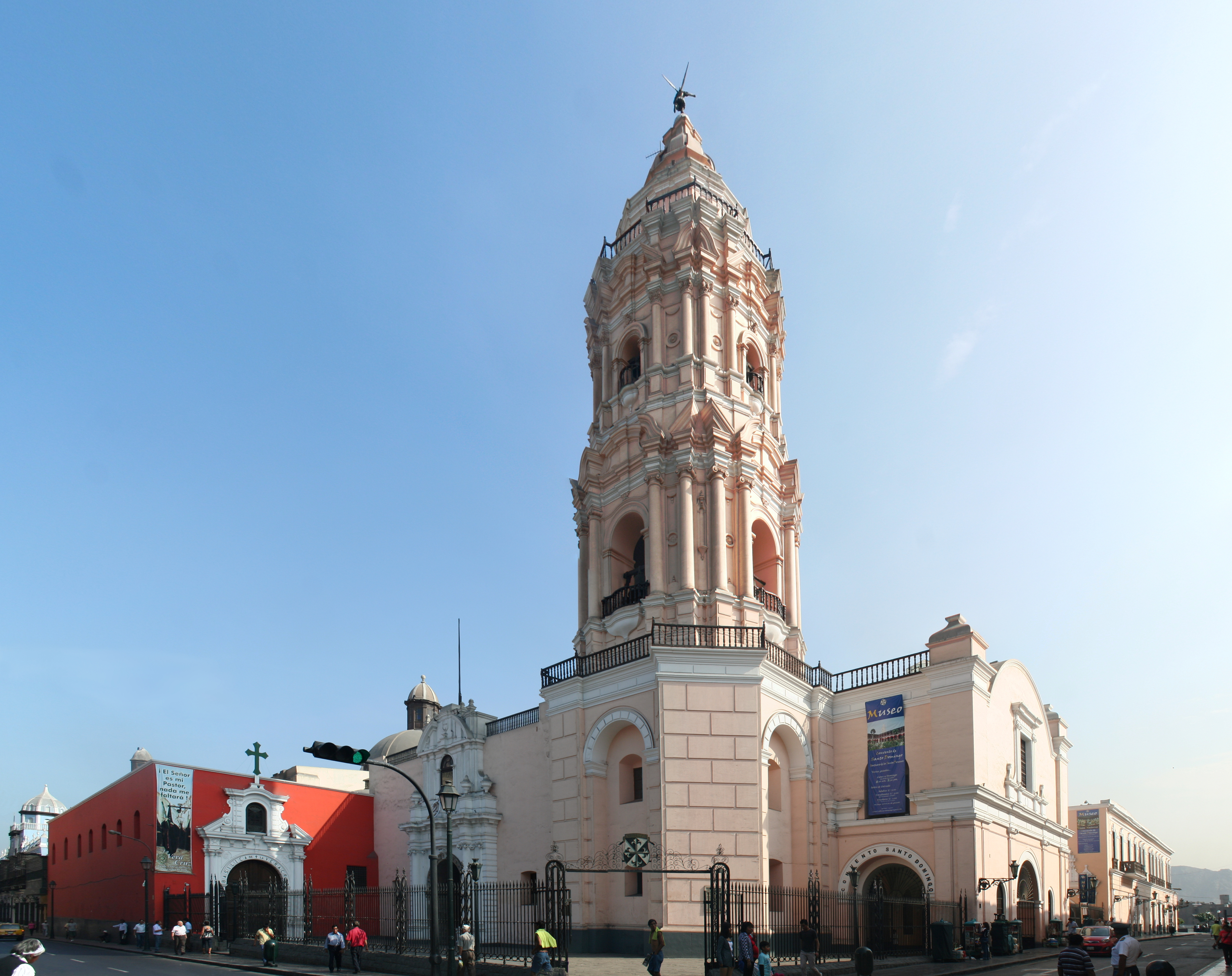
The Basilica and Convent of Santo Domingo in Lima, Peru

The Catholic Church in Peru is part of the worldwide Catholic Church, under the spiritual leadership of the pope, the curia in Rome, and the Peruvian Episcopal Conference.

Catholics compose an estimated 76% of Peru's population, according to the 2017 census. In 2020, there were over 3,000 priests and over 9,000 nuns serving across 1,670 parishes; the church also ran 136 hospitals and homes for the old and infirm.

The Holy See and the government of Peru concluded a pact regulating their relations and certain aspects of the Church's status in Peru on 26 July 1980.

Peru has produced two famous saints, St. Rose of Lima and St. Martin de Porres, as well as two Blesseds, Ana de los Ángeles (Ana Monteagudo Ponce de León) and Antonia Luzmila Rivas López (María Agustina).

In the 2025 conclave, Robert Prevost was elected, taking his papal name of Pope Leo XIV, the Pope is American but migrated to Peru in 1985 and who also spent most of his career as a missionary in Peru.

== Demographics ==
Catholicism has been decreasing for many decades. According to the different census, in 1940, 98.5% of the Peruvian population adhered to Catholicism, decreasing to 94.6% in 1981 and to 81.3% in 2007.

Year	Percent	Decrease
1940	98.5%	-
1961	97.3%	-1.2%
1972	96.4%	-0.9%
1981	94.6%	-1.8%
1993	89.0%	-5.6%
2007	81.3%	-7.7%
2017	76.0%	-5.3%

== Dioceses ==
The Peruvian Catholic Church is divided into dioceses and archdioceses:

=== Province of Arequipa ===
- Archdiocese of Arequipa
- Diocese of Puno
- Diocese of Tacna
- Prelature of Ayaviri
- Prelature of Chuquibamba
- Prelature of Juli
- Prelature of Santiago Apóstol de Huancané

=== Province of Ayacucho ===
- Archdiocese of Ayacucho
- Diocese of Huancavelica
- Prelature of Caraveli

=== Province of Cusco ===
- Archdiocese of Cusco
- Diocese of Abancay
- Prelature of Chiquibambilla
- Diocese of Sicuani

=== Province of Huancayo ===
- Archdiocese of Huancayo
- Diocese of Huánuco
- Diocese of Tarma

=== Province of Lima ===
- Archdiocese of Lima
- Diocese of Callao
- Diocese of Carabayllo
- Diocese of Chosica
- Diocese of Huacho
- Diocese of Ica
- Diocese of Lurín
- Prelature of Yauyos

=== Province of Piura ===
- Archdiocese of Piura
- Diocese of Chiclayo
- Diocese of Chachapoyas
- Diocese of Chulucanas
- Prelature de Chota

=== Province of Trujillo ===
- Archdiocese of Trujillo
- Diocese of Cajamarca
- Diocese of Chimbote
- Diocese of Huaraz
- Diocese of Huari
- Prelature of Moyobamba
- Prelature of Huamachuco

=== Apostolic Vicariates ===
- Apostolic Vicariate of San José de Amazonas
- Apostolic Vicariate of Iquitos
- Apostolic Vicariate of Jaén in Peru or Saint Francis Xavier
- Apostolic Vicariate of Puerto Maldonado
- Apostolic Vicariate of Pucallpa
- Apostolic Vicariate of Requena
- Apostolic Vicariate of San Ramón
- Apostolic Vicariate of Yurimaguas

=== Military Ordinariate ===
- Military Ordinariate of Peru

== See also ==
- es:Extirpación de idolatrías (Eradication of idolatries)
- Peruvian_Inquisition
- Pan-Amazonian Ecclesial Network (REPAM)
- Religion in Peru
