= Francisco Castro Lalupú =

Peruvian Roman Catholic prelate

Most Reverend Francisco Castro Lalupú
- Bishop prelate of Territorial Prelature of Caravelí
- Church: Roman Catholic Church
- Appointed: 25 May 2026
- Other posts: Titular Bishop of Putia in Byzacena, Auxiliary Bishop of Trujillo

Orders
- Ordination: 6 June 2004
- Consecration: 29 September 2020 by Héctor Miguel Cabrejos Vidarte

Personal details
- Born: Francisco Castro Lalupú; 13 August 1973 (age 53) Bellavista District, Sullana Province, Peru
- Education: Pontifical Athenaeum Regina Apostolorum

Bishop Francisco Castro Lalupú (born 13 August 1973) is a Peruvian Roman Catholic bishop as the prelate Territorial Prelature of Caravelí since 25 May 2026.

== Education ==
Bishop Castro Lalupú was born in the Bellavista District, Sullana of the Archdiocese of Piura. After graduation of the school education, he began his priestly formation, first at the San Juan María Vianney Major Seminary of the Archdiocese of Piura and later at the San Carlos and San Marcelo Major Seminary of the Archdiocese of Trujillo, which he continued at the Pontifical Athenaeum Regina Apostolorum in Rome, Italy, and concluded with a Bachelor of Theology degree and was ordained as priest on June 6, 2004, for the Archdiocese of Trujillo.

== Pastoral and educational work ==
After returning to Peru in 2004, he served as a parochial administrator of the Santiago Apostole parish in Trujillo and a year later he was appointed as a parochial administrator of the parish Saint Joseph. From 2006 to 2010 he was pastor of Saint Toribio of Mogrovejo; and from 2015 to 2018 he was responsible for the chapel of St. Anna. From 2018 to 2020 he served as a parochial vicar of Saint Toribio of Mogrovejo, in the St. Mary Cathedral Basilica of Trujillo.

During the period 2006–2008 he was a counselor in the Department of Family; from 2007 to 2009 he served as an auxiliary administrator of the Archdiocese of Trujillo; and in that same period he was a professor at the Major Seminary San Carlos and San Marcelo in Trujillo. From 2009 to 2016 he was administrator of the Archdiocese of Trujillo; and in the period from 2011 until 2014 he worked as a counselor in the Department of Pastoral Ministry for Acolytes; and from 2016 to 2020 he served as an Episcopal Vicar for Economic and Administrative Affairs of the Archdiocese of Trujillo.

== Prelate ==
On April 4, 2020, he was appointed by the Pope Francis as the second Auxiliary Bishop of the Archdiocese of Trujillo, Peru and Titular Bishop of Putia in Byzacena. On September 29, 2020, he was consecrated as bishop by Metropolitan Archbishop Héctor Miguel Cabrejos Vidarte and other prelates of the Roman Catholic Church.

Catholic Church titles
Preceded by Jaime Cristóbal Abril González	Titular Bishop of Putia in Byzacena; 2020–2026	Succeeded by Incumbent
