= Juan Falcón =

Juan Falcón may refer to:

- Juan Antonio Falcón (1838–1909), Peruvian Roman Catholic Bishop of Cusco
- Juan Crisóstomo Falcón (1820–1870), President of Venezuela
  - Juan Crisóstomo Falcón National Park, Venezuelan national park
- Juan José Falcón Sanabria (born 1936), Spanish conductor and composer
- Juan Falcón (actor) (born 1965), Chilean-Cuban actor
- Juan Carlos Falcón (born 1979), Argentine football midfielder
- Juan Falcón (footballer) (born 1989), Venezuelan football striker
