= Diocese of San Jose =

Diocese of San Jose may refer to:

- Roman Catholic Archdiocese of San José de Costa Rica
- Roman Catholic Diocese of San José del Guaviare (Colombia)
- Roman Catholic Diocese of San Jose de Antique (Philippines)
- Roman Catholic Diocese of San Jose in Nueva Ecija (Philippines)
- Roman Catholic Diocese of San José de Mayo (Uruguay)
- Roman Catholic Diocese of San Jose in California (United States)

== See also ==
- Apostolic Vicariate of San José de Amazonas (Peru)
- Apostolic Vicariate of San Jose in Mindoro (Philippines)
