= Henchir-Khachoum =

Henchir-Khachoum الخرطومأنقاض Muzuca
- Location in Tunisia
- Coordinates: 35°13′53″N 9°7′46″E
- Country: Tunisia
- Governorate: Sidi Bouzid Governorate

Population
  - Ethnicities: Arab
  - Ethnicities density: 55.11/km^{2} (142.7/sq mi)
  - Religions: Islam
- Time zone: UTC1 (CET)
- Postal code: 1250

Henchir-Khachoum is a locality and series of archaeological sites in Sidi Bouzid Governorate modern Tunisia. The ruins are strewn along a tributary of the Oued El Hatech river east of Sbeitla. During the Roman Empire there was a Roman town of the Roman province of Africa Proconsularis, called Muzuca, one of two North African towns to bare that name.

In antiquity the town was also the seat of a Christian bishopric, suffragan of the Archdiocese of Carthage.

There are three documented bishops of Muzuca.

- Gennaro took part in the Council of Carthage (256) called by St. Cyprian to discuss the question of the lapsi.
- The Catholic bishop Rufiniano who attended the Council of Carthage (411), and the Council of Carthage (419) called by Saint Aurelius.
- Felice took part in the synod of 484 called by the Vandal king Huneric, after which Felice was exiled.

Today Muzuca in Proconsulari survives as titular bishopric of the Roman Catholic Church, and the current bishop is Celmo Lazzari, of San Miguel de Sucumbíos.

== See also ==
- Sufetula (see)
