= Miguel Olaortúa Laspra =

Spanish-born Peruvian Roman Catholic prelate (1962–2019)

Miguel Olaortúa Laspra OSA
- Vicar Apostolic of Iquitos
- Native name: Miguel Olaortua Laspra
- Church: Catholic Church
- See: Apostolic Vicariate of Iquitos
- In office: 2 February 2011 – 1 November 2019
- Predecessor: Julián García Centeno
- Successor: Miguel Ángel Cadenas Cardo
- Other post: Titular Bishop of Abbir Maius 2011-2019
- Previous post: Apostolic Administrator of San José de Amazonas (2011-2015)

Orders
- Ordination: 4 October 1987
- Consecration: 16 April 2011 by Ricardo Blázquez

Personal details
- Born: 22 November 1962 Bilbao, Biscay, Spanish State
- Died: 1 November 2019 (aged 56) Iquitos, Department of Loreto, Peru
- Coat of arms

Miguel Olaortúa Laspra (22 November 1962 – 1 November 2019) was a Peruvian Roman Catholic prelate.

Olaortúa Laspra was born in Spain in November 1962 and was ordained to the priesthood in 1988. He served as auxiliary bishop of Abbir Marius and as bishop of the Apostolic Vicariate of Iquitos, Peru, from 2011 until his death in 2019.
