= Domenico Berni =

Italian Roman Catholic bishop (1940–2026)

The Most Reverend Domenico Berni
- Prelate of Chuquibambilla
- Archdiocese: Cusco
- Appointed: 29 March 1989
- Term ended: 24 April 2018
- Predecessor: Lorenzo Miccheli Filippetti
- Successor: Edinson Edgardo Farfán Córdova

Orders
- Ordination: 29 June 1966
- Consecration: 10 September 1989 by Luigi Dossena, Giovanni Volta, Antonio Giuseppe Angioni

Personal details
- Born: 26 May 1940 Bedonia, Italy
- Died: 8 November 2026 (aged 86) Genoa, Italy

Domenico Berni (26 May 1940 – 8 November 2026) was an Italian Roman Catholic bishop. He was prelate of the Territorial Prelature of Chuquibambilla from 1989 to 2018.

Berni was a close friend of Pope Leo XIV. He died on 8 November 2026 at the age of 86.
