= Roman Catholic Archdiocese of Cusco =

Roman Catholic archdiocese in Peru

Coordinates: 13.516276°S 71.977926°W

Archdiocese of Cusco Archidioecesis Cuschensis

Catholic
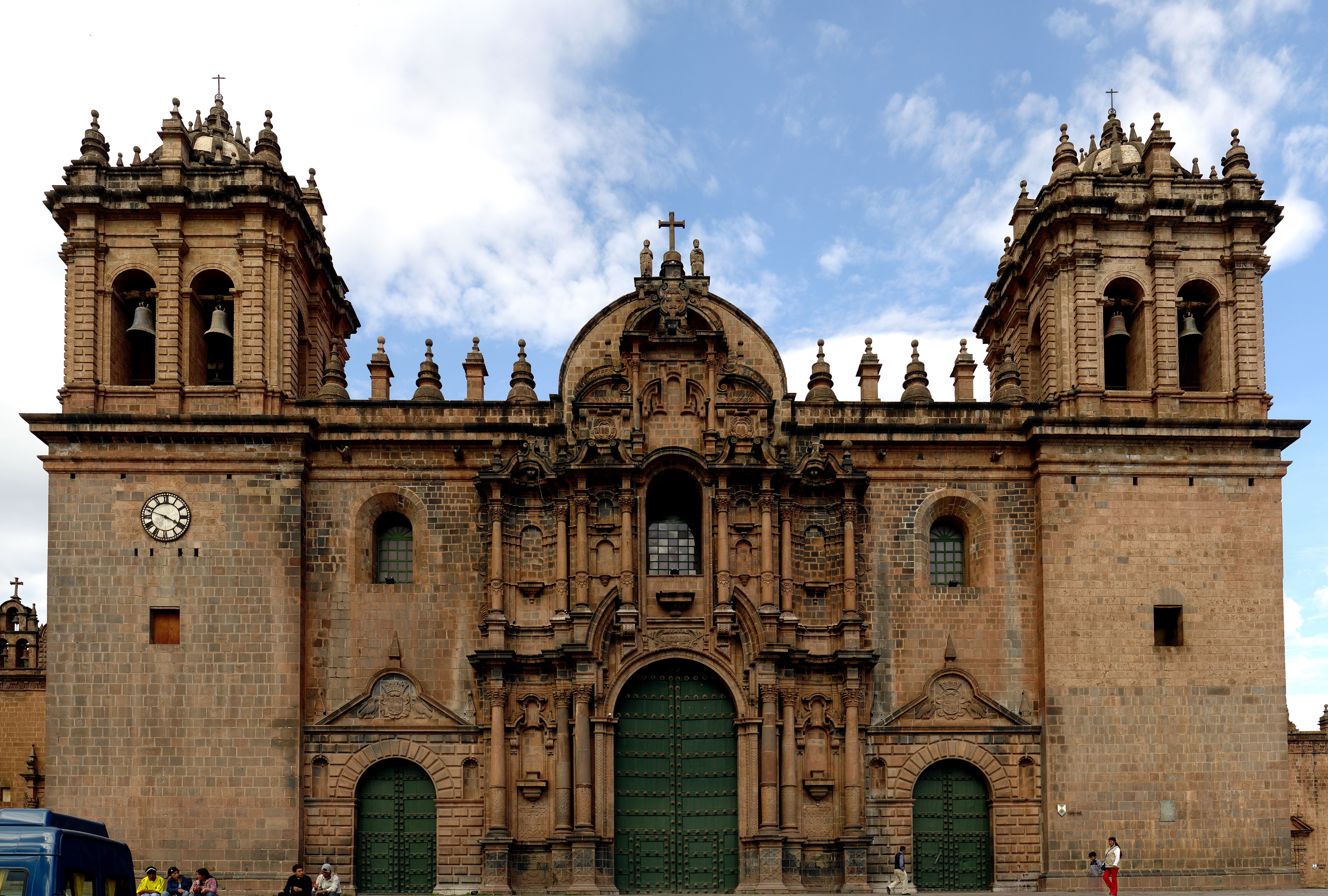
- Cathedral Basilica of Our Lady of the Assumption

Location
- Country: Peru

Statistics
- Area: 23,807 km^{2} (9,192 sq mi)
- Population: Total; Catholics: (as of 2014); 1,594,000; 1,538,000 (90.6%)
- Parishes: 85

Information
- Rite: Latin Rite
- Cathedral: Catedral Basílica de la Virgen de la Asunción

Current leadership
- Pope: Leo XIV
- Archbishop: Lizardo Estrada Herrera, O.S.A.
- Bishops emeritus: Juan Antonio Ugarte Pérez

Website
- www.arzobispadodelcusco.org

The Roman Catholic Archdiocese of Cusco (Latin: Cuschen(sis)) is a Latin Metropolitan archdiocese with see in the city and old Inca imperial capital of Cusco, in Peru.

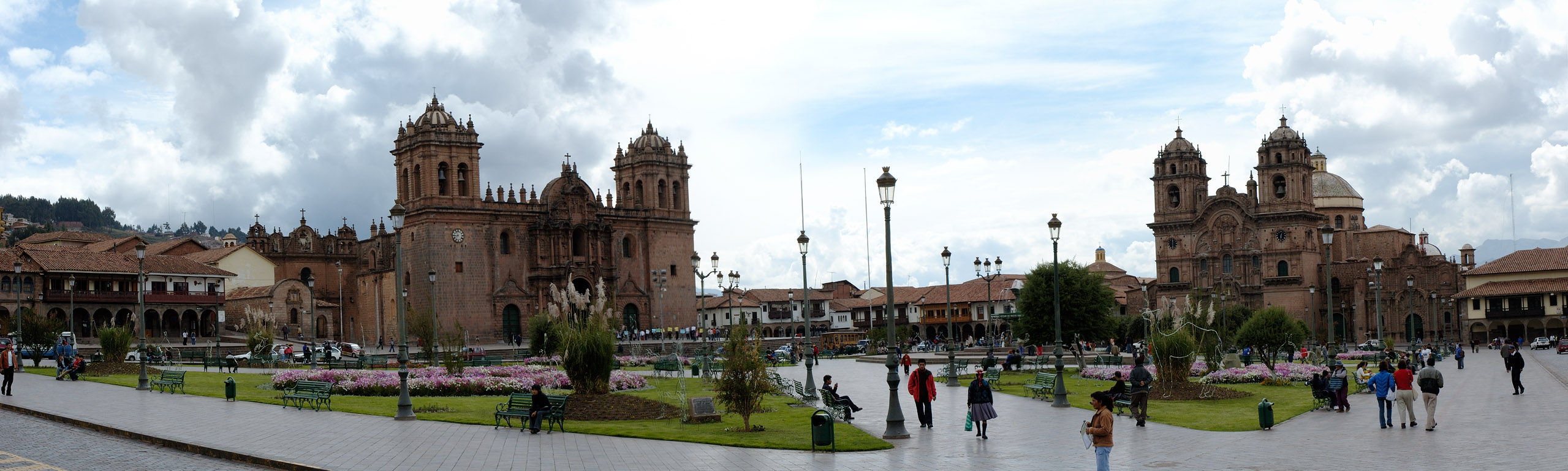
Plaza De Armas (main square). The Cathedral lies on the left and the Jesuit church ("Compañía de Jesus") is on the right.

Its Cathedral archiepiscopal see is the Cathedral Basilica of the Assumption of the Virgin. It also has a Marian Minor basilica: Basílica Nuestra Señora de las Mercedes.

== History ==
- Established on 5 September 1536 as Diocese of Cusco, on vast South American territory split off from the Metropolitan Roman Catholic Archdiocese of Sevilla, in colonial mother country Spain
- It lost territories repeatedly, to establish dioceses: on 1541.05.14 Lima, on 1547.07.01 Paraguay, on 1552.06.27 La Plata (Argentina), on 1609.07.20 Ayacucho, on 1861.10.07 Puno and on 1900.01.05 the Apostolic Prefecture of San Domingo de Urubamba.
- Between 1546 and 1943 suffragan of the Archdiocese of Lima
- Promoted on 23 May 1943 as Metropolitan Archdiocese of Cusco
- Lost territories to establish on 1958.04.28 the Diocese of Abancay and on 1959.01.10 the Territorial Prelature of Sicuani, both as its suffragan
- It enjoyed a papal visit by Pope John Paul II in February 1985.

== Province ==
Its ecclesiastical province comprises the Metropolitan's own Archdiocese and the following suffragan sees, all in Peru :

- Roman Catholic Diocese of Abancay
- Roman Catholic Diocese of Sicuani
- Territorial Prelature of Chuquibambilla

== Episcopal ordinaries ==
(all Roman Rite)

Suffragan Bishops of Cusco

- Vicente Valverde Alvarez, Dominican Order (O.P.) (8 Jan 1537 – 31 Oct 1541 Died)
- Juan Solano, O.P. (29 Feb 1544 – 1562 Resigned)
- Francisco Ramirez (bishop) (6 July 1562 – 1564 Died)
- Mateo Pinello (19 Jan 1565 – 1569 Died)
- Sebastián Lartaún (4 Sep 1570 – 9 Oct 1583 Died)
- Gregorio de Montalvo Olivera, O.P. (16 Nov 1587 – 11 Dec 1592 Died), previously Bishop of Yucatán (Mexico) (1580.12.15 – 1587.11.16)
- Antonio de Raya Navarrete (6 June 1594 – 28 July 1606 Died)
- Fernando Mendoza González (12 Jan 1609 – 1618 Died)
- Lorenzo Pérez de Grado (18 March 1619 – 4 Sep 1627 Died), previously Bishop of Paraguay (Paraguay) (1615.09.16 – 1619.03.18)
- Archbishop-Bishop Fernando de Vera y Zuñiga, Augustinian Order (O.E.S.A.) (16 Jul 1629 – 9 Nov 1638 Died), previously Titular Bishop of Bugia (1614.02.17 – 1628.11.13) & Auxiliary Bishop of Badajoz (Spain) (1614.02.17 – 1628.11.13), Metropolitan Archbishop of Santo Domingo (Dominican Republic) (1628.11.13 – 1629.07.16)
  - Diego Montoya Mendoza (16 July 1640 Appointed – Did Not Take Effect as he died two days before appointment)
- Juan Alonso y Ocón (31 Aug 1643 – 17 July 1651); previously Bishop of Yucatán (Mexico) (1638.06.14 – 1643.08.31); later Archbishop of La Plata o Charcas) (Bolivia) (1651.07.17 – 1656.06.29)
- Pedro de Ortega y Sotomayor (27 Nov 1651 – 1658 Died), previously Bishop of Trujillo (Peru) (1645 – 1647), Bishop of Arequipa (Peru) (1647 – 1651.11.27)
- Agustín Muñoz Sandoval (17 Nov 1659 – April 1661 Died)
- Bernardo de Izaguirre de los Reyes (31 July 1662 – 15 July 1669), previously Bishop of Panamá (Panama) (1654.05.18 – 1660); later Archbishop of La Plata (not possessed 1669.07.15 – death 1670.03.17)
- Manuel de Mollinedo y Angulo (15 Dec 1670 – 26 Sep 1699 Died)
- Juan González de Santiago (9 Feb 1705 – 12 Dec 1707 Died)
- uncanonical: Melchior de la Nava y Moreno (1712.05.09 – 1714 without papal mandate)
- Gabriel de Arregui y Gutiérrez, Friars Minor (O.F.M.) (13 Jan 1716 – 9 Oct 1724 Died), previously Bishop of Buenos Aires (Argentina) (1712.06.23 – 1716.01.14)
- Bernardo de Serreda y Villate, Carmelite Order (O. Carm.) (19 Dec 1725 – 2 March 1733 Died), previously Bishop of Panamá (Panama) (1720 – 1725.12.19)
- José Manuel de Sarricolea y Olea (5 May 1734 – 2 Oct 1740 Died), previously Bishop of Córdoba (Argentina) ([1723.09.19] 1723.11.22 – 1730.07.24), Bishop of Santiago (Chile) (1730.07.24 – 1734.05.05)
- Pedro Morcillo Rubio de Auñón (18 April 1742 – 1 April 1747 Died), previously Titular Bishop of Draso (1724.02.14 – 1731.12.17) & Auxiliary Bishop of Lima (Peru) (1724.02.14 – 1731.12.17), Bishop of Panamá (Panama) (1731.12.17 – 1741.07.20)
- Juan de Castañeda Velásquez y Salazar (20 Jan 1749 – 22 Feb 1762 Died), previously Bishop of Panamá (Panama) (1742 – 1749.01.20)
- Juan Manuel Jerónimo de Romaní y Carrillo (26 Sep 1763 – 15 Sep 1768 Died), previously Bishop of Panamá (Panama) (1758.03.13 – 1763.09.26)
- Agustín Gorritátegui Gorrichategui (12 Dec 1770 – 28 Oct 1776 Died)
- Juan Manuel Moscoso y Peralta (28 Sep 1778 – 3 Aug 1789) previously Titular Bishop of Tricomia (1770.03.12 – 1771.06.17) & Auxiliary Bishop of Arequipa (Peru) ([1769.10.15] 1770.03.12 – 1771.06.17), Bishop of Córdoba (Argentina) (1771.06.17 – 1778.09.28); later Archbishop of Granada (1789.08.03 – death 1811.07.24)
- Bartolomé María de las Heras Navarro (14 Dec 1789 – 31 March 1806), later Archbishop of Lima (1806.03.31 – death 1823.09.06)
- José Maria Pérez Armendáriz (31 March 1806 – 9 Feb 1819 Died)
- José Calixto Orihuela Valderrama, O.E.S.A. (27 June 1821 – 25 Aug 1838 Resigned), previously Titular Bishop of Calama (1819.03.29 – 1821.06.27) & Auxiliary Bishop of Cusco (Peru) (1819.03.29 – 1821.06.27)
- Eugenio Mendoza Jara (17 Sep 1838 – 18 Aug 1854 Died)
- Julián Ochoa Campos (27 March 1865 – 17 Sep 1875 Resigned)
- Pedro José Tordoya Montoya (17 Sep 1875 – 23 March 1880 Resigned) previously Titular Bishop of Tiberiopolis (1860.03.23 – 1875.09.17) & Auxiliary Bishop of Archbishop of Lima (Peru) (1860.03.23 – 1875.09.17); emeritate as Titular Bishop of Arad (1880.08.20 – 1881)
- Juan Antonio Falcón Iturrizaga (19 Jan 1893 – 1 May 1909 Died)
- José Gregorio Castro Miranda, O.F.M. (21 March 1910 – 13 Nov 1917 Resigned), emeritate as Titular Bishop of Clazomenæ (1917.11.13 – 1924.01.30)
- Pedro Pascuál Francesco Farfán de los Godos (19 April 1918 – 18 Sep 1933), previously Bishop of Huaraz (Peru) (1907.03.05 – 1918.04.19); later Archbishop of Lima (Peru) (1933.09.18 – 1945.09.17)
- Felipe Santiago Hermosa y Sarmiento (13 June 1935 – 23 May 1943 see below)

Metropolitan Archbishops of Cusco

- Felipe Santiago Hermosa y Sarmiento (see above 23 May 1943 – 17 Dec 1956 Resigned), later Archbishop Military Vicar of Peru (Peru) (1956.12.17 – 1967), emeritate as Titular Archbishop of Berœa (1956.12.17 – 1971.01.20)
- Carlos Maria Jurgens Byrne, Redemptorists (C.SS.R.) (17 Dec 1956 – 6 Dec 1965), previously Bishop of Huancavelica (Peru) (1949.01.13 – 1954.02.07), Titular Bishop of Nisyrus (1954.02.07 – 1956.12.17) & Military Vicar of Peru (Peru) (1954.02.07 – 1956.12.17); later Archbishop of Trujillo (1965.12.06 – resigned 1976)
- Ricardo Durand Flórez, Jesuits (S.J.) (14 Feb 1966 – 14 Jan 1975), later Archbishop-Bishop of Callao (Peru) (1975.01.14 – retired 1995.08.17), also President of Episcopal Conference of Peru (1988 – 1991)
- Luis Vallejos Santoni (14 Jan 1975 – 8 June 1982 Died), previously Bishop of Callao (Peru) (1971.09.20 – 1975.01.14)
- Alcides Mendoza Castro (5 Oct 1983 – 29 Nov 2003 Retired); previously Titular Bishop of Metræ (1958.04.28 – 1962.12.05) & Auxiliary Bishop of Abancay (Peru) (1958.04.28 – 1962.12.05) succeeding as Bishop of Abancay (1962.12.05 – 1967.08.12), Titular Archbishop of Pederodiana (1967.08.12 – 1983.10.05) & Archbishop Military Vicar of Peru (Peru) (1967.08.12 – 1983.10.05)
- Juan Antonio Ugarte Pérez (29 Nov 2003 – 28 Oct 2014 Retired); previously Titular Bishop of Castro (1983.08.18 – 1997.03.15) & Auxiliary Bishop of Abancay (Peru) (1983.08.18 – 1986.10.18) & Auxiliary Bishop of Cusco (Peru) (1986.10.18 – 1991.12.04), Auxiliary Bishop of Yauyos (Peru) (1991.12.04 – 1997.03.15), Bishop-Prelate of Territorial Prelature of Yauyos (Peru) (1997.03.15 – 2003.11.29)
- Richard Daniel Alarcón Urrutia (28 Oct 2014 – 30 Oct 2026), previously Bishop of Tarma (Peru) (2001.06.13 – 2014.10.28)
- Lizardo Estrada Herrera, O.S.A. (since 30 Oct 2026)

== Coadjutor archbishop ==
- Lizardo Estrada Herrera, O.S.A. (29 Aug 2026 – 30 Oct 2026)

=== Auxiliary bishops ===
^José Calixto Orihuela Valderrama, O.E.S.A. (1819-1821), appointed Bishop here

- Elías Prado Tello (1963-1972), appointed Auxiliary Bishop of Ayacucho o Huamanga
- Severo Aparicio Quispe, O. de M. (1978-1999)
- Juan Antonio Ugarte Pérez (1986-1991), appointed Auxiliary Bishop of Yauyos (later returned here as Archbishop)
- Lizardo Estrada Herrera, O.S.A. (9 Jan 2021 – 29 Aug 2026)

=== Other priests of this diocese who became bishops ===
- Francisco José Marán, appointed Bishop of Concepción, Chile in 1779
- Fidel María Cosío y Medina, appointed Bishop of Puno in 1923
- Ciro Quispe López, appointed Prelate of Juli in 2018

== See also ==
- Roman Catholicism in Peru

== Sources and external links ==
- GCatholic.org, with incumbent bio links
- Catholic Hierarchy [self-published]
- Diocesan website (in Spanish)
