= Alcides Mendoza Castro =

- Archbishop of Cusco
- Church: Catholic Church
- Archdiocese: Archdiocese of Cusco
- In office: 5 October 1983 – 29 November 2003
- Predecessor: Luis Vallejos Santoni
- Successor: Juan Antonio Ugarte Pérez
- Previous posts: Titular Archbishop of Pederodiana (1967-1983) (Arch)Bishop of Military Ordinariate of Peru (1967-1983); Bishop of Abancay (1962-1967); Titular Bishop of Metrae (1958-1962); Auxiliary Bishop of Abancay (1958-1962)

Orders
- Ordination: 15 September 1951
- Consecration: 6 July 1958 by Carlos Jurgens Byrne

Personal details
- Born: 14 March 1928 Mariscal Cáceres District, Department of Huancavelica, Peru
- Died: 20 June 2012 (aged 84)

Alcides Mendoza Castro (14 March 1928 – 20 June 2012) was the Catholic archbishop of the Archdiocese of Cuzco, Peru.

Ordained to the priesthood in 1951, he was named bishop in 1958 and in 1983 was named Archbishop of the Cuzco Archdiocese; he retired in 2003.

== External links and additional sources ==
- Cheney, David M. "Archdiocese of Cuzco". Catholic-Hierarchy.org. (for Chronology of Bishops)^{self-published}
- Chow, Gabriel. "Metropolitan Archdiocese of Cusco". GCatholic.org. (for Chronology of Bishops)^{self-published}
