= Putia in Byzacena =

Africa Proconsularis (125 AD)

The diocese of Puzia in Byzacena (Latin: Dioecesis Putiensis in Byzacena) is a suppressed and titular seat of the Roman Catholic Church.

== History ==
Puzia in Byzacena was centered on a Roman era civitas of the Province of Byzacena, in what was Roman North Africa. That town has been tentatively identified with ruins at Bir-Abdallah, Tunisia.

The only known bishop of this diocese is Servando, who took part in the synod gathered in Carthage by the Vandal king Huneric in 484, after which Servando was exiled.

Today, Puzia in Byzacena survives as a titular bishop's residence. The current titular bishop is Jaime Cristóbal Abril González, auxiliary bishop of Nueva Pamplona.

== Known bishops ==
- Servando † (mentioned in 484)
- Miguel Obando Bravo, S.D.B. (18 January 1968 - 16 February 1970 appointed Archbishop of Managua)
- Hans-Georg (Johannes) Braun † (3 March 1970 - 17 July 2004 deceased)
- Dirceu Vegini (15 March 2006 - 20 October 2010 appointed bishop of Foz do Iguaçu)
- Luis Gonzaga Fechio (January 19, 2011 - January 6, 2016 appointed bishop of Amparo)
- Jaime Cristóbal
- Abril González, from 16 April 2016 Bir-Abdallah
