= Raimundo Revoredo Ruiz =

Peruvian bishop (1927–2021)

Most Reverend Raimundo Revoredo Ruiz
- Bishop of Juli
- Church: Roman Catholic Church
- Metropolis: Roman Catholic Archdiocese of Arequipa
- Diocese: Roman Catholic Territorial Prelature of Juli
- Installed: 25 November 1988
- Term ended: 29 May 1999
- Predecessor: Albert Koenigsknecht
- Successor: Elio Alevi Pérez Tapia

Personal details
- Born: 28 December 1927 Lima, Peru
- Died: 1 December 2021 (aged 93) Lima, Peru

Raimundo Revoredo Ruiz, C.M., (28 December 1927 – 1 December 2021) was a Peruvian Roman Catholic prelate and member of the Congregation of the Mission. He served as the Bishop-Prelate of the Roman Catholic Territorial Prelature of Juli from November 1988 until 29 May 1999.

== Early life ==
Revoredo Ruiz was born in Lima, Peru, to Raimundo Revoredo Arana and Mariluz Ruiz Paz on 28 December 1927. He was ordained a Catholic deacon on 22 January 1950, and a Catholic priest on 29 June 1950, both in Tarragona, Spain. Revoredo taught theology at the Seminario de la Congregación in L'Espluga de Francolí from 1952 to 1954. In 1954, he was sent to Brooklyn in New York City, where he served as a parish priest from until 1964. He was transferred back to his native Peru in 1964.

He died in Lima on 1 December 2021, at the age of 94, from COVID-19.

Ruiz resigned from his post on May 29, 1999, and returned to his religious order, where he held various positions, including pastor and parish vicar. He spent his final months in the infirmary of the central house in Lima. He died in Lima in early December 2021 at the age of 93.
