= Francisco Ramírez (bishop) =

Roman Catholic prelate (died 1564)

Most Reverend Francisco Ramírez
- Bishop of Cusco
- Church: Catholic Church
- Diocese: Diocese of Cusco
- In office: 1562–1564
- Predecessor: Juan Solano
- Successor: Mateo Pinello

Personal details
- Died: 1564 Cuzco Peru

Francisco Ramírez (died 1564) was a Roman Catholic prelate who served as Bishop of Cuzco (1562–1564).

== Biography ==
On 6 Jul 1562, Antonio de Raya Navarrete was appointed during the papacy of Pope Pius IV as Bishop of Cusco. He served as Bishop of Cusco until his death in 1564.

== External links and additional sources ==
- Cheney, David M. "Archdiocese of Cuzco". Catholic-Hierarchy.org. (for Chronology of Bishops) ^{[self-published]}
- Chow, Gabriel. "Metropolitan Archdiocese of Cusco (Peru)". GCatholic.org. (for Chronology of Bishops) ^{[self-published]}

Catholic Church titles
Preceded by Juan Solano	Bishop of Cusco; 1562–1564	Succeeded by Mateo Pinello
