= William McDermott =

Irish-born Roman Catholic bishop

William Dermott Molloy McDermott (10 May 1930 in Dublin, Ireland - 19 August 2013 in Lima, Peru) was the Bishop of the Diocese of Huancavelica, Peru.

== Biography ==
Born in Dublin, Ireland, in 1930, McDermott studied for the priesthood first with the Dominicans, then at St. Patrick's, Carlow College, completing his studies he was ordained a priest on 5 June 1955 for the Diocese of Birmingham in Alabama, United States. Known as "Monseñor Demetrio", he became a Peruvian missionary several years later. For fourteen years, he led a rural parish in Huancarama in the Apurímac Region, where he learned the Quechua language.

On 19 May 1976 he was appointed, by Pope Paul VI, Titular Bishop of Thucca in Mauretania and Auxiliary Bishop for the Diocese of Huancavelica. He was ordained a bishop on 4 June of the same year. The Principal Consecrator was Enrique Pélach y Feliú, Bishop of Abancay and Co-Consecrators were Alcides Mendez Castro, titular Archbishop of Pederoniana and Military Ordinary for Peru, and Florencio Romani, Bishop of Huancavélica.

On 14 January 1982 he was appointed Bishop of Huancavelica. He knew govern his diocese in very difficult times for material and spiritual poverty and terrorism. True to its motto "Love is repaid with love" never ceased to promote a culture of peace.

He was the principal consecrator of his coadjutor, the Spanish bishop Isidro Barrio Barrio, 25 May 2002. The latter succeeded him as bishop of Huancavelica, 18 June 2005, when he resigned from office.

In January 2005, Bishop Demetrio Molloy suffered a triple stroke which left him paralyzed until his death. Each week, the priests of his diocese eleven hours traveling to Lima to accompany and pray with their bishop who was under the care of the Daughters of St. Camillus Nursing Home in the Tezza Clinic, where offered all his sufferings by the good of the Church.

He died in Lima, Peru on 19 August 2013 and was buried in the crypt of the cathedral of Huancavelica.
