= Bir-Abdallah =

Coordinates: 35°33′10″N 9°56′28″E

Bir-Abdallah is a locality in southern Tunisia, in North Africa. It is located at 35° 33' 10" N, 9° 56' 28" E.

The site has a well from antiquity and is nearby to El Mejabra, Ghedir el Mahfoura and Feddane el Begar. It is 15 kilometres (590,000,000 mils) southwest of Al Qayrawān.

== History ==
A number of Roman ruins dot the opposite bank of the Oued El Hatech. During the Roman Empire, Bir Abdallah was the site of a Roman town which was the seat of an ancient Christian Bishopric, which survives to this day as a titular see of the Roman Catholic Church.

The history of the town changed forever with the foundation of Kairouan around 670, when the Arab general Uqba ibn Nafi of Amir Muauia selected the nearby village of Kamounia as the location of a military post for the conquest of the Maghreb. Kairouan is today one of the Holy cities of Islam.

== Climate ==
Climate data for Bir Abdullah (1961–1990)
Month	Jan	Feb	Mar	Apr	May	Jun	Jul	Aug	Sep	Oct	Nov	Dec	Year
Record high °C (°F)	30.0 (86.0)	34.0 (93.2)	38.9 (102.0)	37.8 (100.0)	44.0 (111.2)	47.0 (116.6)	47.5 (117.5)	48.1 (118.6)	45.0 (113.0)	40.0 (104.0)	36.0 (96.8)	29.0 (84.2)	48.1 (118.6)
Mean daily maximum °C (°F)	16.9 (62.4)	18.3 (64.9)	20.2 (68.4)	23.3 (73.9)	28.3 (82.9)	32.9 (91.2)	36.8 (98.2)	36.3 (97.3)	31.9 (89.4)	26.5 (79.7)	21.6 (70.9)	17.8 (64.0)	25.9 (78.6)
Daily mean °C (°F)	11.5 (52.7)	12.6 (54.7)	14.2 (57.6)	16.9 (62.4)	21.0 (69.8)	25.4 (77.7)	28.5 (83.3)	28.7 (83.7)	25.4 (77.7)	20.8 (69.4)	15.9 (60.6)	12.5 (54.5)	19.4 (66.9)
Mean daily minimum °C (°F)	6.2 (43.2)	6.9 (44.4)	8.2 (46.8)	10.6 (51.1)	14.1 (57.4)	17.9 (64.2)	20.6 (69.1)	21.1 (70.0)	19.1 (66.4)	15.0 (59.0)	10.3 (50.5)	7.2 (45.0)	13.1 (55.6)
Record low °C (°F)	−4.5 (23.9)	−3.0 (26.6)	−3.0 (26.6)	0.0 (32.0)	4.0 (39.2)	6.5 (43.7)	8.0 (46.4)	12.0 (53.6)	9.0 (48.2)	5.5 (41.9)	−3.0 (26.6)	−3.5 (25.7)	−4.5 (23.9)
Average precipitation mm (inches)	24.0 (0.94)	23.9 (0.94)	33.1 (1.30)	29.8 (1.17)	18.9 (0.74)	10.5 (0.41)	6.7 (0.26)	13.3 (0.52)	39.0 (1.54)	49.2 (1.94)	28.9 (1.14)	35.4 (1.39)	312.7 (12.31)
Average precipitation days	4	5	5	5	4	2	1	2	4	5	4	4	45
Average relative humidity (%)	64	62	62	61	58	53	49	53	59	65	65	65	60
Mean monthly sunshine hours	186.0	190.4	226.3	252.0	300.7	324.0	362.7	334.8	270.0	235.6	207.0	186.0	3,075.5
Mean daily sunshine hours	6.0	6.8	7.3	8.4	9.7	10.8	11.7	10.8	9.0	7.6	6.9	6.0	8.4
Source 1: NOAA
Source 2: Deutscher Wetterdienst (extremes, 1901–1990)
