= Nevin William Hayes =

American Bishop of the Catholic Church

His Excellency, The Most Reverend Nevin William Hayes, O.Carm.
- Auxiliary Bishop of Chicago
- Church: Catholic Church
- See: Titular See of Nova Sinna
- In office: February 2, 1971 - July 12, 1988
- Previous post: Prelate of Sicuani

Orders
- Ordination: June 8, 1946
- Consecration: August 5, 1965 by Cletus F. O'Donnell

Personal details
- Born: February 17, 1922 Chicago, Illinois, US
- Died: July 12, 1988 (aged 66) Chicago
- Education: Catholic University of America
- Motto: Jugum Christi servo (I serve the yoke of Christ)

Nevin William Hayes O.Carm. (February 17, 1922 – July 12, 1988) was an American bishop of the Catholic Church. He served as the prelate of the Territorial Prelature of Sicuani in Peru from 1959 to 1970 and as an auxiliary bishop of the Archdiocese of Chicago in Illinois from 1971 to 1988.

== Biography ==
=== Early life ===
Nevin Hayes was born on February 17, 1922, in Chicago, Illinois. He professed religious vows in the Order of the Brothers of Our Lady of Mount Carmel (Carmelites). On June 8, 1946, Hayes was ordained a priest for the Carmelites in Chicago by Bishop William David O’Brien.

Hayes later studied at Catholic University of America in Washington, D.C. The Carmelites in 1947 sent Hayes to their junior seminary in Hamilton, Massachusetts, to teach languages.

=== Prelate of Sicuani ===
Hayes was appointed as the prelate of the Territorial Prelature of Sicuani in Peru on January 10, 1959, by Pope John XXIII. Sicuani was a large territory at high elevations in the Peruvian Andes.

While remaining the prelate of Sicuani, Pope Paul VI appointed him as the titular bishop of Nova Sinna. He was consecrated in Chicago at the Cathedral of the Holy name by Auxiliary Bishop Cletus F. O'Donnell. The principal co-consecrators were Bishops Bernard Joseph Flanagan and William G. Connare. Hayes resigned as prelate on November 7, 1970.

=== Auxiliary Bishop of Chicago ===
Hayes was appointed as an auxiliary bishop of Chicago by Paul VI on February 2, 1971. As auxiliary bishop, he also served as pastor of St. Mary of the Lakes parish in Chicago. He died on July 12, 1988.

In 1994, Leander Troy wrote the book The Dandelion Bishop: Nevin Hayes of Chicago, which discussed Haye's work with indigenous tribes in Peru.

Catholic Church titles
Preceded by None	Prelate of Sicuani; 1959–1970	Succeeded by Miguel La Fay Bardi, O. Carm.
