= Miguel La Fay Bardi =

American priest (1934–2021)

Miguel La Fay Bardi, O. Carm., born Michael La Fay, (November 11, 1934 – October 20, 2021) was an American-born Roman Catholic prelate. La Fay Bardi served as the Prelate of the Territorial Prelature of Sicuani, now known as the present-day Roman Catholic Diocese of Sicuani in Sicuani, Peru, from July 26, 1999, until his retirement on July 10, 2013.

La Fay was born on November 11, 1934, in Chelsea, Massachusetts. He was ordained as a Carmelite Roman Catholic priest on July 4, 1960.

Bishop emeritus Miguel La Fay Bardi died on October 20, 2021, in Boston, Massachusetts, at the age of 86.

== Honors ==
- Gold Medal of Saint Toribio de Mogrovejo (Medalla de Oro de Santo Toribio de Mogrovejo) – Peru, 2011
