= Julián García Centeno =

Spanish-born Peruvian Roman Catholic bishop (born 1933)

The Most Reverend Julián García Centeno O.S.A.
- Vicar Apostolic of Iquitos emeritus
- Church: Catholic Church
- See: Iquitos
- Appointed: 5 January 1991
- Term ended: 2 February 2011
- Predecessor: Gabino Peral de la Torre
- Successor: Miguel Olaortúa Laspra
- Previous posts: Auxiliary Bishop of Iquitos (1989–1991); Titular Bishop of Girus (since 1989)

Orders
- Ordination: 13 July 1958
- Consecration: 22 October 1989 by Mario Tagliaferri

Personal details
- Born: 22 October 1933 (age 92) Sitrama de Tera, Zamora, Spain

Julián García Centeno O.S.A. (born 22 October 1933) is a Spanish-born Peruvian (Note: The Vicariate Apostolic of Iquitos states that García Centeno is nacionalizado peruano (naturalized Peruvian).) Roman Catholic prelate who served as Vicar Apostolic of Iquitos in Peru from 1991 until his retirement in 2011. He is a titular bishop of Girus and is Vicar Apostolic emeritus of Iquitos.

== Early life and priesthood ==
García Centeno was born in Sitrama de Tera, in the province of Zamora, Spain, on 22 October 1933. He joined the Order of Saint Augustine and was ordained a priest on 13 July 1958. He was linked to the Filipino Augustinians of Valladolid, where he served as a professor of Theology at the Augustinian Theological Study Center while also acting as a formator for new generations of young Augustinians. Also he had earned a doctorate in theology with a specialization in catechetical pastoral work.

== Episcopate ==
On 19 June 1989, Pope John Paul II appointed García Centeno titular Bishop of Girus and Auxiliary Bishop of the Apostolic Vicariate of Iquitos. The appointment was recorded in the Acta Apostolicae Sedis; the relevant notice identifies him as a member of the Order of Friars of Saint Augustine and names him Auxiliary of the Vicariate of Iquitos.

He was consecrated bishop on 22 October 1989 at the Church of San Agustín in Valladolid, Spain. The principal consecrator was Archbishop Mario Tagliaferri, Apostolic Nuncio to Peru; the principal co-consecrators were Archbishop José Delicado Baeza, Archbishop of Valladolid, and Augustinian bishop Gabino Peral de la Torre, then Vicar Apostolic of Iquitos.

=== Vicar Apostolic of Iquitos ===
On 5 January 1991, García Centeno was appointed Vicar Apostolic of Iquitos, succeeding Gabino Peral de la Torre. He took possession of the vicariate on 10 March 1991. He served as the fifth Vicar Apostolic of Iquitos.

During his episcopate he was involved in pastoral work in the Peruvian Amazon. García Centeno also supported the work of the Vicariate's human-rights office. The Augustinian province has reported that he hired lawyer Rita Ruck more than twenty years before the publication of its account, when he was still bishop of Iquitos; Ruck subsequently worked with indigenous communities and human-rights initiatives in the region. Later he eventually obtained Peruvian citizenship.

== Retirement and later life ==
On 2 February 2011, Pope Benedict XVI accepted García Centeno's resignation as Vicar Apostolic of Iquitos and appointed the Augustinian Miguel Olaortúa Laspra as his successor. The Vicariate of Iquitos likewise records 2 February 2011 as the date on which Benedict XVI accepted his resignation.

After his retirement, García Centeno continued to be associated with the Augustinian and Peruvian Church communities. In 2016 he was listed among the Augustinian bishops meeting with the General Council of the Order of Saint Augustine in Rome, where he was identified as emeritus of Iquitos.

In November 2019 he participated in the funeral rites for his successor Miguel Olaortúa Laspra in Iquitos. In July 2021 he returned to Iquitos from Spain to preside at the episcopal ordination of Miguel Ángel Cadenas Cardo, his former deacon and priest.

== See also ==
Apostolic Vicariate of Iquitos
