= Juan Solano =

Spanish Dominican missionary and bishop

The Right Rev. Lord Brother Juan Solano, O.P.
- Bishop Emeritus of Cuzco
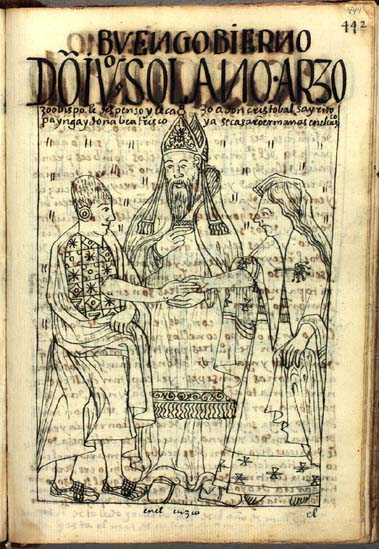
- Solano sealing the marriage of Sayri Túpac (from the Nueva Corónica y Buen Gobierno by Felipe Guaman Poma de Ayala)
- Province: Seville (1544–1546); Lima (1546–1562)
- See: Cuzco
- In office: 29 February 1544–1562
- Predecessor: Vincente de Valverde y Alvarez de Toledo, O.P.
- Successor: Francisco Ramírez

Orders
- Ordination: c. 1530
- Consecration: 24 October 1546 by Archbishop Jerónimo de Loayza, O.P.

Personal details
- Born: c. 1505 Archidona, Málaga, Crown of Castile
- Died: 14 January 1580 Rome, Papal States
- Buried: Basilica of Santa Maria sopra Minerva, Rome, Italy

Juan Solano, O.P. (c. 1505 – 1580), was a Spanish Dominican missionary and the second Catholic bishop of the Diocese of Cuzco, Peru (1544–1562).

== Biography ==
Solano was born in about 1504 in Archidona, a town in the Province of Málaga. He studied at the Colegio de San Esteban of the University of Salamanca. It was there that he decided to enter the Dominican Order. He began his novitiate in the last months of 1524, and made his final profession on 24 December 1525. Solano then served in various positions before becoming prior of the Monastery of Santo Domingo in Peñafiel.

In September 1543, Solano was nominated as the second Bishop of Cuzco by Emperor Charles V. Without waiting for papal confirmation and still not consecrated to the episcopacy, Solano took the opportunity to embark to Peru with the Viceroy Blasco Núñez Vela. They left Sanlúcar de Barrameda on November 3, 1543, and arrived at Nombre de Dios in modern Panama on January 10 of the following year. On January 24, 1544, Solano set sail from Panama, landing at Tumbes, Peru, on March 4 and continuing the journey by land to Lima.

Due to the rebellion of Gonzalo Pizarro, Solano was unable to enter Cusco and take possession of his see. Instead, he joined the royal army. He was first able to enter Cusco on 3 November 1545, and was finally consecrated as bishop on October 24, 1546, by his fellow Dominican friar, Jerónimo de Loayza, the newly elevated Archbishop of Lima. He was, however, forced out of the city after the Battle of Huarina in 1547. Because of his loyalty to the king, Solano roused the ire of the rebel Francisco de Carvajal, who commented that he, "having sat in his church and prayed for peace among Christians, walked around the camp like a field marshal". After the defeat at Huarina, Solano joined the forces of Pedro de la Gasca. He was present at the Battle of Jaquijahuana, which decisively ended the uprising in favor of the royalist Viceroyalty of Peru.

As bishop, Solano was an eager defender of the rights of the native Peruvians. He obtained money from the Spanish conquistadores from the booty they had gained in their victory with the purpose of relieving the suffering of the native population, with which he built the Hospital de San Lázaro. This hospital, finished in 1552, was the first of its kind in Peru. His episcopacy also saw the laying of the foundation of the current Cathedral of Cusco. He was the principal consecrator of García Díaz Arias, the first Bishop of Quito (1547); and the principal co-consecrator of Martín de Calatayud, the third Bishop of Santa Marta (1547).

Solano returned to Spain in October 1560, seeking support in his efforts to curb the behavior of the conquerors as well as the division of his diocese, which he considered too large for a single bishop. Having failed in Spain, he traveled to Rome, hoping to interest Pope Pius IV in his cause. Once again he failed and resigned as bishop in 1562. Solano retired to the Dominican convent of Santa Maria sopra Minerva in Rome. In his later days he was instrumental in transforming the convent's studium on the model of the college of St. Gregory at Valladolid in his native Spain into the College of St. Thomas to which he left his entire estate. The college would later be transformed into the Pontifical University of Saint Thomas Aquinas, commonly called the Angelicum.

Solano died in Rome on February 19, 1580.

== External links and additional sources ==
- Cheney, David M. "Archdiocese of Cuzco". Catholic-Hierarchy.org. (for Chronology of Bishops) ^{[self-published]}
- Chow, Gabriel. "Metropolitan Archdiocese of Cusco (Peru)". GCatholic.org. (for Chronology of Bishops) ^{[self-published]}

Catholic Church titles
Preceded by Vincente de Valverde	Bishop of Cusco; 1544–1562	Succeeded by Francisco Ramirez (bishop)
