= Isidro Sala Ribera =

Peruvian Roman Catholic bishop (1933–2019)

- Bishop of Abancay
- Church: Catholic Church
- Diocese: Diocese of Abancay
- In office: 1 December 1992 – 20 June 2009
- Predecessor: Enric Pèlach i Feliu
- Successor: Gilberto Gómez
- Previous posts: Coadjutor Bishop of Abancay (1990-1992); Titular Bishop of Cluentum (1986-1990); Auxiliary Bishop of Abancay (1986-1990)

Orders
- Ordination: 28 July 1958
- Consecration: 14 December 1986 by Ignacio María de Orbegozo y Goicoechea

Personal details
- Born: 3 March 1933 Bergús (southwest of Cardona), Catalonia, Spanish Republic
- Died: 26 March 2019 (aged 86) Abancay, Apurímac, Peru

Isidro Sala Ribera (3 March 1933 – 26 March 2019) was a Peruvian Roman Catholic bishop.

Sala Ribera was born in Peru and was ordained to the priesthood in 1958. He served as titular bishop of Civitanova and as auxiliary bishop of the Roman Catholic Diocese of Abancay from 1986 to 1990. He then served as coadjutor bishop of the diocese from 1990 to 1992 and as bishop of the diocese from 1992 to 2009.

He retired in 2009, but continued to work in Abancay, carrying out pastoral work in the areas of agricultural development, child nutrition and healthy housing. He is buried at Abancay Cathedral.
