= José Gregorio Castro =

Peruvian Roman Catholic prelate

Most Reverend José Gregorio Castro O.F.M.
- Bishop of Cuzco
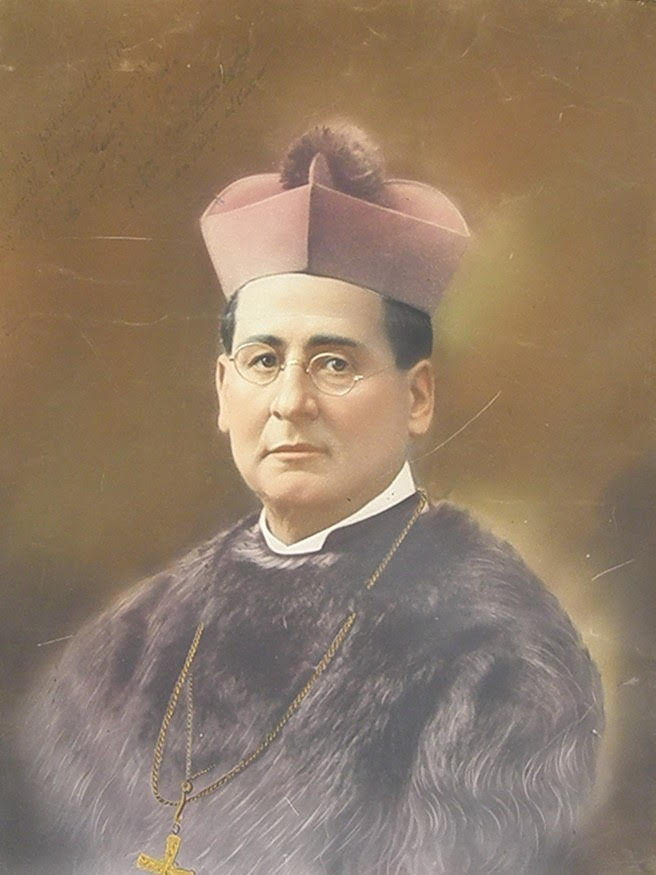
- Portrait in the Cathedral of Cusco
- Church: Catholic Church
- Archdiocese: Cuzco
- Installed: March 21, 1910
- Term ended: November 13, 1917
- Predecessor: Juan Antonio Falcón
- Successor: Pedro Pascual Farfán
- Other posts: Titular bishop of Klazomenai; Auxiliary Bishop of Lima (1917–1924)

Orders
- Ordination: September 23, 1900 by Juan Antonio Falcón
- Consecration: Order of Friars Minor

Personal details
- Born: Facundo Castro Miranda; November 28, 1859 Cusco, Peru
- Died: January 30, 1924 (aged 64) Lima, Peru
- Buried: Convent of San Francisco
- Denomination: Roman Catholicism
- Education: Saint Anthony the Abbot Seminary; National School of Sciences and Arts of Cuzco
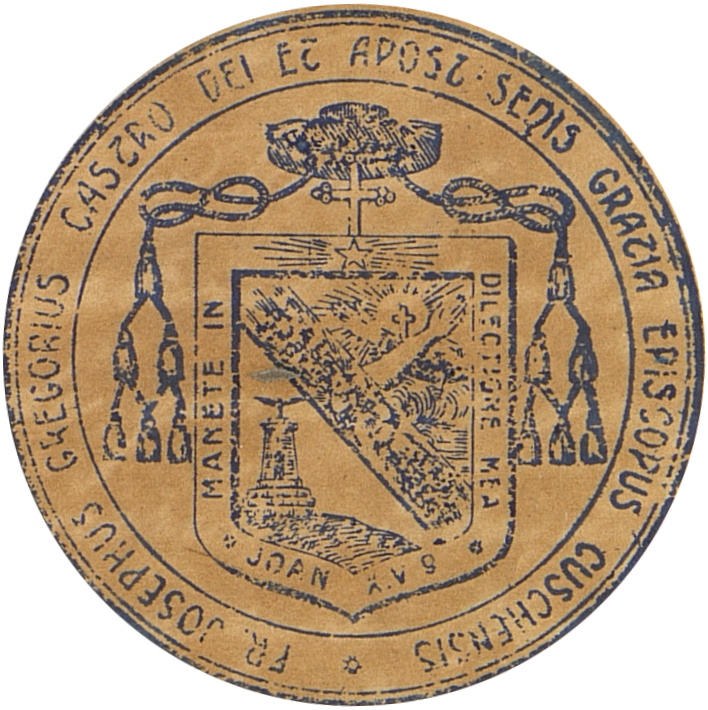
- Coat of arms: José Gregorio Castro's coat of arms

José Gregorio Castro Miranda, O.F.M. (born Facundo Castro Miranda, Cusco, November 28, 1859 — Lima, January 30, 1924), was a Roman Catholic prelate who was Bishop of Cuzco from 1910 to 1917. He mainly worked to integrate the local indigenous population to the church's teachings by translating prayers and church music to Quechua.

== Early life ==
Castro was born in Cusco on November 28, 1859, and was baptized with the name of Facundo Castro Miranda the following year. He was the son of Juan Manuel Castro Maldonado and María Eusebia Miranda Cortés. He studied at institutions that include the Peruvian College, the San Antonio Abad Seminary, and the National School of Sciences and Arts of Cuzco. Apart from being religious, he was a musician, like his brother Florencio.

When Chile declared war on Peru in 1879, he enlisted in the Legion of Honour, and when it was dissolved, he joined the column organized in Lampa Province. Once the war ended, he served as a justice of the peace and did some civic work as a member of the municipal council.

== Religious career ==
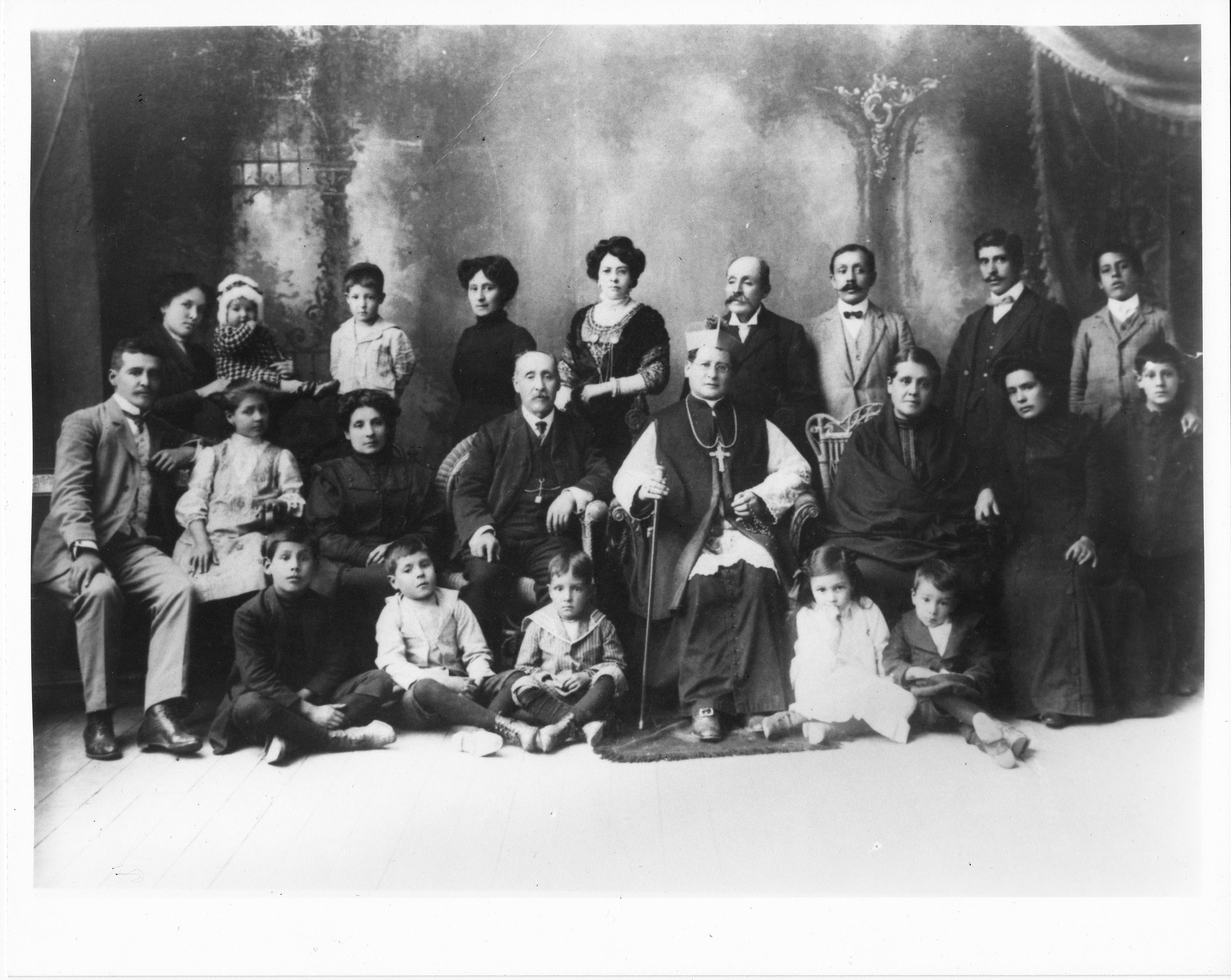
Castro with his family in 1910, when he was the new bishop of Cusco.

He joined the Order of Friars Minor on February 16, 1896, residing in the Convento de los Descalzos, and was ordained as a bishop on September 23, 1900. In 1909, when he resided in the Recoleta Convent, he was elected bishop-elect of Cuzco, and beginning in 1910 he held the position of Bishop of Cusco until his resignation in 1917 (the same year that he would make his last pastoral visit) for health reasons, being succeeded by Pedro Pascual Farfán.

During and after his tenure as bishop, he was in charge of the maintenance and financing of institutions under the administration of the Archdiocese of Cuzco, such as the San Antonio de Abad Seminary in the years 1915 and 1916, among others. During his tenure, he gifted works of art to museums, such as in 1920, when he gifted a copy of Ollantay to the National Archive of Peru.

He wrote works in the Quechua language, including a dictionary, which was used by the clergy to carry out services in the language, as well as a compilation of religious songs in 1920, some of his compositions having been included within these. His publications served for the religious practice of local indigenous citizens in the 1920s, some of which were popular among the locals.

After his resignation, he held the position of Auxiliary Bishop of Lima as well as Titular Bishop of Clazomenae, which he held until his death in 1924 in the Convent of San Francisco in Lima, his final residence, being buried there.

== Selected works ==
- Muchhaska Yupaychaska cachun apu Dios, hinallatak Kollanan Huiñay Virgen Mariapas (1904)
- Vocabulario políglota incaico (1905), written in conjunction with other members of the Franciscan clergy.
- Vocabulario castellano y keshua del Cuzco, forma parte del Políglota incaico (1905)
- Exhortación pastoral [dirigida] al clero y fieles de su diócesis con motivo de la Santa Cuaresma (1911), in the context of Lent.
- Texto i catecismo de la doctrina cristiana en keshua (1913)
- Carta pastoral (1914), in the context of the Feast of the Sacred Heart.
- Florilegio incaico (1920), prayer book.
- Rosicler incaico (1920), collection of religious songs in Quechua.
- Texto y catecismo de la doctrina cristiana en Keshua (1947), posthumous edition revised by Salvador Herrera Pinto, O.F.M.
- Catecismo de la doctrina cristiana en Kechua: oraciones para la Santa Misa (1961), second posthumous publication.

== See also ==
- Roman Catholic Archdiocese of Cuzco
- House of Castro
