= Bernhard Kühnel =

German-born Peruvian Roman Catholic bishop (born 1927)

The Most Reverend Bernhard Kühnel M.S.C.
- Prelate Emeritus of Territorial Prelature of Caravelí
- Church: Catholic Church
- Diocese: Territorial Prelature of Caravelí
- Appointed: 26 January 1983
- Term ended: 18 June 2005
- Predecessor: Friedrich Kaiser, M.S.C.
- Successor: Juan Carlos Vera Plasencia, M.S.C.

Orders
- Ordination: 6 August 1955
- Consecration: 27 April 1983 by Federico Richter Prada, O.F.M.

Personal details
- Born: Bernhard Franz Kühnel; 4 December 1927 (age 98) Ludwigsdorf, Province of Silesia, Weimar Republic
- Denomination: Catholic

Bernhard Franz Kühnel Langer, M.S.C. (born 4 December 1927) is a German-born Roman Catholic prelate, who served as the Prelate of the Territorial Prelature of Caravelí in Peru from 1983 to 2005. A member of the Missionaries of the Sacred Heart of Jesus (M.S.C.).

== Early life and priesthood ==
Bernhard Franz Kühnel Langer was born on 4 December 1927 in Ludwigsdorf, then part of the Province of Silesia, Weimar Republic (present-day Poland). After World War II, his family relocated to West Germany. He joined the Missionaries of the Sacred Heart, a Catholic religious congregation dedicated to missionary work and devotion to the Sacred Heart of Jesus. Kühnel was ordained a priest on 6 August 1955. In 1960, he was sent as a missionary to South America, where he became involved in ecclesiastical work in the Territorial Prelature of Caravelí in southern Peru.

== Episcopal ministry ==
In the early 1970s, following the death of the previous vicar apostolic, Kühnel served as the vicar capitular and administrator of Caravelí, until Pope John Paul II appointed him Prelate of Caravelí on 26 January 1983, and he received episcopal consecration on 27 April 1983 from Federico Richter Prada, O.F.M.

During his episcopate, Kühnel emphasized pastoral care, catechist formation, and support for mission activities in the largely rural prelature. He conducted numerous pastoral visits throughout the territory and worked closely with clergy, religious, and laity.

Pope Benedict XVI accepted his resignation on 18 June 2005 upon reaching the canonical retirement age for bishops. As Prelate Emeritus, Kühnel continued to assist in pastoral work, including parish ministry.

== Legacy ==
Kühnel's decades of missionary service have been recognized by both church authorities and local civic leaders. In August 2021, a thanksgiving event was held at the Cathedral of Caravelí to honor his years of ministry before he moved to Lima to join the M.S.C. community there.
