= Mateo Pinello =

Peruvian Roman Catholic prelate

Most Reverend Mateo Pinello
- Bishop of Cusco
- Church: Catholic Church
- Diocese: Diocese of Cusco
- In office: 1565–1569
- Predecessor: Francisco Ramírez
- Successor: Sebastián Lartaún

Personal details
- Died: 1569 Cuzco Peru

Mateo Pinello (died 1569) was a Roman Catholic prelate who served as Bishop of Cuzco (1565–1569).

== Biography ==
On 19 Jan 1565, Mateo Pinello was appointed during the papacy of Pope Pius IV as Bishop of Cusco. He served as Bishop of Cusco until his death in 1569.

== External links and additional sources ==
- Cheney, David M. "Archdiocese of Cuzco". Catholic-Hierarchy.org. (for Chronology of Bishops) ^{[self-published]}
- Chow, Gabriel. "Metropolitan Archdiocese of Cusco (Peru)". GCatholic.org. (for Chronology of Bishops) ^{[self-published]}

Catholic Church titles
Preceded by Francisco Ramirez (bishop)	Bishop of Cusco; 1565–1569	Succeeded by Sebastián Lartaún
