= Juan Antonio Ugarte Pérez =

Peruvian clergyman and auxiliary bishop

- Archbishop Emeritus of Cuzco
- Church: Catholic Church
- Archdiocese: Archdiocese of Cusco
- In office: 29 November 2003 – 28 October 2014
- Predecessor: Alcides Mendoza Castro
- Successor: Richard Daniel Alarcón Urrutia
- Previous posts: Prelate of Yauyos (1997-2003); Auxiliary Bishop of Yauyos (1991-1997); Auxiliary Bishop of Cusco (1986-1991); Titular Bishop of Castrum (1983-1997); Auxiliary Bishop of Abancay (1983-1986)

Orders
- Ordination: 27 August 1967
- Consecration: 2 October 1983 by Mario Tagliaferri

Personal details
- Born: 23 September 1938 (age 88) Lima, Peru

Juan Antonio Ugarte Pérez (born 23 September 1938 in Lima) is a Peruvian Roman Catholic prelate who served as an auxiliary bishop for the Roman Catholic Diocese of Abancay, and later for Cuzco and Yauyos. He became ordained in 1967. He was appointed bishop in 1983. He retired in 2014.
