= Sebastián Lartaún =

The Most Reverend Sebastián Lartaún
- Bishop of Cusco
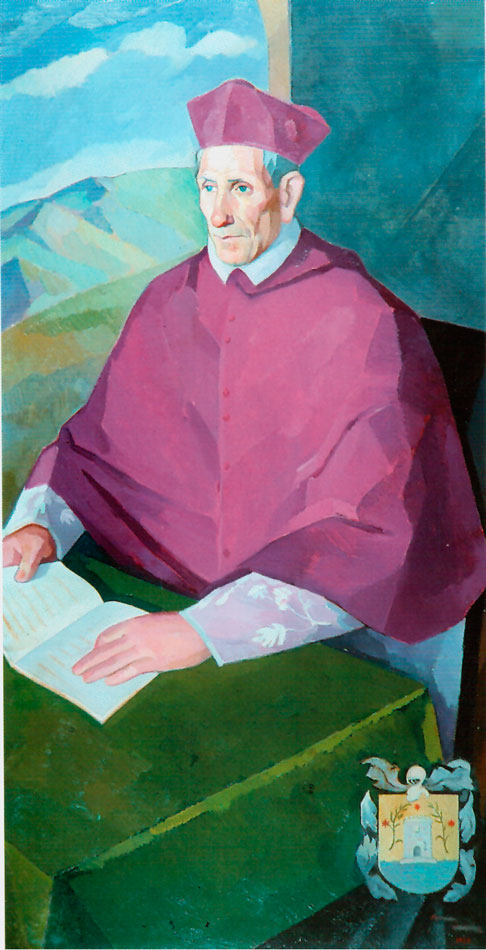
- Painting of Sebastián Lartaún
- Church: Catholic Church
- Diocese: Diocese of Cuzco
- In office: 1570–1583
- Predecessor: Mateo Pinello
- Successor: Gregorio de Montalvo Olivera

Orders
- Consecration: 12 August 1571 by Diego Ramírez Sedeño de Fuenleal

Personal details
- Died: 9 October 1583 Cuzco, Peru

Sebastián Lartaún (died 9 October 1583) was a Roman Catholic prelate who served as Bishop of Cuzco (1570–1583).

== Biography ==
On 4 September 1570, Sebastián Lartaún was appointed Bishop of Cusco during the papacy of Pope Pius V. On 12 August 1571, he was consecrated bishop by Diego Ramírez Sedeño de Fuenleal, Bishop of Pamplona, with Alfonso Merchante de Valeria, Titular Bishop of Sidon, and Gonzalo Herrera Olivares, Titular Bishop of Laodicea in Phrygia, serving as co-consecrators. He served as Bishop of Cuzco until his death on 9 October 1583.

While bishop, he was the principal co-consecrator of Alfonso Guerra, Bishop of Paraguay (1582).

== External links and additional sources ==
- Cheney, David M. "Archdiocese of Cuzco". Catholic-Hierarchy.org. (for Chronology of Bishops) ^{[self-published]}
- Chow, Gabriel. "Metropolitan Archdiocese of Cusco (Peru)". GCatholic.org. (for Chronology of Bishops) ^{[self-published]}

Catholic Church titles
Preceded by Mateo Pinello	Bishop of Cusco; 1570–1583	Succeeded by Gregorio de Montalvo Olivera
