= Ciro Quispe López =

Peruvian Roman-Catholic bishop

Most Reverend Ciro Quispe López
- Bishop of Juli
- Church: Roman Catholic Church
- Metropolis: Roman Catholic Archdiocese of Arequipa
- Diocese: Territorial Prelature of Juli
- Installed: 15 November 2018
- Term ended: 24 September 2025
- Predecessor: José María Ortega Trinidad

Orders
- Ordination: 30 November 2001
- Consecration: 15 December 2018 by Nicola Girasoli

Personal details
- Born: 20 October 1973 (age 52) Cuzco, Peru
- Education: Pontifical Gregorian University; Regina Apostolorum Academy; Pontifical University of Saint Thomas Aquinas
- Coat of arms

Ciro Quispe López (born 20 October 1973) served as the Bishop-Prelate of the Territorial Prelature of Juli in Peru. He resigned in September 2025 after being accused of sexual assault and financial mismanagement, though he denies the allegations.

== Early life and education ==
Ciro was born in Cuzco, Peru on 20 October 1973. He studied at Saint Anthony the Abbot Seminary, then he studied at Regina Apostolorum Athenaeum and at the Angelicum University. He also holds a licentiate and doctorate in biblical theology from the Pontifical Gregorian University in Rome.

== Priesthood ==
On 30 November 2001 Ciro received his priestly ordination. He was incardinated in the archdiocese of Cuzco. He was serving as director of studies in Saint Anthony the Abbot Seminary.

== Episcopate ==
On 15 November 2018, Pope Francis appointed Ciro as Prelate of Juli, Peru. His episcopal ordination was on 15 Dec 2018 at San Pedro Apostol Cathedral, Juli, Peru. The principal consecrator was Nicola Girasoli and principal co-consecrators were Archbishop Héctor Miguel Cabrejos Vidarte and Archbishop Richard Daniel Alarcón Urrutia.

=== Misconduct ===
On 24 September 2025 it was announced that the Holy See had accepted Ciro's resignation. In 2024 it was announced that an investigation had been launched accusing Ciro of sexual misconduct with women and financial mismanagement. The Holy See investigation uncovered voice notes, photos, and videos exchanged with multiple women, some of whom allegedly clashed upon discovering his other relationships. Quispe López denied all accusations, calling them part of a “defamation campaign by dark hands.”
