= Bellavista District, Sullana =

Coordinates: 4.8901°S 80.6807°W

Bellavista
- District
- Interactive map of Bellavista
- Country: Peru
- Region: Piura
- Province: Sullana
- Founded: November 9, 1954
- Capital: Bellavista

Government
  - Mayor: José Hildebrando Crisanto Vilela

Area
  - Total: 3.09 km^{2} (1.19 sq mi)
- Elevation: 40 m (130 ft)

Population (2005 census)
  - Total: 35,908
  - Density: 11,600/km^{2} (30,100/sq mi)
- Time zone: UTC-5 (PET)
- UBIGEO: 200602

Bellavista District is one of eight districts of the province Sullana in Peru.
