= Juan Antonio Falcón =

Peruvian Roman Catholic prelate

- Bishop of Cuzco
- Church: Catholic Church
- Archdiocese: Cuzco
- Installed: 1892
- Term ended: 1909
- Predecessor: Pedro José Tordoya
- Successor: José Gregorio Castro

Orders
- Ordination: June 14, 1862 by José de Goyeneche

Personal details
- Born: June 12, 1838 Lima, North Peru
- Died: May 1, 1909 (aged 70) Cuzco, Peru
- Buried: Cathedral of Cuzco
- Denomination: Roman Catholicism

Juan Antonio Falcón Iturrizaga (1838–1909) was a Peruvian Roman Catholic prelate who served as Bishop of Cusco from 1892 to 1909.

== Biography ==
He was born in Lima on June 12, 1838. He was ordained as a deacon in June 1862 and as a priest in December of that same year by the Archbishop of Lima, José Sebastián de Goyeneche y Barreda. On October 25, 1892, he was selected to be bishop of Cuzco, a see that had been vacant since the death of Bishop Pedro José Tordoya in 1883. The selection was confirmed on January 19, 1893, and on June 29 of that year he was ordained bishop by the Archbishop of Amasea José Macchi. He occupied the episcopal chair of Cuzco for 18 years until his death on May 1, 1909. He is buried in the crypt of the Cathedral of Cuzco.

During his administration, the support he provided to the Scientific Centre of Cuzco stands out, an academic organisation founded in 1897 whose purpose was to carry out geographical studies of the department of Cuzco to provide them to the Peruvian government. Likewise, he signed the agreement for the arrival of the Salesian Congregation to Cuzco in 1905 for the founding of the Salesian School of Cuzco.

== See also ==
- Roman Catholic Archdiocese of Cuzco
