= Regina Apostolorum Academy =

Private school in Manila, Philippines

Location
- Santa Mesa, Manila; Philippines; 14°35′50″N 121°00′54″E

Information
- Type: Private,
- Motto: Service And Sincerity
- Established: 1996
- Grades: K to 10
- Campus: Urban
- Color: Blue
- Affiliations: MAPSA

Regina Apostolorum Academy is a private non-sectarian school located in Santa Mesa, Manila. The school's name is named after Mary, Queen of Apostles. The school was formerly known as Angelicum School. The director of the school is the Ms. Teresa Tuason and the principal is Ms. Janette Liwanag.
