= José María Ortega Trinidad =

Peruvian bishop (born 1950)

His Excellency Monsignor José María Ortega Trinidad
- Prelate of Juli (emeritus)
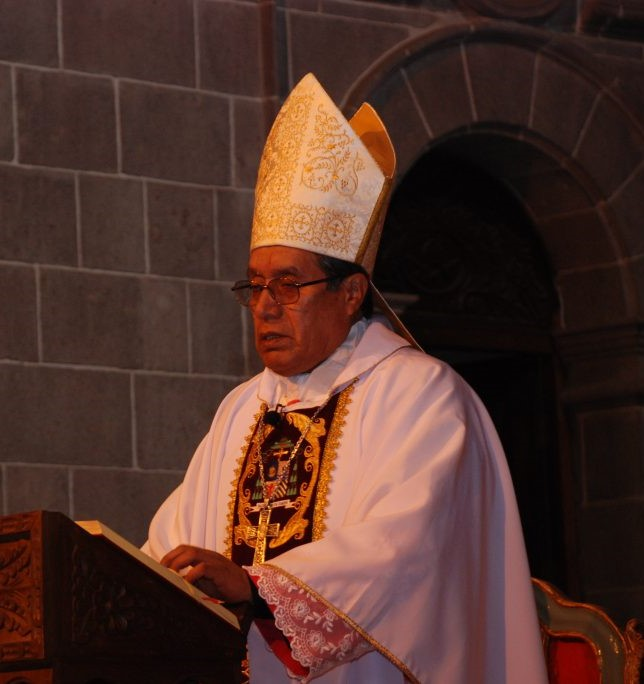
- Church: Roman Catholic Church
- Diocese: Roman Catholic Territorial Prelature of Juli
- Installed: 22 April 2006
- Term ended: 15 November 2018
- Predecessor: Elio Alevi Pérez Tapia
- Successor: Ciro Quispe López

Orders
- Ordination: 25 June 1978
- Consecration: 1 July 2006 by Juan Luis Cipriani Thorne

Personal details
- Born: 30 December 1950 (age 74) Oyón Province, Peru
- Coat of arms

José María Ortega Trinidad (born 30 December 1950) is a Peruvian Roman Catholic prelate who is Bishop Emeritus of the Roman Catholic Territorial Prelature of Juli. He was appointed to the position on 22 April 2006, and was consecrated on 1 July that same year. He resigned on 15 November 2018 and was succeeded by Ciro Quispe López.
