= Territorial Prelature of Caravelí =

Roman Catholic territorial prelature in Peru

Territorial Prelature of Caravelí Praelatura Territorialis Caraveliensis

Location
- Country: Peru
- Ecclesiastical province: Ayacucho

Statistics
- Area: 29,229 km^{2} (11,285 sq mi)
- Population: Total; Catholics: (as of 2004); 115,000; 105,000 (91.3%)

Information
- Rite: Latin Rite

Current leadership
- Bishop: Francisco Castro Lalupú
- Bishops emeritus: Bernhard Franz Kühnel Langer, M.S.C.

The Territorial Prelature of Caravelí (Latin: Praelatura Territorialis Caraveliensis) is a Roman Catholic territorial prelature (pre-diocesan jurisdiction) in the ecclesiastical province of the Metropolitan of Ayacucho in southern Peru.

Its cathedral episcopal see is located in the city of Caravelí.

== History ==
The Territorial Prelature of Caravelí was established on 14 December 1996, on territories split off from the Metropolitan Archdiocese of Ayacucho and its own Metropolitan, the Archdiocese of Arequipa.

== Statistics ==
As per 2014, it pastorally served 119,754 Catholics (82.9% of 144,370 total) on 30,000 km^{2} in 22 parishes and 5 missions with 13 priests (9 diocesan, 4 religious), 60 lay religious (6 brothers, 54 sisters) and 6 seminarians.

== Episcopal ordinaries ==
(all Roman rite, so far Europeans and/or members of a Latin missionary congregation)

Territorial Bishop-Prelates of Caravelí

- Federico Kaiser Depel, Sacred Heart Missionaries (M.S.C.) (°Germany) (21 November 1957 – retired 25 May 1971), Titular Bishop of Berrhœa (29 October 1963 – death 26 September 1993)
- Bernhard Franz Kühnel Langer, M.S.C. (°Poland) (26 January 1983 – retired 18 June 2005)
- Juan Carlos Vera Plasencia, M.S.C. (first native incumbent) (18 June 2005 – 16 July 2014), next stayed on as Apostolic Administrator of Caravelí (16 July 2014 – 27 May 2017) a while when appointed Military Ordinary of the Peru (16 July 2014 – ...) by Pope Francis
- Reinhold Nann (°Germany) (27 May 2017 – 1 July 2024), no previous prelature
- Ricardo Augusto Rodríguez Álvarez, Apostolic Administrator (1 July 2024 - 25 May 2026)
- Francisco Castro Lalupú (since 25 May 2026)

== See also ==
- List of Catholic dioceses in Peru

== Sources and external links ==
- GCatholic.org, with Google satellite photo - data for all sections
- Catholic Hierarchy
