= Territorial Prelature of Chuquibambilla =

Roman Catholic territorial prelature in Peru

Territorial Prelature of Chuquibambilla Praelatura Territorialis Chuquibambillensis

Catholic

Location
- Country: Peru
- Metropolitan: Cuzco

Statistics
- Area: 7,724 km^{2} (2,982 sq mi)
- Population: Total; Catholics: (as of 2004); 83,000; 80,000 (96.4%)

Information
- Rite: Latin Rite

Current leadership
- Prelate: Wilder Alberto Vásquez Saldaña, O.S.A.

The Territorial Prelature of Chuquibambilla (Latin: Praelatura Territorialis Chuquibambillensis) is a Roman Catholic territorial prelature located in the city of Chuquibambilla in the ecclesiastical province of Cuzco in Peru.

== History ==
- On April 26, 1968, the Territorial Prelature of Chuquibambilla was established from the Diocese of Abancay

== Ordinaries ==
- Prelates of Chuquibambilla (Roman rite)
  - Lorenzo Miccheli Filippetti, O.S.A. (August 12, 1976 – July 16, 1986)
  - Domenico Berni Leonardi, O.S.A. (March 29, 1989 – April 24, 2018)
  - Edinson Edgardo Farfán Córdova, O.S.A. (April 24, 2018 – December 7, 2019), Apostolic Administrator; (December 7, 2019 – Feb14, 2024)
  - de:Wilder Alberto Vásquez Saldaña. O.S.A (April 5, 2025 - present)
