= Territorial Prelature of Juli =

Roman Catholic territorial prelature in Peru

Territorial Prelature of Juli Praelatura Territorialis Iuliensis

Catholic
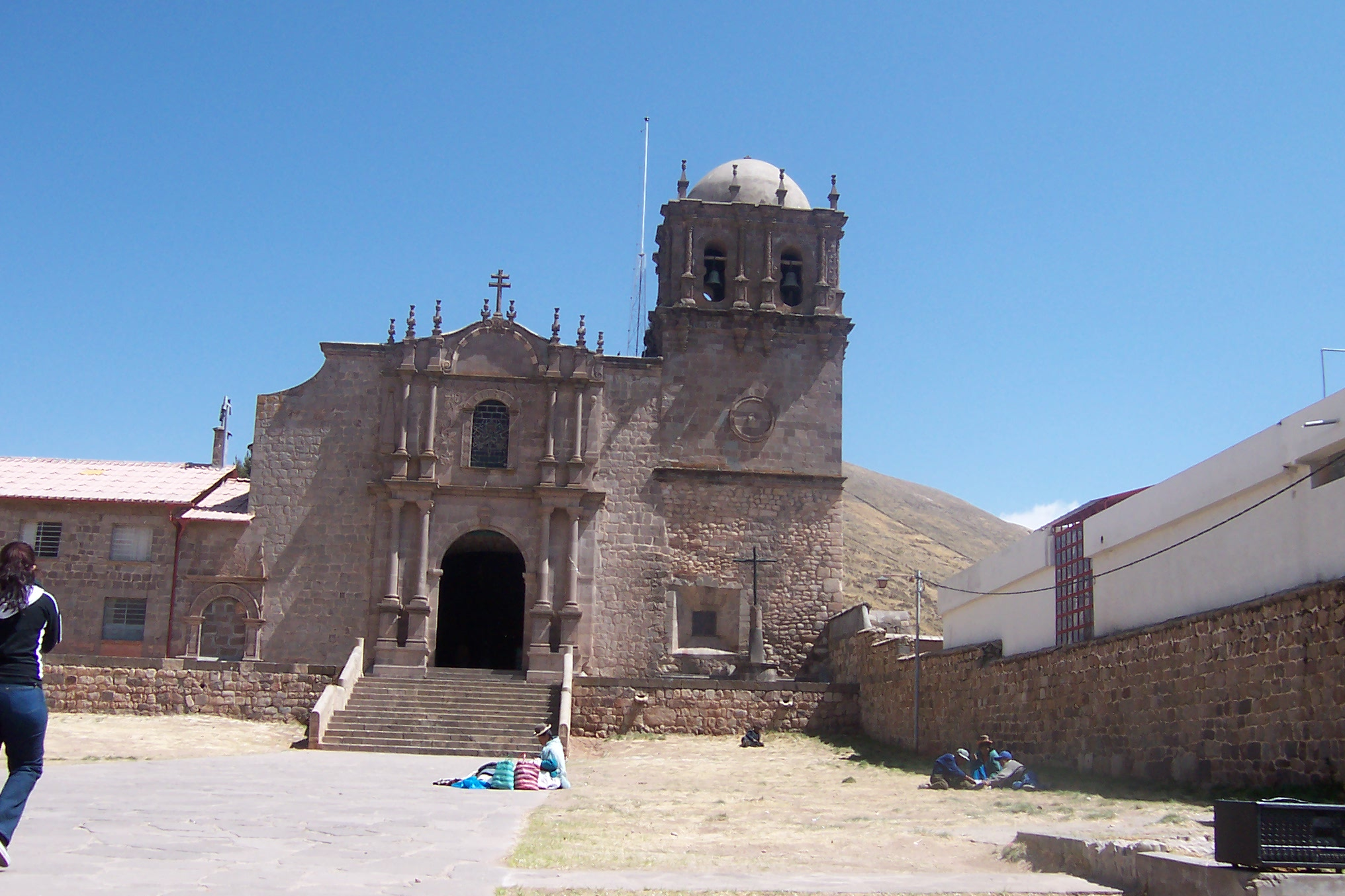
- Cathedral of St. Peter

Location
- Country: Peru
- Metropolitan: Arequipa

Statistics
- Area: 9,920 km^{2} (3,830 sq mi)
- Population: Total; Catholics: (as of 2019); 189,819; 161,311 (85.0%)

Information
- Rite: Latin Rite
- Cathedral: Catedral San Pedro

Current leadership
- Bishop: Vacant
- Bishops emeritus: Raimundo Revoredo Ruiz, C.M. José María Ortega Trinidad

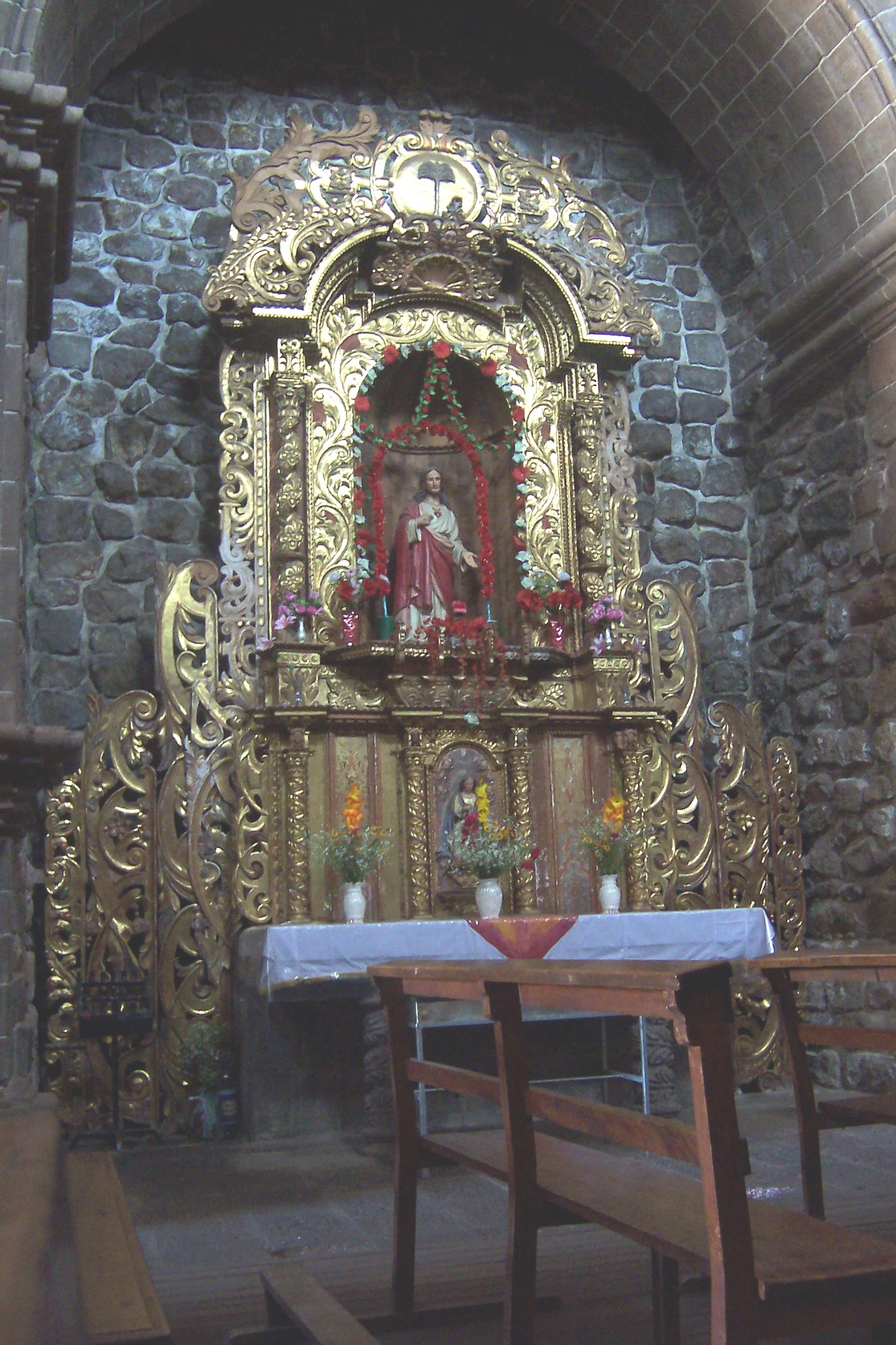
A side altar in Juli Cathedral

The Territorial Prelature of Juli (Latin: Praelatura Territorialis Iuliensis) is a Roman Catholic territorial prelature in the city of Juli in the ecclesiastical province of Arequipa in Peru.

== History ==
On 3 August 1957, the Territorial Prelature of Juli was established from the Diocese of Puno. On 3 April 2019 from its and the Roman Catholic Territorial Prelature of Ayaviri was established the Roman Catholic Territorial Prelature of Santiago Apóstol de Huancané

== Ordinaries ==
- Prelates of Juli (Roman rite)
  - Edward L. Fedders, M.M. (3 August 1957 – 11 March 1973)
  - Albert I. Koenigsknecht, M.M. (11 February 1974 – 9 February 1986)
  - Raimundo Revoredo Ruiz, C.M. (25 November 1988 – 29 May 1999)
  - Elio Alevi Pérez Tapia, S.D.B. (19 April 2001 – 25 June 2005)
  - José María Ortega Trinidad (22 April 2006 – 15 November 2018)
  - Ciro Quispe López (15 Nov 2018– 24 September 2025)
