= Diocese of Abancay =

Catholic ecclesial territory in Peru

Coordinates: 13.516276°S 71.977926°W

Diocese of Abancay Dioecesis Abancaiensis

Catholic
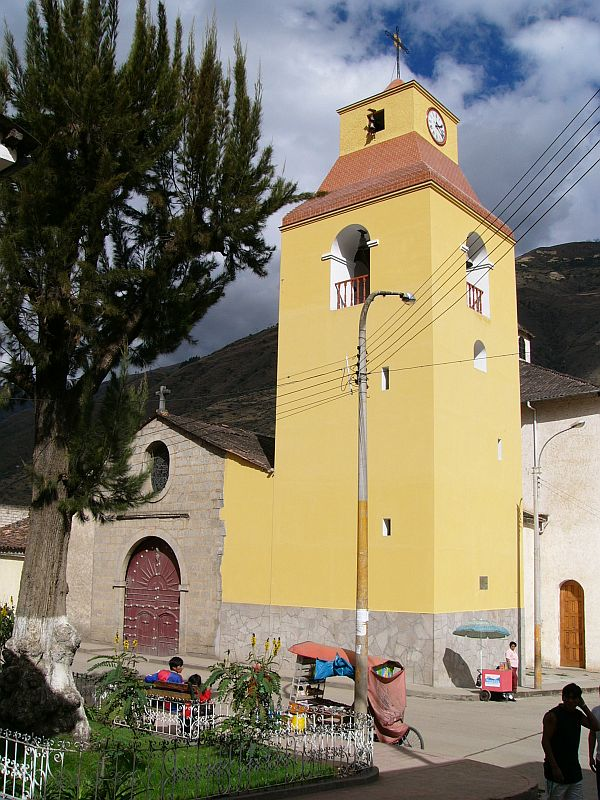
- The cathedral

Location
- Country: Peru
- Ecclesiastical province: Cuzco

Statistics
- Area: 12,950 km^{2} (5,000 sq mi)
- Population: Total; Catholics: (as of 2005); 335,628; 310,628 (92.6%)
- Parishes: 17

Information
- Denomination: Catholic Church
- Sui iuris church: Latin Church
- Rite: Roman Rite
- Secular priests: 58

Current leadership
- Pope: Leo XIV
- Bishop: Gilberto Gómez González

The Diocese of Abancay is a Latin Church ecclesiastical jurisdiction or diocese of the Catholic Church in Peru. It was erected on April 28, 1958 from the territory of the Archdiocese of Cuzco with Alcides Mendoza Castro being made its first bishop. It is a suffragan in the ecclesiastical province to the metropolitan Archdiocese of Cuzco.

Gilberto Gómez González has been the bishop of the diocese since 2009.

== Bishops ==
=== Ordinaries ===
- Alcides Mendoza Castro (1962–1967), appointed Archbishop (personal title) of Peru, Military
- Enrique Pélach y Feliú (1968–1992)
- Isidro Sala Ribera (1992–2009)
- Gilberto Gómez González (2009– )

=== Coadjutor bishop ===
- Isidro Sala Ribera (1990-1992)

=== Auxiliary bishops ===
- Alcides Mendoza Castro (1958-1962), appointed Bishop here
- Juan Antonio Ugarte Pérez (1983-1986), appointed Auxiliary Bishop of Cuzco
- Isidro Sala Ribera (1986-1990), appointed Coadjutor here
- Gilberto Gómez González (2001-2009), appointed Bishop here

=== Other priest of this diocese who became bishop ===
- Gabino Miranda Melgarejo, appointed Auxiliary Bishop of Ayacucho o Huamanga in 2004

== Sources ==
- Diocese of Abancay / catholic-hierarchy.com

== See also ==
- List of Roman Catholic dioceses in Peru
