= Military Ordinariate of Peru =

Roman Catholic ecclesiastical jurisdiction in Peru

Military Bishopric of Peru Obispado Castrense del Perú
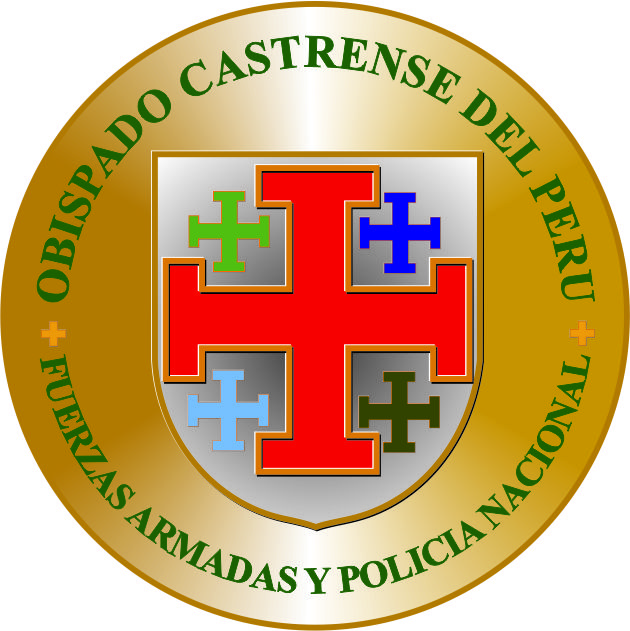

Location
- Country: Peru
- Ecclesiastical province: Immediately exempt to the Holy See

Information
- Denomination: Catholic Church
- Sui iuris church: Latin Church
- Rite: Roman Rite
- Established: 15 May 1943 (81 years ago)

Current leadership
- Pope: Francis
- Bishop: Juan Carlos Vera Plasencia, MSC

The Military Bishopric of Peru (Spanish: Obispado Castrense del Perú) is a Latin Church military ordinariate of the Catholic Church. Immediately exempt to the Holy See, it provides pastoral care to Catholics serving in the Peruvian Armed Forces and their families.

Pope Francis appointed the Bishop Prelate of the Territorial Prelature of Caravelí, Bishop Juan Carlos Vera Plasencia, MSC, as bishop-designate for the Military Ordinariate of Peru on Wednesday, July 16, 2014. The bishop was installed as military ordinary at a later date.

== History ==
It was established as a military vicariate on 15 May 1943, but the first military vicar was not appointed until 13 January 1945. It was elevated to a military ordinariate on 21 July 1986.

== Office holders ==
=== Military vicars ===
- Juan Gualberto Guevara (appointed 13 January 1945 – died 27 November 1954)
- Carlos Maria Jurgens Byrne, C.SS.R. (appointed 7 February 1954 – translated to the Archdiocese of Cuzco 17 December 1956)
- Felipe Santiago Hermosa y Sarmiento, Archbishop (personal title) (appointed 17 December 1956 – retired 1967)
- Alcides Mendoza Castro, Archbishop (personal title) (appointed 12 August 1967 – translated to the Archdiocese of Cuzco 5 October 1983)
- Eduardo Picher Peña (appointed 14 June 1984 – became military ordinary 21 July 1986); see below

=== Military ordinaries ===
- Eduardo Picher Peña (appointed 21 July 1986 – retired 6 February 1996); see above
- Héctor Miguel Cabrejos Vidarte, O.F.M. (appointed 6 February 1996 – translated to the Archdiocese of Trujillo 29 July 1999)
- Salvador Piñeiro García-Calderón (appointed 21 July 2001 – translated to the Archdiocese of Ayacucho 6 August 2011)
- Guillermo Martín Abanto Guzmán (appointed 30 October 2012 – retired July 20, 2013)
- Juan Carlos Vera Plasencia (appointed 16 July 2014 – ); formerly, Bishop Prelate of the Territorial Prelature of Caravelí
