= Diocese of Huancavelica =

Roman Catholic diocese in Peru

Coordinates: 12.7876°S 74.9732°W

Diocese of Huancavélica Dioecesis Huancavelicensis

Catholic
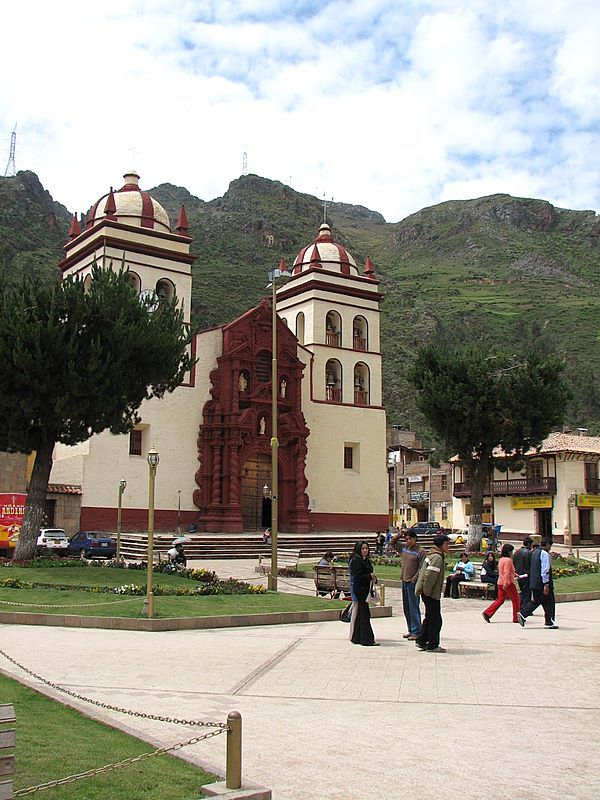
- Cathedral of St. Anthony

Location
- Country: Peru
- Ecclesiastical province: Ayacucho

Statistics
- Area: 21,078 km^{2} (8,138 sq mi)
- Population: Total; Catholics: (as of 2004); 444,829; 406,709 (91.4%)

Information
- Rite: Latin Rite
- Cathedral: Catedral San Antonio

Current leadership
- Pope: Leo XIV
- Bishop: Carlos Alberto Salcedo Ojeda, O.M.I.

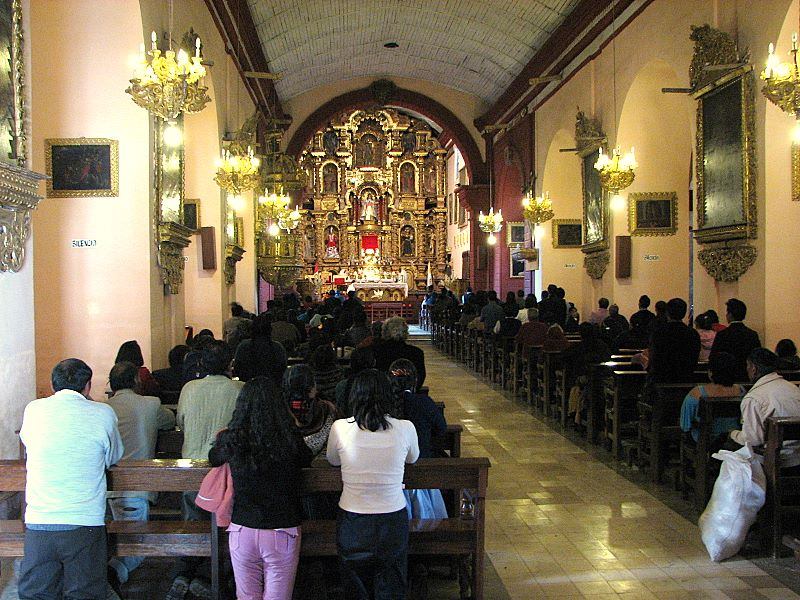
Huancavélica Cathedral

The Roman Catholic Diocese of Huancavelica (Latin: Huancavelicensis) is a diocese located in the city of Huancavélica in the ecclesiastical province of Ayacucho in Peru.

== History ==
On 18 December 1944 Pope Pius XII established as Diocese of Huancavelica from the Diocese of Ayacucho.

== Bishops ==
=== Ordinaries ===
- Alberto Maria Dettmann y Aragón, O.P. (6 July 1945 – 28 June 1948), appointed Bishop of Puno
- Carlos Maria Jurgens Byrne, C.Ss.R. (13 January 1949 – 7 February 1954), appointed Bishop of Peru, Military
- Florencio Coronado Romani, C.Ss.R. (1 March 1956 – 14 January 1982)
- William Dermott Molloy McDermott (14 January 1982 – 18 June 2005)
- Isidro Barrio Barrio (18 June 2005 – 21 May 2021)
- Carlos Alberto Salcedo Ojeda, O.M.I. (21 May 2021 – present)

=== Coadjutor bishop ===
- Isidro Barrio Barrio (2002-2005)

=== Auxiliary bishop ===
- William Dermott Molloy McDermott (1976–1982), appointed Bishop here

== See also ==
- Roman Catholicism in Peru

== Sources ==
- GCatholic.org
- Catholic Hierarchy
