= Apostolic Vicariate of Iquitos =

Catholic missionary jurisdiction in Peru

Apostolic Vicariate of Iquitos Vicariatus Apostolicus Iquitosensis
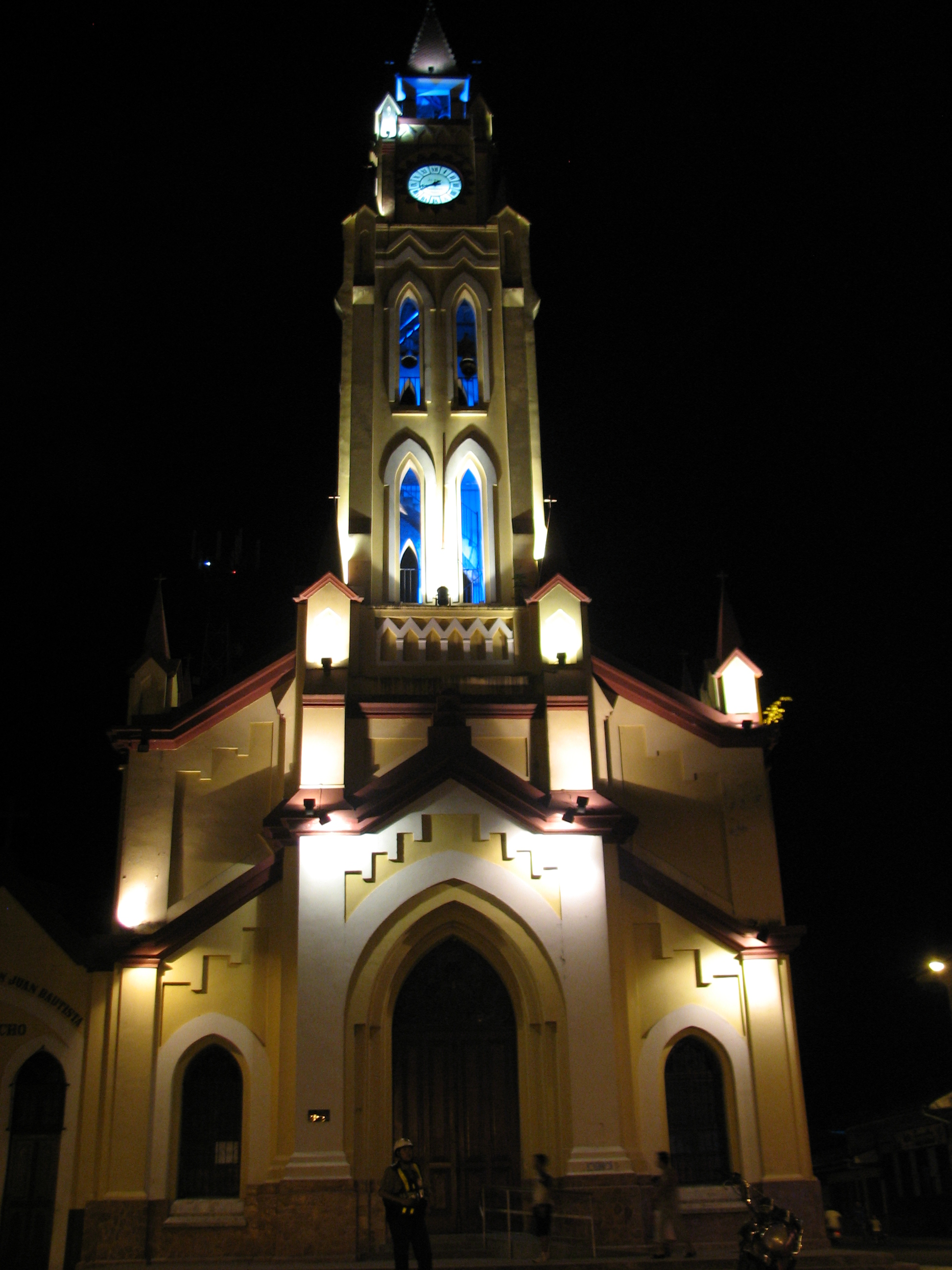
- Cathedral of St. John the Baptist

Location
- Country: Peru
- Metropolitan: Immediately exempt to the Holy See
- Coordinates: 3°42′S 73°12′W

Statistics
- Area: 100,042 km^{2} (38,626 sq mi)
- Population: Total; Catholics: (as of 2004); 951,400; 770,200 (81.0%)

Information
- Denomination: Catholic Church
- Sui iuris church: Latin Church
- Rite: Latin Church
- Established: 13 July 1945 (81 years ago)
- Cathedral: Catedral San Juan Bautista

Current leadership
- Bishop: Miguel Ángel Cadenas Cardo, O.S.A.
- Bishops emeritus: Julián García Centeno, O.S.A.

Map

The Apostolic Vicariate of Iquitos (Latin: Vicariatus Apostolicus Iquitosensis), originally Apostolic Prefecture of San León del Amazonas, is a Latin Church pre-diocesan missionary jurisdiction apostolic vicariate of the Catholic Church in Amazonian northern Peru.

It is immediately exempt to the Holy See and not part of any ecclesiastical province. Its cathedral, the Catedral San Juan Bautista (St. John the Baptist), is in the episcopal see of Iquitos.

== History ==
- Established on 5 February 1900 as the Apostolic Prefecture of San León del Amazonas on territory split off from the Amazonian Peruvian Diocese of Chachapoyas. In June, 1904, Bernardo Calle, the lay brother Miguel Vilajoli, and more than 70 Christians were murdered at a then recently erected mission station, Huabico, in Upper Maranon and the station itself was destroyed.
- Promoted on 22 February 1921 as Apostolic Vicariate (since entitled to a titular bishop) of San León del Amazonas
- Lost territory twice: on 27 February 1921 to establish the Apostolic Prefecture of San Gabriel de la Dolorosa del Marañón and on 13 July 1945 again to establish the Apostolic Prefecture of San José de Amazonas
- Renamed on 1 August 1945 as Apostolic Vicariate of Iquitos (after its see)
- Enjoyed a papal visit by Pope John Paul II in February 1985.

== Bishops ==
=== Ordinaries ===
Missionary members of the Augustinians (O.S.A.)

Apostolic Prefects of San León del Amazonas

- Fr. Paulino Díaz (bishop) (1902–1911)
- Fr. Pedro Prat, (O.S.A.) (1911–1913)
- Fr. Rufino Santos (1914–1916)
- Fr. Sotero Redondo Herrero, O.S.A. (November 1915 – 22 February 1921 see below)

Apostolic Vicars of San León del Amazonas

- Sotero Redondo Herrero, O.S.A., Titular Bishop of Arycanda (see above 22 February 1921 – 24 February 1935)
- Pro-Vicar Apostolic Rosino Ramos (1935–1938)
- Apostolic Administrator Claudio Bravo Moran (1938–1941)

Apostolic Vicars of Iquitos

- José García Pulgar, O.S.A. (21 August 1941 – 31 January 1954); Titular Bishop of Phæna (1938.01.08 – 1941.08.21, but not possessed), then Titular Bishop of Botrys (1941.08.21 – 1954.01.31)
- Angel Rodríguez Gamoneda, O.S.A., Titular Bishop of Gazera (8 May 1955 – 12 June 1967)
- Gabino Peral de la Torre, O.S.A., Titular Bishop of Castellum Ripæ (12 June 1967 – 5 January 1991); previously Coadjutor Apostolic Vicar here 1965.10.14 – 1967.06.12)
- Julián García Centeno, O.S.A., Titular Bishop of Girus (5 January 1991 – 2 February 2011); previously Auxiliary Bishop here (1989.06.19 – 1991.01.05)
- Miguel Olaortúa Laspra, O.S.A. (2 February 2011 – 1 November 2019)
- Miguel Ángel Cadenas Cardo, O.S.A. (15 May 2021 – present)

=== Coadjutor vicar apostolic ===
- Gabino Peral de la Torre, O.S.A. (1965-1967)

=== Auxiliary bishop ===
- Julián García Centeno, O.S.A. (1989-1991), appointed Apostolic Vicar here
