= Territorial Prelature of Yauyos =

Roman Catholic territorial prelature in Peru

Coordinates: 13°04′40″S 76°23′12″W

Territorial Prelature of Yauyos Praelatura Territorialis Yauyosensis

Catholic

Location
- Country: Peru
- Ecclesiastical province: Lima

Statistics
- Area: 15,516 km^{2} (5,991 sq mi)
- Population: Total; Catholics: (as of 2004); 214,523; 208,088 (97.0%)

Information
- Rite: Latin Rite
- Cathedral: Catedral San Vicente Mártir

Current leadership
- Bishop: Ricardo García García

The Territorial Prelature of Yauyos (Latin: Praelatura Territorialis Yauyosensis) is a Roman Catholic territorial prelature located in the city of Yauyos in the ecclesiastical province of Lima in Peru.

== History ==
- On 12 April 1957, the Territorial Prelature of Yauyos was established from the Metropolitan Archdiocese of Lima

== Bishops ==
=== Ordinaries ===
- Prelates of Yauyos (Roman rite)
  - Ignacio María de Orbegozo y Goicoechea (April 12, 1957 – April 26, 1968), appointed Bishop of Chiclayo
  - Luis Sánchez-Moreno Lira (April 26, 1968 – March 2, 1996), appointed Archbishop of Arequipa
  - Juan Antonio Ugarte Pérez (March 15, 1997 – November 29, 2003), appointed Archbishop of Cuzco
  - Ricardo García García (October 12, 2004 – Present)

=== Auxiliary bishop ===
- Juan Antonio Ugarte Pérez (1991-1997), appointed Prelate here

=== Other priest of this prelature who became bishop ===
- José María Ortega Trinidad, appointed Prelate of Juli in 2006
