= Oued El Hatech =

Oued El Hatech is a wadi\river of central Tunisia. The Oued El Hatech which rises close to the Algerian border on the west side of Kasserine Governorate and flows through Sidi Bouzid Governorate. Seasonal salt lakes lie in its catchment including the Sebkhet en Noual and Sebkhet Mecheguia. The natural landscape is semi-arid with irrigated areas used for cultivation and grazing. The climate is temperate at night, except in unusual overcast conditions and precipitation is confined largely to winter months/early spring.
