= Diocese of Sicuani =

Roman Catholic diocese in Peru

Diocese of Sicuani Dioecesis Sicuanensis

Catholic

Location
- Country: Peru
- Metropolitan: Cusco

Statistics
- Area: 15,440 km^{2} (5,960 sq mi)
- Population: Total; Catholics: (as of 2004); 274,000; 234,000 (85.4%)

Information
- Sui iuris church: Latin Church
- Rite: Roman Rite

Current leadership
- Bishop: Pedro Alberto Bustamante López

The Roman Catholic Diocese of Sicuani (Latin: Dioecesis Sicuanensis) is a Roman Catholic diocese located in the city of Sicuani in the ecclesiastical province of Cusco in Peru.

== History ==
On 10 January 1959, the Territorial Prelature of Sicuani was established from the Metropolitan Archdiocese of Cusco. It was elevated to the status of diocese on September 29, 2020.

== Ordinaries ==
- Prelates of Sicuani (Latin Church)
  - Nevin William Hayes, O. Carm. (January 10, 1959 – November 7, 1970)
  - Alban Quinn, O. Carm. (July 12, 1971 – July 1999), Apostolic Administrator, and not consecrated bishop
  - Miguel La Fay Bardi, O. Carm. (July 26, 1999 – July 10, 2013)
  - Pedro Alberto Bustamante López (10 July 10, 2013 – 29 September 2020 see below)
- Bishops of Sicuani (Latin Church)
  - Pedro Alberto Bustamante López (see above 29 September 2020 – )
