= Apostolic Vicariate of San José de Amazonas =

Latin Catholic ecclesiastical jurisdiction in Peru

Apostolic Vicariate of San José de Amazonas Apostolicus Vicariatus Sancti Iosephi de Amazones

Location
- Country: Peru

Statistics
- Area: 155,000 km^{2} (60,000 sq mi)
- Population: Total; Catholics: (as of 2024); 210,000; 154,000 (73.3%)
- Parishes: 11

Information
- Denomination: Catholic Church
- Sui iuris church: Latin Church
- Rite: Roman Rite
- Established: 13 July 1945 (80 years ago)

Current leadership
- Pope: Leo XIV
- Vicar Apostolic: sede vacante
- Bishops emeritus: Alberto Campos Hernández, O.F.M.

The Vicariate Apostolic of San José de Amazonas (Latin: Apostolicus Vicariatus Sancti Iosephi de Amazones) Latin Church apostolic vicariate of the Catholic Church located in the town of Indiana in Peru.

== History ==
On 13 July 1945 Pope Pius XII established the Prefecture Apostolic of San José de Amazonas from the Vicariate Apostolic of San León del Amazonas. The prefecture was elevated to a Vicariate Apostolic on 3 July 1955.

== Bishops ==
=== Ordinaries ===
- José Damase Laberge, O.F.M. † (4 Jan 1946 – 25 Dec 1968)
- Lorenzo Rodolfo Guibord Lévesque, O.F.M. † (29 May 1969 – 17 Jan 1998)
- Alberto Campos Hernández, O.F.M. (17 Jan 1998 – 8 Aug 2011)
- José Javier Travieso Martín, C.M.F. (1 Nov 2014 – 3 Feb 2026)

=== Auxiliary bishop ===
- Lorenzo Rodolfo Guibord Lévesque, O.F.M. † (1967-1969), appointed Vicar Apostolic here

== See also ==
- Roman Catholicism in Peru
