= Salvador Piñeiro García-Calderón =

Peruvian Catholic bishop

- Archbishop of Ayacucho
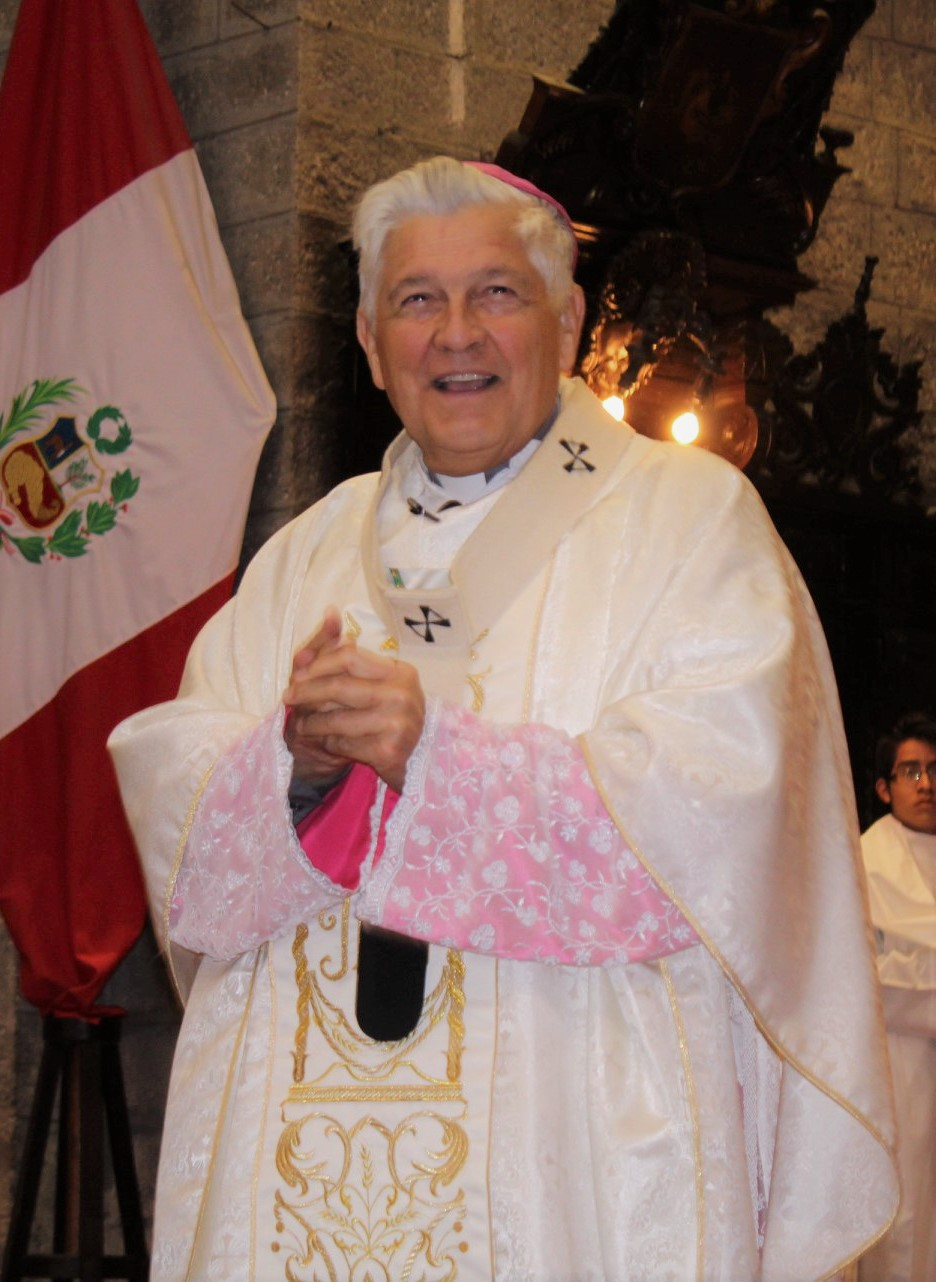
- Piñeiro in 2019
- Church: Catholic Church
- Archdiocese: Ayacucho
- Appointed: 6 August 2011
- Predecessor: Luis Abilio Sebastiani Aguirre
- Previous posts: Bishop of the Military Ordinariate of Peru (2001–2012); Auxiliary Bishop of Lurín (2003–c. 2006)

Orders
- Ordination: 6 May 1973
- Consecration: 2 September 2001 by Juan Luis Cipriani Thorne

Personal details
- Born: 27 January 1949 (age 77) Lima, Peru
- Coat of arms

Salvador Piñeiro García-Calderón (born 27 January 1949) is a Peruvian Roman Catholic prelate who is currently the archbishop of the Roman Catholic Archdiocese of Ayacucho.
