= Armando Brasini =

Italian architect

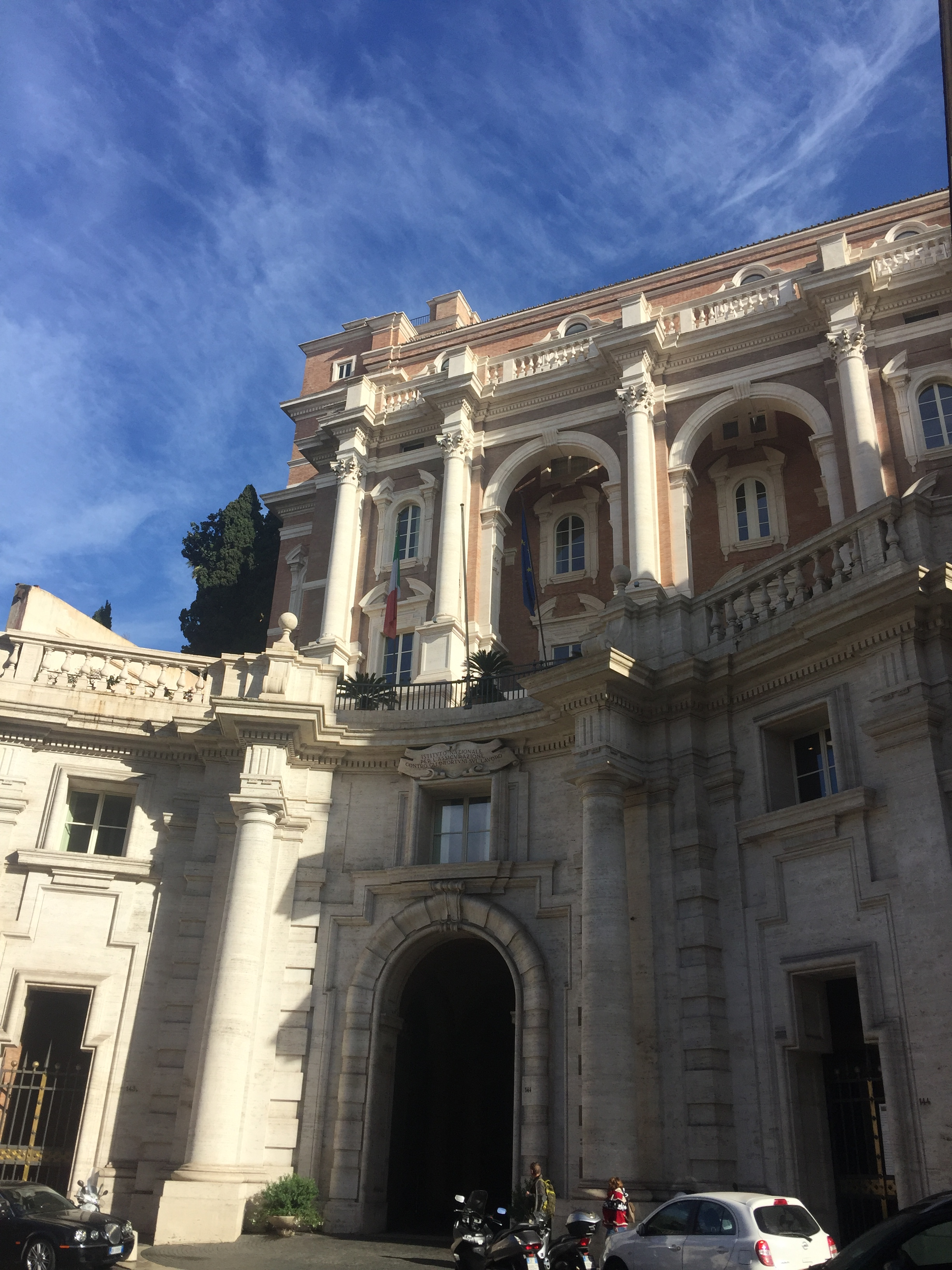
INAIL Building in Rome, designed by Armando Brasini

Armando Brasini (Rome, 21 September 1879 - Rome, 18 February 1965) was a prominent Italian architect and urban designer of the early twentieth century and exemplar of Fascist architecture. His work is notable for its eclectic and visionary style inspired by Ancient Roman architecture, Italian Baroque architecture and Giovanni Battista Piranesi.

== Biography ==
Armando Stefano Ludovico Brasini was born in the Roman district of Tor di Nona from a family of modest background, the son of Augusto Brasini and Rosa Piersigilli. After having successfully attended the Institute of Fine Arts, he started specializing in renovation of old buildings and interior decoration. In 1897-1898 he worked with Raffaello Ojetti on the renovation of the Castello Orsini-Odescalchi in Bracciano for its owner, Prince Baldassarre Odescalchi. In the early 1900s he worked on the decoration of the Roman churches of Santa Teresa and San Camillo de Lellis, both with Tullio Passarelli, and on stucco work in Santa Maria dei Miracoli. In 1912, he teamed with Marcello Piacentini for the winning entry in a competition for the remodeling of Piazza Navona, which was, however, not implemented. In those years he operated from a spacious office in Palazzo dei Piceni in the center of Rome. In 1917 he created stucco decoration in the Palazzo Chigi following its purchase by the Italian state. Immediately after World War I he proposed a colossal memorial to the Battle of Vittorio Veneto, featured a cascade flanked by giant statues, that would have been carved on the nearby Pizzocco mountain. In the early 1920s he worked with Giuseppe Volpi, then Governor of Tripolitania, on the remodeling of Tripoli. There he designed the Savings Bank Building (Palazzo della Cassa di Risparmio, now the country's central bank), the waterfront boulevard (Lungomare Conte Volpi, now Ad-dahra Al-kebira), the renovation of the Red Castle, and the memorial to the Italian conquest (Monumento ai Caduti e alla Vittoria). In 1925-1926, he also produced the first master plan for the expansion of Tirana, where Italian influence was significant at the time. That plan was partly implemented, and elements of Brasini's design still exist in the layout of Skanderbeg Square and in the city's major north–south axis, now Dëshmorët e Kombit Boulevard. In 1929 he was appointed a member of the newly created Royal Academy of Italy.

Brasini also designed sets and costumes for silent movies, including Theodora (1921) and Quo Vadis (1924).

Brasini had a lifelong interest in urban design. In 1925–27, he conceived a project for a remodeling of Rome's center dubbed the "Mussolini Forum" (Italian: Foro Mussolini) which would have entailed the demolition of much of the Campo Marzio, leaving the ancient monuments (Pantheon, Column of Marcus Aurelius, Obelisk of Montecitorio) standing alone in large urban spaces. Brasini's emphasis on facilitating car traffic at the cost of the old city fabric has elicited comparisons with Le Corbusier's 1925 Plan Voisin for Paris, despite the obvious stylistic difference. In 1927, he was commissioned by the Ministry of Public Education to design a master plan for the Flaminio neighborhood, on which he had already worked in 1915. In 1931, he participated in the committee for a new city plan of Rome (Commissione del Piano Regolatore di Roma), and in 1934 he was a member of the jury for the Palazzo Littorio project that would have faced the Basilica of Maxentius across the Via dell'Impero (now Via dei Fori Imperiali).

His prestige projects in Rome included, in the 1920s, the church of the Sacred Heart of Mary in Parioli and the sprawling Complesso del Buon Pastore on Via di Bravetta, and in the 1930s, the seat of Istituto nazionale per l'assicurazione contro gli infortuni sul lavoro buttressing Quirinal Hill, as well as the Ponte Flaminio. He also designed major public buildings in Southern Italy: the Palazzo del Podestà in Foggia (built between 1928 and 1932), and the massive Palazzo della Prefettura in Taranto (built from 1930 to 1934).

Brasini produced designs for a number of major projects that were never built. In 1931 he participated in the competition for the Palace of the Soviets in Moscow. In the 1930s he produced various designs for a colossal Mole Littoria in Rome, intended to celebrate Mussolini's imperial achievements and match Albert Speer's plans for Nazi Berlin. Mussolini did not approve the project, however, due to its high costs and competing projects of EUR. In 1939 he designed a new cathedral for Addis Ababa, and in 1956 a colossal lighthouse intended as a monument to Christianity in the Saxa Rubra neighborhood of Rome.

For the EUR, Brasini in 1938 designed a monumental Forestry Institute named after Alessandro Mussolini, Benito's father, whose construction started in 1940 but was suspended in 1942 for war reasons. The partly built structure was demolished in 1957 and replaced by the General House of the Marist Brothers, in spite of Brasini's attempts to promote alternative design options to save the construction.

Following World War II, Brasini no longer received major commissions in Italy, but he remained involved in the completion of some of his projects, such as the Ponte Flaminio and the Parioli basilica. He produced plans for the city of Riyadh and a royal palace there, at the invitation of the government of Saudi Arabia (1954), and for a bridge over the Strait of Messina (1956-1963). He died in 1965 in the house he had designed for himself on Via Flaminia.

== Assessment ==
Paolo Portoghesi, while acknowledging the "undoubted architectural merits" of Brasini's designs, defines him as "one of the great misfits of twentieth-century architecture" for generally not being "in tune with the spirit of the times," but rather representing "a case of estrangement from that spirit."

== Works ==
- Villa Toeplitz in Varese (1901)
- Monumental entrance to the Zoological Garden in Rome (1909-1911)
- Villino Tabacchi, Rome (1912), demolished
- Villa Flaminia (Via Flaminia 495), part of the Villa Brasini complex (1920-1925)
- Headquarters of the Savings Bank of Tripolitania, Tripoli (1921-1935), now Central Bank of Libya
- Renovation of the Red Castle of Tripoli (1922-1923)
- Waterfront boulevard, now Al-dahra Al-kabira in Tripoli (1922-24)
- War monument in Tripoli (1922-1925), demolished in the 1950s
- Church of the Sacred Heart of Mary (also known as the Parioli Basilica) in Rome (1923-1954)
- Italian Pavilion at the Decorative Arts Exhibition in Paris (1925), demolished after the event
- Central Museum of the Risorgimento inside the Victor Emmanuel II Monument, Rome (with A. Calzavara, 1924–1935)
- Master plan for the Center of Tirana (1925), partly implemented and modified by Gherardo Bosio after 1939
- Regia Accademia Aeronautica, now Comando Aeroporto di Capodichino near Naples (1925-1930), partly destroyed during World War II
- Villa Manzoni on via Cassia in Rome (1928)
- INAIL building, Via IV Novembre in Rome (with Guido Zevi, 1928–1932)
- Palazzo del Podestà in Foggia, now City Hall (1928-1933)
- Palazzo del Governo, now seat of the Province of Taranto (1929-1934)
- Complesso del Buon Pastore in Rome (1929-1934)
- Italian Pavilion at the Paris Colonial Exposition (1931), a smaller-scale reinterpretation of the Severan Basilica in Leptis Magna, demolished after the event's end
- Villa Augusta (Via Flaminia 489), also known as the castellaccio ("ugly castle") for its eclectic style, part of the Villa Brasini complex (1932-35)
- Palazzo della Banca Nazionale del Lavoro in Naples (1933-38)
- Ponte Flaminio in Rome (1939-51)

== Gallery ==
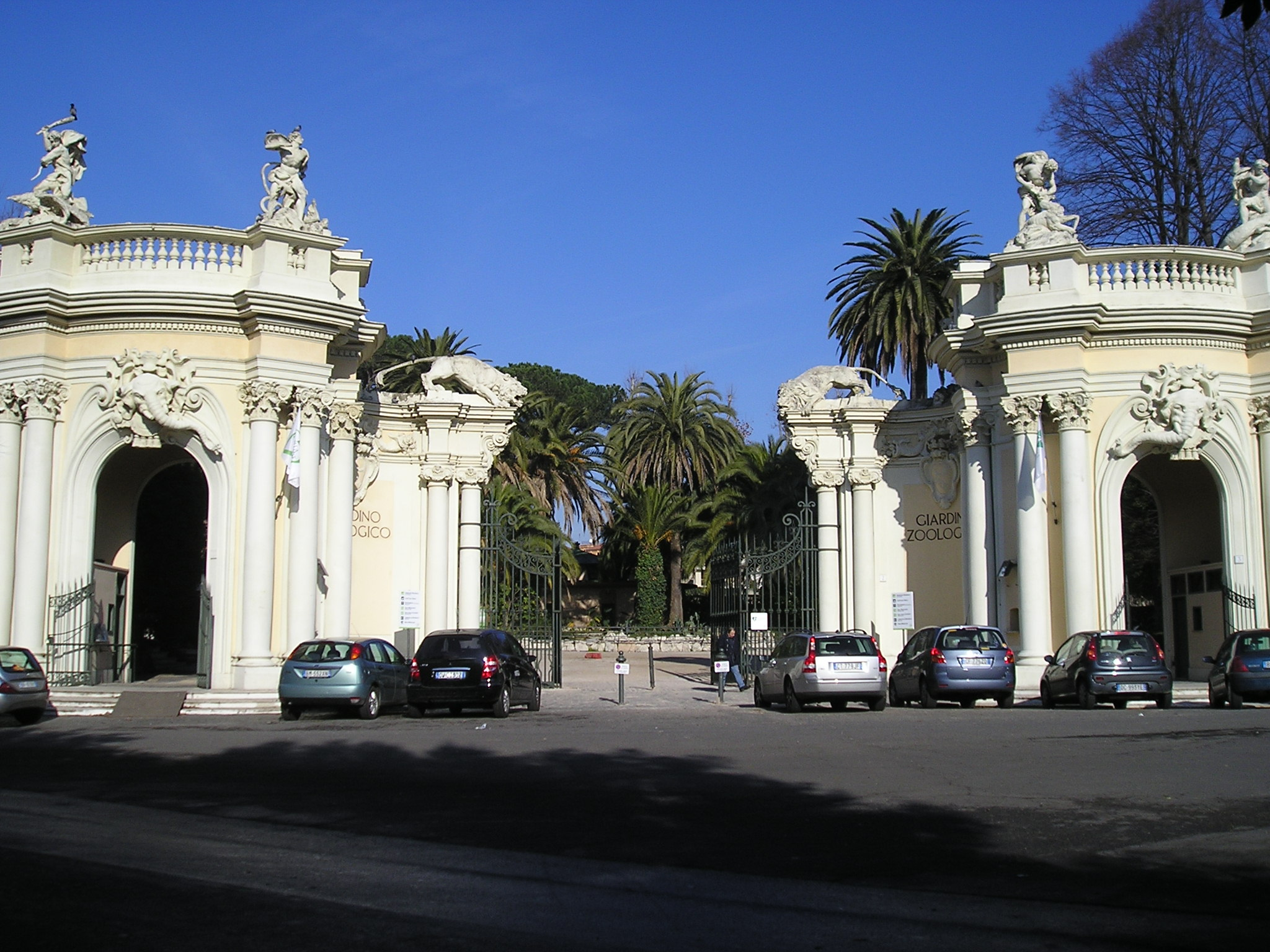
Zoological Garden entrance, Rome

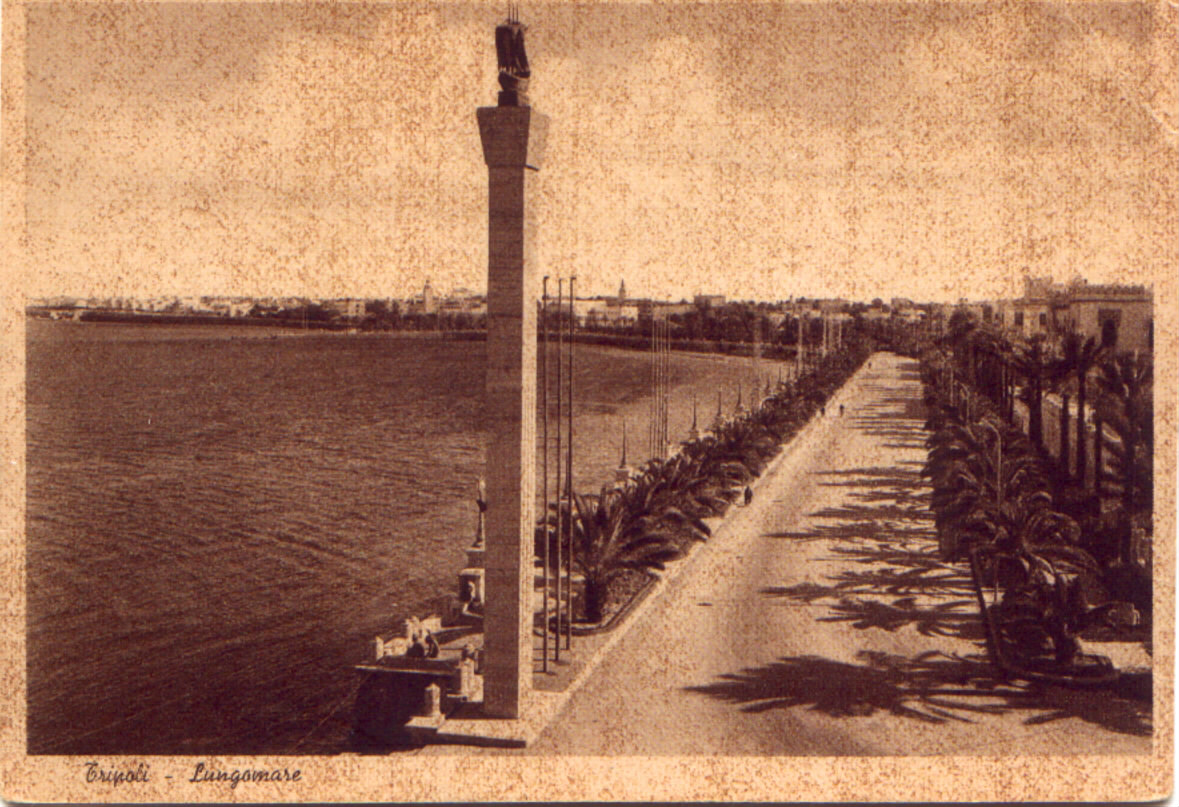
Lungomare Conte Volpi, Tripoli

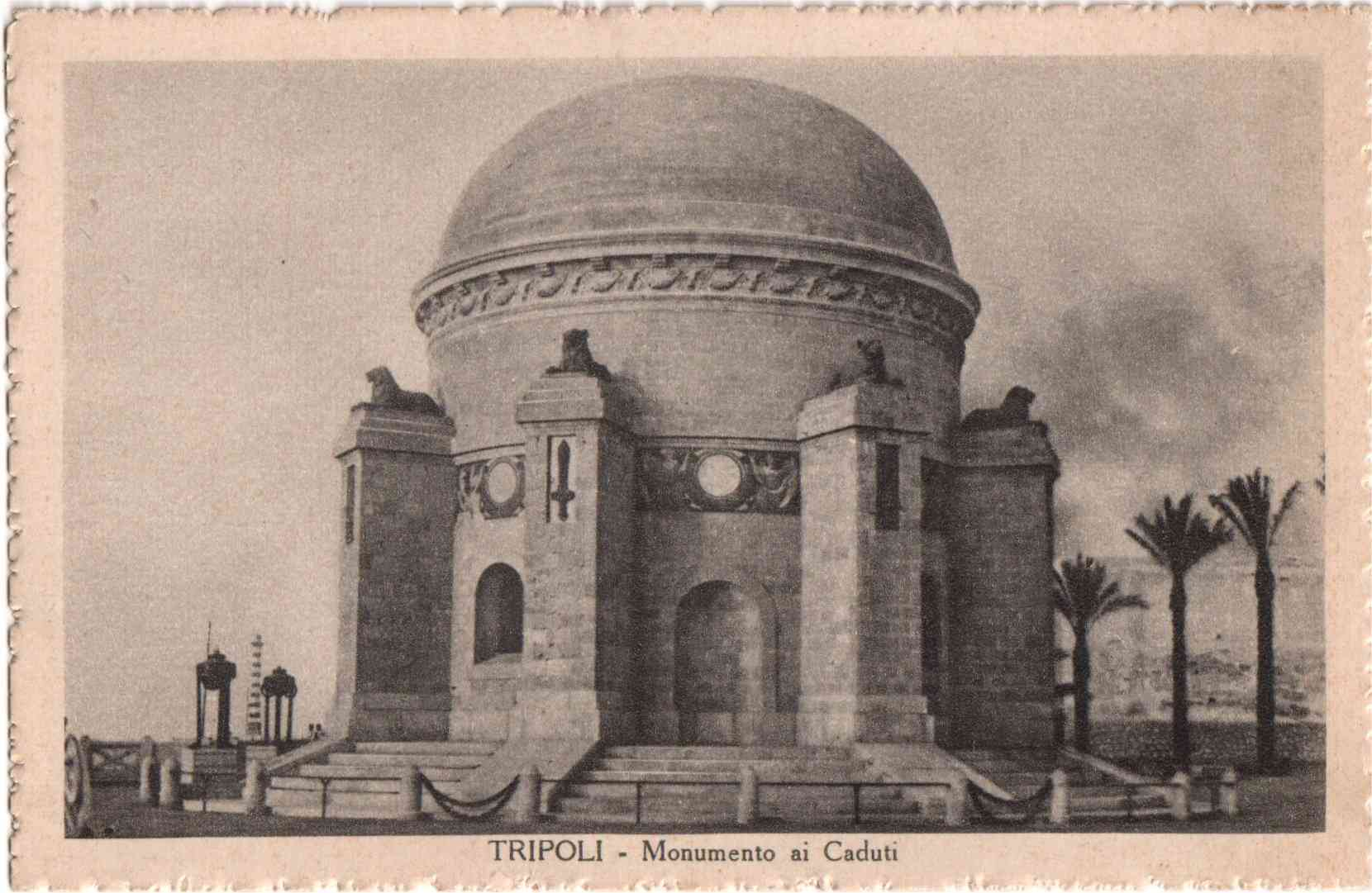
Monument to the Fallen, Tripoli

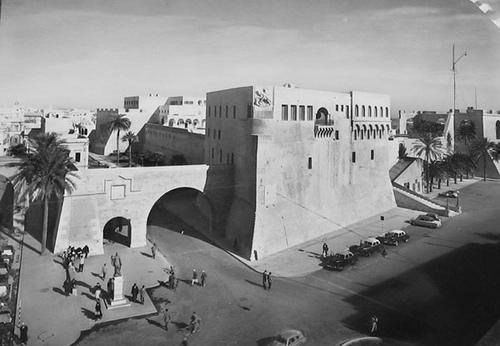
Tripoli Castle following its renovation by Brasini

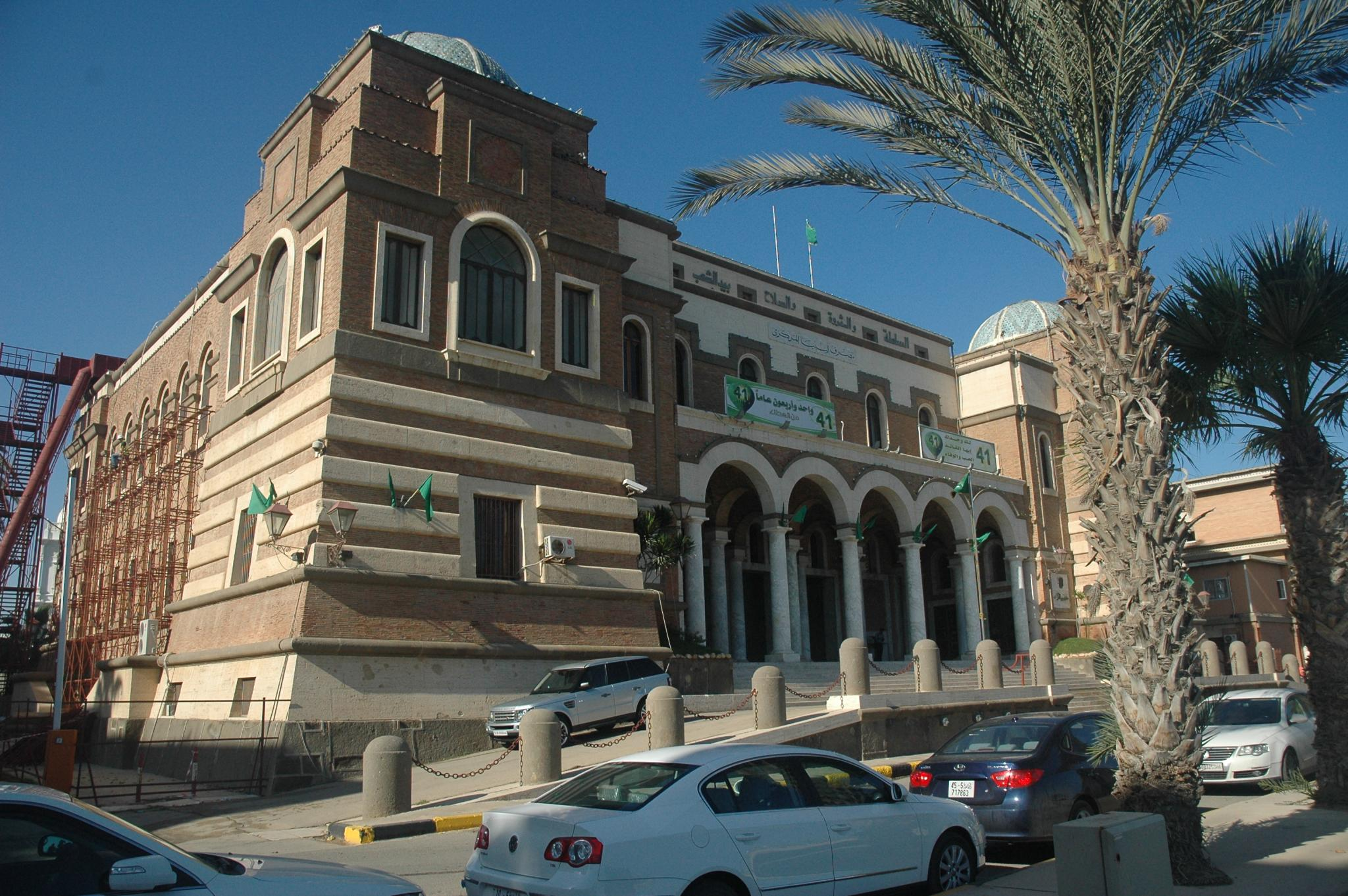
Savings Bank building, Tripoli

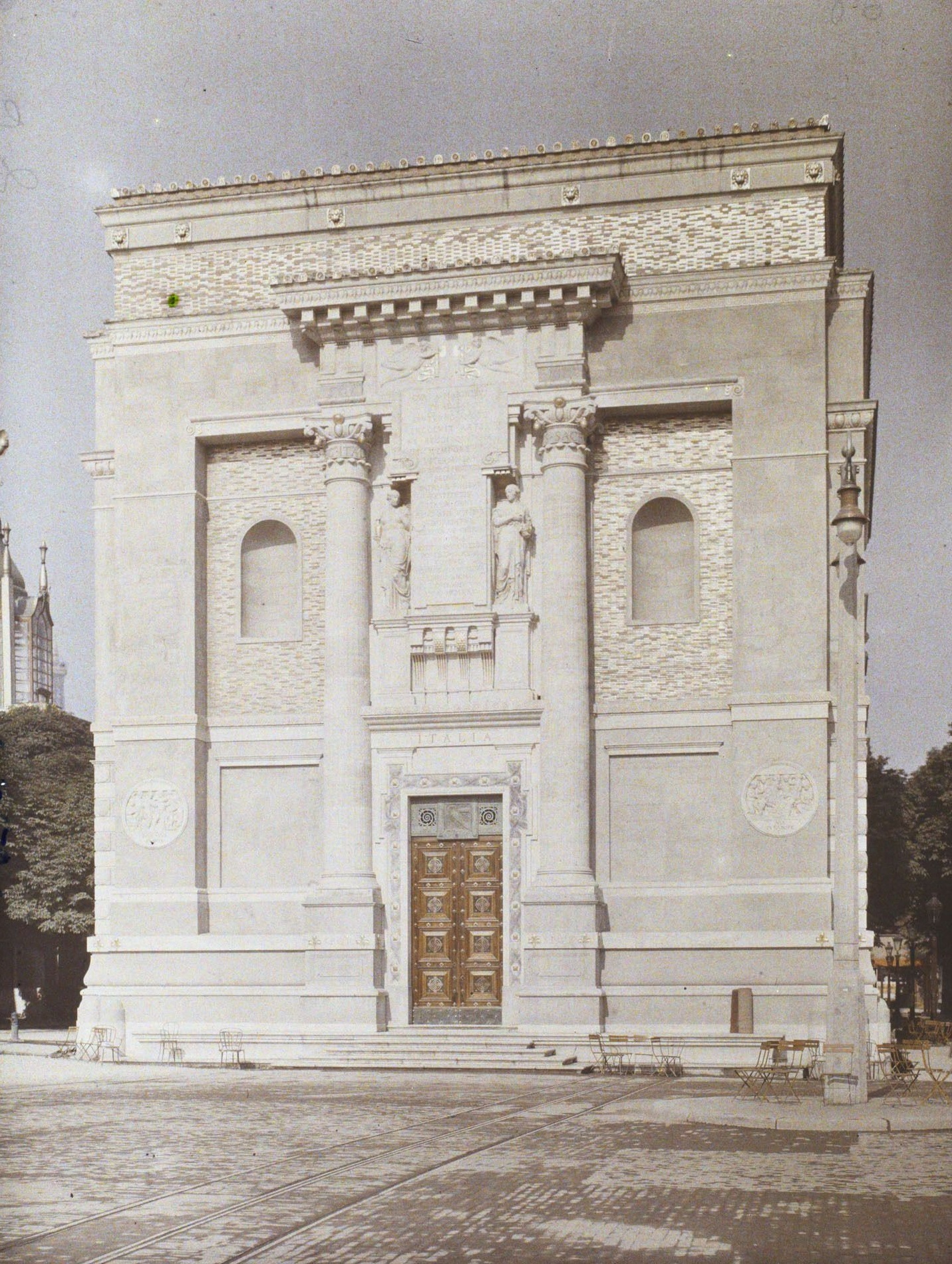
Italian Pavilion at the Paris Arts Décoratifs Exhibition, 1925

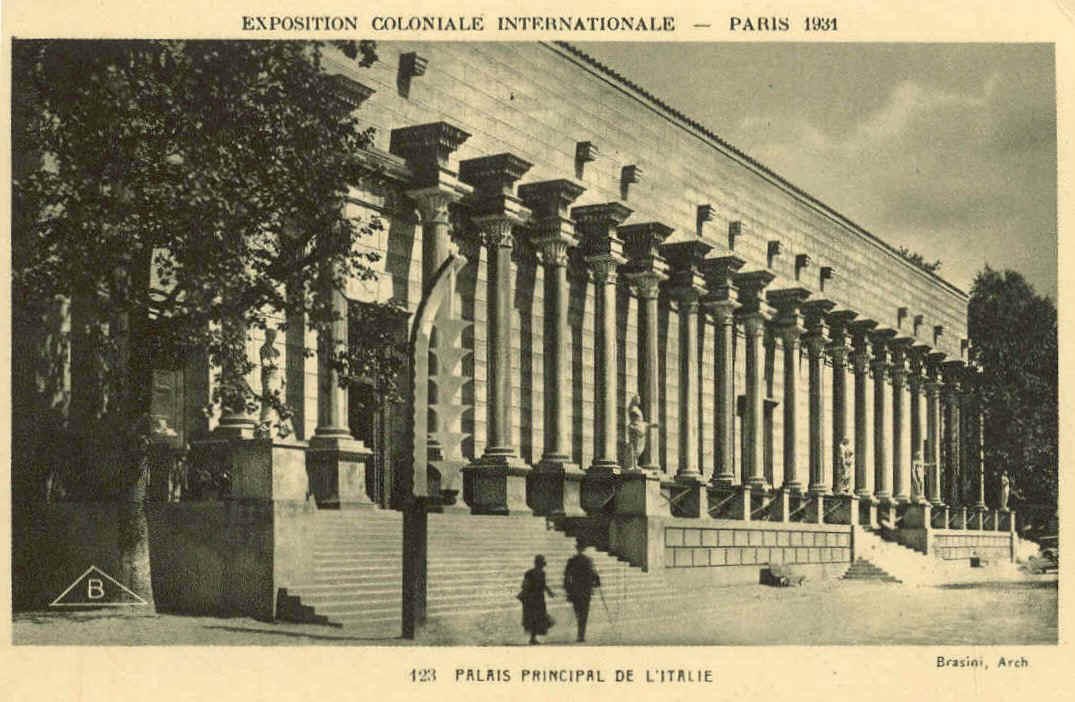
Italian Pavilion at the Paris Colonial Exhibition, 1931

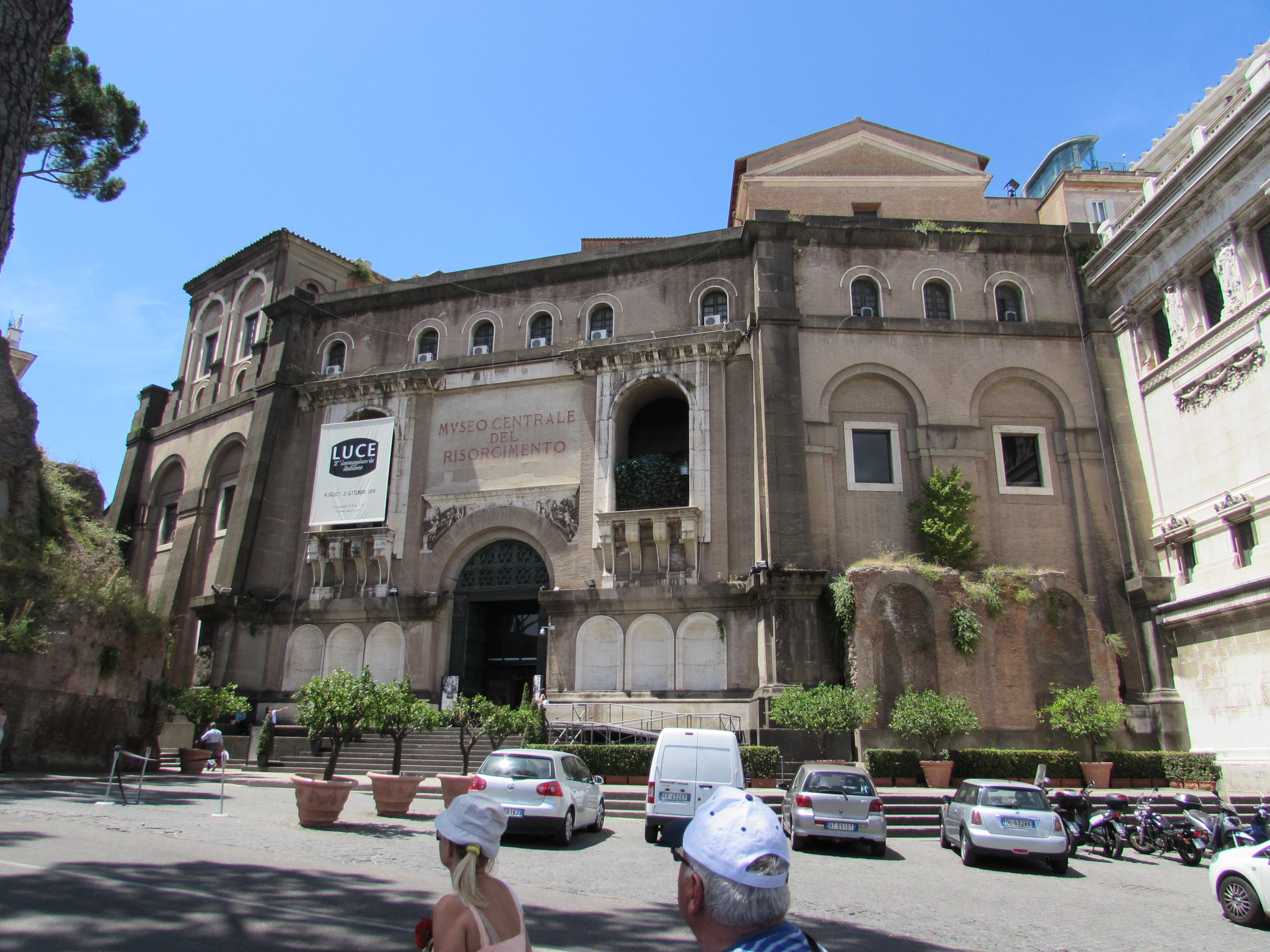
Museo Centrale del Risorgimento, Rome

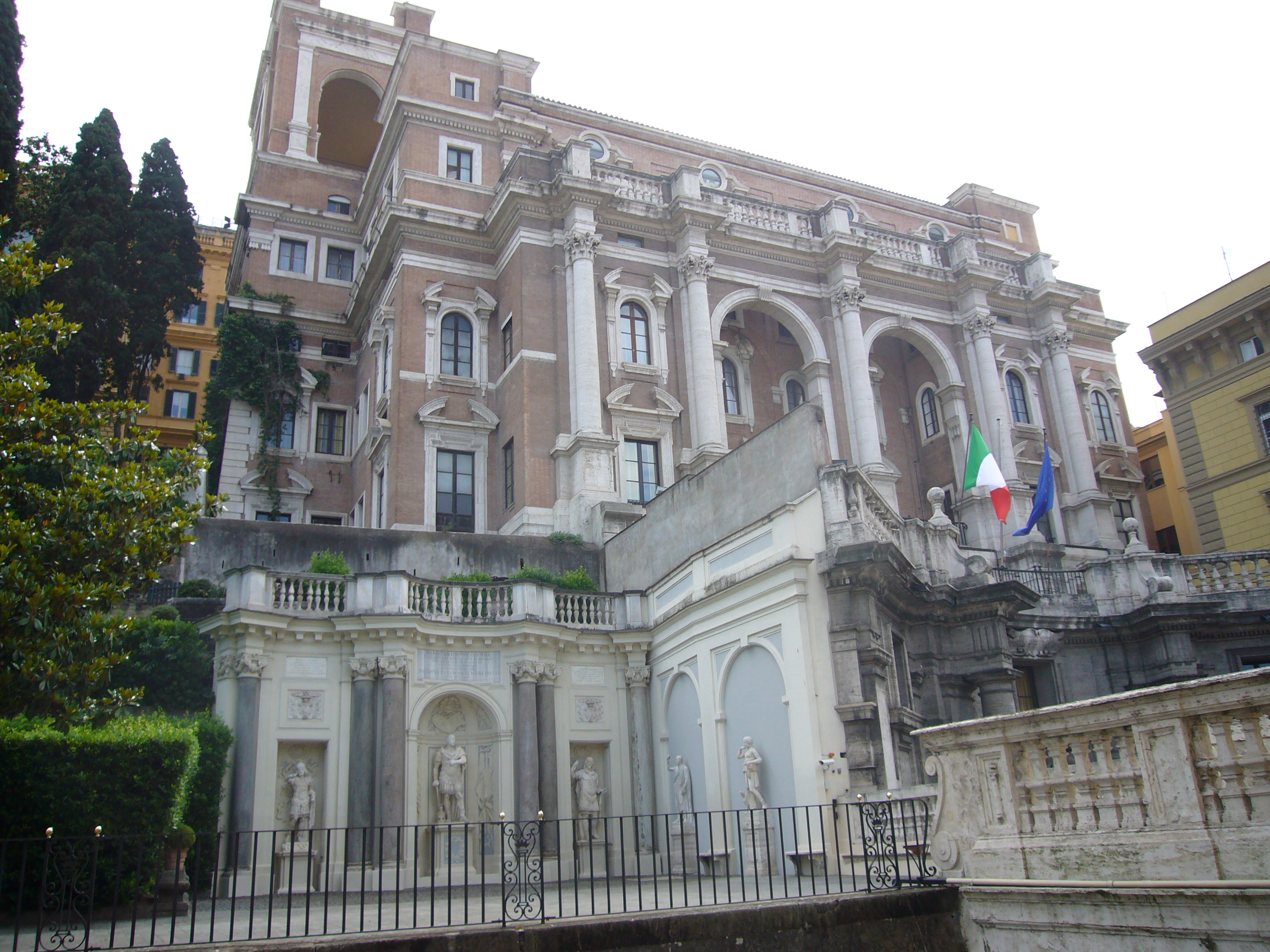
INAIL Building, Rome

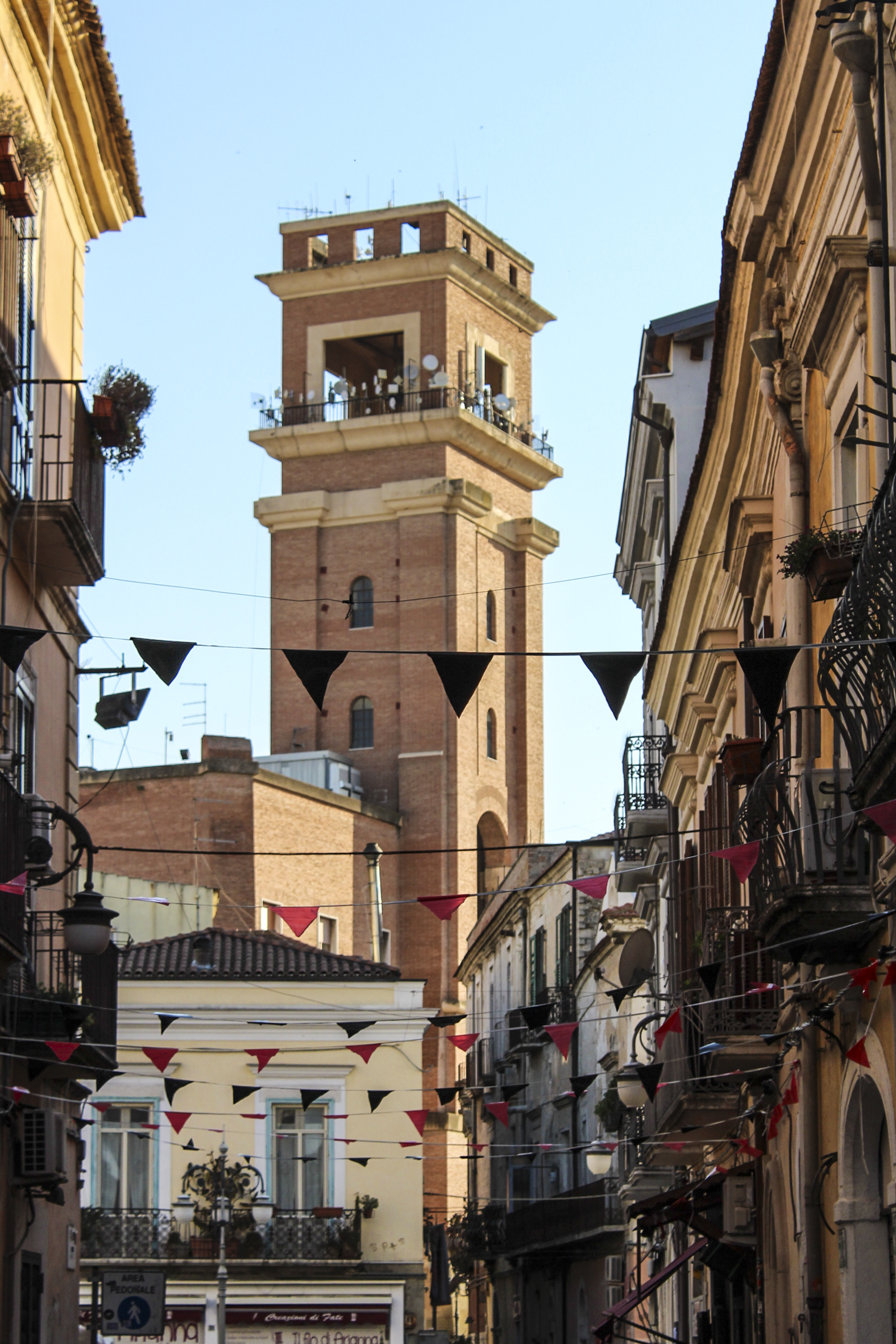
City Hall, Foggia

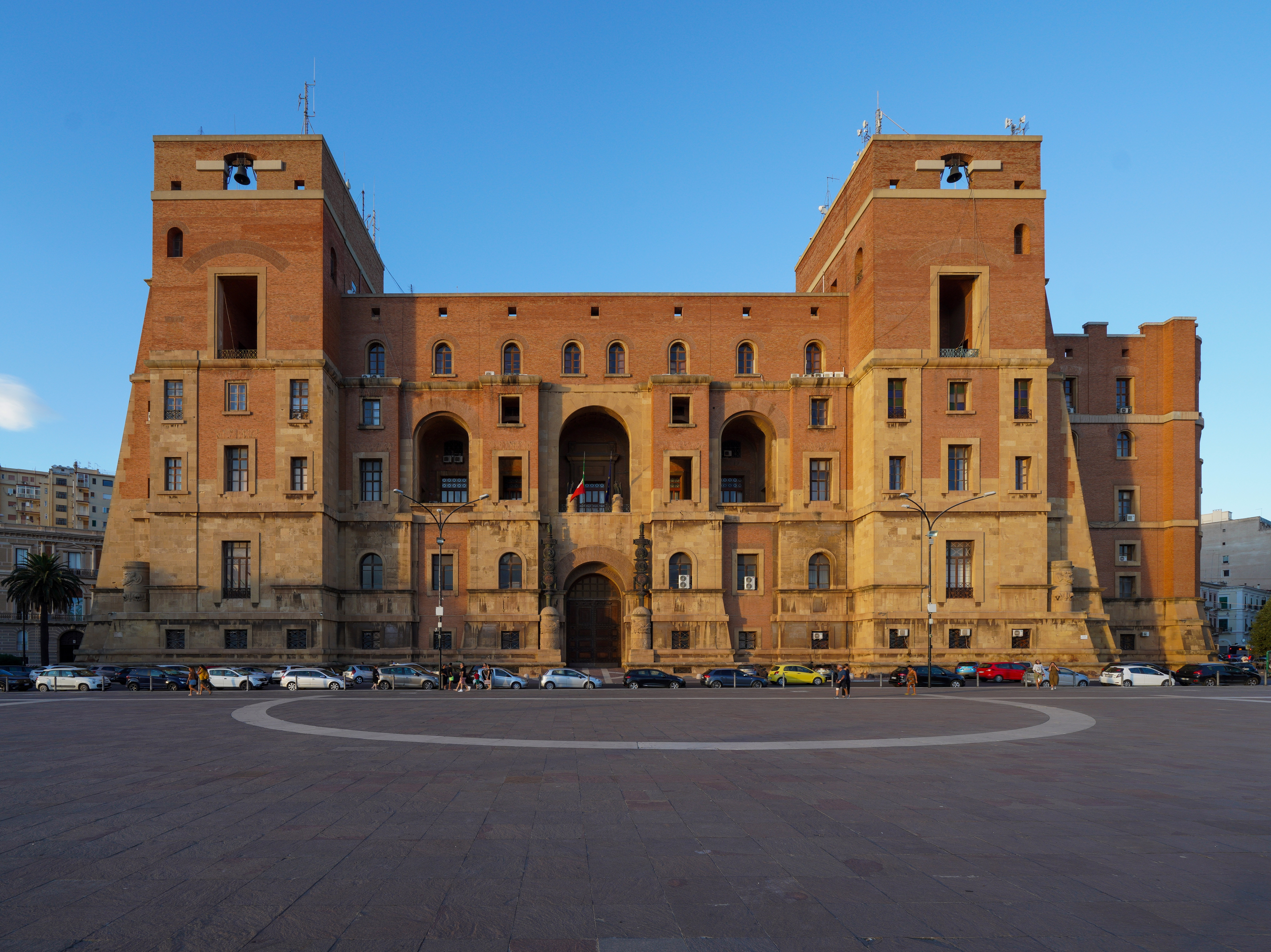
Palazzo del governo, Taranto

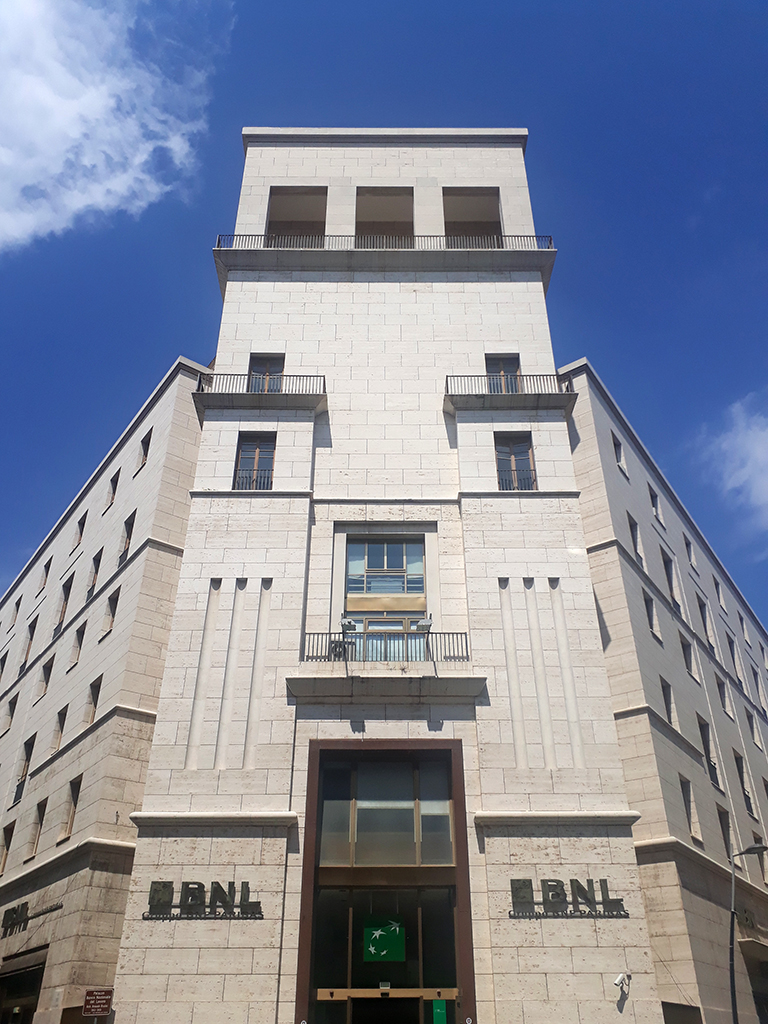
Banca Nazionale del Lavoro, Naples

Basilica of the Sacred Heart of Mary in Parioli, Rome

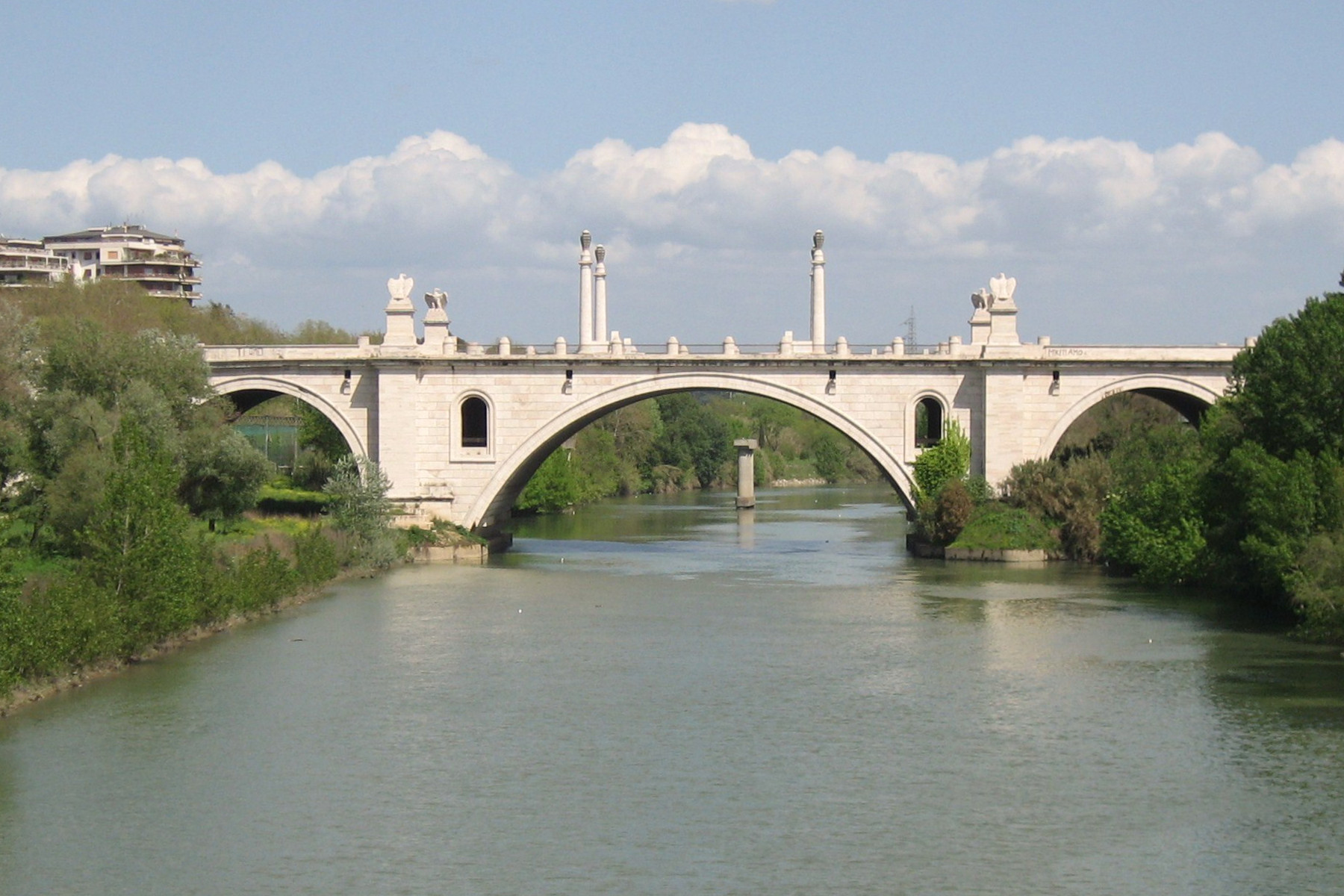
Ponte Flaminio, Rome

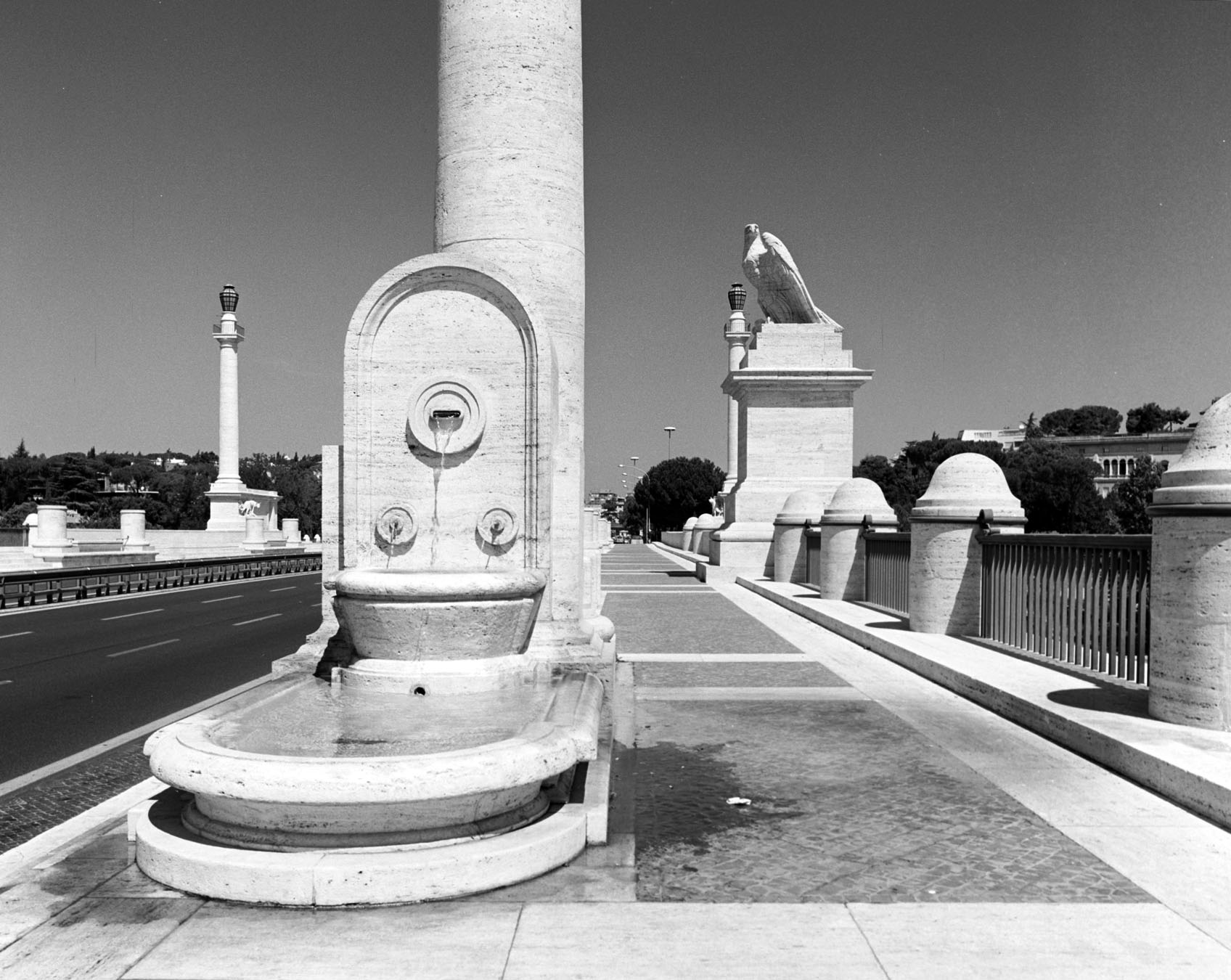
Ponte Flaminio, detail of decoration

== Honors ==
- Member of the Royal Academy of Italy, 1929
- Knight of the Grand Cross of the Order of the Crown of Italy
- Knight of Magistral Grace of the Sovereign Military Order of Malta

== See also ==
- Cesare Bazzani
- Giovanni Muzio
- Florestano Di Fausto
- Paul Bigot
- Ricardo Bofill
