= Ponte Flaminio (Rome) =

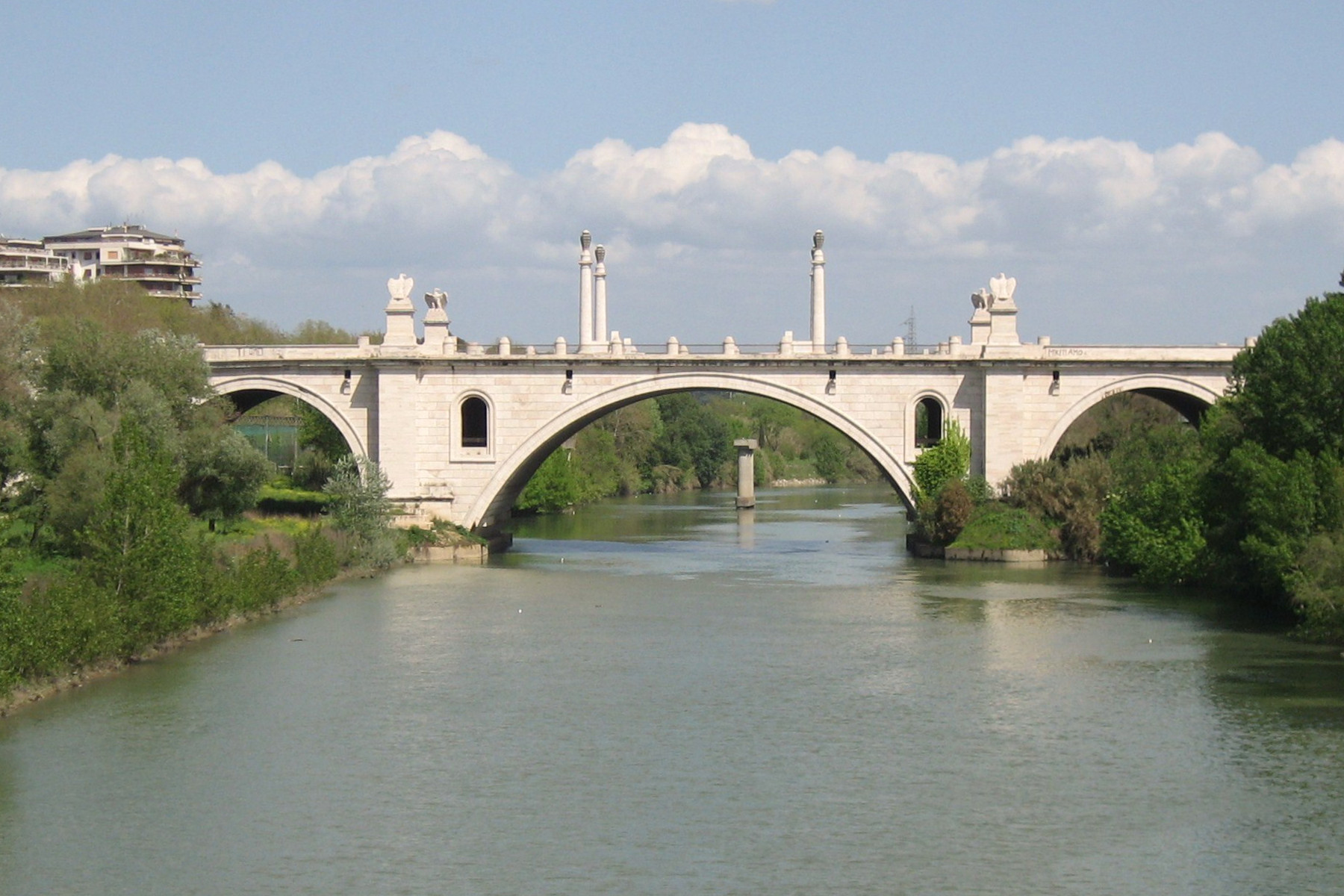
- Coordinates: 41°56′11.0″N 12°28′18.0″E
- Crosses: Tiber
- Locale: Rome, Lazio, Italy

Characteristics
- Material: Concrete and travertine
- Total length: 254.94 metres (836.4 ft)
- Width: 27 metres (89 ft)

History
- Architect: Armando Brasini, Aristide Giannelli
- Construction start: 1938
- Construction end: 1951

Location
- Click on the map for a fullscreen view

Ponte Flaminio is a bridge in Rome (Italy), crossed by Corso di Francia, in the Quartieri Parioli and Tor di Quinto and in the zone of Vigna Clara.

== Construction ==
In the 1930s, the insufficiency of the ancient Milvian Bridge as an exit from Rome along the route of the Cassia and Flaminia consular roads, together with the need to provide a scenographic entrance to the capital for the traffic coming from North, led to the planning of a series of interventions: a variant upstream of the present Via Cassia Vecchia (to be connected to a variant of Via Flaminia Vecchia) and the construction of a new bridge, which should have been called "October XXVIII" in memory of the date of the march on Rome.

The project of the bridge was entrusted to Armando Brasini, who had already begun to build the church in the nearby Piazza Euclide, Villa Manzoni and his own home at the Milvian Bridge. As regards the structures, the task was entrusted to the engineer Aristide Giannelli.
The project that Brasini presented to Mussolini involved a huge monumental arch that emulated the Roman triumphal arches; nonetheless, the Duce, who often made changes to the drawings of his designers, removed the arch and simplified the project. It seems that Brasini willingly accepted the change, stating that the project had been improved in terms of breadth and originality.

The works, entrusted to the company Tecnobeton, began in 1938, therefore on the eve of World War II; for this reason they were stopped in 1943, when some of the structures already built suffered damage due to war events. The works were resumed only in 1947 and completed in 1951.
In the newly established Republic, the bridge should have changed its name into Ponte della Libertà (Italian for "Bridge of Freedom"). However, a name consistent with that of the first stretch of the variant to the Via Cassia – to which it would have been connected, – was finally preferred: this stretch, from the bridge to Via Antonio de Viti de Marco, was formerly called Via Caio Flaminio, then Via Flaminia nuova and finally Corso di Francia since 1959. It is in fact the first monumental bridge over the Tiber north of Rome, serving the historic route of the Via Flaminia; since 1960 it has been connected to the viaduct of Corso di Francia, which connects the Quarters Tor di Quinto and Parioli overpassing the Olympic village.

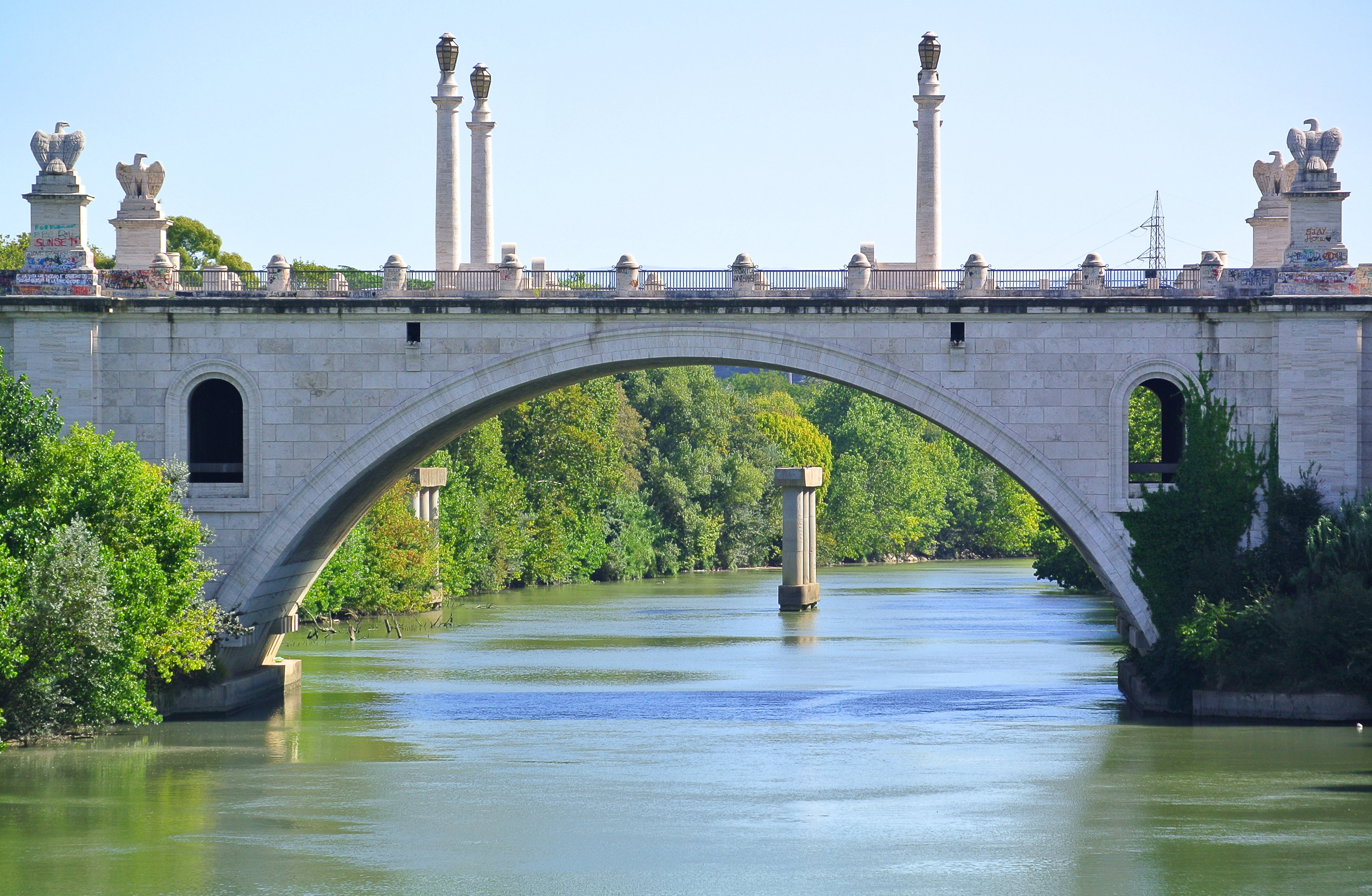
Ponte Flaminio. Below the main arch, one of the pylons of the Bailey bridge, built in the 1960s and now demolished, is visible.

In the early 1960s the bridge was closed to motor vehicles due to a structural problem on the fifth pylon, which caused a subsidence of the roadway; the restoration works were entrusted to the engineers Arrigo Carè and Giorgio Giannelli, while a Bailey bridge was set up just upstream to absorb the traffic.
The bridge was reopened in 1964, when, however, the construction of the Grande Raccordo Anulare and the Fiumicino Airport had substantially reduced its function as the main entrance to Rome.

== Description ==
The bridge, which measures 254.94 metres (836.4 ft) in length by 27 metres (89 ft), is spread over five arches and is made of concrete entirely covered with Roman travertine characterized by warm shades of white. Cylindrical stones and stems, bearing eagles and street lamps, rise on the two large sidewalks, raised by scenic stairways.
Its profile recalls that of the neighbor Milvian Bridge, with enormously emphasized proportions, thus obtaining a monumental and imposing structure.

== Transports ==
Train stop (Piazza Euclide, Rome–Viterbo railway)

== Bibliography ==
- Alberto Tagliaferri; Valerio Varriale, I ponti di Roma. Rome, Newton Compton, 2007.
- Giuliano Malizia, I ponti di Roma. Rome, Newton Compton, 1994.
- Paolo Nicoloso, Mussolini Architetto. Turin, Einaudi, 2008

== Cinema ==
- The bridge appears in the film Poor, But Handsome (1956) by Dino Risi.
- In the chapter In vespa of the film Caro diario (1993) by Nanni Moretti, the director / protagonist passes over the bridge – for which he expresses love – at least twice a day.
- It appears in the film Three Steps Over Heaven (2004), based on the book by the same title by Federico Moccia.
- In the episode Il Cittadino, lo Stato e la Chiesa of the film Made in Italy (1965) by Nanni Loy, a bus of ACLI retirees can't access the bridge, since it is blocked due to its structural problems; the bridge is however called Ponte della Vittoria (a bridge that does not exist in Rome).
