= Richard Alarcón Urrutia =

Peruvian Roman Catholic bishop (1952–2026)

The Most Reverend Richard Alarcón Urrutia
- Archbishop of Cusco
- Church: Catholic Church
- Archdiocese: Cusco
- See: Cusco
- Appointed: 28 October 2014
- Installed: 4 January 2015
- Term ended: 30 October 2026
- Predecessor: Juan Antonio Ugarte Pérez
- Successor: Lizardo Estrada Herrera
- Previous post: Bishop of Tarma (2001–2014)

Orders
- Ordination: 8 December 1976
- Consecration: 21 July 2001 by Luis Abilio Sebastiani Aguirre

Personal details
- Born: 10 April 1952 Lima, Peru
- Died: 30 October 2026 (aged 74) Cusco, Peru
- Education: Faculty of Pontifical and Civil Theology of Lima
- Motto: Noqan hamuni kausanayquichispaq
- Coat of arms: Richard Alarcón Urrutia's coat of arms

Richard Daniel Alarcón Urrutia (10 April 1952 – 30 October 2026) was a Peruvian Roman Catholic prelate who served as Archbishop of Cusco from 2014 until his death in 2026. He was previously Bishop of Tarma from 2001 to 2014.

== Early life and education ==
Alarcón Urrutia was born in Lima, Peru, on 10 April 1952. He attended primary school in Lima and subsequently continued his secondary education as an aspirant to religious life in a school of the Order of Friars Minor. He later studied philosophy and theology at the Faculty of Pontifical and Civil Theology of Lima.

He made his solemn profession in the Order of Friars Minor on 15 May 1976 and was ordained a priest in Lima on 8 December 1976. On 20 April 1993, he was incardinated into the secular clergy of the Diocese of Tarma.

== Priesthood ==
During his priestly ministry, Alarcón Urrutia held a number of pastoral and formation positions. He served as parish priest of San Francisco and economus of the Franciscan convent in Cusco, master of postulants at the Convent of San José Obrero in Arequipa, guardian and master of postulants at the Convent of Santa Bárbara in Juliaca, and vice-master of the formation house at the Convent of San Francisco in Lima. He later served as parish priest of San Cristóbal in Palcamayo in the Diocese of Tarma and as diocesan administrator of Tarma.

Alarcón Urrutia became vicar general of the Diocese of Tarma in 1993 and held that office until 2001.

A biographical profile issued by the Catholic Church in Peru additionally records his service as parish priest of the Cathedral of Santa Ana of Tarma from 1993 to 1996, parish priest of San Miguel Arcángel in Ulcumayo from 1996 to 2001, and head of the diocesan commission for the laity from 1999 to 2001.

== Bishop of Tarma ==
On 13 June 2001, Pope John Paul II appointed Alarcón Urrutia as Bishop of Tarma. At the time of his appointment, he was vicar general of the diocese. He received his episcopal consecration on 21 July 2001 at the Cathedral of Santa Ana in Tarma. The principal consecrator was Archbishop Luis Abilio Sebastiani Aguirre, with Archbishop Rino Passigato and Bishop Luis Armando Bambarén Gastelumendi as principal co-consecrators.

During his episcopate, Alarcón Urrutia also held positions within the Catholic Church in Peru. The Holy See reported in 2014 that he was president of Caritas Peru and a member of the permanent council of the Episcopal Conference of Peru.

== Archbishop of Cusco ==
On 28 October 2014, Pope Francis appointed Alarcón Urrutia as Metropolitan Archbishop of Cusco, transferring him from the Diocese of Tarma. The appointment followed the acceptance of the resignation of Archbishop Juan Antonio Ugarte Pérez.

Alarcón Urrutia took canonical possession of the Archdiocese of Cusco in a solemn ceremony at the Basilica Cathedral of Cusco on 3 January 2015. He was installed as Archbishop of Cusco as 4 January 2015.

Following his appointment, Alarcón Urrutia described his pastoral approach in terms of service to the people and particular concern for the poor.

== Death ==
On 30 October 2026, Alarcón died at the age of 74 while serving as Archbishop of Cusco. He died at a clinic in Cusco, Peru, after his health deteriorated while being treated for cancer.

Catholic Church titles
Preceded by Juan Antonio Ugarte Pérez	Archbishop of Cusco; 2014–2026	Succeeded by Lizardo Estrada Herrera
Preceded by Luis Abilio Sebastiani Aguirre	Bishop of Tarma; 2001–2014	Succeeded by Luis Alberto Barrera Pacheco
