= Diocese of Tarma =

Roman Catholic diocese in Peru

Diocese of Tarma Dioecesis Tarmensis

Catholic
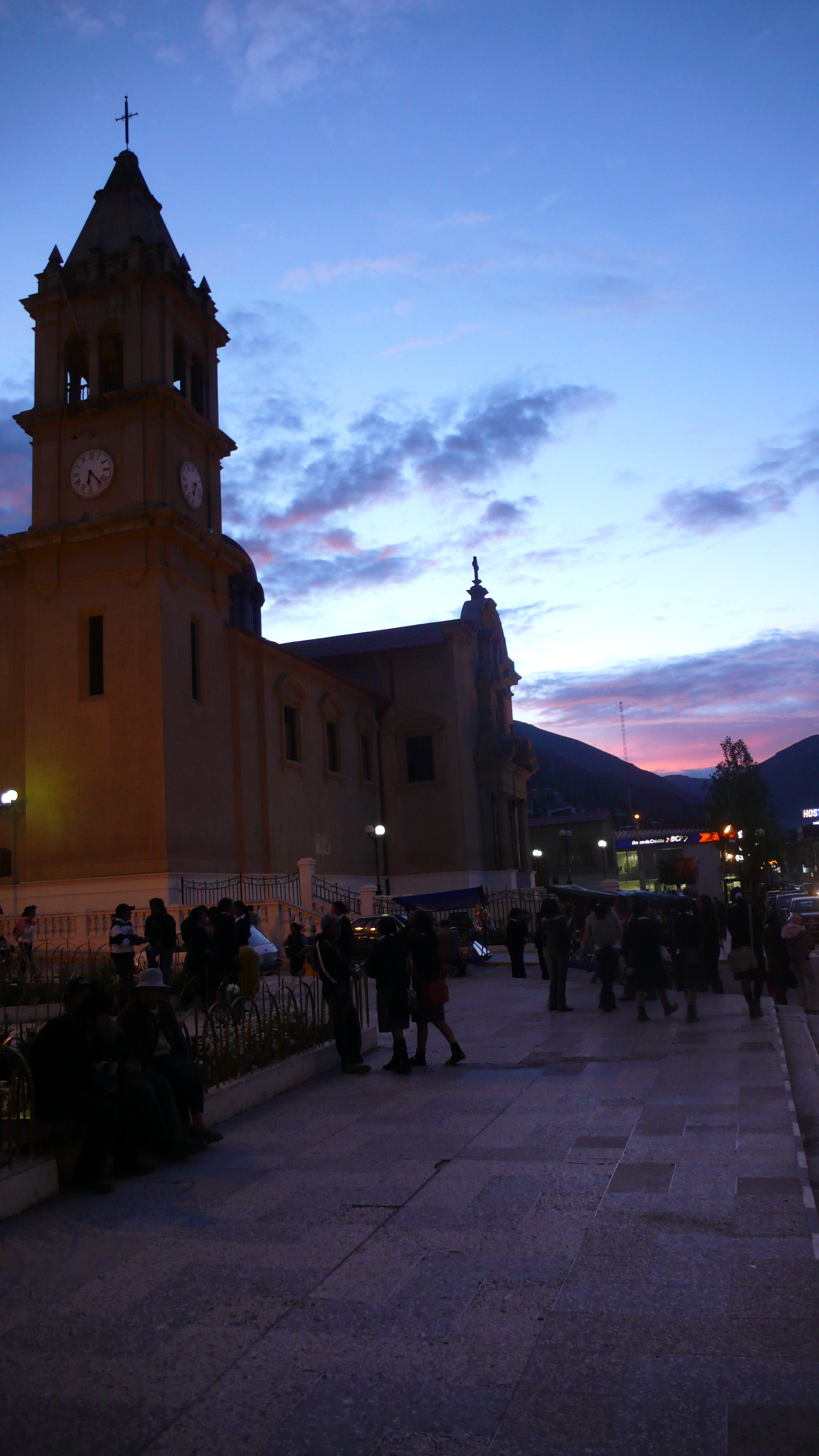
- Cathedral of St. Ann

Location
- Country: Peru
- Ecclesiastical province: Huancayo

Statistics
- Area: 13,032 km^{2} (5,032 sq mi)
- Population: Total; Catholics: (as of 2004); 614,795; 522,575 (85.0%)

Information
- Rite: Latin Rite
- Cathedral: Catedral Santa Ana

Current leadership
- Pope: Leo XIV
- Bishop: Timoteo Solórzano Rojas, M.S.C.

The Roman Catholic Diocese of Tarma (Latin: Tarmensis) is a diocese located in the city of Tarma in the ecclesiastical province of Huancayo in Peru.

== History ==
- 15 May 1958: Established as Territorial Prelature of Tarma from the Diocese of Huancayo and Diocese of Huánuco
- 21 December 1985: Promoted as Diocese of Tarma

== Ordinaries ==
- Prelates of Tarma (Roman rite):
  - Bishop Antonio Kühner y Kühner, M.C.C.I. (1958.05.15 – 1980.07.24), appointed Bishop of Huánuco
  - Bishop Lorenzo Unfried Gimpel, M.C.C.I. (1980.09.19 – 1985.12.21);
- Bishops of Tarma (Roman rite):
  - Bishop Lorenzo Unfried Gimpel, M.C.C.I. (1985.12.21 – 1988.11.29)
  - Bishop Luis Abilio Sebastiani Aguirre, S.M. (1992.11.21 – 2001.06.13), appointed Archbishop of Ayacucho o Huamanga
  - Bishop Richard Daniel Alarcón Urrutia (2001.06.13 – 2014.10.28), appointed Archbishop of Cuzco
  - Bishop Luis Alberto Barrera Pacheco, M.C.C.I. (2016.10.25 – 2021.04.17), appointed Bishop of Callao
  - Bishop Timoteo Solórzano Rojas, M.S.C. (2022.06.18 – ...)

== See also ==
- Roman Catholicism in Peru

== Sources ==
- GCatholic.org
- Catholic Hierarchy
