= Federico Richter Prada =

- Archbishop of the Archdiocese of Ayacucho o Huamanga (emeritus)
- Church: Roman Catholic Church
- See: Archdiocese of Ayacucho o Huamanga
- In office: 1979–1991
- Predecessor: Otoniel Alcedo Culquicóndor
- Successor: Juan Luis Cipriani Thorne
- Previous post(s): Prelate

Orders
- Ordination: July 14, 1946

Personal details
- Born: Federico Richter Fernández-Prada; February 14, 1922; Huanta, Peru
- Died: August 8, 2011 (aged 89)

Federico Richter Fernández-Prada O.F.M. (February 14, 1922 – August 8, 2011) was a Peruvian Prelate of the Roman Catholic Church.

Federico Richter Fernández-Prada was born in Huanta, Peru, ordained a priest on July 14, 1946 from the religious order of the Order of Friars Minor. He was appointed auxiliary bishop of the Archdiocese of Piura as well as titular bishop of Thucca in Numidia. Prada was appointed Coadjutor Archbishop of the Archdiocese of Ayacucho o Huamanga in 1975, succeeding as bishop on November 20, 1979. He would retire on May 23, 1991.

== See also ==
- Archdiocese of Piura
- Archdiocese of Ayacucho o Huamanga
- Order of Friars Minor
