= Corso di Francia (Rome) =

Street in Rome, Italy

- Interactive map of Corso di Francia
- Type: Driveway
- Location: Rome, Italy
- Quarter: Parioli; Tor di Quinto
- Postal code: 00191
- Coordinates: 41°56′11.0″N 12°28′18.0″E
- From: Viale Maresciallo Pilsudski
- Major junctions: Via del Foro Italico
- To: Via Cassia Nuova

Construction
- Construction start: 1930s
- Completion: 1960s

Corso di Francia, informally called Corso Francia, is a street in the northern area of Rome (Italy). It runs in a south–north direction between the Quarters Parioli and Tor di Quinto and, together with the nearby Via del Foro Italico and Viale Guglielmo Marconi, is the only urban road in the town to overpass the Tiber keeping the same name on both banks.

The street, named after France, is divided into two parts. The first one, towards the city center, is formed by the Ponte Flaminio and by a viaduct that crosses the area of the Olympic Village, about 1 kilometre (0.62 miles) long, designed by Pier Luigi Nervi; the beams of the overpass rest on pillars ranging from a minimum of 3.50 metres (11.5 ft) to a maximum of 8 metres (26 ft) meters in height. The second part passes under the overpass of Via del Foro Italico and continues until the junction between Via Cassia Nuova and Via Flaminia Nuova.

== Transports ==
Train stops (Piazza Euclide and Acqua Acetosa, Rome–Viterbo railway).

== Bibliography ==
- Claudio Rendina; Donatella Paradisi (2004). Le strade di Roma. Vol. 2, E–O. Rome: Newton Compton Editori.
