= Lizardo Estrada Herrera =

Peruvian Roman Catholic archbishop (born 1973)

His Excellency, The Most Reverend Lizardo Estrada Herrera OSA
- Archbishop of Cusco
- Church: Catholic Church
- Archdiocese: Roman Catholic Archdiocese of Cusco
- Appointed: 29 August 2026
- Installed: 30 October 2026
- Predecessor: Richard Alarcón Urrutia
- Other posts: Secretary General of the Latin American and Caribbean Episcopal Council (CELAM); Member, Dicastery for Promoting Integral Human Development; Member, Dicastery for Communication
- Previous posts: Auxiliary Bishop of Cusco (Jan 2021‍–‍Aug 2026); Titular Bishop of Ausuccura (Jan 2021‍–‍Aug 2026); Coadjutor Archbishop of Cusco (Aug 2026‍–‍Oct 2026)

Orders
- Ordination: 7 August 2005
- Consecration: 22 February 2021 by Richard Alarcón Urrutia

Personal details
- Born: 23 September 1973 (age 53) Cotabambas, Apurímac Region, Peru
- Education: Pontifical Alphonsian Academy
- Motto: Servite in gratiam Christi
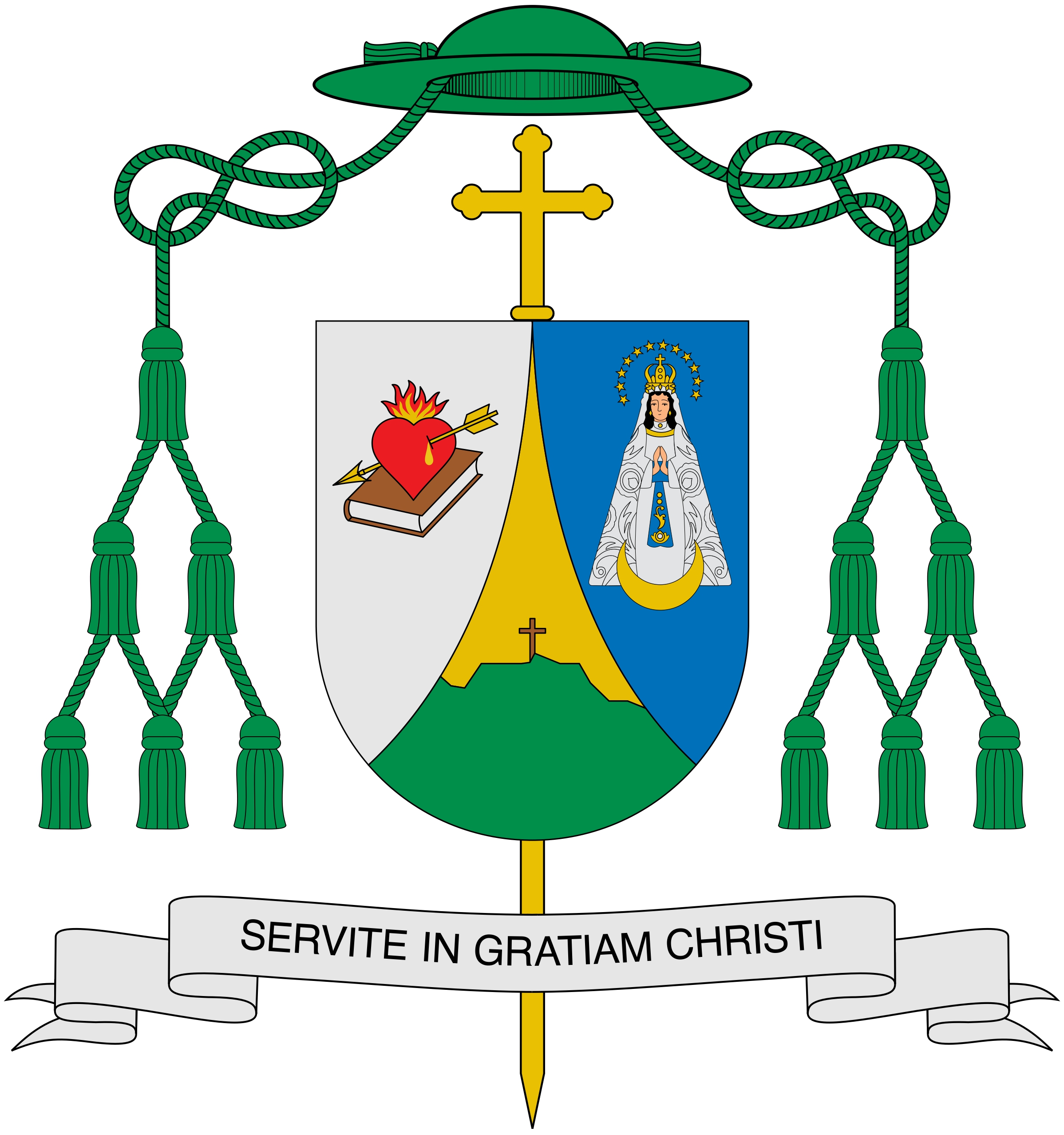
- Coat of arms: Lizardo Estrada Herrera's coat of arms

Lizardo Estrada Herrera O.S.A. (born 23 September 1973) is a Peruvian Roman Catholic prelate who has served as Archbishop of Cusco, Peru since 30 October 2026.

He concurrently serves as Secretary General of the Latin American and Caribbean Episcopal Council (CELAM) since 2023.

He served as auxiliary bishop of Cusco from January 2021 until 29 August 2026, when he was appointed as a Coadjutor Archbishop of the same Archdiocese.

In 2026, Pope Leo XIV appointed him a member of the Dicastery for Promoting Integral Human Development and the Dicastery for Communication.

== Early life and education ==
Of Quechua origin, Lizardo was born on 23 September 1973 in the Cotabambas province, in the Apurímac Region of Peru. He attended Colegio San Martín from 1980 to 1985 and Colegio San Agustín de Cotabambas from 1986 to 1990. He studied philosophy at the Nuestra Señora de Cocharcas Seminary in Abancay from 1991 to 1993 and theology at the San Carlos y San Marcelo Seminary of the Archdiocese of Trujillo from 1997 to 2000.

He took his first vows in the Order of Saint Augustine on 16 May 1998 and his solemn profession on 27 May 2001. He was ordained a priest on 7 August 2005 at the Cathedral of Señor de la Exaltación in Chuquibambilla, Apurímac.

Estrada Herrera obtained a licentiate in moral theology from the Pontifical Alphonsian Academy in Rome, studying there from 2001 to 2003. He studied pedagogy at the Instituto Juan Pablo II in Trujillo from 2006 to 2007 and obtained a licentiate in education from the Catholic University of Trujillo in 2009. He also obtained doctorates in education in Peru and pastoral theology from the Pontifical Bolivarian University in Medellín, Colombia. In 2020, Estrada Herrera attended a course in the social doctrine of the Church and social pastoral ministry at Latin American and Caribbean Episcopal Council (CELAM)'s Centro Bíblico Teológico Pastoral para América Latina y el Caribe.

== Priesthood ==
Following his ordination, Estrada Herrera held a number of pastoral, educational and administrative positions in Peru. From 2004 to 2005 he was a professor at the Instituto Superior Pedagógico de Tambobamba in Apurímac. From 2005 to 2006 he served as parish vicar of Señor de la Exaltación in Chuquibambilla, bursar of an Augustinian community, and a religion teacher at Colegio Túpac Amaru in Cusco. From 2006 to 2009 he was a professor of moral theology at the Saint Anthony the Abbot Seminary.

Estrada Herrera also served as professor of philosophical ethics and formator of novices at the Augustinian Seminary Fray Diego Ortiz, parish vicar of Santa Rita de Casia, and executive director of the Santa Rita Hospital in Cusco. From 2013 to 2016 he served as regional vicar and major superior of the Augustinian Fathers of the San Agustín de Apurímac Vicariate. From 2013 to 2017 he was prior of the Augustinian Convent Fray Diego Ortiz and promoter and general director of Colegio San Agustín de Hipona in Cusco.

From 2015 to 2018, Estrada Herrera was a member of the Presbyteral Council and College of Consultors and served as episcopal vicar for consecrated life of the Archdiocese of Cusco. He was parish priest of Santa Rita de Casia in Cusco from 2017 to 2018. He subsequently served as episcopal vicar for consecrated life of the Archdiocese of Trujillo and president of the Federation of Augustinians of the Vicariates of Peru.

== Episcopacy ==
On 9 January 2021, Pope Francis appointed Estrada Herrera titular bishop of Ausuccura and auxiliary bishop of the Archdiocese of Cusco. He received his episcopal consecration on 22 February 2021. The principal consecrator was Archbishop Richard Daniel Alarcón Urrutia, Archbishop of Cusco.

In January 2022, during the 122nd Plenary Assembly of the Peruvian Bishops' Conference, Estrada Herrera was elected president of its Episcopal Commission for Consecrated Life and Societies of Apostolic Life. He was also appointed a member of CELAM's Council for Economic Affairs.

In January 2023, he was elected Secretary General of the Peruvian Bishops' Conference. He held the position until August 2023, when he was succeeded upon his election to CELAM by Father Guillermo Inca Pereda.

On August 29, 2026, Pope Leo XIV appointed him a coadjutor archbishop of the Archdiocese of Cuzco, Peru, transferring him from the titular see of Ausuccura and the office of auxiliary bishop of the same archdiocese."

Following the death of Archbishop Richard Daniel Alarcón Urrutia on 30 October 2026, he automatically succeeded him as Archbishop of Cusco, in accordance with canon 409 §1 of the Code of Canon Law. He formally assumed pastoral governance of the archdiocese on 2 November 2026.

On November 15, 2026, Estrada received and accompanied Pope Leo XIV during his Apostolic Journey to Cusco. He conclued his welcome remarks at Sacsayhuamán with the Quechua expression "Kunanqa, sonqoykuta kicharispa, uyarikusaykiku," which translates to “Now, we will listen to you with our hearts open.”

== Secretary General of CELAM ==
In May 2023, during the 39th General Ordinary Assembly of CELAM in Aguadilla, Puerto Rico, Estrada Herrera was elected Secretary General of CELAM for the 2023–2027 term.

In a May 2023 interview with Vida Nueva, Estrada Herrera described his new position as a service to a Church seeking to renew its commitment to the peripheries and to advance Synodality.

Estrada Herrera has participated in CELAM initiatives concerning synodality, communications, social doctrine, migration, poverty and the environment. In June 2023, he spoke at a CELAM event on the Catholic Church's presence in digital culture and the role of communication in evangelization.

== Relationship with Pope Leo XIV ==
Estrada Herrera had known Pope Leo XIV when Leo XIV was Robert Francis Prevost, an Augustinian priest and later bishop in Peru. Prevost was head of formation when Estrada began theological studies in Trujillo in 1996-1997. In a November 2026 interview with America Magazine, Estrada said of Prevost, "He was a brother, a friend and a guide."

In May 2025, shortly after Prevost's election as pope, Estrada spoke publicly about his former teacher and spiritual director and about their years of service in the Peruvian Church. On 15 May 2025, Pope Leo XIV received Estrada Herrera and CELAM president Cardinal Jaime Spengler in an official audience at the Apostolic Palace. They discussed the forthcoming CELAM General Assembly, preparations for the COP30 climate conference, the implementation of the Synod's final document, and other matters concerning the Church in Latin America and the Caribbean.

In May 2025, Estrada Herrera also spoke to the Italian news agency ANSA to describe Leo as having a strong connection to both Latin America and Peru and recalled their earlier relationship as teacher and student and later as fellow bishops. The relationship was also noted in English-language Catholic press coverage. Reporting on a September 15, 2025 audience with Pope Leo XIV, OSV News identified Estrada Herrera as the Secretary General of CELAM and one of the Latin American bishops participating in the papal meeting.

On 24 January 2026, Pope Leo XIV again received Estrada Herrera in an official audience, identifying him as titular bishop of Ausuccura, auxiliary bishop of Cusco and Secretary General of CELAM.

When opening the Angelus during his Apostolic Journey to Cusco on November 15, 2026, Pope Leo XIV stated, "I am delighted to welcome the new Archbishop of Cusco, effective from October 30 this year, Monsignor Lizardo Estrada."

== Roman Curia appointments ==
On 30 March 2026, Pope Leo XIV appointed Estrada Herrera a member of the Dicastery for Promoting Integral Human Development.

On 9 April 2026, Pope Leo XIV appointed him a member of the Dicastery for Communication. The Vatican identified him as auxiliary bishop and vicar general of Cusco and Secretary General of CELAM.

Following the appointments, Estrada described communication in the Church as part of its evangelizing mission and emphasized the relationship between communication, listening and synodality.

== Episcopal motto ==
Estrada Herrera's episcopal motto is Servite in gratiam Christi, translated by the Peruvian Bishops' Conference as "Serve with the grace of Christ".
