= Francisco Verdugo Cabrera =

Spanish Catholic prelate

Most Reverend Francisco Verdugo Cabrera
- Bishop of Ayacucho o Huamanga
- Church: Catholic Church
- Diocese: Diocese of Ayacucho o Huamanga
- In office: 1622–1636
- Predecessor: Agustín de Carvajal
- Successor: Gabriel de Zarate

Orders
- Consecration: 27 December 1622 by Luis Jerónimo Oré

Personal details
- Born: 25 July 1561 Carmona, Spain
- Died: 20 July 1636 (aged 74) México City

Francisco Verdugo Cabrera (25 July 1561 – 20 July 1636) was a Spanish Catholic prelate who served as Bishop of Ayacucho o Huamanga (1622–1636). As word of his death had not yet reached Europe, he was appointed Archbishop of Mexico posthumously.

== Biography ==
Francisco Verdugo Cabrera was born in Carmona, Spain on 25 July 1561. On 14 March 1622, he was appointed during the papacy of Pope Gregory XV as Bishop of Ayacucho o Huamanga. On 27 December 1622, he was consecrated bishop by Luis Jerónimo Oré, Bishop of Concepción. On 20 July 1636, he died as Bishop of Ayacucho o Huamanga. As news of his death had not reached Europe, he was appointed on 9 September 1636 during the papacy of Pope Urban VIII as Archbishop of Mexico.

== See also ==
- Catholic Church in Peru

== External links and additional sources ==
- Cheney, David M. "Archdiocese of Ayacucho". Catholic-Hierarchy.org. (for Chronology of Bishops)^{self-published}
- Chow, Gabriel. "Metropolitan Archdiocese of Ayacucho". GCatholic.org. (for Chronology of Bishops)^{self-published}
- Cheney, David M. "Archdiocese of México". Catholic-Hierarchy.org. (for Chronology of Bishops)^{self-published}
- Chow, Gabriel. "Metropolitan Archdiocese of México". GCatholic.org. (for Chronology of Bishops)^{self-published}

Catholic Church titles
Preceded by Agustín de Carvajal	Bishop of Ayacucho o Huamanga; 1622–1636	Succeeded by Gabriel de Zarate
Preceded by Francisco de Manso Zuñiga y Sola	Archbishop of Mexico; Died before Appointment	Succeeded by Feliciano de la Vega Padilla
