= Agustín de Carvajal =

Catholic bishop

Most Reverend Agustín de Carvajal
- Bishop of Ayacucho o Huamanga
- Church: Catholic Church
- Diocese: Diocese of Ayacucho o Huamanga
- In office: 1612–1618
- Predecessor: None
- Successor: Francisco Verdugo Cabrera

Orders
- Consecration: 1608

Personal details
- Born: August 28, 1558 Guadalajara, Mexico
- Died: August 19, 1618 (aged 59) Cartagena, Colombia

Agustín de Carvajal, O.S.A. (August 28, 1558 – August 19, 1618) was a Roman Catholic prelate who served as the first Bishop of Ayacucho o Huamanga (1612–1618) and Bishop of Panamá (1605–1612).

== Biography ==
Agustín de Carvajal was born in Guadalajara, Mexico and ordained a priest in the Order of Saint Augustine. On July 18, 1605, Pope Paul V, appointed him Bishop of Panamá. In 1608, he was consecrated bishop. On May 7, 1612, Pope Clement VIII, appointed him the first Bishop of Ayacucho o Huamanga where he served until his death on August 19, 1618.

While bishop, he was the primary consecrator of Lorenzo Pérez de Grado as Bishop of Paraguay.

== External links and additional sources ==
- Cheney, David M. "Archdiocese of Panamá". Catholic-Hierarchy.org. (for Chronology of Bishops) ^{[self-published]}
- Chow, Gabriel. "Metropolitan Archdiocese of Panamá". GCatholic.org. (for Chronology of Bishops) ^{[self-published]}
- Cheney, David M. "Archdiocese of Ayacucho". Catholic-Hierarchy.org. (for Chronology of Bishops) ^{[self-published]}
- Chow, Gabriel. "Metropolitan Archdiocese of Ayacucho". GCatholic.org. (for Chronology of Bishops) ^{[self-published]}

Religious titles
Preceded by Antonio Calderón de León	Bishop of Panamá; 1605–1612	Succeeded by Francisco de la Cámara y Raya
Preceded by None	Bishop of Ayacucho o Huamanga; 1612–1618	Succeeded by Francisco Verdugo Cabrera
