= Pizzocco =

Mountain in Italy

Coordinates: 46°06′56″N 12°02′01″E

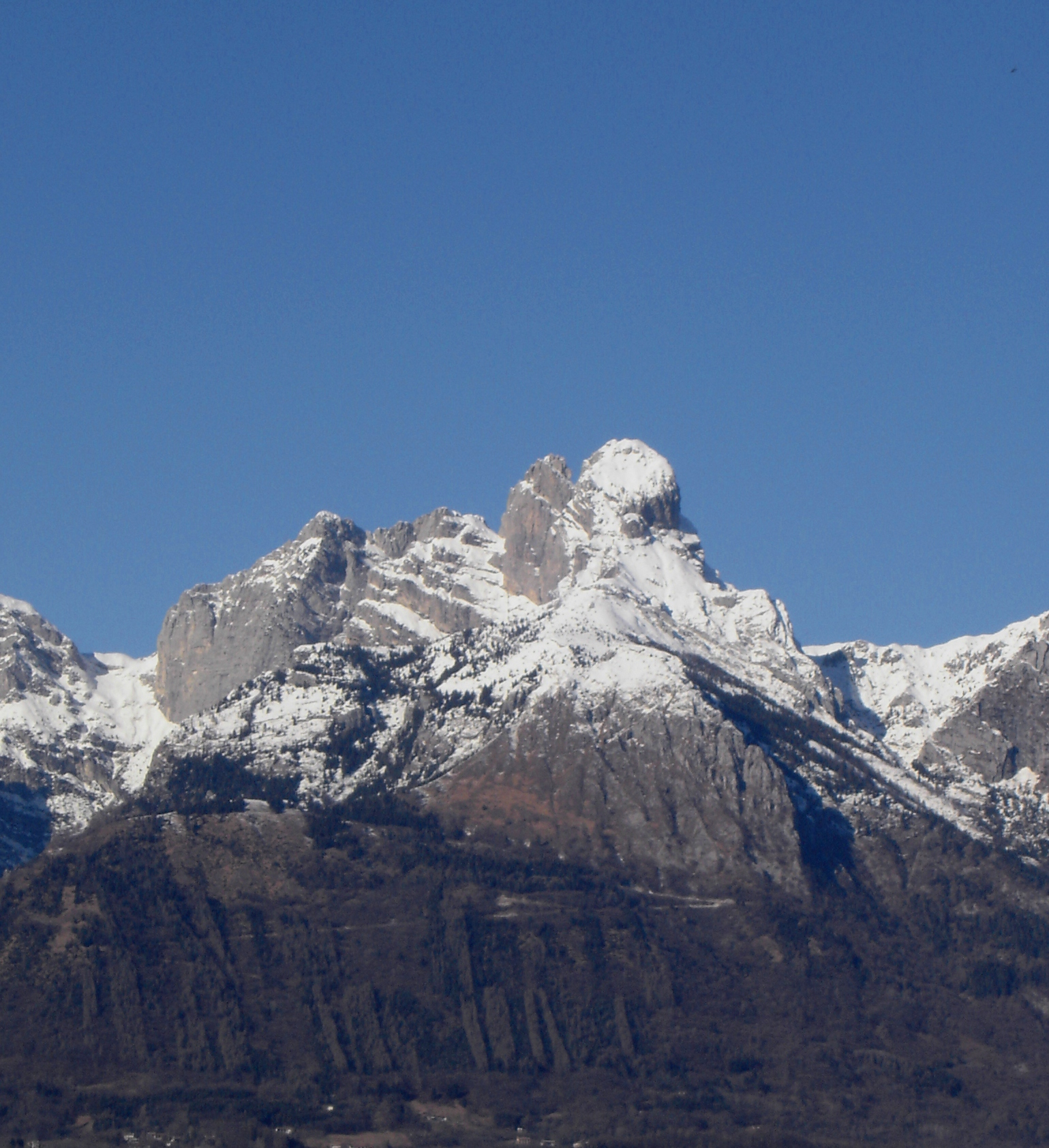

Highest point
- Elevation: 2,187 m (7,175 ft)

Geography
- Location: Veneto, Italy

Pizzocco is a mountain of the Veneto, Italy. It has an elevation of about 2,187 metres. Monte Pizzoci is popular for destination for mountain hiking.
