= Sacro Cuore di Maria =

Basilica Minore del Sacro Cuore di Maria
- Minor Basilica of the Immaculate Heart of Mary (in English); Sacri Cordis Beatæ Mariæ Virginis ad forum Euclidis (in Latin)
- Façade
- Click on the map for a fullscreen view
- 41°55′37″N 12°28′52″Eformat
- Location: Piazza Euclide 34, Rome
- Country: Italy
- Denomination: Roman Catholic
- Tradition: Roman Rite

History
- Status: Titular church, minor basilica
- Dedication: Immaculate Heart of Mary
- Consecrated: 1936

Architecture
- Architect: Armando Brasini
- Architectural type: Church
- Style: Neoclassical
- Groundbreaking: 1923
- Completed: 1952

Specifications
- Length: 81
- Width: 57

Administration
- District: Lazio
- Province: Rome

Minor Basilica of the Immaculate Heart of Mary (Immaculate Heart of Mary), is a titular church in Piazza Euclide, Rome. It was built by the architect Armando Brasini (1879–1965). Its construction began in 1923 with the design of a Greek cross inscribed in a circle with an articulated facade, and completed before 1936, the year in which it was made a parish church and granted to the Congregation of Missionary Sons of the Sacred Immaculate Heart of Mary, usually known as the Claretian Missionaries. A grand dome was planned, but never realized; a smaller drum was completed in 1951.

Pope John XXIII elevated it to the rank of Minor Basilica in May 1959, and Pope Paul VI made it a titular church in February 1965, with Ángel Herrera Oria as the first titular. The present titular priest is Julius Riyadi Darmaatmadja S.J., appointed in 1994.

== Brief history ==
The construction of this church was entrusted by the Claretian Missionaries to the architect Armando Brasini after the transfer of land from the Holy See towards this purpose was accepted by their General Chapter in 1922. The foundation stone was laid in the month of July 1924. On October 21, 1934, the crypt was open for worship and the thanksgiving liturgy for the beatification of Saint Anthony Mary Claret was celebrated. On May 9, 1936, the new parish dedicated to the Immaculate Heart of Mary was inaugurated. The official opening of the church was done in the presence of the Cardinal Clemente Micara on December 7, 1952. In 1953 the Cardinal Clemente Micara celebrated in this church the Consecration of Rome to the Immaculate Heart of Mary. In March 1959 the church was consecrated as a Minor Basilica. Finally, during the advent season of the year 1965 the Basilica was declared "Titolo Cardinalizio". It was, and remains, the largest church, after the four great basilicas of Rome. Whoever looks at the plan of the church will be able to observe that the naves in the form of crosses are circumscribed by a hoop that forms like an aureole. It lacks the large dome foreseen in the project.

== The outer portion ==
The church is set on a base surrounded by stairs and begins its ascent with a majestic Doric order, whose columns have a diameter of 1.50 m. which reach a height of nearly 12 m. On the main pediment it opens to a pronao surmounted by a double gable of austere form; the rhythm of this architectural order is broken only by a coat of arms of the Congregation of the Claretian Missionaries and a dedicatee as used to be found on the triumphal arches which reads in Latin: TO GOD AND IN HONOR OF THE IMMACULATE HEART OF THE BLESSED VIRGIN MARY, QUEEN OF THE PEACE, 1952. A large portico, where the three monumental doors are located gives access to the church, and on top one finds the coat of arms of the present Pope and that of the Congregation of the Claretian Missionaries. On the central door is found the motto: AVE COR MARIAE ESTO SALUS MUNDI (Hail Heart of Mary, be the salvation of the world). To the right, upwards, is an inscription regarding the inauguration of the church.

== The inside of the Basilica ==
Interior of the basilica

The basilica has a length of 94 m., is wide by 58 m. and is connected by a circular passage where four large chapels diagonally open themselves. The decoration of two of them (the Holy Sacrament and the Perpetual Suffrage) were completed by Brasini in the period between 1958 and 1963. The paintings on the nave are the works of Elena Virginia Costantinescu: The Madonna seen by evangelist Luke, Madonna seen by evangelist St. John, Maria Magdalene; and works of R. Merussi: Annunciation, Last Supper, Burial and Resurrection of the Lord.

Two alternatives Ways of the Cross (2000): one is a work of Carlo Sismonda, painter and musician (2000), the other a copy of G. Vicentini.

=== The left corridor ===
Baptismal font: The Baptism of Christ (1960–1962) is the work of Gregor Sciltian (1900–1985).

First chapel: of the Perpetual Suffrage, decorated by the Brasini. Here one finds the Burial of the Lord (1959), work of F. M. Trombini.

Altar of the Heart of Jesus, work of R. Merussi (1984).

Second chapel: It is overseen by a painting of the Madonna of Pompei. The altar above is a work of the Berninian school. In the angles of the chapel there are the models of 4 Evangelists done by Brasini, originally intended to be sculpted in stone and put in the pinnacles of the facade of the Basilica. To the left is the tomb of the Cardinal Arturo Tabera, a Claretian missionary, who died in 1975. The stone, to the right, bears the dates of the consecration of Rome and of the world to the Heart of Mary (1953). At the entrance of the chapel are found two busts – to the right by Brasini, in marble, of Silvio Canevari (+1932), and on the left, that of Pious XII, in plaster, by L.M. Sibio (1969).

=== The main altar ===
Large mosaic of the Heart of Mary, patroness of the Basilica, work of the Vatican School, reproduction of the painting of the Jesuit Sebastiano Gallés (1870), surrounded by angels in bronze of Domenico Ponzi and by relics of saints. Behind it are seen the pipes of the church organ, of the factory of V. zo Mascioni (1954), Cuvio (Varese).

=== The right corridor ===
Altar of the Crucified One (XX s.). The inscription in Latin: WE ADORE YOU, CHRIST, AND BLESS YOU BECAUSE WITH YOUR HOLY CROSS YOU REDEEMED THE WORLD.

First Chapel: Mosaic of St Joseph by the Vatican School, reproduction of a painting of Professor Gaudenzi. To the left is the tomb of the Cardinal Arcadio M Larraona, a Claretian Missionary, Prefect of the Congregation for Divine Worship, who died in 1973.

Altar of St. Anthony M. Claret, work of R Merussi (1984). It is followed in the intermediate space by the monument to the Martyrs of Barbastro (1992).

Second Chapel: of the Blessed Sacrament, with altars and decoration by Brasini. In the stained-glass window (by J. Grau Garriga) the imagine of Saint Anthony M. Claret. On the top the inscription in Latin: THIS IS THE BREAD OF ANGELS, MADE FOOD FOR PILGRIMS. WE ADORE ETERNALLY THE SACRAMENT.

In the baptistery there are modern paintings by the Armenian Gregorio Sciltian (1900–1985).

== The dome ==
The dome is an incomplete work. With its 23 m. it would have been the largest dome in Rome after that of the Vatican (42 m). The plastic model of the dome can be seen in the interior angle of the central right pillar. In the drum of the dome one reads this inscription in Latin: WE ENTRUST AND CONSECRATE OURSELVES TO YOUR IMMACULATE HEART. (PIOUS XII).

== The crypt ==
To the right corner of the entrance is the opening to the Presepe Monumentale (Monumental Crib), work of Fulgencio Martínez, situated in the older inferior crypt (11). In this crypt was the old parish before the inauguration of the Basilica. In it, among other events, were baptized a few members of the Spanish royal family, Mons. Oscar Romero, the martyr of El Salvador, celebrated his first Mass and was the place where Claretians celebrated the beatification of Saint Anthony Mary Claret.

== List of Cardinal Protectors ==
- Ángel Herrera Oria, 25 February 1965 – 28 July 1968
- Arcadio Larraona Saralegui, CMF 28 April 1969 – 7 May 1972
- Lawrence Trevor Picachy, SJ 24 May 1976 – 29 November 1992
- Julius Riyadi Darmaatmadja, SJ 26 November 1993 – present

Preceded by Santa Sabina	Landmarks of Rome; Sacro Cuore di Maria	Succeeded by Sacro Cuore di Cristo Re
