= San Camillo de Lellis =

Roman Catholic basilica, Rome, Italy

Basilica of San Camillo de Lellis
- Basilica of St. Camillus de Lellis (in English); Basilica Sancti Camilli de Lellis ad Hortus Sallustianos (in Latin)
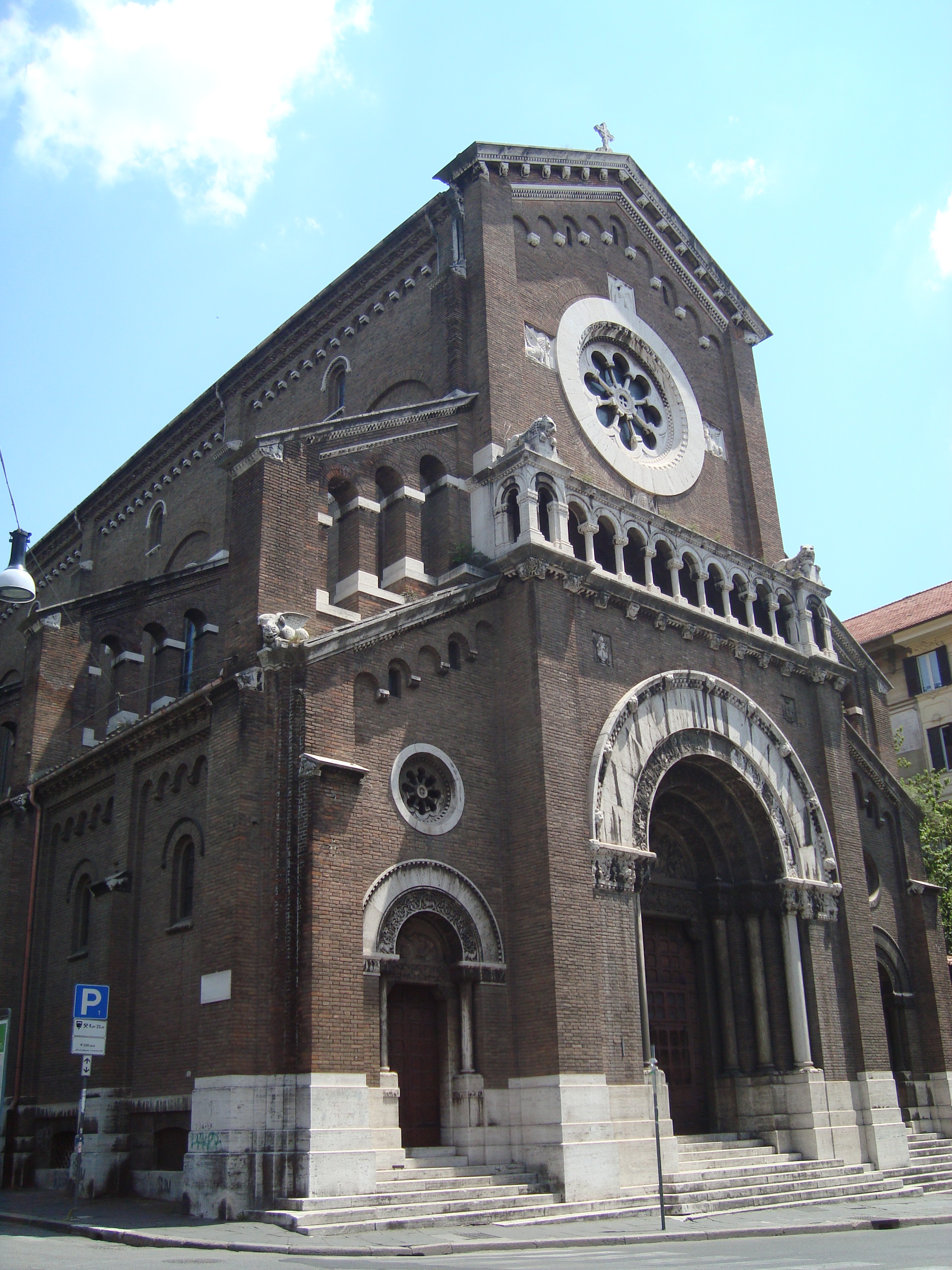
- West front
- Click on the map for a fullscreen view
- 41°54′25.27″N 12°29′39.86″E
- Location: Via Sallustiana 24, Rome
- Country: Italy
- Denomination: Roman Catholic
- Tradition: Roman Rite

History
- Status: Titular church
- Dedication: Camillus de Lellis
- Consecrated: 1910

Architecture
- Architect: Tullio Passarelli
- Architectural type: Church
- Groundbreaking: 1906
- Completed: 1910

Administration
- Province: Diocese of Rome

The Basilica of San Camillo de Lellis (Italian: Basilica di San Camillo de Lellis) is a church on Via Sallustiana, Rome, Italy. It is dedicated to Saint Camillus de Lellis (1550–1614).

== History ==
The church was built under Pope Pius X, with construction (under the architect Tullio Passarelli) commencing in 1906 and the first stone being laid by Cardinal Antonio Agliardi. It was consecrated and made a parochial church in 1910, granted to the Chierici Regolari Ministri degli Infermi, the Priest Ministers of the Sick, the order founded by Camillus. In 1965, Pope Paul VI elevated the church to the status of minor basilica and it became the seat of the cardinal's title of S. Camilli de Lellis ad Hortus Sallustianos. Juan Luis Cipriani Thorne has been the cardinal protector since 2001.

== Architecture ==
=== Exterior ===
The façade, by Passarelli, is in the Neo-Gothic style of Lombardy. It is covered with red stone, with decorative elements in travertine. Before it is a large staircase. There are three doorways, each with a lunette with bas-relief above. Over the central one is Christ presenting Saint Camillus to the Sick, to the sides are Christ between Children and The Pardon of the Adulteress. Between the two stories is a gallery decorated with symbols of the Evangelists.

Adjacent to the church is the house of the Priest Ministers of the Sick.

=== Interior ===
The church has a Latin cross plan with three aisles divided by pillars that support arches. In a niche by the high altar is a statue of Saint Camillus by Alberto Galli, made in 1911. There is a side altar dedicated to the Blessed Virgin.

== Cardinal Protectors ==
Pope Paul VI established it as titular church on 25 May 1965.

- Paul Zoungrana, M.Afr. (25 May 1965 appointed – 4 June 2000 died)
- Juan Luis Cipriani Thorne, (21 February 2001 appointed – present)

Preceded by Santi Bonifacio ed Alessio	Landmarks of Rome; San Camillo de Lellis	Succeeded by San Carlo al Corso
