= Archdiocese of Ayacucho =

Roman Catholic archdiocese in Peru

Coordinates: 13.1606°S 74.2248°W

Archdiocese of Ayacucho Archidioecesis Ayacuquensis o Huamangensis

Catholic
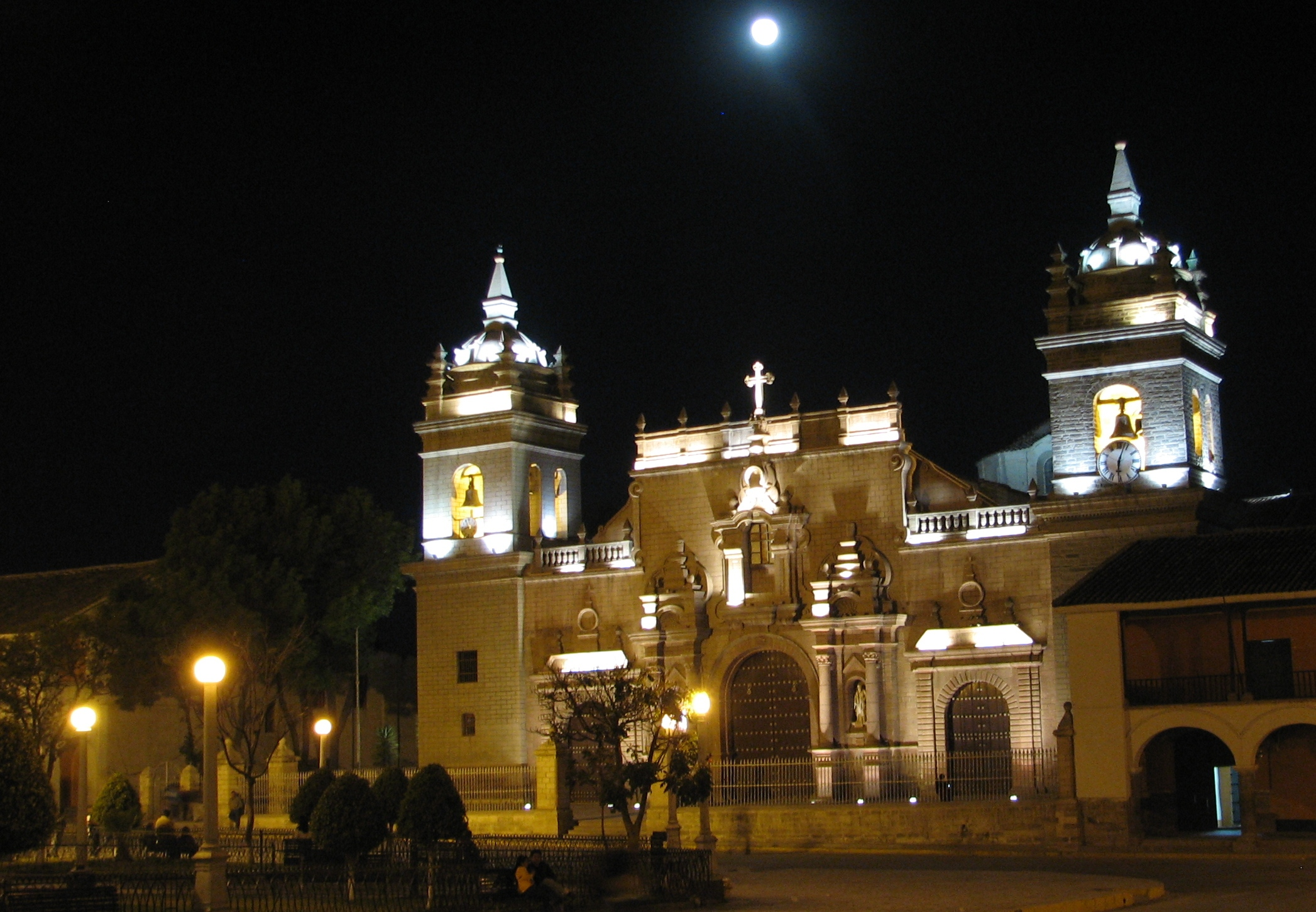
- Cathedral of Ayacucho

Location
- Country: Peru

Statistics
- Area: 26,777 km^{2} (10,339 sq mi)
- Population: Total; Catholics: (as of 2006); 511,000; 297,000 (58.1%)

Information
- Rite: Latin Rite
- Cathedral: Catedral Basílica Santa María

Current leadership
- Pope: Leo XIV
- Bishop: Salvador Piñeiro

Map

Website
- www.arquidiocesisdeayacucho.org

The Roman Catholic Archdiocese of Ayacucho o Huamanga (Latin: Ayacuquensis o Huamangensis) is an archdiocese in the south-central Andes of Peru that was erected in the early 17th century, promoted to a metropolitan archdiocese in 1966 and covers the city of Ayacucho. Its archbishop—Archbishop Salvador Piñeiro García-Calderón has been leading the Archdiocese since 2011—is also the ecclesiastical provincial for the Diocese of Huancavelica and the Territorial Prelature of Caravelí.

== History ==
- 20 July 1609: Established as Diocese of Huamanga from the Diocese of Cusco, suffragan of the archdioceses of Lima
- 1838: Diocese renamed Diocese of Ayacucho
- 30 June 1966: Promoted as Metropolitan Archdiocese of Ayacucho
- 2009: the Archdiocese celebrated its 400th anniversary.

== Province ==
The archdiocese includes the Peruvian region of Ayacucho, except for the provinces of Parinacochas and Paucar del Sara Sara and part of the province of Lucanas, which belong to the territorial prelature of Caravelí. The territory covers 21,749 km² and is divided into 50 parishes.

== Bishops ==
=== Ordinaries ===
- Agustín de Carvajal, O.S.A. (7 May 1612 – 19 Aug 1618 Died)
- Francisco Verdugo Cabrera (14 Mar 1622 – 20 Jul 1636 Died)
- Gabriel de Zarate, O.P. (14 Dec 1637 – 1638 Died)
- Antonio Corderiña Vega, O.S.A. (26 May 1642 – 1649 Died)
- Andrés García de Zurita (1649 – 4 Apr 1650 Appointed, Bishop of Trujillo)
- Francisco de Godoy (2 May 1650 – 1 Sep 1659 Appointed, Bishop of Trujillo)
- Cipriano Medina, O.P. (16 Feb 1660 – 1664 Died)
- Vasco Jacinto de Contreras y Valverde (7 Jun 1666 – 1668 Died)
- Cristóbal de Castilla y Zamora (11 Jun 1668 – 8 Nov 1677 Appointed, Archbishop of La Plata o Charcas)
- Sancho de Andrade de Figueroa (12 Jun 1679 – 15 Nov 1688 Appointed, Bishop of Quito)
- Francisco Luis de Bruna Rico (6 Dec 1688 – 1689 Died)
- Mateo Delgado (12 Dec 1689 – Jul 1695 Died)
- Diego Ladrón de Guevara (11 Apr 1699 – 15 Sep 1704 Appointed, Bishop of Quito)
- Francisco de Deza y Ulloa (17 Dec 1716 – 22 Apr 1722 Died)
- Alfonso Roldán, O.S.Bas. (30 Aug 1723 – 22 Feb 1741 Died)
- Miguel Bernardino de la Fuenta y Rojas (7 Aug 1741 – 1742 Died)
- Francisco Gutiérrez Galeano, O. de M. (25 Jan 1745 – 12 Oct 1748 Died)
- Felipe Manrique de Lara y Polanco (23 Feb 1750 – 31 Jan 1763 Died)
- José Luis de Lila y Moreno, O.S.A. (20 Aug 1764 – 25 Dec 1768 Died)
- Miguel Moreno y Ollo (12 Mar 1770 – Feb 1780 Died)
- Francisco López Sánchez (10 Dec 1781 – 2 Mar 1790 Died)
- Bartolomé Fabro Palacios (11 Apr 1791 – 10 Jul 1795 Died)
- Francisco Matienzo (27 Jun 1796 – 1802 Died)
- José Antonio Martínez de Aldunate (26 Mar 1804 – 8 Apr 1811 Died)
- José Vicente Silva Avilés y Olave Salaverría (15 Mar 1815 – 26 Oct 1816 Died)
- Pedro Gutiérrez de Cos y Saavedra Seminario (16 Mar 1818 – 13 Mar 1826 Confirmed, Bishop of Puerto Rico)
- Juan Rodríguez Reymúndez (17 Sep 1838 Confirmed – Did Not Take Effect)
- Santiago José O’ Phelan Recabarren (12 Jul 1841 Confirmed – 22 Sep 1857 Died)
- José Francisco Ezequiel Moreyra (27 Mar 1865 – 23 Mar 1874 Died)
- Juan José de Polo Valenzuela (17 Sep 1875 – 2 Nov 1882 Died)
- Julian Cáceres Negrón (19 Jan 1893 – 21 Feb 1900 Resigned)
- Fidel Olivas Escudero (19 Apr 1900 – 12 Apr 1935 Died)
- Francesco Solano Muente y Campos, O.F.M. (30 May 1936 – 21 Jul 1939 Resigned)
- Victorino Alvarez, S.D.B. (15 Dec 1940 – 2 Mar 1958 Died)
- Otoniel Alcedo Culquicóndor, S.D.B. (28 Aug 1958 – 20 Nov 1979 Resigned) Diocese elevated to Archdiocese 3 June 1966
- Federico Richter Fernandez-Prada, O.F.M. (20 Nov 1979 – 23 May 1991 Retired)
- Juan Luis Cipriani Thorne (13 May 1995 – 9 Jan 1999 Appointed, Archbishop of Lima) (Cardinal in 2001)
- Luis Abilio Sebastiani Aguirre, S.M. (13 Jun 2001 – 6 Aug 2011 Retired)
- Salvador Piñeiro García-Calderón (6 Aug 2011 – )

=== Coadjutor bishops ===
- Andrés García de Zurita (1648-1649)
- Federico Richter Fernandez-Prada, O.F.M. (1975-1979)

=== Auxiliary bishops ===
- Elías Prado Tello (1972-1985)
- Juan Luis Cipriani Thorne (1988-1995), appointed Archbishop here; future Cardinal
- Gabino Miranda Melgarejo (2004-2013), resigned; later that year, he was excardinated, or dismissed, and laicized -returned to the lay state- for sexual misconduct

== Suffragan dioceses ==
- Diocese of Huancavélica
- Territorial Prelature of Caravelí

== See also ==
- Roman Catholicism in Peru
- Peruvian Episcopal Conference

== Sources ==
- GCatholic.org
- Catholic Hierarchy
- Diocese website
