= Luis Abilio Sebastiani Aguirre =

Peruvian Catholic priest (1935–2020)

Luis Abilio Sebastiani Aguirre SM
- Archbishop of Ayacucho
- Church: Catholic Church
- Archdiocese: Archdiocese of Ayacucho
- In office: 13 June 2001 – 6 August 2011
- Predecessor: Juan Luis Cipriani Thorne
- Successor: Salvador Piñeiro García-Calderón
- Previous post: Bishop of Tarma (1992-2001)

Orders
- Ordination: 23 April 1962
- Consecration: 3 January 1993 by Luigi Dossena

Personal details
- Born: 22 February 1935 Callao, Peru
- Died: 10 August 2020 (aged 85) Lima, Peru

Luis Abilio Sebastiani Aguirre (22 February 1935 – 10 August 2020) was a Peruvian Roman Catholic archbishop.

Sebastiani Aguirre was born in Peru and was ordained to the priesthood in 1962. He served as bishop of the Roman Catholic Diocese of Tarma, Peru, from 1992 to 2001 and then served as archbishop of the Roman Catholic Archdiocese of Ayacucho, Peru, from 2001 to 2011.
