= Juan Luis Cipriani Thorne =

Peruvian prelate of the Catholic Church

His Eminence Juan Luis Cipriani Thorne
- Cardinal; Archbishop Emeritus of Lima
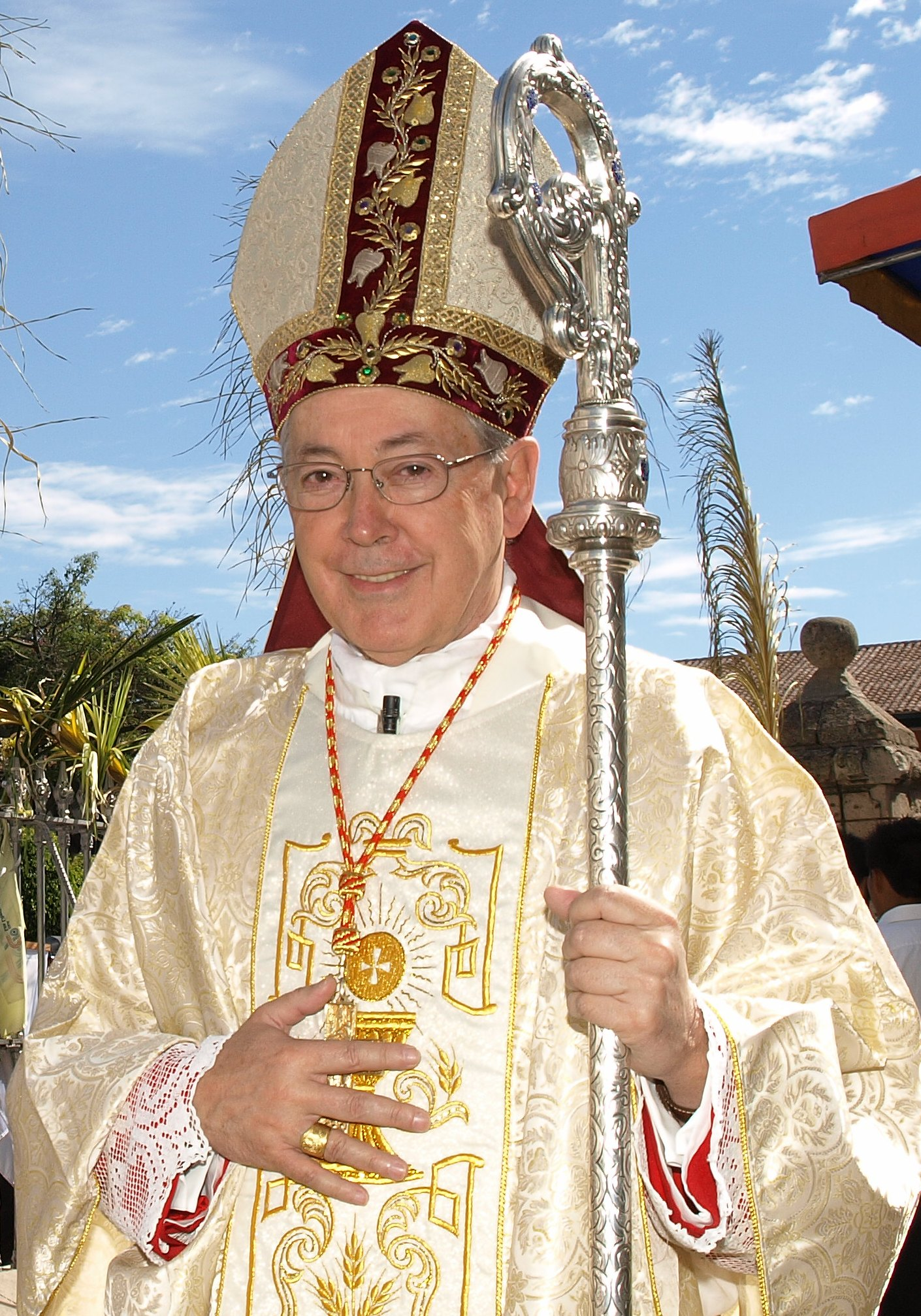
- Church: Roman Catholic Church
- Archdiocese: Lima
- See: Lima
- Appointed: 9 January 1999
- Installed: 30 January 1999
- Term ended: 25 January 2019
- Predecessor: Augusto Vargas Alzamora
- Successor: Carlos Castillo Mattasoglio
- Other posts: Cardinal-Priest of San Camillo de Lellis (2001-); Member of the Council for the Economy (2014-)
- Previous posts: Auxiliary Bishop of Ayacucho (1988–95); Titular Bishop of Turuzi (1988–95); Archbishop of Ayacucho (1995–99)

Orders
- Ordination: 21 August 1977
- Consecration: 3 July 1988 by Juan Landázuri Ricketts
- Created cardinal: 21 February 2001 by Pope John Paul II
- Rank: Cardinal-Priest

Personal details
- Born: Juan Luis Cipriani Thorne; 28 December 1943 (age 82) Lima, Peru
- Denomination: Roman Catholic
- Parents: Enrique Cipriani Vargas; Isabel Thorne Larrabure
- Education: Universidad Nacional de Ingeniería; University of Navarra
- Motto: Consummati in unum
- Coat of arms

Styles of Juan Luis Cipriani Thorne
- Reference style: His Eminence
- Spoken style: Your Eminence
- Informal style: Cardinal
- See: Lima

Juan Luis Cipriani Thorne (born 28 December 1943) is a Peruvian Catholic who served as Archbishop of Lima from 1999 to 2019. He has been a bishop since 1988 and was made a cardinal in 2001.

== Biography ==
=== Early life and career ===
Cipriani attended the Colegio Santa Maria Marianistas, a Catholic school, and as a young man he was a member of the Peruvian national basketball team for six years. He studied industrial engineering at the Universidad Nacional de Ingeniería in Lima, Peru, and worked as an engineer.

He later joined Opus Dei and was eventually ordained priest on 21 August 1977. He earned a doctorate in theology from the University of Navarra. He did pastoral work in Lima, taught at the Pontifical Faculty of Theology, and was regional vicar for Peru and Vice-Chancellor of the University of Piura.

=== Service in Ayacucho ===
On 23 May 1988, Pope John Paul II appointed him titular Bishop of Turuzi and Auxiliary Bishop of Ayacucho and he received his episcopal consecration on 3 July from Cardinal Juan Landázuri Ricketts. He was named Apostolic Administrator of the Archdiocese upon the retirement of Archbishop Federico Richter Fernandez-Prada on 23 May 1991. He was named Archbishop of Ayacucho on 13 May 1995. He held an appointment in the Roman Curia as consultor of the Congregation for the Clergy from 1990 to 1999.

Ayacucho was the center of Peru's battle against the Shining Path, a violent revolutionary movement. Cipriani became an uncompromising voice for military suppression. In 1991, he said that "Most human rights organizations are just covering the tails of political movements, almost all of them Marxist and Maoist." In October 1992, after the capture of Abimael Guzmán, leader of the Shining Path, Cipriani advocated he be executed. In July 1993, after the Peruvian Bishops' Conference called the death penalty a "grave sin", he said: "We can not allow the country not to support the death penalty because of fear, the fear and cowardice of a few.... The world changes day by day and not in favor of cowards. We are in a time of firmness, clarity and manhood." In 1995, he backed legislation to shield the Peruvian military and police from prosecution for activities undertaken as part of the suppression of radical movements.

Cipriani was chancellor of the Pontifical Catholic University of Peru (PUCP) in 1997 when it barred a gay student organisation, Parenthesis Collective (Colectivo Paréntesis), from holding events. He had a pamphlet titled "Sexual Identity: Is It Possible to Choose?" prepared and distributed. It described homosexuality as a curable illness.

During the 1996–1997 Japanese embassy hostage crisis, he was named by President Fujimori to a trio of mediators to seek a peaceful resolution and the release of the hostages.

=== Service in Lima ===
Pope John Paul II named him Archbishop of Lima in 1999. In January 2000 he was elected second vice-president of the Peruvian Bishop's Conference and head of its Commission for Education.

Cipriani was made Cardinal-Priest of San Camillo de Lellis by Pope John Paul II in the consistory of 21 February 2001. He was the first priest incardinated into Opus Dei to be made a cardinal. On 15 May 2001, John Paul named him a member of two bodies of the Roman Curia, the Congregation for Divine Worship and the Discipline of the Sacraments and the Congregation for the Causes of Saints.

He was one of the cardinal electors who participated in the 2005 papal conclave that elected Pope Benedict XVI.

Cipriani regularly denounced efforts to recognize same-sex relationships. In 2005, Cipriani commented on the recent legalization of same-sex unions in Spain. He denounced the existence of a worldwide campaign and warned that by legalising same-sex unions, society is disfigured. He said: "In today's world, evil disguises itself as good, it is imposed on others, and woe to him who does not accept it!". He called on the faithful not to refer to relationships that "are not between a man and a woman" as marriage. He said: "Call it what you want but don't sell damaged goods, don't traffic in that dictatorship of moral relativism in which there is nothing good, only opinions and trends of thought." In 2013, he opposed legislation to create same-sex civil unions in Peru. He called it "an old strategy" that "starts by putting the shoe on the door with this law, and ends up asking for marriage between homosexuals". He said everyone was free to enter into contracts with one another, "but it is not necessary to start making a caricature of marriage and then destroy it".

In April 2008 he banned the practice of receiving Communion in the hand, requiring instead that the faithful receive on the tongue. He said that "the relaxed attitude of many priests" was to blame for a decline in reverence for the Eucharist among the faithful.

On 19 July 2011, he was named a member of the Pontifical Commission for Latin America by Pope Benedict XVI.

From 2007 to 2016, he fought with the Pontifical Catholic University of Peru, which resisted his attempts to assert control over its financial and academic affairs. Though he was supported by the Vatican under Pope Benedict for several years, the dispute was eventually resolved by the intervention of Pope Francis with an accord that sidelined Cipriani.

He was one of the cardinal electors who participated in the 2013 papal conclave that elected Pope Francis. He was mentioned at the time as a possible candidate for election to the papacy, though not among the most likely.

In a televised discussion about abortion on the program Diálogos de fe, he explained, "Statistics tell us that girls get abortions, but it is not because these girls were violated, but because, often, the woman puts herself on provoking display." The Archdiocese responded to widespread criticism of that statement by explaining that Cipriani was characterizing the immodest presentation of women on television.

Pope Francis accepted his resignation as Archbishop of Lima on 25 January 2019. Though nominated four times, he was never elected to head the Peruvian Bishops' Conference. He was also Grand Chancellor of the Pontifical Catholic University of Peru.

== Misconduct ==
=== Neglect of Sodalitium Christiane Vitae sex abuse reports ===
Cipriani was criticized for neglecting reports of sexual abuse which had been made against members of the Catholic church's Peru-based Sodalitium Christianae Vitae society. During Cirpiani's time as Archbishop of Lima, the first allegations against Sodalitium aired publicly in a series of articles in 2000 in the magazine Gente by former Sodalitium member José Enrique Escardó, with the first formal accusations later being presented to the church in 2011. However, he was slow to action. The sex abuse case against the Sodalitium would not even move forward until journalists Pedro Salinas and Paola Ugaz exposed the practices of Sodalitium in their 2015 book "Half Monks, Half Soldiers." Speaking to the Associated Press on 25 January 2025, Escardó stated that "Cardinal Cipriani was the Opus Dei cardinal that Sodalitium needed."

=== Sex abuse allegation and Vatican sanctions ===
On 25 January 2025, Cipriani made public that the Vatican had sanctioned him in December 2019 following allegations that he committed an act of sexual abuse in 1983, also stating, however, that two months later, in February 2020 Pope Francis personally allowed him to resume pastoral work. The sex abuse allegation was first made against Cipriani in August 2018. However, Cipriani denies any wrongdoing, saying:

"I want to clarify that the things described are completely false. I haven’t committed any crime, nor have I sexually abused anyone either in 1983 nor before nor after."

A Vatican spokesman said in January 2025 that some restrictions on Cipriani appeared to still be in force, including limits on him making public statements as well as wearing cardinal vestments. He was thus widely criticized when he publicly wore traditional cardinal garb while mourning the death of Pope Francis at St. Peter's Basilica in April 2025.

== Human rights record ==
Peru's Truth Commission investigated human rights abuses committed by government forces during the 1980s and 1990s. It concluded that Cipriani had failed to defend human rights while auxiliary bishop and archbishop of Ayacucho. Cipriani rejected the report's findings which was partly accepted by the public. The Commission cited testimony by victims of the political violence in Ayacucho, the birthplace of the PCP-Shining Path. Its Final Report identified Cipriani as the only religious leader that did not support the work of Peru's Human Rights Coordinator, "whose activities he repeatedly pronounced himself in opposition to".

The Commission wrote:

"Every day people disappeared in Ayacucho in those years, it was a very serious problem, as well as torture and murder, but Mgr. Cipriani never questioned the human rights violations committed by the forces of order, on the contrary, held constant and "It can not be said that Peru is a place where human rights are not respected". However, he acknowledged "the existence of two or three isolated situations of which derision is being made". For this reason he constantly criticized the reports of international organizations as an intrusion into the country. At the door of the archbishopric, a blackboard said: 'No claims on Human Rights are accepted'".

Regarding the Peruvian Coordinator of Human Rights, an umbrella organizations of secular and church groups devoted to protecting human rights in Peru, Cipriani said:

"In a violent context like that of Ayacucho, the deaths, disappearances and abuses are part of the war. Defenders of Human Rights will call it a dirty war. I believe that the Armed Forces had to use these mechanisms to know how and where these issues occurred. And when these means were used, of course there were dead from one side and the other.... I have come to the forefront of the poor and of those who have massacred this city. And during that bustle I have not seen those of the Coordinator of Human Rights, that ridiculousness".

In March 1991, Ciprani said that "As long as we do not state clearly that human rights are not absolute untouchable values, but are permanently subject to the limits set by human duties, it is impossible to deal effectively with the evils we suffer, especially immorality In public functions and terrorism. Let's put it briefly: Most institutions called "human rights defense" are the backbones of political movements, almost always of the Marxist and Maoist type". In 1995 he explained why he endorsed an amnesty for state military officials accused of war crimes: "It is a political decision, to achieve internal peace, because it is necessary to forgive to achieve reconciliation.

Catholic Church titles
Preceded by Armand Toasy	— TITULAR — Titular Bishop of Turuzi; 23 May 1988 – 13 May 1995	Succeeded by Juan Alberto Puiggari
Preceded by Elías Prado Tello	Auxiliary Bishop of Ayachucho; 23 May 1988 – 13 May 1995	Succeeded by Gabino Miranda Melgarejo
Preceded by Federico Richter Fernandez-Prada	Archbishop of Ayacucho; 13 May 1995 – 9 January 1999	Succeeded by Luis Abilio Sebastiani Aguirre
Preceded by Augusto Vargas Alzamora	Archbishop of Lima; 9 January 1999 – 25 January 2019	Succeeded by Carlos Castillo Mattasoglio
Preceded by Paul Zoungrana	Cardinal-Priest of San Camillo de Lellis; 21 February 2001 –	Incumbent
