= General principles of European Union law =

Principles applied by European courts

The general principles of European Union law are general principles of law which are applied by the European Court of Justice and the national courts of the member states when determining the lawfulness of legislative and administrative measures within the European Union. General principles of European Union law may be derived from common legal principles in the various EU member states, or general principles found in international law or European Union law. General principles of law should be distinguished from rules of law as principles are more general and open-ended in the sense that they need to be honed to be applied to specific cases with correct results.

The general principles of European Union law are rules of law which a European Union judge, sitting for example in the European Court of Justice, has to find and apply but not create. Particularly for fundamental rights, Article 6(3) of the Treaty on European Union provided:

Fundamental rights, as guaranteed by the European Convention for the Protection of Human Rights and Fundamental Freedoms and as they result from the constitutional traditions common to the Member States, shall constitute general principles of the Union's law.

Further, Article 340 of the Treaty on the Functioning of the European Union (formerly Article 215 of the Treaty establishing the European Economic Community) expressly provides for the application of the "general principles common to the laws of the Member States" in the case of non-contractual liability.

In practice the European Court of Justice has applied general principles to all aspects of European Union law. In formulating general principles, European Union judges draw on a variety of sources, including: public international law and its general principles inherent to all legal systems; national laws of the member states, that is general principles common to the laws of all member states, general principles inferred from European Union law, and fundamental human rights. General principles are found and applied to avoid the denial of justice, fill gaps in European Union law and to strengthen the coherence of European Union law.

Accepted general principles of European Union Law include fundamental rights, proportionality, legal certainty, equality before the law, primacy of European Union law and subsidiarity. In Case T-74/00 Artegodan, the General Court (then Court of First Instance) appeared willing to extrapolate from the limited provision for the precautionary principle in environmental policy in Article 191(2) TFEU to a general principle of EU law.

== Fundamental rights ==
Fundamental rights, as in human rights, were first recognised by the European Court of Justice based on arguments developed by the German Constitutional Court in Stauder v City of Ulm Case 29/69 in relation to a European Community scheme to provide cheap butter to recipients of welfare benefits. When the case was referred to the European Court of Justice the ruling of the German Constitutional Court, the European Community could not "prejudice the fundamental human rights enshrined in the general principles of Community law and protected by the Court". This concept was further developed by the European Court of Justice in International Handelsgesellschaft v Einfuhr- und Vorratsstelle Getreide [1970] ECR 1125 Case 11/70 when it was held that "Respect for fundamental rights form an integral part of the general principles of law protected by the Court of Justice. The protection of such rights, whilst inspired by the constitutional traditions common to the member states, must be ensured within the framework of the structure and objectives of the Community." Subsequently, in J Nold v Commission Case 4/73 the European Court of Justice reiterated that human rights are an integral part of the general principles of European Union law and that as such the European Court of Justice was bound to draw inspiration from the constitutional traditions common to the member states. Therefore, the European Court of Justice cannot uphold measures which are incompatible with fundamental rights recognised and protected in the constitutions of member states. The European Court of Justice also found that "international treaties for the protection of human rights on which the member states have collaborated or of which they are signatories, can supply guidelines which should be followed within the framework of Community law."

=== The Charter of Fundamental Rights of the European Union ===
None of the original treaties establishing the European Union mention protection for fundamental rights. It was not envisaged for European Union measures, that is legislative and administrative actions by European Union institutions, to be subject to human rights. At the time the only concern was that member states should be prevented from violating human rights, hence the establishment of the European Convention on Human Rights in 1950 and the establishment of the European Court of Human Rights. The European Court of Justice recognised fundamental rights as general principle of European Union law as the need to ensure that European Union measures are compatible with the human rights enshrined in member states' constitution became ever more apparent. In 1999 the European Council set up a body tasked with drafting a European Charter of Human Rights, which could form the constitutional basis for the European Union and as such tailored specifically to apply to the European Union and its institutions. The Charter of Fundamental Rights of the European Union draws a list of fundamental rights from the European Convention on Human Rights and Fundamental Freedoms, the Declaration on Fundamental Rights produced by the European Parliament in 1989 and European Union Treaties.

The 2007 Lisbon Treaty explicitly recognised fundamental rights by providing in Article 6(1) that "The Union recognises the rights, freedoms and principles set out in the Charter of Fundamental Rights of the European Union of 7 December 2000, as adopted at Strasbourg on 12 December 2007, which shall have the same legal value as the Treaties." Therefore, the Charter of Fundamental Rights of the European Union has become an integral part of European Union law, codifying the fundamental rights which were previously considered general principles of European Union law. In effect, after the Lisbon Treaty, the Charter and the convention now co-exist under European Union law, though the former is enforced by the European Court of Justice in relation to European Union measures, and the latter by the European Court of Human Rights in relation to measures by member states.

=== The common standard of protection ===
The "question of a possible infringement of fundamental rights by a measure of the [EU] institutions can only be judged in the light of [EU] law itself"; "the freedom to pursue trade or professional activities" must "be viewed in light of the social function of the activities": Case C-159/90 SPUC v Grogan.

In Case C-112/00 Schmidberger, the right of free speech limited – but did not unjustifiably violate – the free movement of goods. The right to strike and to collective action can constitutes a restriction of freedom of establishment, but it may "be justified by an overriding reason of public interest": Case C-438/05 Viking Line and Case C-341/05 Laval. Similarly see Case C-36/02 Omega.

In Joined Cases C-402/05 P and C-415/05 P Kadi (Kadi I), Council regulations based on United Nations Security Council decisions were reviewed under EC human rights standards and consequently annulled. In its sequel Kadi II (C-595/10 P) the Court of Justice, by dismissing the appeal, confirmed the General Court's annulment of restrictive measures directed against Kadi.

EU law does not extend to combating discrimination on grounds of health: Case C-13/05 Sonia Chacon Navas. There is a general principle of law in all European Union member states against discrimination, and in favour of equal treatment: Kücükdeveci v Swedex GmbH & Co KG.

=== The scope of human rights in the EU ===
In principle, the scope of EU human rights protection follows the field of EU law. However, even when a state is derogating from a Union obligation, it must respect human rights standards: Case C-260/89 ERT. Even when the link between the issue at hand and EU law is tenuous, EU law may still apply and human right standards thus invoked: Case C-60/00 Mary Carpenter.

== Legal certainty ==
The concept of legal certainty has been recognised one of the general principles of European Union law by the European Court of Justice since the 1960s. It is an important general principle of international law and public law, which predates European Union law. As a general principle in European Union law it means that the law must be certain, in that it is clear and precise, and its legal implications foreseeable, especially when applied to financial obligations. The adoption of laws which will have legal effect in the European Union must have a proper legal basis. Legislation in member states which implements European Union law must be worded so that it is clearly understandable by those who are subject to the law.

=== Clarity ===
Legal certainty, part of the EU legal order, "requires that legal rules be clear and precise, and aims to ensure that situations and legal relationships governed by [Union] law remain foreseeable": Case C-63/93 Duff and Others v Minister for Agriculture and Food.

Individuals "should have the benefit of a clear and precise legal situation enabling them to ascertain the full extent of their rights and, where appropriate, to rely on them before the national courts"; this is not the case where a Member State does not transpose a directive correctly, despite case-law interpreting national legislation in accordance with the directive: Case C-236/95 Commission v Greece.

=== Legitimate expectation ===
The doctrine of legitimate expectation, which has its roots in the principles of legal certainty and good faith, is also a central element of the general principle of legal certainty in European Union law. The legitimate expectation doctrine holds that and that "those who act in good faith on the basis of law as it is or seems to be should not be frustrated in their expectations". This means that a European Union institution, once it has induced a party to take a particular course of action, must not renege on its earlier position if doing so would cause the party to suffer loss.

The European Court of Justice has considered the legitimate expectation doctrine in cases where violation of the general principle of legal certainty was alleged in numerous cases involving agricultural policy and European Council regulations, with the leading case being Mulder v Minister van Landbouw en Visserij [1988] ECR 2321 Case 120/86. Where a producer "has been encouraged by a Community measure to suspend the marketing [of his products] for a limited period in the general interest and against payment of a premium he may legitimately expect not to be subject, upon the expiry of his undertaking, to restrictions which specifically affect him precisely because he availed himself of the possibilities offered by the Community provisions": Case 120/86 Mulder v Minister van Landbouw en Visserij.

"The principle of the protection of legitimate expectations may be invoked as against Community rules, only to the extent that the Community itself has previously created a situation which can give rise to a legitimate expectation": C-177/90 Kühn v Landwirtschaftskammer Weser-Ems. This is confirmed in Duff: "economic agents cannot legitimately expect that they will not be subject to restrictions arising out of future rules of market or structural policy".

=== Non-retroactivity ===
In European Union law the general principle of legal certainty prohibits retroactive laws: laws should not take effect before they are published. The general principle also requires that sufficient information must be made public to enable parties to know what the law is and comply with it. For example, in Opel Austria v Council [1997] ECR II-39 Case T-115/94 The European Court of Justice held that European Council Regulation did not come into effect until it had been published. Opel had brought the action on the basis that the regulation in question violated the principle of legal certainty because it legally came into effect before it had been notified and the regulation published.

"Although in general the principle of legal certainty precludes a Community measure from taking effect from a point in time before its publication, it may exceptionally be otherwise where the purpose to be achieved so demands and where the legitimate expectations of those concerned are duly respected": Case 99/78 Decker v Hauptzollamt Landau.

=== Misuse of powers ===
The misuse of powers test is another significant element of the general principle of legal certainty in European Union law. It holds that a lawful power must not be exercised for any other purpose than that for which it was conferred. According to the misuse of power test, a decision by a European Union institution is only a misuse of power if "it appears, on the basis of objective, relevant and consistent evidence, to have been adopted with the exclusive or main purpose of achieving end[s] other than those stated." A rare instance where the European Court of Justice has held that a European Union institution has misused its powers, and therefore violated the general principle of legal uncertainty, is Giuffrida v Commission [1976] ECR 1395 Case 105/75. The general principle of legal certainty is particularly stringently applied when European Union law imposes financial burdens on private parties.

== Proportionality ==
The legal concept of proportionality is recognised one of the general principles of European Union law by the European Court of Justice since the 1950s. It was first recognised by the European Court of Justice in Federation Charbonniere de Belgique v High Authority [1954] ECR 245 Case C8/55 and in Internationale Handelsgesellschaft v Einfuhr- und Vorratsstelle Getreide [1970] ECR 1125 Case 11/70 the European Advocate General provided an early formulation of the general principle of proportionality in stating that "the individual should not have his freedom of action limited beyond the degree necessary in the public interest". The general concept of proportionality has since been further developed, notably in R v Minister of Agriculture, Fisheries and Food ex parte Fedesa [1990] ECR 1–4023 Case C-331/88 in which a European directive prohibiting the use of certain hormonal substances in livestock farming was challenged. In its ruling the European Court of Justice held that by virtue of the general principle of proportionality the lawfulness of the Directive depended on whether it was appropriate and necessary to achieve the objectives legitimately pursued by the law in question. When there was a choice between several appropriate measures the least onerous must be adopted, and any disadvantage caused must not be disproportionate to the aims pursued. The principle of proportionality is also recognised in Article 5 of the EC Treaty, stating that "any action by the Community shall not go beyond what is necessary to achieve the objectives of this Treaty".

Prof. Grainne de Burca has therefore argued that the general principle in European Union law of proportionality entails a three-part test: 1) is the measure suitable to achieve a legitimate aim, 2) is the measure necessary to achieve that aim or are less restrictive means available, and 3) does the measure have an excessive effect on the applicant's interests. The general principle of proportionality therefore requires that a measure is both appropriate and necessary, and as such the European Court of Justice to review both the legality of a measure, but also to some extent the merit of legislative and administrative measures. Therefore, the general principle of European Union law of proportionality is often considered as the most far-reaching ground of judicial review and of particular importance in public law cases. However, because the proportionality concept potentially concerns the merits of a measure, European judges may defer to the choice of the authority which has adopted the measure, or make what are frequently political decisions. In Fedesa the European Court of Justice explained that "it must be states that in matters concerning the common agricultural policy the Community legislature has the discretionary power which corresponds to the political responsibilities given to it by... the Treaty. Consequently, the legality of a measure adopted in that sphere can be affected only if the measure is manifestly inappropriate having regard to the objective which the competent institution is seeking to pursue...".

"In order to establish whether a provision of Community law complies with the principle of proportionality, it must be ascertained [1] whether the means which it employs are suitable for the purpose of achieving the desired objective and [2] whether they do not go beyond what is necessary to achieve it": Case C-426/93 Germany v Council. This is confirmed in Case C-84/94 UK v Council (Working Time Directive): "the Council must be allowed a wide discretion in an area which, as here, involves the legislature in making social policy choices and requires it to carry out complex assessments. Judicial review of the exercise of that discretion must therefore be limited to examining whether it has been vitiated by manifest error or misuse of powers, or whether the institution concerned has manifestly exceeded the limits of its discretion".

=== Proportionality in Union action ===
"The obligation to purchase at [...] a disproportionate price constituted a discriminatory distribution of the burden of costs between the various agricultural sectors. Nor, moreover, was such an obligation necessary in order to attain the objective in view [...]. It could not therefore be justified [...]”: Case 114-76 Bela-Mühle v Grows-Farm.

=== Proportionality in state actions when implementing Union law ===
"Appraising the proportionality of national rules which pursue a legitimate aim under Community law involves weighing the national interest in attaining that aim against the Community interest in ensuring the free movement of goods. In that regard, in order to verify that the restrictive effects on intra-Community trade of the rules at issue do not exceed what is necessary to achieve the aim in view, it must be considered whether those effects are direct, indirect or purely speculative and whether those effects do not impede the marketing of imported products more than the marketing of national products. [...] Article 34 TFEU is to be interpreted as meaning that the prohibition which it lays down does not apply to national legislation prohibiting retailers from opening their premises on Sundays": Case C-169/91 Stoke-on-Trent and Norwich v B&Q.

"[The] prohibition of cold calling by the Member State from which the telephone call is made, with a view to protecting investor confidence in the financial markets of that State, cannot be considered to be inappropriate to achieve the objective of securing the integrity of those markets": Case C-384/93 Alpine Investments.

“[...] on a proper construction of [Article 34 TFEU], a Member State is not precluded from taking, on the basis of provisions of its domestic legislation, measures against an advertiser in relation to television advertising, provided that those provisions affect in the same way, in law and in fact, the marketing of domestic products and of those from other Member States, are necessary for meeting overriding requirements of general public importance or one of the aims laid down in [Article 36 TFEU], are proportionate for that purpose, and those aims or overriding requirements could not be met by measures less restrictive of intra-Community trade": Case C-34/95 De Agostini.

"The right to property, and likewise the freedom to pursue an economic activity, form part of the general principles of Community law. However, those principles are not absolute but must be viewed in relation to their social function. Consequently, the exercise of the right to property and the freedom to pursue an economic activity may be restricted, provided that any restrictions in fact correspond to objectives of general interest pursued by the Community and do not constitute in relation to the aim pursued a disproportionate and intolerable interference, impairing the very substance of the rights guaranteed": Joined Cases C-154/04 and C-155/04 The Queen, on the application of Alliance for Natural Health and Others v Secretary of State for Health and National Assembly for Wales.

=== Horizontal cases ===
A Member State may rely on the protection of fundamental rights, provided this was proportionate, to justify a restriction on Treaty freedoms: Case C-112/00 Schmidberger v Austria and Case C-36/02 Omega. But likewise, a trade union's right to collective action restricting Treaty freedoms is also subject to a review of proportionality: Case C-438/05 Viking Line and Case C-341/05 Laval.

== Good administration ==
A "Community law principle of good administration" was referred to by the Court of First Instance in Case T-211/02, Tideland Signal Ltd v Commission of the European Communities. The case raised issues about whether the Commission should have sought a clarification from a supplier tendering for a supply contract in the light of an ambiguity in its submission. In the circumstances of this particular case, it was "contrary to the requirements of good administration for an evaluation committee to reject the tender without exercising its power to seek clarification".

== Procedural autonomy ==
The national courts have procedural autonomy: "In the absence of Community rules on this subject, it is for the domestic legal system of each Member State to designate the courts having jurisdiction and to determine the procedural conditions governing actions at law intended to ensure the protection of the right which citizens have from the direct effect of Community law, it being understood that such conditions cannot be less favorable than those relating to similar actions of a domestic nature": Case 33/76 Rewe-Zentralfinanz eG and Rewe-Zentral AG v Landwirtschaftskammer für das Saarland.

== See also ==
- Charter of Fundamental Rights of the European Union
- Direct effect
- Gold-plating (European Union law)
- Incidental effect
- Indirect effect
- Internal Market
- Maximum harmonisation
- Minimum harmonisation
