= Federation =

Political union of partially self-governing territories under a national government

Federal states Unitary states

The spectrum of regional integration or separation

A federation (also called a federal state) is a union of partially self-governing provinces, states, or other regions under a federal government (federalism). In a federation, the self-governing status of the component units and the division of power between them and the central government are constitutionally entrenched and may not be altered unilaterally by either the central or constituent-unit authorities without following the constitutional amendment process.

Sovereign power is formally divided between a central authority and a number of constituent regions so that each region retains some degree of control over its internal affairs.

Some federal constitutions give the central authority exceptional powers that depart from the ordinary division of powers. In India, the Constitution requires the Union to protect states against internal disturbance and permits President's Rule when a state government cannot be carried on in accordance with the Constitution; it also authorizes Parliament to legislate for implementing treaties notwithstanding the ordinary federal allocation of legislative power. In Canada, section 91 of the Constitution Act, 1867 gives Parliament authority to make laws for the "Peace, Order, and good Government of Canada" in matters not assigned exclusively to the provinces. The Supreme Court of Canada has described the national-concern branch of this power as a rarely applied and strictly limited doctrine whose use must maintain provincial autonomy and the federal balance.

The governmental or constitutional structure found in a federation is described as federalist, or as an example of federalism, and is commonly contrasted with the unitary state. France and Japan, for example, are unitary states. The Austrian Empire was a unitary state with crown lands; after the dissolution of Austria-Hungary, the Republic of Austria became a federation of Länder under the 1920 constitution. Germany, with its 16 states, or Länder, and Nigeria, with its 36 states and federal capital territory, are examples of federations. Federations are often multi-ethnic and cover a large area of territory (such as Russia, the United States, Canada, India, Brazil, Pakistan or Australia), but neither is necessarily the case (such as Saint Kitts and Nevis or the Federated States of Micronesia). Roughly 40 per cent of the world's population lives in countries described as federal.

== History ==
Several ancient chiefdoms and kingdoms, such as the 4th-century-BCE League of Corinth, Noricum in Central Europe, and the Iroquois Confederacy in pre-Columbian North America, could be described as federations or confederations. The Old Swiss Confederacy is often regarded as a historical example of a confederation composed of largely autonomous cantons.

Several colonies and dominions in the New World consisted of autonomous provinces, transformed into federal states upon independence such as the United States, and various countries in Latin America (see Spanish American wars of independence). Some of the New World federations failed; the Federal Republic of Central America broke up into independent states less than 20 years after its founding. Others, such as Argentina, have shifted between federal, confederal, and unitary systems, before settling into federalism. Brazil became a federation only after the fall of the monarchy, and Venezuela became a federation after the Federal War.

Australia and Canada are also federations. They became federations while still part of the British Empire, and gradually evolved towards full independence.

Germany is another nation-state that has switched between confederal, federal and highly centralized forms. The North German Confederation, the succeeding German Empire and the Weimar Republic were federations.

Founded in 1922, the Soviet Union was formally a federation of Soviet republics, some of which contained autonomous republics and other autonomous units, though in practice highly centralized under the government of the Soviet Union. The Russian Federation has inherited a similar system.

India, Pakistan, Nigeria and Malaysia (then Federation of Malaya) became federations on or shortly before becoming independent from the British Empire.

In some recent cases, federations have been instituted as a measure to handle ethnic conflict within a state, such as Bosnia and Herzegovina, and Iraq since 2005 as well as Somalia since 2012.

With the United States Constitution having become effective on 4 March 1789, the United States is the oldest surviving federation, while the newest federation is Nepal, after its constitution went into effect on 20 September 2015.

== Federations and other forms of state ==
A map of the Russian Federation, showing its eighty-three federal subjects before the annexation of Crimea in 2014

A map of the Federative Republic of Brazil, showing its twenty-six constituent states and the Federal District

A map of the Federal Democratic Republic of Ethiopia, showing its regions

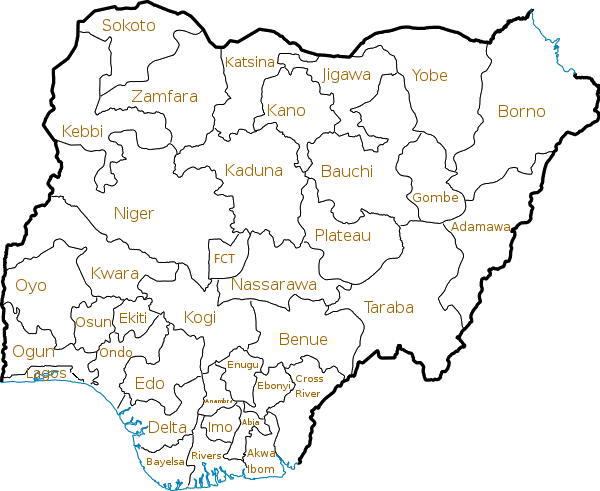
A map of the Federal Republic of Nigeria, showing its 36 states and the Federal Capital Territory

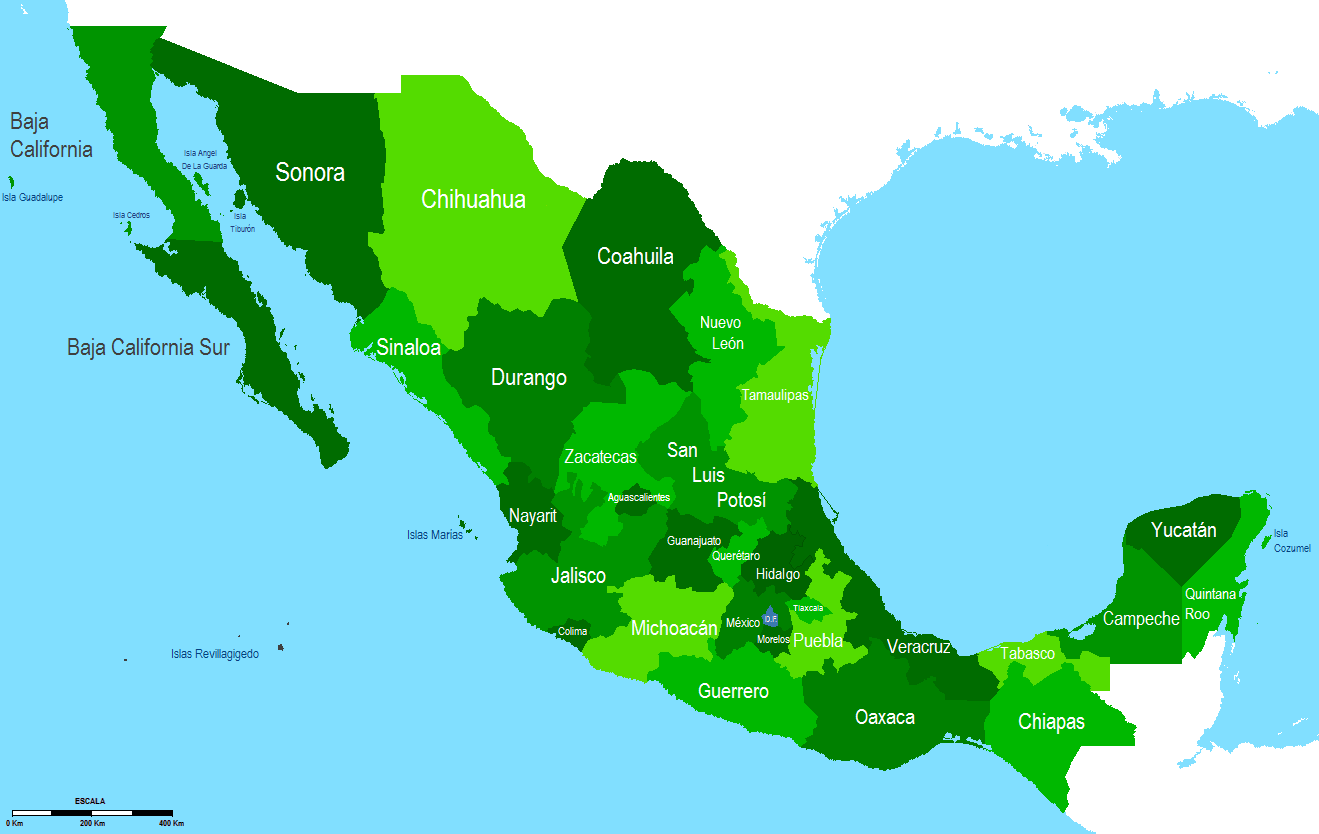
A map of the United Mexican States, showing its thirty-one constituent states and Mexico City

A map of the United States of America showing its fifty constituent states and the District of Columbia

A map of Canada showing its ten provinces and three territories

A map of the Commonwealth of Australia showing its six states and ten territories

A map of the Federal Republic of Germany showing its sixteen constituent states (Länder) including three city-states

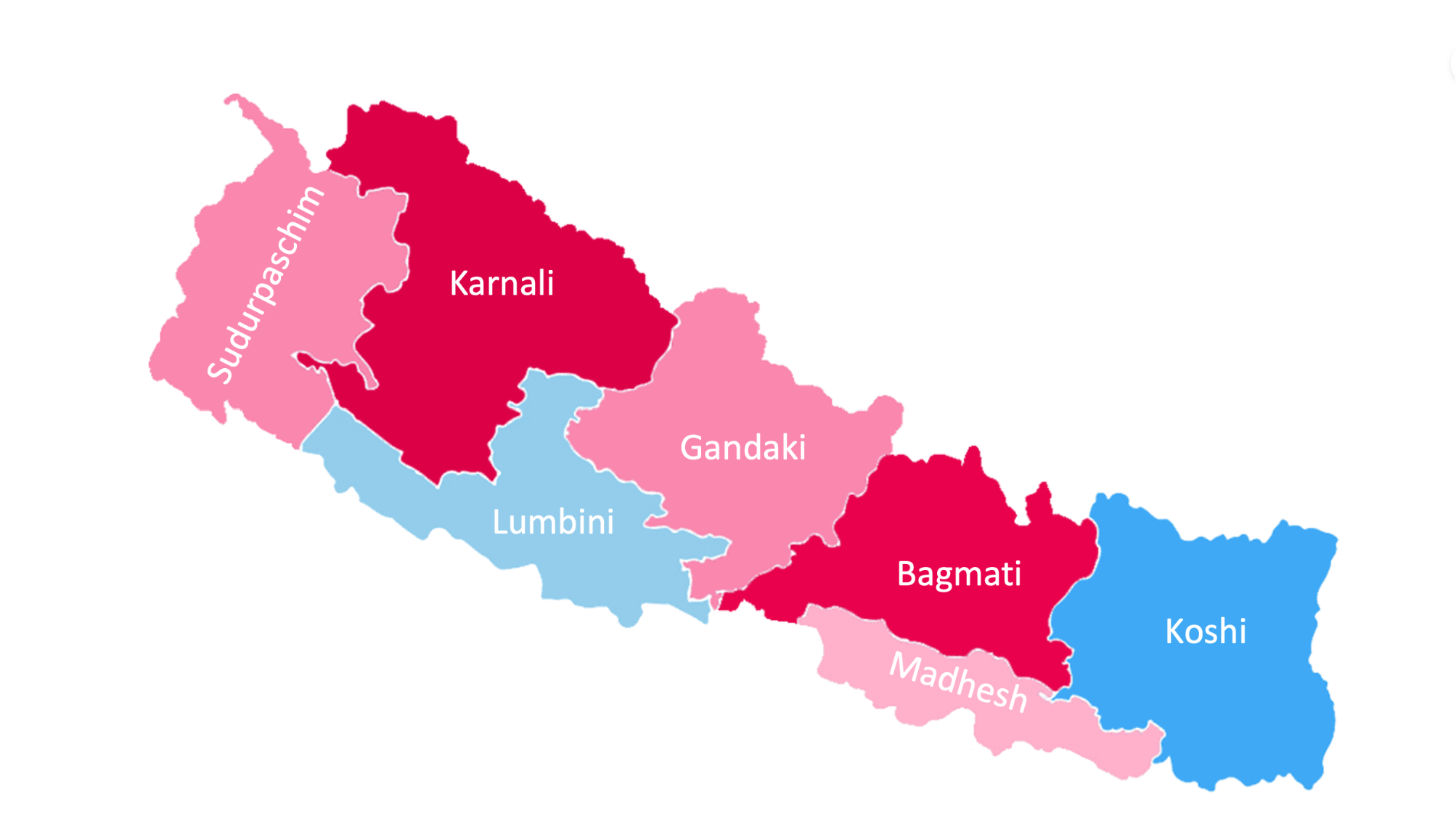
A map of Nepal showing its seven constituent provinces

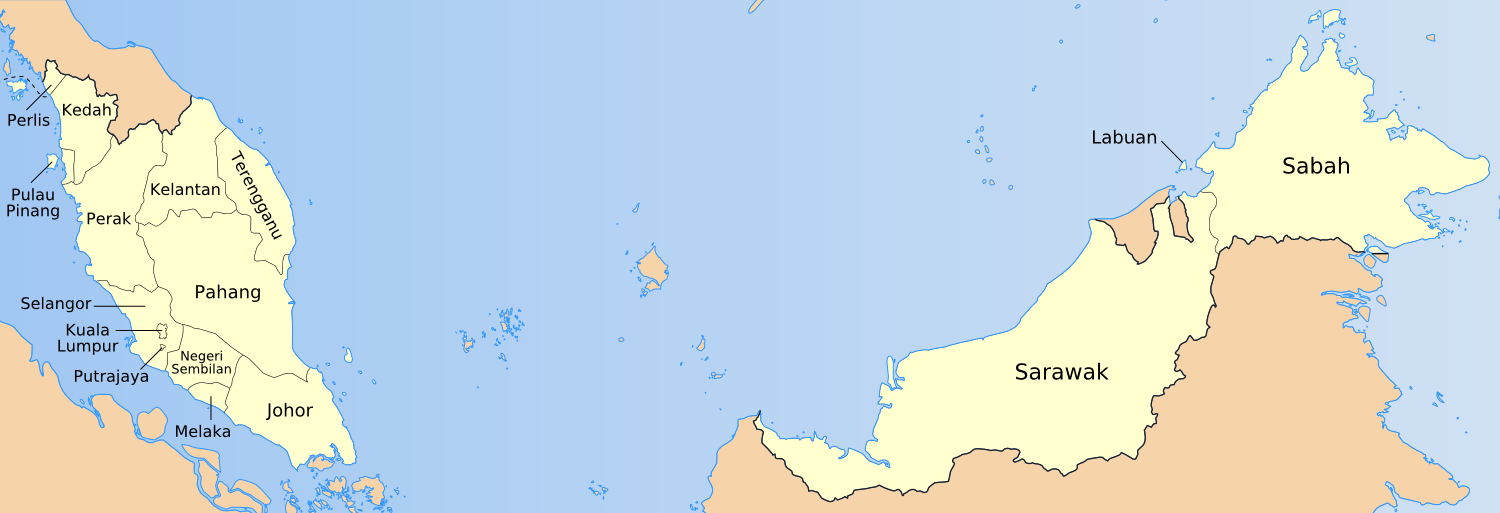
A map of Malaysia showing its thirteen states and three federal territories

=== Federations ===
The component states are in some sense sovereign, insofar as certain powers are reserved to them that may not be exercised by the central government. However, a federation is more than a mere loose alliance of independent states. The component states of a federation usually possess no powers in relation to foreign policy and so enjoy no independent status under international law. However, German Länder have that power, which is beginning to be exercised on a European level.

Some federations are called asymmetric because some states have more autonomy than others. An example of such a federation is Malaysia, in which Sarawak and Sabah agreed to form the federation on different terms and conditions from the states of Peninsular Malaysia.

A federation often emerges from an initial agreement between several separate states. The purpose can be the will to solve mutual problems and to provide for mutual defense or to create a nation-state for an ethnicity spread over several states. The former was the case with the United States and Switzerland. However, as the histories of countries and nations vary, the federalist system of a state can be quite different from these models. Australia, for instance, is unique in that it came into existence as a nation by the democratic vote of the citizens of each state, who voted "yes" in referendums to adopt the Australian Constitution. Brazil, on the other hand, has experienced both the federal and the unitary state during its history. Some present-day states of the Brazilian federation retain borders set during the Portuguese colonization (before the very existence of the Brazilian state), whereas the latest state, Tocantins, was created by the 1988 Constitution.

Federalism is especially common among very large democracies, but federations vary greatly in area and population; territorial size alone does not determine constitutional form.

=== Unitary states ===
A unitary state may include self-governing regions, but their powers are legally delegated by the central constitutional order and can in principle be altered or withdrawn unilaterally. In a federation, by contrast, the existence and powers of the constituent units are constitutionally entrenched. Political constraints may nevertheless make withdrawal of devolved autonomy difficult even where it remains legally possible.

=== Confederation ===
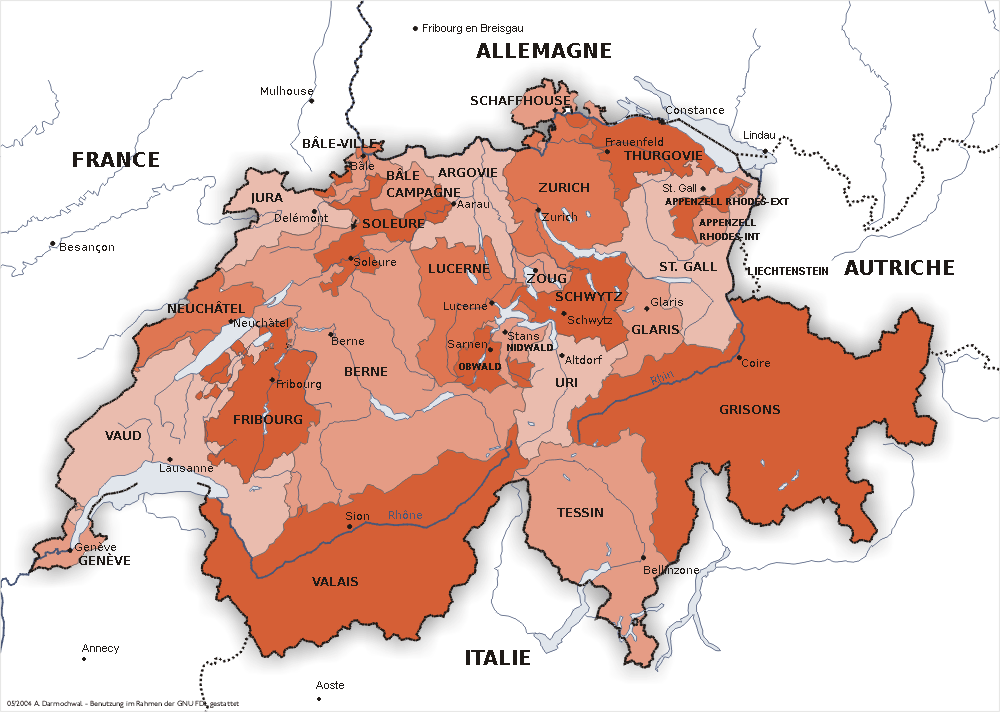
The Swiss Confederation and its 26 cantons

A confederation, in modern political terms, is usually limited to a permanent union of sovereign states for common action in relation to other states. The closest entity in the world to a confederation at this time is the European Union. While the word confederation was officially used when the Canadian federal system was established in 1867, the term refers only to the process and not the resulting state since Canadian provinces are not sovereign and do not claim to be. Switzerland retains the official name Swiss Confederation but has been a federal state since 1848.

Belgium evolved from a unitary state into a federal state through constitutional reforms beginning in 1970; Article 1 now defines it as a federal state composed of communities and regions. Proposals described as confederalism remain part of Belgian political and scholarly debate.

Compared with a federation, confederal institutions are subordinate to the member states, tend to exercise fewer powers directly over individuals, and commonly depend on member-state implementation or heightened consent for major decisions.

Over time these terms acquired distinct connotations leading to the present difference in definition. An example of this is the United States under the Articles of Confederation. The Articles established a national government under what today would be defined as a confederal system, with a comparatively weak central government. However, Canadians, whose government was designed with a stronger central government than the US in the wake of the US Civil War, use the term "Confederation" to refer to the formation or joining, not the structure, of Canada. Legal reforms, court rulings, and political compromises have decentralized Canada in practice since its formation in 1867.

=== Empire ===
An empire traditionally denotes a territorial realm governed under an imperial sovereign, but empires have varied greatly in the degree to which authority was centralized. Imperial and federal categories are not mutually exclusive: the Constitution of the German Empire (1871–1918), for example, established an enduring federation of member states and combined federal, monarchical and representative institutions.

=== Comparison with other systems of autonomy ===
==== Federacy ====
A federacy is a unitary state that incorporates one or more self-governing autonomous areas. It is distinguished from a federation in that the constitutional structure of the state is still unitary, but incorporates federalist principles. Åland's autonomy was established by Finnish legislation in 1920 and reinforced by a 1921 League of Nations settlement. Other examples sometimes classified as federacies include South Tyrol (the Autonomous Province of Bolzano/Bozen) in Italy, whose extensive and constitutionally protected autonomy has been compared with that of Åland.

==== Devolution ====
A federation differs from a devolved state, such as Indonesia and the United Kingdom, because, in a devolved state, the central government can alter the powers and autonomy of the subunits without changing the constitution. In the United Kingdom, these include the Scottish Parliament, the Welsh Parliament and the Northern Ireland Assembly. Although the UK Parliament retains parliamentary sovereignty and therefore ultimate legislative authority, the status of the devolved institutions is subject to important constitutional and political constraints. For example, the Scotland Act 2016 declares the Scottish Parliament and Scottish Government permanent parts of the United Kingdom's constitutional arrangements and provides that they are not to be abolished except following a referendum in Scotland. In some cases, such as the autonomous communities of Spain, devolution has led to federation in all but name, or "federation without federalism".

==== Crown dependencies ====
The relation between the Crown Dependencies of the Isle of Man and the bailiwicks of Guernsey and Jersey in the Channel Islands and the United Kingdom is very similar to a federate relation: the islands enjoy extensive internal self-government, and the United Kingdom, via the Crown, takes care of their foreign relations and defense – although the UK Parliament does have overall power to legislate for the dependencies. However, the islands are neither an incorporated part of the United Kingdom nor are they considered to be independent or associated states. The islands do not have a monarch, per se; rather in the Isle of Man the British Monarch is, ex officio, Lord of Mann, and in the Bailiwicks of Guernsey and Jersey, the British Monarch rules as the Duke of Normandy.

==== Dependent territories ====
The British overseas territories have differing degrees of internal self-government. The United Kingdom retains constitutional responsibilities, including security and obligations under international law, while territorial governments exercise powers allocated by their respective constitutions.

=== De facto federations ===
The distinction between a federation and a unitary state is often quite ambiguous. A unitary state may closely resemble a federation in structure and, while a central government may possess the theoretical right to revoke the autonomy of a self-governing region, it may be politically difficult for it to do so in practice. The self-governing regions of some unitary states also often enjoy greater autonomy than those of some federations. For these reasons, it is sometimes argued that some modern unitary states are de facto federations.

De facto federations, or quasi-federations, are often termed "regional states".

==== Spain ====
The Autonomous communities of Spain

Spain is suggested as one possible de facto federation as it grants more self-government to its autonomous communities than are retained by the constituent entities of most federations. For the Spanish parliament to revoke the autonomy of regions such as Galicia, Catalonia or the Basque Country would be a political near-impossibility, though nothing bars it legally. The Spanish parliament has, however, suspended the autonomy of Catalonia in response to the Catalan declaration of independence, in the lead-up to the 2017 Catalan election. Additionally, some autonomies such as Navarre or the Basque Country have extensive control over taxation and spending, transferring a payment to the central government for the common services (military, foreign relations, macroeconomic policy). For example, scholar Enrique Guillén López discusses the "federal nature of Spain's government (a trend that almost no one denies)." Each autonomous community is governed by a Statute of Autonomy (Estatuto de Autonomía) under the Spanish Constitution of 1978.

==== South Africa ====
Provinces of South Africa

The 1996 Constitution of South Africa establishes national, provincial and local spheres of government that are "distinctive, interdependent and interrelated" and gives provincial legislatures constitutionally defined powers. On the other hand, if federation is defined as the constitutional entrenchment of the powers of subcentral units (provinces, etc.) that is not unilaterally changeable or revocable by the central authority, South Africa does qualify, formally, as a federal state. Scholars nevertheless use varying descriptions, including federal and multi-sphere governance, and emphasize the comparatively strong role of national institutions.

==== European Union ====
The European Union (EU) is a sui generis supranational union of sovereign member states. Its constitutional character has no universally accepted classification. Scholars have variously analysed the EU using theories of federalism, characterised it as a federation or federal union of states, or argued that its legal order remains fundamentally international rather than federal. It is therefore commonly described as a sui generis political and legal union.

Under the principle of conferral, the EU may act only within the limits of the competences conferred on it by its member states through the EU treaties. Competences not conferred on the Union remain with the member states, while the exercise of non-exclusive EU competences is governed by the principles of subsidiarity and proportionality. The Union has its own legal personality. According to the case law of the Court of Justice of the European Union, provisions of EU law may have direct effect, and EU law has primacy over conflicting national law within its field of application.

The Treaty of Lisbon, which entered into force on 1 December 2009, ended the former three-pillar structure. The treaties instead distinguish between exclusive, shared and supporting competences, alongside arrangements for coordinating national economic and employment policies and special provisions governing the Common Foreign and Security Policy. The EU consequently exercises substantial authority in areas including the customs union, common commercial policy, the internal market, agriculture, environmental policy and the area of freedom, security and justice, although the extent and form of its authority vary between policy fields.

The Council of the European Union uses qualified majority voting for approximately 80 per cent of its legislative work, generally where legislation is adopted jointly with the European Parliament under the ordinary legislative procedure. Unanimity remains required in a number of sensitive areas, including most decisions under the Common Foreign and Security Policy, EU enlargement, the Union's own resources, the harmonisation of indirect taxation and certain measures concerning justice and home affairs or social protection. The EU therefore combines supranational decision-making, under which common institutions may adopt binding legal acts without the unanimous approval of every member state, with intergovernmental procedures in which national governments retain a veto.

These characteristics give the EU powers not normally associated with a traditional confederation, particularly because its legal acts can bind member states and, in some circumstances, individuals directly. The EU nevertheless differs from a sovereign federal state. Its competences derive from treaties concluded by the member states, and amendments made through the ordinary treaty-revision procedure enter into force only after ratification by every member state in accordance with its constitutional requirements. Article 50 of the Treaty on European Union also permits any member state to decide to withdraw from the Union in accordance with its own constitutional requirements.

In its 2009 judgment concerning the Treaty of Lisbon, the German Federal Constitutional Court described the EU as a Staatenverbund, translated by the court as an “association of sovereign states”: a permanent organisation of states that exercises public authority on the basis of treaties while its underlying constitutional order remains dependent on the member states. In German constitutional terminology, this classification is distinct from both a Staatenbund—a confederation of states—and a Bundesstaat, or federal state. Terms such as “federal-like system”, “quasi-federation”, “federal union” and “federation sui generis” are therefore used in the scholarly literature depending on the definition of federalism being applied.

==== People's Republic of China ====
Constitutionally, the power vested in the special administrative regions of the People's Republic is granted from the Central People's Government, through a decision by the National People's Congress. However, there have been certain largely informal grants of power to the provinces, to handle economic affairs and implement national policies, resulting in a system some have termed "federalism with Chinese characteristics".

==== Wallis and Futuna ====
Wallis and Futuna has an unusual territorial structure in which three administrative districts correspond to the traditional kingdoms of Uvea, Alo and Sigave; each district has legal personality and a council chaired by its customary king. French law also preserves personal customary status and guarantees respect for local customs insofar as they are compatible with general principles of law.

=== Asymmetric federalism ===
‘’‘Asymmetric federalism’’’ describes arrangements in which constituent units or regions do not all exercise the same degree of autonomy. In some countries, particular territories receive additional legislative, administrative or fiscal powers because of historical, linguistic, cultural, geographical or other circumstances. In a strict federation, the asymmetry normally exists between constituent states within a federal constitutional structure; similar arrangements can also occur in unitary states that constitutionally recognize differentiated regional autonomy.

==== Italy ====
Map of Italy showing its regions. Five regions have special autonomous status.

Italy provides an example of differentiated or asymmetric regional autonomy, although it is constitutionally a unitary state rather than a federation. The Italian Constitution establishes twenty regions, of which five have a special status of autonomy: Aosta Valley, Friuli-Venezia Giulia, Sardinia, Sicily, and Trentino-Alto Adige/Südtirol. Article 116 of the Constitution provides that these five regions have ‘‘particular forms and conditions of autonomy’’ under special statutes adopted by constitutional law."Constitution of the Italian Republic, Article 116". Senate of the Italian Republic.

The five special-statute regions have powers that differ from those of Italy’s ordinary-statute regions. The extent and precise character of their legislative, administrative and financial autonomy varies between the territories. The arrangement shows, among other factors, linguistic minorities, distinctive historical circumstances, geographical isolation and the particular political settlements associated with the incorporation of some territories into the Italian Republic."Constitution of the Italian Republic" (PDF). Senate of the Italian Republic.

Some examples in this system are Trentino-Alto Adige/Südtirol. Article 116 expressly provides that the region consists of the two autonomous provinces of Trento and Bolzano (German: Bozen). Consequently, a substantial part of the region’s autonomous powers is exercised at provincial rather than regional level."Constitution of the Italian Republic, Article 116". Senate of the Italian Republic.

Bolzano/Bozen, the capital of the Autonomous Province of Bolzano–South Tyrol, has also linguistic protection at this arrangement. South Tyrol has a large German-speaking population alongside Italian- and Ladin-speaking communities, and its autonomous institutions provide extensive territorial self-government within the Italian constitutional system.

The asymmetry also extends into some areas of public administration. In the five special-statute regions, forest administration and forest-police functions have historically been organized differently from those in the ordinary-statute regions. The regionalization of forest functions in the 1970s left the special-statute regions and the autonomous provinces with their own regional or provincial forest corps, exercising functions under their respective special arrangements."Il Corpo forestale dello Stato e la regionalizzazione". Arma dei Carabinieri.

This is also distinguished from the Carabinieri and Polizia di Stato, which are national Italian law-enforcement institutions. The Corpo forestale dello Stato was a national forest police force, but was absorbed into the Carabinieri in 2017; the special-statute regions and the autonomous provinces retained their own regional or provincial forest-police structures under their respective autonomous powers."Il Corpo Forestale dello Stato dalle origini alla unificazione con l'Arma dei Carabinieri: due secoli di storia". Arma dei Carabinieri.

== Internal controversy and conflict ==
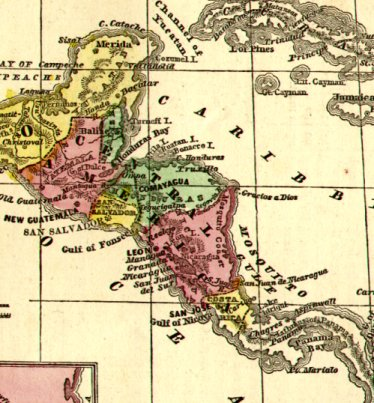
The United Provinces of Central America was a short-lived federal republic.

Disputes over the boundary between central and constituent-unit powers are common in federations. Federal constitutions typically designate a court or another institution to arbitrate jurisdictional disputes, while intergovernmental bodies and procedures manage responsibilities that overlap in practice.

Federal systems also vary in whether constituent units are socially congruent with the country as a whole or instead coincide with distinct linguistic, ethnic, religious or regional communities; the latter arrangement is commonly described as incongruent federalism.

The ability of a federal government to create national institutions that can mediate differences that arise because of linguistic, ethnic, religious, or other regional differences is an important challenge. The inability to meet this challenge may lead to the secession of parts of a federation or to civil war, as occurred in the United States (southern states sought to protect the institution of slavery while northern states opposed it, with a catalysis occurring in the then–Kansas Territory), in Nigeria and in Switzerland. In the case of Malaysia, Singapore was expelled from the federation because of rising racial tension. In some cases, internal conflict may lead a federation to collapse entirely, as occurred the Federation of Rhodesia and Nyasaland, the Gran Colombia, the United Provinces of Central America, and the West Indies Federation.

Federalism can help accommodate territorial diversity, but it does not eliminate secessionist conflict or guarantee political stability. Comparative studies identify both durable federal accommodation and failed or contested federal arrangements, as well as the use of federalism in post-conflict reconstruction.

== Federal governments ==
A federal government is the common government for the federation as a whole. Federal systems ordinarily contain at least two constitutionally recognized orders of government, each acting directly on citizens within its assigned fields.

Powers commonly assigned to the federal level include defence, foreign affairs, currency and interregional or international commerce, although the precise allocation varies among federations.

Federal institutions may include an executive, legislature, ministries, administrative agencies and courts. Many federations also provide constituent units with representation in an upper chamber or another central body.

=== Contemporary ===
The table below lists 26 current federations, with 5 in Africa, 6 each in Asia and Europe, 4 in North America, 3 in South America and 2 in Oceania.

Current federations
Year est.	Country	Type (Note: R = Federal republic; M = Monarchy)	Structure	Top-level subdivisions (federated and other)	Major federated units	Minor units (Note: That is, first-level subdivisions possessing less autonomy than the major federated units.) (federated or other)
1853	Argentine Republic	R	Presidential	Provinces of Argentina	23 provinces	1 autonomous city
1901	Commonwealth of Australia	M	Parliamentary	States and territories of Australia	6 states	3 internal territories (two of which are self-governing) and 7 external territories
1920	Republic of Austria	R	Parliamentary (Note: De facto; de jure a semi-presidential republic.)	States of Austria	9 states (Länder or Bundesländer) incl. the city-state of Vienna	
1993	Kingdom of Belgium	M	Parliamentary	Divisions of Belgium	3 communities, 3 regions	3 communitarian commissions
1995	Bosnia and Herzegovina	R	Parliamentary	Divisions of Bosnia and Herzegovina	2 entities, one of which is itself a federation of 10 cantons	1 district (Note: Brčko District is de jure part of both entities, and de facto administered separately from either.)
1889	Federative Republic of Brazil	R	Presidential	Federative units of Brazil	27 federative units (one is a federal district and the others are states) (Note: 20 provinces during the Empire of Brazil 1822–89)	5,569 municipalities
1867	Canada	M	Parliamentary	Provinces and territories of Canada	10 provinces	3 territories
1995	Federal Democratic Republic of Ethiopia	R	Parliamentary	Regions and chartered cities of Ethiopia	12 regions	2 chartered cities
1949	Federal Republic of Germany	R	Parliamentary	States of Germany	16 states (Länder or Bundesländer) incl. the city-states of Berlin, Hamburg, and Bremen	
1947 (Note: As an independent Dominion; republic declared in 1950)	Republic of India	R	Parliamentary	States and union territories of India	28 states	8 union territories, including a national capital territory
2005	Republic of Iraq	R	Parliamentary	Governorates of Iraq	19 provinces (governorates), of which four form the Kurdistan Region	
1963	Malaysia	M	Parliamentary	States of Malaysia	13 states	3 federal territories
1824	United Mexican States	R	Presidential	States of Mexico	31 states and Mexico City	
1979	Federated States of Micronesia	R	Presidential	Administrative divisions of Micronesia	4 states	
2015	Nepal	R	Parliamentary	Provinces of Nepal	7 provinces	
1960 (Note: As the Federation of Nigeria; republic declared in 1963)	Federal Republic of Nigeria	R	Presidential	Subdivisions of Nigeria	36 states	1 federal capital territory
1947 (Note: As an independent Dominion; republic declared in 1956)	Islamic Republic of Pakistan	R	Parliamentary	Provinces and territories of Pakistan	4 provinces	2 autonomous territories and 1 federal capital territory
1992 (Note: After the dissolution of the Soviet Union, a new Treaty of Federation was signed in 1992, which did not include all of the same components as the Soviet Union.)	Russian Federation	R	Semi-presidential	Federal subjects of Russia	Russia claims 89 federal subjects; 83 are within Russia's internationally recognized borders.	
1983	Federation of Saint Christopher and Nevis	M	Parliamentary	The islands Saint Kitts and Nevis	1 federal unit (the island of Nevis)	The island of Saint Kitts (directly administered by the federal government)
2012	Federal Republic of Somalia	R	Parliamentary	Federal Member States of Somalia	7 states	
2011	Republic of South Sudan	R	Presidential	States of South Sudan	10 states	3 administrative areas (one of which has a special administrative status)
1956	Republic of the Sudan	R	Military junta	States of Sudan	18 states	
1848	Swiss Confederation	R	Directorial	Cantons of Switzerland	26 cantons (Note: Three pairs of cantons have less power at federal level than the other 20 cantons, but the same degree of internal autonomy.)	
1971	United Arab Emirates	M	Semi-constitutional monarchy	Emirates of the UAE	7 emirates	
1776 (Note: The United States Constitution, which replaced the Articles of Confederation and Perpetual Union, was drafted in 1787 and was ratified in 1788. The first Congress and President did not take office until March 1789.)	United States of America	R	Presidential	US states and territories	50 states	1 federal district; 16 territories (Note: Of the 5 territories that are permanently inhabited, all are unincorporated, two are commonwealths and a third is formally unorganized. Of the other 11, one is incorporated and all are unorganized; together they form the United States Minor Outlying Islands. The term insular area includes both territories and places with a Compact of Free Association.)
1864	Bolivarian Republic of Venezuela	R	Presidential	States of Venezuela	23 states	1 federal district, 1 federal dependency

=== Defunct ===
- Confederation of Madja-as (1200–1569)
- Haudenosaunee (Iroquois Confederation) (15th/16th century-1799)
- Polish–Lithuanian Commonwealth (1569–1795)
- Confederate Ireland (1642–1652)
- Hawaiian Kingdom (1795–1827)
- United Kingdom of Portugal, Brazil and the Algarves (1815–1825)
- Hispaniola (1822–1844)
- (Federal Republic of Central America) United Provinces of Central America (1823 – c. 1838)
- Peru–Bolivian Confederation (1836–1839)
- (Granadine Confederation) Confederation of New Granada (1858–1863)
- Confederate States of America (1861–1865)
- United States of Colombia (1863–1886)
- North German Confederation (1867–1871)
- Austria-Hungary (1867–1918)
- German Empire (1871–1918)
- Federal Republic of Spain (1873–1874)
- French Indochina (1887–1949)
- Federated Malay States (1896–1946)
- French West Africa (1895–1958)
- French Equatorial Africa (1910–1934 and 1937–1958)
- Transcaucasian Democratic Federative Republic (1918)
- Union of Soviet Socialist Republics (1922–1991)
- Weimar Republic (1919–1933)
- Syrian Federation (1922–1925)
- Federal State of Austria (1934–1938)
- Mengjiang Autonomous United Government (1937–1945, since 1941 autonomous region of the Reorganized National Government of China)
- Socialist Federal Republic of Yugoslavia (1945–1992)
- (Federated Malay States) Malayan Union (1946–1948)
- Federation of Malaya (1948–1963)
- United States of Indonesia (1949–1950)
- United Kingdom of Libya (1951–1963)
- Federation of Ethiopia and Eritrea (1952–1962)
- Federation of Rhodesia and Nyasaland (1953–1963)
- West Indies Federation (1958–1962)
- Mali Federation (1959–1960)
- First Congolese Republic (Léopoldville) (1960–1964)
- Federal Republic of Cameroon (1961–1972)
- Republic of Uganda (1962–1967)
- Republic of Kenya (1963–1964)
- United Republic of Tanzania (1964–1965)
- Czechoslovak Socialist Republic (1969–1992)
- Federal Republic of Yugoslavia (1992–2003)

Some of the proclaimed Arab federations were confederations de facto.

== See also ==
- Anti-Federalism – 1780s political movement in the US
- Canadian Confederation – 1867 unification of British provinces
- Centre for Studies on Federalism – Turin university established 2000
- Commonwealth of Nations – Political association which developed from the British Empire
- Corporative federalism – Federalism based on members' legal personhood
- Constitutional economics – Research program in economics and constitutionalism
- Federalism in Australia
- Federalism in Canada – Federal systems of Canada
- Federalist – Set of political beliefs
- The Federalist Papers – 1788 essay collection by Alexander Hamilton, James Madison, and John Jay
- Federation of Australia – Process of Australian unification
- Foederati – Peoples and cities bound by a treaty, typically with ancient Rome
- Forum of Federations
- Independent city#Federal capitals – Type of city or town
- International organisation – Organization established by treaty between governments
- Międzymorze (Intermarium) – Proposed country during World War I
- Multinational state – State comprising multiple nations
- Neo-functionalism – Political theory
- New federalism – Transfer of certain powers from the United States federal government back to the states
- Non-governmental federation – Federations which are not states or national governments
- Rule according to higher law – Belief that universal principles of morality override unjust laws
- Supranationalism – Multinational political union with a central authority
- Supranational union – Multinational political union with a central authority
- World Federalist Movement – Political idea of a global federal government
