= Gauweiler and Others v Deutscher Bundestag =

Eurozone related law case

- Court: CJEU
- Decided: 16 June 2015
- Citation: (2015) C-62/14

Keywords
- Monetary policy, Outright Monetary Transactions

Gauweiler and Others v Deutscher Bundestag (2015) C-62/14 is an EU law case relevant for banking law which approved outright monetary transactions that were needed to save the Eurozone from financial turmoil.

== Facts ==
On January 14 2014, the German Federal Constitutional Court (German: Bundesverfassungsgericht; GFCC) made its first preliminary reference to the European Court of Justice. The reference pointedly challenged the Outright Monetary Transactions (OMT) program, an initiative by the European Central Bank (ECB) to bolster economic stability by purchasing Eurozone government bonds on secondary markets.

Although the OMT had not been implemented to date, its technical features were announced via press release on September 6 2012. The ECB said it would buy bonds on the secondary markets issued by states if (1) the state became subject to the European Financial Stability Facility assistance programme and the European Stability Mechanism (2) transactions focused on the shorter part of the yield curve (3) no quantitative limits were set in advance (4) the ECB got the same treatment as private creditors (5) the ECB undertook that liquidity created would be fully sterilised.

Following a challenge raised by conservative German politician Peter Gauweiler, the GFCC objected to the OMT on two grounds. Firstly, it indicated that the OMT likely violated Articles 199 and 127 of the Treaty on the Functioning of the European Union (TFEU), as well as Articles 17 to 24 of the Protocol on the Statute of the European System of Central Banks, by exceeding the ECB’s monetary policy mandate and interfering with economic policy. Secondly, the GFCC inquired whether the OMT violated TFEU Article 123, which prohibited monetary financing for member states.

Because German Basic Law (German: Grundgesetz) enshrines the unamendable principle of democracy, Germany cannot constitutionally comply with any EU program that is not democratically legitimized by strict adherence to the limits of its treaties. Consequently, the GFCC would be compelled to unilaterally declare the OMT ultra vires if its objections were not addressed.

AG Cruz Villalon gave an opinion in favour of the EU policy.

== Judgment ==
The Grand Chamber of the CJEU held that the European Central Bank could adopt a programme to buy government bonds on the secondary markets under TFEU articles 119, 123, 127 and articles 17 to 24 of Protocol (No 4) on the Statute of the European System of Central Banks and of the European Central Bank. The outright monetary transaction programme was monetary policy, and measures taken were proportionate to the objectives without contravening TFEU art 123.

102 It follows that, as the Advocate General has observed in point 227 of his Opinion, when the ECB purchases government bonds on secondary markets, sufficient safeguards must be built into its intervention to ensure that the latter does not fall foul of the prohibition of monetary financing in Article 123(1) TFEU.

103 As regards a programme such as that announced in the press release, it must in the first place be stated that, in the framework of such a programme, the ESCB is entitled to purchase government bonds — not directly, from public authorities or bodies of the Member States — but only indirectly, on secondary markets. Intervention by the ESCB of the kind provided for by a programme such as that at issue in the main proceedings thus cannot be treated as equivalent to a measure granting financial assistance to a Member State.

104 That said, the point should be made, in the second place, that the ESCB’s intervention could, in practice, have an effect equivalent to that of a direct purchase of government bonds from public authorities and bodies of the Member States if the potential purchasers of government bonds on the primary market knew for certain that the ESCB was going to purchase those bonds within a certain period and under conditions allowing those market operators to act, de facto, as intermediaries for the ESCB for the direct purchase of those bonds from the public authorities and bodies of the Member State concerned.

105 However, the explanations provided by the ECB in these proceedings have made clear that the implementation of a programme such as that announced in the press release must be subject to conditions intended to ensure that the ESCB’s intervention on secondary markets does not have an effect equivalent to that of a direct purchase of government bonds on the primary market.

== Aftermath ==
Following the ECJ’s opinion, contemporary commentators worried that the German Constitutional Court would challenge its primacy. Nevertheless, the GFCC accepted the ECJ’s verdict, acknowledging that the Court of Justice conducted the requisite proportionality analysis and “set binding limits for any implementation of the OMT programme.” Although the ECJ had not explicitly specified any legally binding limiting conditions, the GFCC extrapolated several criteria that the OMT would be required to observe in order to retain legitimacy:

- The volume of the purchases must be limited from the outset
- There must be a minimum, predetermined period between the issuance of the government bonds and their purchase by the ESCB
- The ESCB must only purchase government bonds of Member States that have bond market access enabling the funding of such bonds
- Purchased bonds must only be held until maturity in exceptional cases
- Purchases must be restricted or ceased and purchased bonds remarketed once continued intervention becomes unnecessary

The GFCC’s deference ceased in 2020 however with the Weiss and others case. This case saw a similar Basic Law challenge mounted against the ECB’s Public Sector Asset Purchase Program, which coordinated purchases of member states’ debt securities on secondary markets. The GFCC found the ECJ’s response to its preliminary reference inadequate, arguing that it failed to consider “the importance and scope of the principle of proportionality,” which had justified restraint in Gauweiler. The GFCC further asserted that the ECJ did not consider the “actual effects” of the PSPP on economic policy, nor did it adequately enforce the aforementioned standards.

== See also ==
- United Kingdom enterprise law
- Primacy of European Union law
- Solange I
- Solange II
