= National Identity Clause =

Principle of the Treaty on European Union

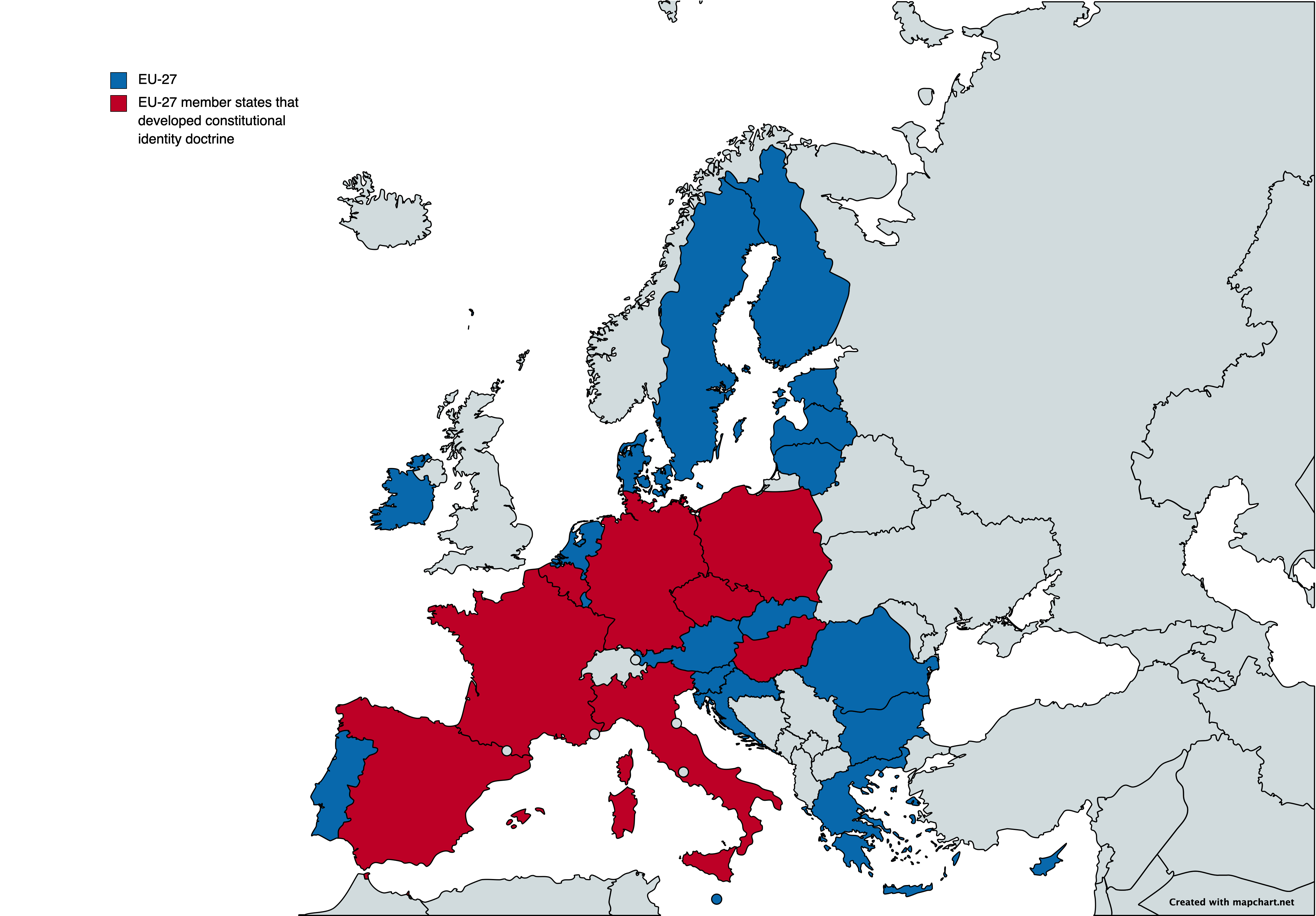
EU-27 map indicating member states that had developed constitutional identity doctrine

National Identity Clause is a legal principle enshrined in article 4(2) of the Treaty on European Union. Its original purpose can be linked to the protection of cultural identity, apparently threatened by the free movement of services and goods in the cultural domain. It was supposed to prevent EU competence creep in the areas belonging to complementary competencies. Today it is most typically associated with limits to European integration and protection of core competences of the nation states within the EU.

The issue of national identity protection and article 4(2) TEU are highly contentious and debated both in legal scholarship, judicial practice, and political discourse. The most salient cleavages run across themes like: content and scope, implication for the principle of primacy of EU law and, since the second half of the 2010s - its potential to be abused in the context of the rule of law crisis.

== Origins ==
The national identity clause first occurred in the Treaty of Maastricht in article F which stated that: “The Union shall respect; the national identities of its Member States, whose systems of government are founded on the principles of democracy”. It was slightly expanded in the Treaty of Amsterdam, in article 6. Many analysts agree that the inclusion of this clause was linked to the balance of power and skepticism that Treaty of Maastricht would eventually lead to the creation of the European Super-State. The inclusion of article F was supposed to guarantee that crucial state competences will remain intact. Initially, the national identity clause did not enjoy substantial scholarly nor juridical attention, with some even claiming that it was nothing more than a political statement.

Despite the wording that indicates respect of “national identity”, this clause is commonly understood as referring to a constitutional identity, a legal doctrine, rather than national identity stricto sensu, which is not a legal term. There is an extensive scholarship on constitutional identity in general, elaborating different meanings of this term. The situation is no different in the particular case of the European Union's legal order. There are numerous ways to interpret the national identity clause.

== Functions and content of the national identity clause ==
Scholarship and jurisprudence generally take similar positions regarding functions of the national identity clause.

A first prominent function is to apply constitutional identity in the context of the transfer of power from Nation State level to the European level. Understood in this way, Constitutional identity sets a limit to the degree of integration, and competences that can be transferred from the member state level to the EU level. This concept of constitutional identity was most famously elaborated by the German Constitutional Court in the Lisbon Judgement.

According to the German Constitutional Court, it would be impossible to transfer to the European Union competencies that make up this core, even if there would be a sufficient democratic majority to do it. In this sense constitutional identity constitutes an absolute limit to the degree of conferral.

Another common approach treats article 4(2) TEU as a principle permitting member states to exceptionally decide to disapply provision of EU law. Understood in this way, it is a mechanism complementing principles of subsidiarity and proportionality and should only be used as a measure of last resort. It could be applied in situations, when using all other mechanisms limiting the scope of EU law, failed to remove serious doubts regarding encroachment of constitutional identity by the particular provision of EU secondary law.

Thirdly, according to Guastaferro, the national identity clause can also be used to broaden member states capacity to justify national measures that constitute an obstacle to Single Market, therefore complementing and expanding the system of such justifications.

Whereas functions of the identity clause are rather agreed on, the question of its meaning and content is more contested. For some theorists like Bruno De Witte, article 4(2) TEU should only refer to narrowly understood institutional diversity, limiting the EU duty to respect to areas such as: regional/local self-government, organization of the judiciary, the choice between parliamentary or semi-presidential system, proportional or majoritarian electoral system etc. On the other end of the spectrum, there are notions of national identity clause that encompass a broad range of extra-legal factors. Some of the latter go as far as referring to Carl Schmitt's distinction between substantive constitution and constitutional acts, seeking to draw constitutional identity from the former.

== National identity clause in CJEU jurisprudence ==
In numerous rulings, the Court of Justice of the European Union has elucidated the national identity clause. However, this jurisprudence is often criticized, to the point where some scholars had questioned the utility of the clause. This is partly due to the fact that it was used in cases dealing with issues of minor constitutional importance, not fundamental ones.

=== Sayn-Wittgenstein ===
In the case C-208/09 - Sayn-Wittgenstein, the government of Austria successfully invoked arguments relating to Constitutional identity. The case concerned the intention to correct the applicant's file in the register of civil status by removing the noble title, following the judgment of Austrian Constitutional Court. The applicant claimed that such correction would violate her right to free movement, the right to provide services and the rights derived from art. 21 TEU (regarding Citizenship of the European Union). After balancing these conflicting claims, the ECJ decided that the Austrian constitutional principle of equality and its constitutional identity as a republic prevail over Sayn-Wittgenstein's claims based on EU law.

=== Runevič-Vardyn and Wardyn ===
In case C-391/09 Runevič-Vardyn and Wardyn the government of Lithuania successfully defended its laws regarding the spelling of names for the purpose of the civil status register and official documentation, in accordance with rules of the Lithuanian language. The applicant sought to change the spelling of her surname in Lithuanian birth certificate to “Runiewicz” and her marriage certificate to “Runiewicz-Wardyn” (a Polish spelling, in both cases). The case ultimately made it to the CJEU, which ruled that under Article 4(2) TEU the EU must protect national identity, which covers also protection of national language and in that particular case the national rules allowing the state to refuse applicant's request to change her name and surname spelling were compatible with article 21 TFEU. Protection of national language under Article 4(2) TEU was also recognized in case C-202/11 Las, albeit in that judgment, the CJEU overruled national measure, claiming it was not proportionate.

=== Digibet ===
In case C-156/13 Digibet, the CJEU found that the division of power in the federal type entities cannot be called into question and is protected under article 4(2). The case concerned the regulation of games of chance, where one of the German Länder introduced a more liberal legal framework. The applicant argued that the more restrictive framework in the remaining Länder is an undue obstacle to the freedom to provide services. The CJEU rejected this argument, invoking inter alia article 4(2).

== National identity clause in national constitutional courts jurisprudence ==
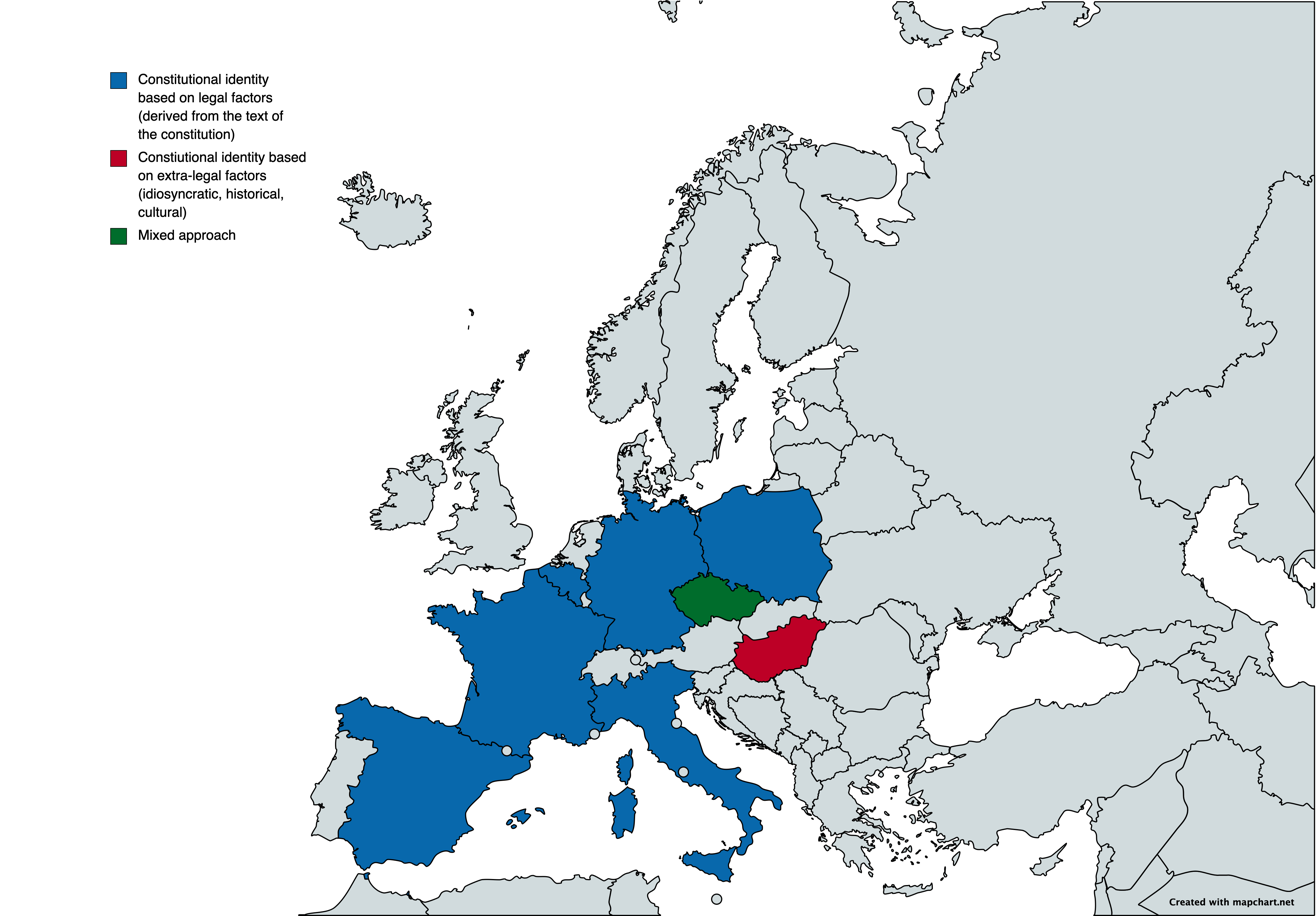
Nature of Constitutional Identity in various national jurisprudences

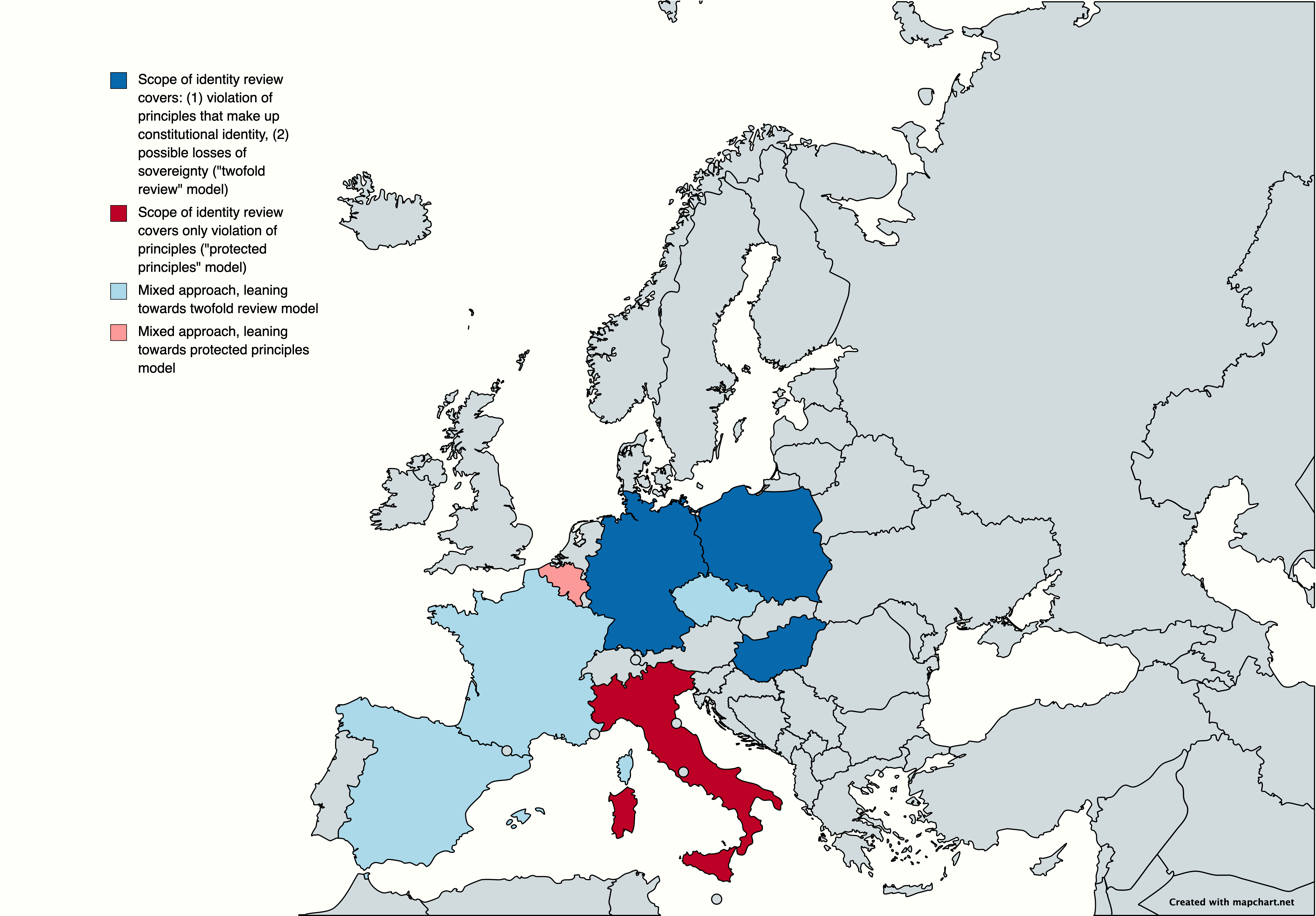
Scope of constitutional identity review in various national jurisprudence

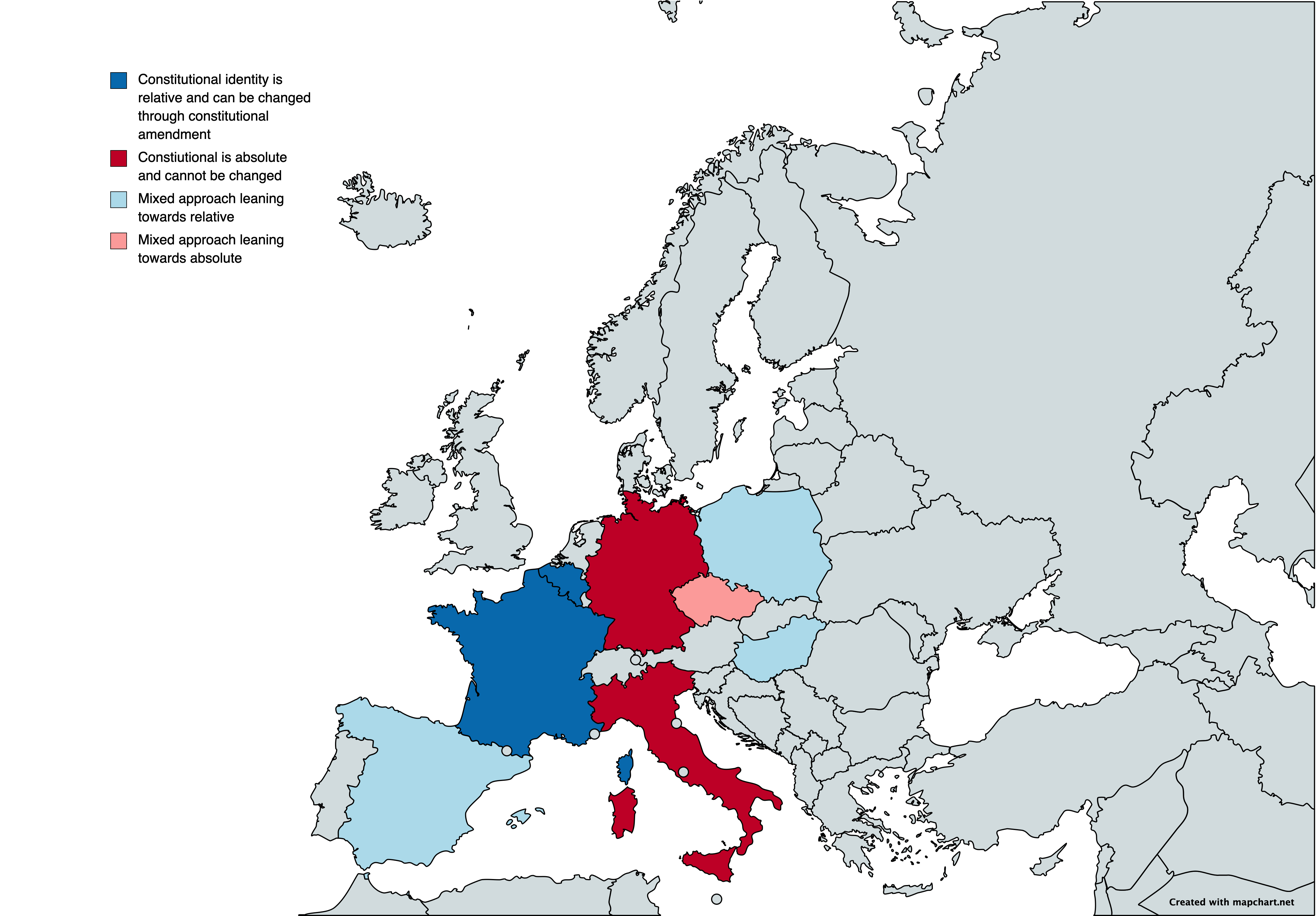
Scope of limitation derived from constitutional identity doctrine in various national jurisprudences

The national identity clause is much more prevalent among member states and was frequently invoked in judicial proceedings before the CJEU. Furthermore, several constitutional courts of the EU member states developed doctrine of constitutional identity in their jurisprudence. These national usages of identity clause are far from homogeneous. Early attempts of systemization were undertaken by Luke Dimitrios Spieker, who proposes to distinguish between soft and hard identity review. The “harder” the identity review, the more considerable potential for jurisdictional conflicts with the EU it generates.

=== Germany ===
German Constitutional Court is said to have developed the most elaborate doctrine of constitutional identity. In its famous Lisbon Judgement the court wrote:

“European unification on the basis of a treaty union of sovereign states may, however, not be achieved in such a way that not sufficient space is left to the Member States for the political formation of the economic, cultural and social living conditions. (…) Essential areas of democratic formative action comprise, inter alia, citizenship, the civil and the military monopoly on the use of force, revenue and expenditure including external financing and all elements of encroachment that are decisive for the realisation of fundamental rights, above all in major encroachments on fundamental rights such as deprivation of liberty in the administration of criminal law or placement in an institution. These important areas also include cultural issues such as the disposition of language, the shaping of circumstances concerning the family and education, the ordering of the freedom of opinion, press and of association and the dealing with the profession of faith or ideology.”

=== Italy ===
Italy was traditionally one of the most pro-European countries, which was also reflected in the jurisprudence of the Italian Constitutional Court. This assessment is made, even though the Italian Constitutional Court was one of the first to develop the doctrine limiting the powers of the EU (contro-limit). This attitude is changing to a more defensive one only recently, in the so-called “Taricco saga” (a series of judicial proceedings beginning with Taricco judgment of the CJEU). The dispute in Taricco concerned substantive criminal law, with the Italian Constitutional Court defending a higher standard than the one envisaged by EU law, by referring to common constitutional traditions. This first preliminary reference was positively received as an excellent example of constructive judicial dialogue. Rather than referring to the exclusionary notion of constitutional identity, it was particularly applauded for framing the conflict in the language of common constitutional traditions (a pro-European, cooperative notion). However this enthusiasm was short-lived, as in yet another judgement issued by the Italian Constitutional Court in 2018, it adopted a much more defensive approach vis á vis EU law, in what looks like Italian constitutional identity doctrine being born.

=== Central-Eastern Europe ===
Several Central European courts developed their doctrine of identity review. The German Constitutional Court strongly influenced their constitutional identity jurisprudence.

For example, in Polish Constitutional Court Lisbon Judgement, case K-32/09, we read: “The Constitutional Court shares the view expressed in the doctrine that the competences covered by the prohibition of transfer, constitute the constitutional identity, and thus reflect the values on which the Constitution is based. The constitutional identity is therefore a concept determining the scope of “exclusion from the competence to pass on matters belonging (...) to the ‘hard core’, cardinal for the basis of the political system of a given state” the transfer of which would not be possible on the basis of Article 90 of the Constitution.” The Court went on to explicitly mention German judgement: “In this context, it is worth mentioning the Federal Constitutional Court’s redefinition of its own role in the light of the Lisbon Treaty as guardian “constitutional identity”.

== Rule of law crisis and critique of national identity clause ==
In the context of the Rule of Law Crisis, article 4 (2) TEU and the doctrines of National/Constitutional Identity were invoked by the governments of Poland and Hungary to justify non-compliance with European Law. In 2016 Hungarian Constitutional Court used the doctrine of constitutional identity to oppose the EU relocation scheme during the EU migration crisis. According to Lech Morawski, a polish law professor and constitutional judge nominated by the Law and Justice party: ”the strictly liberal model is incompatible with the Polish tradition and constitutional identity. It should be strongly emphasized that Polish constitutionalism from the very beginning (…) has not been based on strictly liberal values, but on republican ones””. References to constitutional identity are also present in the recent polish constitutional judgments, delivered in the framework of legal disputes with the European Union. In judgment P-7/20, regarding the validity of an interim measure mandating the suspension of the Disciplinary Chamber of the Polish Supreme Court, the Polish Constitutional court wrote:” The interim measures ordered against the Republic of Poland on 8 April 2020, contrary to the first sentence of Article 4(2) TEU, clearly and substantially encroach upon the area of constitutional regulation, thus violating the Polish constitutional identity, of which the Polish judiciary is an immanent part. No authority may exempt Polish citizens, and in particular Polish judges, from the obligation to apply the Polish Constitution.”.

Scholarship sees these new ways of using constitutional identity as constituting a shift, move from legal and statist concepts towards more extra-legal and nationalistic. According to Corrias, populist understanding of constitutional identity is strongly linked to a notion of national identity, strongly connected to national myths and symbols, considered to pre-date particular constitution, unsusceptible to change and concentrated on the expression of the majority and its rights. This is confirmed by the judgement of the Hungarian Constitutional Court mentioned above, where the court stated that:” the constitutional self-identity of Hungary is a fundamental value not created by the Fundamental Law - it is merely acknowledged by the Fundamental Law””.

These uses of Constitutional Identity have led some scholars to criticize the doctrine itself, claiming that it is inherently flawed and prone to abuse. In the aftermath of the” Weiss” judgment of the German Constitutional Court, a group of leading scholars published a joint statement in which they challenge any version of constitutional pluralism or identity doctrines that facilitate the deprivation of the CJEU judgments of their binding force in any of the Member States, therefore defending the absolute primacy of the European Law. For Fabbrini and Sajó, constitutional identity is overly indeterminate when it comes to identifying its sources and content and prone to arbitrariness in application. The authors also claim that there is a shift in the interpretation of the clause, from legal-statist to cultural-nationalistic, and assess it negatively, from the point of view of European integration.
