= European Central Bank intervention in the eurozone crisis =

European Central Bank intervention in the eurozone crisis was conducted in 2009 to 2010, due to substantial public and private sector debt, and "the intimate sovereign-bank linkages" the eurozone crisis impacted the periphery countries in Europe. This resulted in significant financial sector instability in Europe; banks' solvency risks grew, which had direct implications for their funding liquidity.

The European central bank, as the monetary union's central bank, responded to the sovereign debt crisis with a series of conventional and unconventional measures, including a decrease in the key policy interest rate, and three-year long-term refinancing operation (LTRO) liquidity injections in December 2011 and February 2012, and the announcement of the outright monetary transactions (OMT) program in the summer of 2012. The ECB acted as a de facto lender-of-last-resort (LOLR) to the euro area banking system, providing banks with cash flow in exchange for collateral, as well as a buyer of last resort (BOLR) (For example, In the OMT), purchasing eurozone sovereign bonds. However, the ECB's policies have been criticised for their economic repercussions as well as its political agenda.

Despite a 2007-2009 intergovernmental bailout by central banks, financial regulators, and treasuries; and the implementation of austerity measures, the Greek government was forced to seek outside financial assistance. However, such aid did not occur quickly, as European leaders debated whether and how to assist the country. The newly elected Greek government admitted in late 2009 that the country's budget deficit was substantially higher than formerly claimed, and far more than the eurozone's stability and growth pact guidelines permitted. The euro crisis began when prominent rating agencies lowered Greece's credit ratings in December 2009, causing Greek bonds to significantly soar. The catastrophic consequences of the EMU sovereign debt crisis on the banking sector and overall economy, strongly urged the ECB to responsibly ensure financial stability, which led to sudden, unprecedented and controversial policies. The primary objective of those measures was to boost the liquidity of banks that were significantly impacted by large holdings of government bonds issued by EMU member states in crisis in their asset portfolios.

Effectively, the ECB used both traditional and nontraditional monetary policy tools and measures. The ECB lowered the key policy interest rate, in April 2010 from 1% to a remarkably low rate of 0.75% in July 2012, and reduced the minimum reserve requirements from 2% to 1% in December 2011. In addition, through its standard repurchase agreement auctions, the ECB provided additional liquidity to market players. Then, it increased the contract period of some repo transactions and implementing full allotment.

== The first phase of interventions ==
The ECB proceeded to make outright purchases, starting from 2009, supplying market participants with substantial funding. In June 2009, the first Covered Bond Purchase Program (CBPP) was in effect, when the transmission of policy rate adjustments to market rates appeared to be impaired, the ECB initially purchased the covered bonds. However, In the early stages of the sovereign debt crisis, the ECB opted to use further unconventional monetary policy measures. Open market operations, which included major refinancing operations MROs) and long-term refinancing operations, were launched LTROs). The European Central Bank ECB) used these loan products to lend money to Eurozone banks at extremely low interest rates.

On the 2nd of May 2010, the ECB announced that the governing council which is the main decision- making body of the ECB) decided to suspend minimum credit rating thresholds for Greek government debt used as collateral in Eurosystem refinancing operations. A week later, euro area leaders declared that all euro area institutions, including the ECB, had decided to revamp the European macroeconomic surveillance framework and to use the full range of instruments available to ensure the euro area's stability. Along with the establishment of the European financial stability facility EFSF), which had a total funding capacity of up to 500 billion euros. The ECB purchased government bonds alongside private debt under the securities market programme SMP). The purpose of SMP was to ensure that banks in the euro zone had enough liquidity and that monetary policy measures to achieve medium- term price stability could be implemented. However, the program was widely regarded as one of the most controversial sovereign bond purchases ever initiated by a central bank. The SMP was announced on Sunday, May 9, 2010, and launched one day later. Initial purchases mainly focus on Greek government bonds. The program's introduction came after a widening yield spreads throughout the eurozone's periphery causing the crisis to escalate. On May 10, 2010, the ECB started purchasing sovereign debt in the secondary financial markets. In December 2010, theEuropean council decided to set up a permanent crisis resolution mechanism for the countries of the eurozone, entitling it, the European stability mechanism ESM), which commenced operations in September 2012, and replaced temporary EU funding programs such as the EFSF.

Despite these efforts, the crisis worsened in the months that followed. Borrowing costs soared in the eurozone periphery, particularly in Ireland and Portugal, where massive credit growth turned into busts during the 2008 financial crisis. Following that, a memorandum of understanding — a conditionality signed by all governmental parties from the rest of the EU countries to ensure that the country seeking a loan would commit to structural and austerity reforms for years, even if governments changed — and a loan agreement covering the period 2011 to mid-2014 were signed, in order to extend maturities of EFSM loans to Ireland, Portugal, which included a joint EU-IMF financing package. Under the supervision of the troika, a tripartite body comprising the European commission, European central bank ECB), and international monetary fund IMF), both European states received bailouts – €85 billion for Ireland in November 2010 and €78 billion for Portugal in May 2011.

== The second phase of interventions ==
With bond spreads on Spanish and Italian government bonds set to increase, in order to reduce the borrowing costs, the ECB issued the resumption of its sovereign bond purchases. In November 2011, the European central bank launched the second instalment of its covered bond purchase programs CBPP2) to stimulate funding to credit institutions and facilitate lending. The program came to an end on 31 October 2012 after it fell well short of the €40 billion in purchases it aimed for. In June 2012, eurozone leaders embraced the commission's proposal of a banking union, in which eurozone banks would come under the single supervisory authority of European Banking Supervision. After tensions rose over the additional austerity measures stipulated in the agreement, extensive discussions were launched, in March 2012, Greece eventually received a second financial bailout package of €130 billionwith a second MoU. In the same year, Spain and later on, Cyprus joined the rest of credited countries to request and granted the financial assistance. Spain received up to €100 billion in financialassistance to recapitalise its banking industry. Cyprus requested assistance in the same month, which it received after lengthy discussions in March 2013. In July 2012, ECB president Mario Draghi assured markets that the ECB will do "everything it takes to maintain the euro" within the scope of its mandate.“Believe me, it will be enough”, he added, triggering a market rally. On September 6, 2012, the ECB calmed financial markets by announcing free unrestricted financial assistance for all eurozone countries involved in an EFSF/ESM sovereign state bailout/precautionary program. In September 2012, the ECB published details on its new bond-purchasing program, branded "outright monetary transactions (OMT)", which replaced the SMP.

== The third phase of interventions ==
Following these developments, the eurozone regained some sense of stability and cohesion, and the market stress eased. Countries began to withdraw from eurozone assistance programs (Ireland in December 2013, Spain in January 2014, Portugal in May 2014). Despite these improvements, the crisis resurfaced in January 2015, when Alexis Tsipras and the left-wing SYRIZA party were elected in Greece on the promise of ending austerity while remaining in the eurozone. Prolonged and tough discussions between Greece and the troika culminated in deadlock in the months that followed. With the liquidity issues worsening, expiration of Greece's bailout program approaching, and a take-it-or- leave-it offer from creditors on the table, Tsipras scheduled a referendum on the proposal, proposing that voters reject it in order to strengthen Greece's bargaining position. The ECB condemned Tsipras's actions, consequently, removing Greek bonds from its collateral framework, causing capital flight and pushing Greece to the brink of another crisis. Greece was told to close its banks and implement capital restrictions after becoming the first industrialised country to default on an IMF loan. A third loan was required by Greece. Following a euro-summit, Greece eventually accepted a third bailout deal with tougher terms than those rejected by the Greek people in the referendum. Nevertheless, in January 2015, the European central bank (ECB) decided to adopt and execute quantitative easing (QE) to battle deflationary forces and help the European economy recover. In June 2016, the ECB launched its corporate sector purchase programme to further expands asset purchases to corporate sector bonds.

== Controversies surrounding ECB's interventions ==
However, the ECB's strategy has been called into question. The central bank's measures and decisions have been criticised over the years. The ECB recurrently failed to completely offset the inflationary implications of its sovereign debt purchases, though it constructed its monetary policies with the assumption that its primary purpose was to achieve low inflation. Between October 2010 and May 2011, the ECB failed to adequately offset the inflationary effect of its debt purchases five times. The ECB's liquidity-boosting measures (CBPP1, CBPP2 and SMP), primarily the purchase of sovereign debt on secondary markets of eurozone member countries had inflationary impacts. Furthermore, it is argued that government bond yields did not stabilise despite longer-term refinancing operations (LTRO) liquidity injections despite the LTRO liquidity injections, government bond yields did not stabilise. In fact, the LTRO liquidity injections had little impact on those countries' sovereign risk. For example, after the second LTRO, between February and July 2012, average sovereign credit default swap spreads in Italy and Spain, increased by 48% on average.

It is also argued that the ECB took full advantage of the crisis to expand its political authority and further to isolate economic governance from election outcomes. Since the crisis, the ECB has become more autonomous, its powers have expanded from the initiative task in the monetary field (price stability) to almost coerced control over the economies of eurozone member states under the pretence of "protecting its independence," a two faces of that independence, "in order to show the roots of its market-friendly policy preferences". The ECB also exploited other factors, the lack of openness in decision-making procedures, the eurozone's support of market- friendly economic changes from its inception, and how it utilised its well-established reputation and "expertise" to portray the crisis as a fiscal one. The ECB has also been accused of favouring financial interests above its financial supervisory obligations. In addition, during the crisis, the ECB gradually expanded its influence into the political arena. The ECB was able to force its policy preferences on governments and financial institutions by becoming the LOLR (lender of last resort) for both the eurozone banking sector and the eurozone states' monetary support. The ECB was able to expand its influence by relying on the coercive channel (the QE program with Greece is one of the coercive tools it had used to highlight the ECB conditionality of its monetary interventions) and cognitive channel (influence in eurozone policy circles), and instead of shaping financial sector reforms it continued its process of financialization.

Furthermore, the ECB relied on two main tools to expand its influence and manipulate the reforms in certain countries:

== Bond purchasing programs ==
=== Formal conditionality ===
For the ECB to purchase bonds of a certain EU country, the country needs to activate the official help of the EU, meaning the country has to sign a memorandum of understanding and get loans from other EU countries and have troika expert groups sent to the country and then The ECB purchases the bond.

=== Informal conditionality ===
Sometimes before the country sign the MoU, the ECB were already purchasing the sovereign bonds of the country and were asking for continuity by sending letter to the prime minister detailing the reforms that this country should be taken for the ECB to purchase their bonds.

== Collateral framework ==
When the ECB provide liquidity to market operators it was always against a certain form of collateral. When the included bond its accepted in the ECB collateral framework its worth much more. The ECB is aware of the fact that, to include or not given sovereign debt and its collateral frame would change the value of that debt and that market operators would and it or not. For instance it was used to fight the private sector involvement option (2011–2012); In 2011 there was a unanimous agreement among all the member state to cancel part of their debt but the ECB fought against that, the ECB forced the EU countries to restructure their debts by not accepting those debt anymore in their collateral framework which will mean that the value of that sovereign debt would go down the fear that the ECB could do that made the EU countries to back away from the “cancelling part of their loansplan”. Another example is, to tame the new Greek government that was elected on anti-austerity basis (2015); the ECB stopped accepting Greek bonds in its collateral framework because the SYRIZA government was fighting against the austerity measures.
