= Stauder v City of Ulm =

- Court: European Court of Justice
- Citation: (1969) Case 29/69

Keywords
- fundamental rights human rights

Stauder v City of Ulm (1969) Case 29/69 is an EU law case, concerning the protection of fundamental rights in the European Union.

== Facts ==
The Decision No 69/71 ECC of the European Commission provided cheap butter for welfare benefits, but required to show a coupon with a person’s name and address. Mr Stauder was entitled to buy butter at reduced prices because he was beneficiary of the welfare scheme for those disabled in the war. However, he considered it illegal to make the appearance of the name of the beneficiary on the coupon mentioned above a condition for buying the butter. He claimed this violated his dignity and challenged it.

== Judgment ==
The Court of Justice held that properly interpreted, the measure did not require a name to be shown on the coupon. In doing so it acknowledged that human rights formed part of unwritten general principles of EU law:

When a single decision is addressed to all the member states the necessity for uniform application and accordingly for uniform interpretation makes it impossible to consider one version of the text in isolation but requires that it be interpreted on the basis of both the real intention of its author and the aim he seeks to achieve, and in the light in particular of the versions in all ... languages. ... Interpreted in this way the provision at issue contains nothing capable of prejudicing the fundamental human rights enshrined in the general principles of Community law and protected by the Court.

== See also ==
- European Union law
- Internationale Handelsgesellschaft mbH v Einfuhr- und Vorratsstelle für Getreide und Futtermittel (1970), another landmark case concerning the protection of fundamental rights in the European Union
- Streisand effect
