= Legal certainty =

Legal principle

Legal certainty is a principle in national and international law which holds that the law must provide those subject to it with the ability to regulate their conduct.

== See also ==
- General principles of European Union law § Legal certainty
- Vagueness § In law
- Due process
- International human rights law
- Rational basis test
