= Sport policies of the European Union =

The European Union plays a minor and mostly indirect policy role in sport, because (a) sport is normally considered to be outside the competences conferred by the member states to the European Union and (b) sport is in general organised internally, on a European continental level (which is not the same as the level of the European Union), or globally.

== Role of the EU ==
=== Direct ===
The European Union has a very limited direct role in sport. The European Commission is composed of Directorates-General and several departments. Within the Directorate-General Education and Culture, is the Sport Unit, which is responsible for the following main areas:

- cooperation within the commission and with other institutions on sport-related issues,
- cooperation with national and international sports institutions, organisations and federations,
- bilateral meetings with sports institutions and organisations and international sports federations.

One of the few specific measures in sport was taken by Decision No. 291/2003/EC of the European Parliament and of the Council of 6 February 2003 that established the European Year of Education through Sport 2004.

The activities and initiatives undertaken during 2004 were organised at Community, transnational, national, regional and local level, and was sometimes co-financed by the Community. Activities compromised for instance financial support for transnational, national, regional or local initiatives to promote education through sport.

Under the Lisbon Treaty, the EU role in sports is limited, because Article 165(4) states that the EU objectives in sports are restricted to measures "excluding any harmonisation of the laws and regulations of the Member States". As such, the EU can not adopt legislation or any other legally binding measures, instead it acts through guidelines, recommendations, and funding, in order to support its sport-related objectives.

=== Indirect ===
Although not directed specifically at sport, many of the rules, policies and programmes of the European Union affect the sports world or are of interest to it.

In particular, the common market of the European Union creates the right for any EU citizen to move and work freely in another member state. The landmark Bosman ruling confirmed that this right, when applied to professional athletes, forbids nationality quotas in sports leagues that affect EU citizens. This has changed the face of professional sports in the EU, with top teams now collecting talent from all over Europe, and sometimes even fielding teams with no domestic players at all.

== See also ==
- Sport in Europe
- Team Europe
- Directorate-General for Education and Culture
- European Week of Sport
