= European Week of Sport =

- Date: September 23–September 30
- Location: Europe
- Also known as: EWOS
- Organised by: European Commission
- Participants: EU Member states

The European Week of Sport (EWOS) aims to promote sport and physical activity across Europe at national, regional and local levels. EU Member States and partner countries are taking part having a range of activities. The dates of EWOS have been unified and the European Week of Sport is taking place between September 23 and 30.

== History ==
The European Week of Sport was launched in 2015 to respond to the growing crisis of inactivity. Sport and physical activity makes a significant contribution to the well-being of European citizens. Since 2015, the Week has continued to grow year after year, encouraging ever more Europeans to embrace a healthy and active lifestyle. From five million participants and 7,000 events in 2015, the 2018 edition drew in a staggering 12 million participants across 48,500 events.

== #BeActive Awards ==
=== Education ===
- 2022: Krokiet & Lama Academy
- 2021: TSV Neuried e.V.
- 2020: Petra Preradovica
- 2019: Schools in Motion
- 2018: Jyränkö School
- 2017: Colegio Publico Miguel de Cervantes
- 2016: St Charles National School

=== Workplace ===
- 2022: Azur Sport Santé
- 2021: iData Kft
- 2020: House of Code
- 2019: Sporta Malta
- 2018: DAVO Communications
- 2017: UAB EUGESTA
- 2016: Eesti Energia

=== Local Hero ===
- 2022: Elias Mastoras
- 2021: Alo Looke
- 2020: Tomas Slavata
- 2019: Nora Kadar-Papp
- 2018: Corinna Saric
- 2017: Jorge Pina
- 2016: Raimonds Elbakjans

=== Across Generations ===
- 2022: Univerza V Ljubljani

=== Grassroots Project ===
- 2015: TSV Wandsetal

=== Citizen Ambassador ===
- 2015: Berna Nijboer

== See also ==
- Sport policies of the European Union
