= Primacy of European Union law =

Legal principle

The primacy of European Union law (sometimes referred to as supremacy or precedence of European law) is a legal principle of rule according to higher law establishing precedence of European Union law over conflicting national laws of EU member states.

The principle was derived from an interpretation of the European Court of Justice, which ruled that European law has priority over any contravening national law, including the constitution of a member state itself. For the European Court of Justice, national courts and public officials must disapply a national norm that they consider not to be compliant with the EU law.

Some countries provide that if national and EU law contradict, courts and public officials are required to suspend the application of the national law, bring the question to the national constitutional court and wait until its decision is made. If the norm has been declared to be constitutional, they are automatically obliged to apply the national law. This can create a contradiction between the national constitutional court and the European Court of Justice, like on 7 October 2021 when the Polish Constitutional Tribunal issued a judgment in case K 3/21 challenging the primacy of EU law in certain areas of the Polish legal order.

== Development ==
In Costa v. ENEL, Flaminio Costa was an Italian citizen opposed to the nationalisation of energy companies. Because he had shares in a private corporation subsumed by the nationalised company, ENEL, he refused to pay his electricity bill in protest. In the subsequent suit brought to Italian courts by ENEL, he argued that nationalisation infringed EU law on the state distorting the market. The Italian government believed that not to be an issue that even could be complained about by a private individual since it was a decision to make by a national law. The ECJ ruled in favour of the government because the relevant treaty rule on an undistorted market was one on which the Commission alone could challenge the Italian government. As an individual, Costa had no standing to challenge the decision, because that treaty provision had no direct effect. But on the prior issue of Costa's ability to raise a point of EU law against a national government in legal proceedings before the courts in that member state the ECJ disagreed with the Italian government. It ruled that EU law would not be effective if Costa could not challenge national law on the basis of its alleged incompatibility with EU law.

It follows from all these observations that the law stemming from the treaty, an independent source of law, could not, because of its special and original nature, be overridden by domestic legal provisions, however framed, without being deprived of its character as community law and without the legal basis of the community itself being called into question.

In other cases, state legislatures write the precedence of EU law into their constitutions. For example, the Constitution of Ireland contains this clause: "No provision of this Constitution invalidates laws enacted, acts done or measures adopted by the State which are necessitated by the obligations of membership of the European Union or of the Communities".

- C-106/77, Simmenthal [1978] ECR 629, duty to set aside provisions of national law that are incompatible with Union law.
- C-106/89 Marleasing [1991] ECR I-7321, national law must be interpreted and applied, if possible, to avoid a conflict with a Community rule.

Article I-6 of the European Constitution stated: "The Constitution and law adopted by the institutions of the Union in exercising competences conferred on it shall have primacy over the law of the Member States". The proposed constitution was never ratified, after being rejected in referendums in France and the Netherlands in 2005. Its replacement, the Treaty of Lisbon, did not include the article on primacy but instead included the following declaration:

17. Declaration concerning primacy
The Conference recalls that, in accordance with well settled case law of the Court of Justice of the European Union, the Treaties and the law adopted by the Union on the basis of the Treaties have primacy over the law of Member States, under the conditions laid down by the said case law.
The Conference also decided to attach as an Annex to this Final Act the Opinion of the Council Legal Service on the primacy of EC law as set out in 11197/07 (JUR 260):

Opinion of the Council Legal Service
of 22 June 2007
It results from the case-law of the Court of Justice that primacy of EU law is a cornerstone principle of Union law. According to the Court, this principle is inherent to the specific nature of the European Community. At the time of the first judgment of this established case law (Costa/ENEL,15 July 1964, Case 6/641 (^{1}) there was no mention of primacy in the treaty. It is still the case today. The fact that the principle of primacy will not be included in the future treaty shall not in any way change the existence of the principle and the existing case-law of the Court of Justice.

(^{1}) It follows (...) that the law stemming from the treaty, an independent source of law, could not, because of its special and original nature, be overridden by domestic legal provisions, however framed, without being deprived of its character as Community law and without the legal basis of the Community itself being called into question.

— Declaration 17, Consolidated EU Treaties

== Exceptions ==
The majority of national courts have generally recognized and accepted this principle, except for the part where European law outranks a member state's constitution. As a result, national constitutional courts have also reserved the right to review the conformity of EU law with national constitutional law.

In 2003 the European Court of Justice ruled in one case that the national security of member states can to some extent overrule EU laws.

== Particular countries ==
Depending on the constitutional tradition of member states, different solutions have been developed to adapt questions of incompatibility between State law and Union law to one another. EU law is accepted as having supremacy over the law of member states, but not all member states share the ECJ's analysis on why EU law takes precedence over state law if there is a conflict.

=== Belgium ===
In its ruling of 27 May 1971, often nicknamed the "Franco-Suisse Le Ski ruling" or "Cheese Spread ruling" (Dutch: Smeerkaasarrest), the Belgian Court of Cassation ruled that self-executing treaties prevail over national law, and even over the Belgian Constitution.

In 2016, the Belgian Constitutional Court ruled that there is a limit to the primacy of EU law over the Belgian Constitution. Mimicking the Identitätsvorbehalt jurisprudence of the German Constitutional Court, it ruled that the core of Belgium's constitutional identity cannot be trumped by EU law.

=== Czech Republic ===
Article 10 of the Constitution of the Czech Republic states that every international treaty ratified by the Parliament of the Czech Republic is part of the Czech legislative order and takes precedence over all other laws.

=== France ===
Like many other countries within the civil law legal tradition, France's judicial system is divided between ordinary and administrative courts. The ordinary courts accepted the supremacy of EU law in 1975, but the administrative courts accepted the doctrine only in 1990. The supreme administrative court, the Council of State, had held that as the administrative courts had no power of judicial review over legislation enacted by the French Parliament, they could not find that national legislation was incompatible with Union law or give it precedence over a conflicting State law. That was in contrast to the supreme ordinary court, the Court of Cassation; in the case of Administration des Douanes v Société 'Cafes Jacques Vabre' et SARL Wiegel et Cie, it ruled that precedence should be given to Union law over State law in line with the requirements of the Article 55 of the French Constitution, which accorded supremacy to ratified international treaty over State law. The administrative courts finally changed their position in the case of Raoul Georges Nicolo by deciding to follow the reasoning used by the Cour de cassation.

=== Germany ===
In its Solange I decision (1970), Germany's Federal Constitutional Court articulated constitutional limits on Germany's integration into the European Union. The Court expressed concern that Europe lacked either a “democratically legitimate parliament directly elected by general suffrage” or a “codified catalogue of fundamental rights.” Consequently, it argued that independent review was necessary to ensure that the unamendable protections of German Basic Law are upheld.

In response, the European Parliament, Council, and Commission issued a joint declaration emphasizing the “prime importance” of fundamental rights, as derived from both member states’ constitutions and the European Convention on Human Rights in 1977. Noting this development in Solange II, (1986) the German Constitutional Court held that so long as (German: solange) EU law had a level of protection of fundamental rights that is substantially in concurrence with the protections afforded by the German constitution, it would no longer review specific EU acts in light of that constitution.

The Solange cases engendered a “cooperative relationship” between the Federal Constitutional Court and the ECJ. This amicable rivalry greatly influenced the latter court's jurisprudence, and has been recently reanimated in light of financial disputes in Gauweiler and Others v Deutscher Bundestag (2015).

=== Ireland ===
The Third Amendment of the Constitution of Ireland explicitly provided for the supremacy of EU law in Ireland by providing that no other provision of the Irish constitution could invalidate laws enacted if they were necessitated by membership of the European Communities. In Crotty v. An Taoiseach, the Irish Supreme Court held that the ratification of the Single European Act by Ireland was not necessitated by membership of the European Communities and so could be subject to review by the courts.

=== Italy ===
In Frontini v. Ministero delle Finanze (1974), the plaintiff sought to have a national law disregarded without having to wait for the Italian Constitutional Court do so. The ECJ ruled that every State's supreme court must apply Union law in its entirety.

=== Lithuania ===
The Lithuanian Constitutional Court concluded on 14 March 2006 in case no. 17/02-24/02-06/03-22/04, § 9.4 in Chapter III, that EU law has supremacy over ordinary legal acts of the Lithuanian Parliament but not over the Lithuanian constitution. If the Constitutional Court finds EU law to be contrary to the constitution, the former law loses its direct effect and shall remain inapplicable.

=== Malta ===
Article 65 of the Maltese constitution provides that all laws made by Parliament must be consistent with EU law and Malta's obligations deriving from its Treaty of Accession.

=== Netherlands ===
The Constitution of the Kingdom of the Netherlands functions as a codification of political practice rather than a normative collection of robust guarantees. As in the United Kingdom, the legislature has broad authority to define constitutional law as well as limits on the protection of rights. The Constitution enshrines neither an absolute right to a fair trial, life, or property, and it provides few guidelines for the formation of governments. Moreover, judicial review of the constitutionality of parliamentary acts was prohibited in 1848.

Nevertheless, EU integration has been a relatively seamless process due to the Netherlands’ monist legal order, which considers international law on par with national law even absent any implementing statute. Treaty review powers have consequently expanded the authority of Dutch courts significantly, with the EU's Charter of Fundamental Rights serving as a de facto judicially-enforceable bill of rights. The Netherlands ensures that its judges are informed of EU law by offering relevant courses through the Training and Study Centre for the Judiciary, and by providing each court with an expert Coordinator for European Law responsible for offering guidance on practical legal applications.

=== Poland ===
Nie ona jednak - na zasadzie wyłączności - determinuje ostateczne decyzje podejmowane przez suwerenne państwa członkowskie w warunkach hipotetycznej kolizji pomiędzy wspólnotowym porządkiem prawnym a regulacją konstytucyjną. W polskim systemie prawnym decyzje tego typu winny być podejmowane zawsze z uwzględnieniem treści art. 8 ust. 1 Konstytucji. Zgodnie z art. 8 ust. 1 Konstytucji pozostaje ona najwyższym prawem Rzeczypospolitej.

However, it does not - on the principle of exclusivity - determine the final decisions taken by the sovereign Member States in the conditions of a hypothetical collision between Community legal orders and constitutional regulation. In the Polish legal system, this type of decisions should always take into account the content of art. 8 sec. 1 of the Constitution. According to art. 8 sec. 1 of the Constitution, the Constitution remains the highest law in the Polish Republic.

— Constitutional Tribunal on principle of Primacy of European Union law, "Verdict of the Constitutional Tribunal of Poland of May 11th, 2005"; K 18/04

While Poland rejects the idea of Primacy of European Union law as defined in case law on basis of the ruling K 18/04 of The Constitutional Tribunal it follows article 91. sec 3. of Constitution which gives international organization ability to formulate law that can overwrite Polish statutes. The law has priority in conflict with the statutes if the law is concurrent to the text of the treaty that constitutes that international organization. The ratified international agreement also overwrites the statutes if the statute is impossible to reconcile with the agreement on basis of article 91. sec 2.

The tribunal has also ruled that EU law can not override the Polish constitution. In a conflict between EU law and the constitution, constitution prevails. Poland can then make a sovereign decision as to how conflict EU law vs Constitution should be resolved (by changing the constitution, seeking to change the EU law or leaving the EU).

On 7 October 2021, Poland's Constitutional Tribunal ruled that some provisions of the EU treaties and some EU court rulings go against Poland's highest law.

=== Slovakia ===
26 September 2025, The National Council of Slovakia passed the government's constitutional amendment. It will give national law precedence over EU law in matters concerning "national identity", including issues of family and gender.

== United Kingdom as a former member state ==
The United Kingdom was a member state of the European Union and its predecessor the European Communities from 1 January 1973 until 31 January 2020. During this time the issue of EU law taking precedence over national law was a significant issue and a cause for debate both among politicians and even in the judiciary.

In R v Secretary of State for Transport, ex p Factortame Ltd, the House of Lords ruled that courts in the United Kingdom had the power to "disapply" acts of parliament if they conflicted with EU law. Lord Bridge held that Parliament had voluntarily accepted this limitation of its sovereignty and was fully aware that even if the limitation of sovereignty was not inherent in the Treaty of Rome, it had been well established by jurisprudence before Parliament passed the European Communities Act 1972.

If the supremacy within the European Community of Community Law over the national law of member states was not always inherent in the EEC Treaty it was certainly well established in the jurisprudence of the Court of Justice long before the United Kingdom joined the Community. Thus, whatever limitation of its sovereignty Parliament accepted when it enacted the European Communities Act 1972 was entirely voluntary. Under the terms of the 1972 Act it has always been clear that it was the duty of a United Kingdom court, when delivering final judgment, to override any rule of national law found to be in conflict with any directly enforceable rule of Community law.

In 2011 the UK Government, as part of the Conservative–Liberal Democrat coalition agreement following the 2010 UK general election, passed the European Union Act 2011 in an attempt to address the issue by inserting a sovereignty clause. The clause was enacted in section 18 which says:

Directly applicable or directly effective EU law (that is, the rights, powers, liabilities, obligations, restrictions, remedies and procedures referred to in section 2(1) of the European Communities Act 1972) falls to be recognised and available in law in the United Kingdom only by virtue of that Act or where it is required to be recognised and available in law by virtue of any other Act.

However, in the 2014 case of R (HS2 Action Alliance Ltd) v Secretary of State for Transport, the Supreme Court of the United Kingdom said:

The United Kingdom has no written constitution, but we have a number of constitutional instruments. They include Magna Carta, the Petition of Right 1628, the Bill of Rights and (in Scotland) the Claim of Rights Act 1689, the Act of Settlement 1701 and the Act of Union 1707. The European Communities Act 1972, the Human Rights Act 1998 and the Constitutional Reform Act 2005 may now be added to this list. The common law itself also recognises certain principles as fundamental to the rule of law. It is, putting the point at its lowest, certainly arguable (and it is for United Kingdom law and courts to determine) that there may be fundamental principles, whether contained in other constitutional instruments or recognised at common law, of which Parliament when it enacted the European Communities Act 1972 did not either contemplate or authorise the abrogation.

At 23:00 GMT (00:00 CET in Brussels) on 31 January 2020, after 47 years of membership, the United Kingdom became the first member state to formally leave the European Union. It did so under the terms of the Brexit withdrawal agreement. At the same time, the European Communities Act 1972 (ECA 1972), the piece of legislation that incorporated EU law (Community law as it was in 1972) into the domestic law of the United Kingdom, was repealed by the European Union (Withdrawal) Act 2018, although the effect of the 1972 Act was saved by the provisions of the European Union (Withdrawal Agreement) Act 2020 to enable EU law to continue to have legal effect within the UK until the end of the implementation period, which ended on 31 December 2020. Since the implementation period has now ended, EU law no longer applies to the UK. However the principle of the supremacy of EU law applies to the interpretation of retained EU law.

In September 2021 the UK government announced a review of retained EU law, aiming to remove the special status retained European Union law currently holds in the United Kingdom, and to repeal retained EU laws which are "no longer right for the UK".

The Retained EU Law (Revocation and Reform) Act 2023 became law in June 2023, the act allows the UK government to revoke retained EU laws, modify those remaining and changes how such laws are interpreted. The original act aimed to revoke over 4000 laws by the end of 2023, however this was later reduced to 800, with the remaining laws still under review. The act took effect on the 1st January 2024, as a result retained EU law supremacy has ended within the UK, and retained laws no longer need to be interpreted in line with EU law principles.

== See also ==
- Thoburn v Sunderland City Council (2002)
- Van Gend en Loos v Nederlandse Administratie der Belastingen (1963)
- National Identity Clause
- Paramountcy (Canada) – analogous doctrine in Canadian constitutional law
- Principle of conferral
- Supremacy Clause, analogous concept within the Constitution of the United States
- Section 109 of the Constitution of Australia – analogous concept within the Constitution of Australia
- Subsidiarity (European Union)
