= Subsidiarity in European Union law =

Principle of governance of the European Union

The principle of subsidiarity is applied in the European Union, meaning that decisions are retained by Member States unless collective action of the Union is necessary. The European Union should take action collectively only when Member States' individual power is insufficient. The principle of subsidiarity applied to the European Union can be summarised as "Europe where necessary, national where possible". Subsidiarity is balanced by the primacy of European Union law.

The principle of subsidiarity is premised from the fundamental EU principle of conferral, ensuring that the European Union is a union of member states and competences are voluntarily conferred by Member States. The conferral principle also guarantees the principle of proportionality, establishing that the European Union should undertake only the minimum necessary actions.

The principle of subsidiarity is one of the core principles of the European law, and is especially important to the European intergovernmentalist school of thought.

The intellectual origin of the principle of subsidiarity lies in the Christian democratic concept of subsidiarity.

== EU recognition of the principle of subsidiarity ==
The term "principle of subsidiarity" was first used in the Treaty on European Union (1992). However, the European Parliament was still the initiator of the concept of subsidiarity. On 14 February 1984, The European Union adopted the draft Treaty on European Union, proposed a provision specifying that in cases where the Treaty conferred on the Union a competence which was concurrent with that of the Member States, the Member States could act as long as the Union had not legislated. Moreover, it stressed that the Community should only act to carry out those tasks which could be undertaken more effectively in common than by individual states acting separately. It was also incorporated in 1986 in The Single European Act with its environmental policy. However, this was without referring to it explicitly. It was mentioned for the first time in 1992 in the Treaty establishing the European Community (TEC) as amended by the Maastricht Treaty. The Article 3b states: "In areas which do not fall within its exclusive competence, the Community shall take action in accordance with the principle of subsidiarity only if and in so far as the objectives of the proposed action cannot be sufficiently achieved by the Member States and can therefore by reason of the scale or effects of the proposed action be better achieved by the Community".

The Treaty on the European Union (TEU), also written in 1992, states: "decisions are taken as closely as possible to the citizen in accordance with the principle of subsidiarity."

In 1997, the Treaty of Amsterdam included a Protocol on the principles of subsidiarity and proportionality establishing the conditions of application of both principles. It is established that the Union wishes that "decisions are taken as closely as possible to the citizens of the Union" and that "the overall approach to the application of the subsidiarity principle […] will continue to guide the actions of the Union's institutions as well as the development of the application of the principle of subsidiarity". In the consolidated version of the EU treaty is it referred to as "Protocol (No 2)".

The Treaty of Lisbon places in 2007 the principle of subsidiarity as one of the fundamental principles of the European Union. The article 3b states: "The limits of Union competences are governed by the principle of conferral. The use of Union competences is governed by the principles of subsidiarity and proportionality". Since the Lisbon Treaty came into force at the end of 2009, national Parliaments have a role in policing the principle of subsidiarity. Under the so-called Early Warning System, they can submit reasoned opinions if they feel a new Commission proposal violates the subsidiarity principle (van Gruisen and Huysmans, 2020).

== The principle of subsidiarity in EU governance ==
The unprecedented development of subsidiarity in the European Union in the 1990s was caused by the increase of EU policies in the post-Maastricht period. In the 1990s, the European Union was preparing for the future enlargement of Central and Eastern European Countries (CEECs) as well as for the establishment of the Eurozone, and therefore needed to reinforce its task-allocation model. This model, called EU competences, is subject to the two fundamental principles of subsidiarity and proportionality.

=== EU competences ===
There are three competences in the European Union governance:

- exclusive competence: the European Union alone is able to legislate and adopt binding acts. Therefore, the principle of subsidiarity does not apply to this set.
- shared competence: the European Union and the Member States are able to legislate and adopt binding acts. When the union does not exercise its own competence, or refuses to, the Member States exercise their own competence.
- supporting competence: the European Union can legislate and adopt binding acts only to support, coordinate or complement the actions of Member States. Legally binding acts must require the harmonisation of the Member States.

Competences of the European Union in relation to those of its member states

Exclusive competence

Shared competence

Supporting competence

The Union has exclusive competence to make directives and conclude international agreements when provided for in a Union legislative act as to …
- the customs union
- the establishing of the competition rules necessary for the functioning of the internal market
- monetary policy for the Member States whose currency is the euro
- the conservation of marine biological resources under the common fisheries policy
- Common Commercial Policy
- conclusion of certain international agreements

Member States cannot exercise competence in areas where the Union has done so, that is …
- the internal market
- social policy, for the aspects defined in TFEU
- economic, social and territorial cohesion
- agriculture and fisheries, excluding the conservation of marine biological resources
- environment
- consumer protection
- transport
- trans-European networks
- energy
- the area of freedom, security and justice
- common safety concerns in public health matters, for the aspects defined in TFEU

Union exercise of competence shall not result in Member States being prevented from exercising theirs in …
- research, technological development and (outer) space
- development cooperation, humanitarian aid

The Union coordinates Member States policies or implements supplemental to their common policies not covered elsewhere in …
- the coordination of economic, employment and social policies
- common foreign, security and defence policies

The Union can carry out actions to support, coordinate or supplement Member States' actions in …
- the protection and improvement of human health
- industry
- culture
- tourism
- education, youth, sport and vocational training
- civil protection (disaster prevention)
- administrative cooperation

The principle of subsidiarity guarantees that in the area of non-exclusive competences, the Union may act only if an action cannot be sufficiently achieved at the Member States level, and could be better achieved at the Union level.

=== Federalist v. Intergovernmentalist schools of thought ===
Since its inception, the European Community, then becoming the European Union, has faced the remarks and critics of two main school of thoughts: the federalists, defending a centralised decision-making model, and the intergovernmentalists, in favour of a broader share of competences.

On one side, the federalist school is in favour of more supranational decisions. For them, most of the decisions should be taken at a central level, by the Union, in order to improve the efficiency of decision-making, enjoy scale economies and avoid negative spillovers issued from local decisions. The fiscal federalism theory therefore perceives the principle of subsidiarity as a guarantee that the decisions will be taken at central level when there would demonstrable benefits of conducting the policy by the Union.

On the other side, the school of intergovernmentalism defends a decentralized model and more decisions taken by Member States, with a process in which the local knowledge enables to take the most adapted decisions and the citizens can express their disagreement by direct contact with the politicians or leaving the region (Voice or Exit principle). For the intergovernmentalist theory, the principle of subsidiarity guarantees that decisions will be taken as closely as possible to citizens, and therefore at the lowest level possible.

The EU principle of subsidiarity is seen by the literature as sufficiently unbounded to satisfy both schools of thought and approach to centralization.

== The principle of subsidiarity in EU environment policy ==
=== EU environmental policy ===
The Paris Summit in 1972 announced the development of an Environmental Action Programme. This European initiative demonstrated the European Economic Community's endorsement in environmental policymaking by defining medium and long-term goals and actions. Historically the task-allocation model of the EU environmental policy has been widely criticised, pointing out the lack of European coordination being an obstacle to the decision-making. Therefore, the European Union increased progressively its power over the years, mainly by a series of amendments to the Treaty of Rome and the increase of its EU bodies's influence over individual Member States.

The EU environmental policy is a shared competence between the Union and Member States: the Member States are able to exercise their competence only if the Union has not already exercised its competence.

=== EU ordinary legislative procedure ===
Based on the ordinary legislative procedure, the EU Council (formed of the leaders of the 27 Member States) can propose suggestions of environmental legislation to the European Commission, who has the exclusive right to propose new environmental policies to the European Parliament (directly elected body) and the Council of the EU (made of Member States' environment Ministers). After they received the proposal, the European Parliament and the Council of the EU follow the co-decision procedure and review the proposal; they can either reject, amend or approve the proposal. If approved, the European Commission has the responsibility to ensure the implementation of the environmental legislation by Member States.

=== European Environment Agency ===
The European Environment Agency (EEA) was created in 1994 and is a European agency providing information on the environment. Its headquarter is located in Copenhagen, Denmark. Its management board is made up of representatives of 32 states (the 27 European Union member states together with Iceland, Liechtenstein, Norway, Switzerland and Turkey), a representative of the European Commission and scientists appointed by the European Parliament.

The EEA helps the EU institutional bodies in the development, implementation and evaluation of the EU environmental policy, but does not have any competence in the legislation and adoption of binding acts in this field.
