= Solange II =

1986 German constitutional and EU law case

- Court: Federal Constitutional Court
- Citation: (22 October 1986) BVerfGE 73, 339, [1987] 3 CMLR 225

Keywords
- Direct effect

Re Wünsche Handelsgesellschaft (22 October 1986) BVerfGE 73, 339, is a German constitutional law and EU law case, concerning the conflict of law between the German national legal system and European Union law. It is popularly known as Solange II because of a key phrase "so long as" in the judgment.

== Facts ==
The appellant applied for an import license and was refused. The appellant challenged the import licensing regime (Regulation 2107/74) in the Frankfurt Administrative Court (Verwaltungsgericht), but the case was dismissed. The court held that the regulation was passed in accordance with the objectives of art. 39 EC (art. 45 TFEU).

The case was appealed to the Federal Supreme Administrative Court (Bundesverwaltungsgericht), which suspended the case and sent a preliminary reference to the European Court of Justice (ECJ). The ECJ responded that the regulation was valid. In response, the appellant appealed to the German Federal Constitutional Court (GFCC, BVerfG, Bundesverfassungsgericht), citing several breaches of German constitutional rights. The appellant claimed that, following with the judgment of Solange I, the GFCC should disapply EU law which conflicts with the fundamental rights protection afforded in the German Basic Law (Grundgesetz).

== Judgment ==
=== German Federal Constitutional Court ===
The Federal Constitutional Court (Bundesverfassungsgericht) ultimately rejected the complaint. It considered, since the 1974 Solange I decision, the ECJ’s development of protection for fundamental rights, the adoption of declarations on rights and democracy by the Community institutions, and that all EC Member States had acceded to the European Convention on Human Rights.

In view of these developments, it must be held that, so long as the European Communities (Solange die Europäischen Gemeinschaften...) and in particular the case law of the European Court, generally ensure an effective protection of fundamental rights as against the sovereign powers of the Communities which is to be regarded as substantially similar to the protection of fundamental rights required unconditionally by the Constitution, and in so far as they generally safeguard the essential content of fundamental rights, the Federal Constitutional Court will no longer exercise its jurisdiction to decide on the applicability of secondary Community legislation cited as the legal basis for any acts of German civil courts or authorities within the sovereign jurisdiction of the Federal Republic of Germany, and it will no longer review such legislation by the standard of the fundamental rights contained in the Constitution.

This in effect meant that the authority of the ECJ in Germany was accepted by the Federal Court, so long as the ECJ rulings conformed to the principles of German national law.

== Significance ==
In contrast to the earlier Solange I decision, the Federal Constitutional Court accepted the judgment of the ECJ as binding and final in Germany. It is notable that the GFCC did not give up its competence to scrutinize EU law in light of the German Basic Law's fundamental rights. Rather they suspended this scrutiny, to be renewed if a case could demonstrate a decline of fundamental rights standards in the EU below those guaranteed by the Basic Law.

Additionally, both Solange I and Solange II demonstrate an atmosphere of constructive argument within the European courts. The Solange Doctrine of the GFCC spurred the ECJ and EU institutions to eventually develop their own systems of fundamental rights protection, offering an equal or higher level of protection than the German Basic Law.

== See also ==
- European Union law
- Internationale Handelsgesellschaft (Solange I)
