= Outright Monetary Transactions =

Program of the European Central Bank

Outright Monetary Transactions (OMT) is a program of the European Central Bank under which the bank makes purchases ("outright transactions") in secondary, sovereign bond markets, under certain conditions, of bonds issued by Eurozone member-states. The program was presented by its supporters as a principal manifestation of Mario Draghi's (July 2012) commitment to do "whatever it takes" to preserve the euro.

OMT is considered by the European Central Bank once a Eurozone government asks for financial assistance. The Eurozone has established the European Stability Mechanism and the European Financial Stability Facility bailout funds in order to meet the challenges of the Euro area crisis. From these funds and through OMT, the Eurozone's central bank can, henceforth, buy government bonds that mature in 1 to 3 years, provided the bond-issuing countries agree to certain domestic economic measures – the latter being the so-called term of "conditionality". The aim of the programme is to prevent divergence in short-term bond yields, and to ensure the ECB's monetary policy is transmitted equally to all Eurozone economies. The central bank notes the mechanism is meant as a means to "safeguard an appropriate monetary policy transmission and the singleness of the monetary policy". Interventions through the program are stipulated to be potentially limitless.

Outright Monetary Transactions are not the same as quantitative easing (QE) operations, since, in the latter, the central banks buy bonds and, by doing so, inject liquidity into the banking system, with the aim of stimulating economic activity. The ECB has made clear that the principle of "full sterilisation" will apply, whereby the bank will be reabsorbing the money pumped into the system "by any means necessary". In practice, the only means of sterilisation used has been the auctioning of sufficient quantities of one-week deposits at the ECB – the same means of sterilisation that the ECB used for its previous bond-buying programme, the SMP.

== Launch ==
On 2 August 2012, the Governing Council of the European Central Bank (ECB) announced that it would undertake outright transactions in secondary, sovereign bond markets, aimed "at safeguarding an appropriate monetary policy transmission and the singleness of the monetary policy". The technical framework of these operations was formulated on 6 September 2012. The program was adopted with near unanimity, the President of the Bundesbank being the sole vote against. On the same date, the bank's Securities Markets Programme (SMP) was terminated.

== Use, conditions, and duration of assistance ==
European Central Bank president Mario Draghi has stated that the bank's Governing Council is empowered to decide on the start, continuation and suspension of Outright Monetary Transactions, "in full discretion and acting in accordance with its monetary policy mandate".

For the OMT to be activated towards a certain eurozone state, a total of four conditions need to be fully met:

1. The state needs to have received financial sovereign support from the eurozone's bailout funds EFSF/ESM, either in the form of direct macroeconomic support or precautionary conditioned credit lines. Receiving a bank recapitalization support package, like Spain did, does not qualify.
2. The signed conditioned Memorandum of Understanding attached to the EFSF/ESM sovereign support programme, shall be complied with at the time of OMT purchases. If under review, no OMT purchases will happen until the review has been concluded with the finding of programme compliance.
3. OMT purchases can at the earliest start, upon the time when the state has managed to regain complete access to private lending markets. According to ECB's definition, a sovereign state will have managed to regain complete access to private lending markets, only when it has succeeded to issue a new government bond series with a 10-year maturity.
4. OMT purchases of the government bonds with 1–3 year maturity, will finally only happen, if ECB after all 3 above pre-conditions have been found to be met, at the same time find that the market traded interest rate values for the government bonds are distressed, at some higher values compared to what can be justified by the fundamental economic data for the concerned state.

OMT operations end once "their objectives are achieved" or when there is non-compliance with the macroeconomic adjustment or precautionary programme.

During the first year, after the new OMT instrument had been born, it was never used. Yet, it was evaluated to have delivered a significant positive impact to solve the problem with a broken monetary transaction mechanism, resulting in some more fairly priced interest rate levels for states under sovereign financial support programmes from EFSF/ESM. Because, as a member of the Executive Board of the ECB, Benoît Cœuré, described it

OMTs are an insurance device against redenomination risk, in the sense of reducing the probability attached to worst-case scenarios. As for any insurance mechanism, OMTs face a trade-off between insurance and incentives, but their specific design was effective in aligning ex-ante incentives with ex-post efficiency.

At the end of 2014, the group of states eligible to receive OMT support were only Portugal and Ireland. As none of them, however, had met the fourth condition for support (suffering from distressed interest rates upon the time of their regain of complete access to private lending markets), still no OMTs had been activated by ECB. The next states presumed to have been potential candidates to receive OMT were Greece (expected to regain "complete access to lending markets" in 2015 but did not at that time) and Cyprus (also expected to regain complete access to lending markets in 2015 and also did not make it).

== Program evaluation ==
Following the announcement of the ECB in the second half of 2012 government bond spreads within the Eurozone went down considerably. According to economics professor Paul De Grauwe, economist Yuemei Ji and researchers at the Cass Business School, this decline can be mainly attributed to OMT, making the sheer announcement of the program effective in its own right.

At the same time, as Paul Krugman notes, "the ECB's efforts rely to an important extent on a bluff, in the sense that nobody knows what would happen if OMT were actually required".

Post-Keynesian economists have expressed their doubts about OMT's effectiveness in dealing with the Euro area crisis, some arguing that the program will "fail", because "it doesn't address the core problem – that southern Europe is in depression and the only way out [of it] is for budget deficits to expand."

An ECB working paper evaluated the efficacy of OMT policies. That paper found that such policies "decreased the Italian and Spanish two-year government bond yields by about two percentage points, while leaving unchanged the bond yields of the same maturity in Germany and France". Moreover, "the scenario analysis suggests that the reduction in bond yields due to OMT announcements is associated with a significant increase in real activity, credit, and prices in Italy and Spain with relatively muted spillovers in France and Germany."

== Controversy and legal challenge ==
The decision of the European Central Bank to enact OMT operations was not adopted unanimously, with the German representative voting against it. Germany's Central Bank president Jens Weidmann, along with German economy minister Philipp Roesler had expressed their opposition to ECB's bond-buying plan, arguing that it might erode "the willingness of Eurozone member-states to implement reforms".

The OMT decision has also been challenged in the German Federal Constitutional Court by members of the German Bundestag, including German politician Peter Gauweiler, and by the German political party Die Linke. The German Constitutional Court requested a preliminary ruling from the European Court of Justice (ECJ) concerning the compatibility of the OMT decision with the Treaty on the Functioning of the European Union (Case C-62/14). In its request for a preliminary ruling, the German Constitutional Court expressed doubts about the legality of OMT under German and EU law. In January 2015, an Advocate General Opinion stated that the programme is in principle compatible with Treaty on the Functioning of the European Union. ECJ made its final ruling of the case in June 2015, declaring the conditional "OMT program" to be legal, as it due to its attached conditions "does not exceed the powers of the ECB in relation to monetary policy and does not contravene the prohibition of monetary financing of EU nations".

== See also ==
- List of acronyms associated with the eurozone crisis
