= Solange I =

1970 German and EU legal case

- Court: German Constitutional Court
- Citation: (1970) Case 11/70

Keywords
- European Union law primacy

Internationale Handelsgesellschaft mbH v Einfuhr- und Vorratsstelle für Getreide und Futtermittel (1970) Case 11/70 is a landmark EU law case and German constitutional law case concerning the conflict of law between a national legal system and the laws of the European Union. It is commonly known as Solange I because of a key phrase "so long as" in the judgment.

== Facts ==
The Common Agricultural Policy permitted exports only by exporters who obtained an export licence, on a deposit of money, that could be forfeited if they failed to make the export during the licence’s validity period. The Internationale Handelsgesellschaft mbH claimed that the licensing system was a disproportionate violation of their right to conduct a business under the German constitution (Grundgesetz), because it did more than was necessary to achieve the public objective at hand.

The German Administrative Court (Verwaltungsgericht) made a reference to the ECJ.

== Judgment ==
=== European Court of Justice ===
The ECJ held that the validity of EU measures cannot be challenged on grounds of national law rules or concepts, even if that is a violation of fundamental human rights provisions in a member state's constitution. European Community law did, however, respect fundamental rights, as in member state systems. But here there was no fundamental right violation.

3. Recourse to the legal rules or concepts of national law in order to judge the validity of measures adopted by the institutions of the Community would have an adverse effect on the uniformity and efficacy of Community law. The validity of such measures can only be judged in the light of Community law. ...
4. However, an examination should be made as to whether or not any analogous guarantee inherent in Community law has been disregarded. In fact, respect for fundamental rights forms an integral part of the general principles of law protected by the Court of Justice. The protection of such rights, whilst inspired by the constitutional traditions common to the Member States, must be ensured within the framework of the structure and objectives of the Community. It must therefore be ascertained, in the light of the doubts expressed by the Verwaltungsgericht, whether the system of deposits has infringed rights of a fundamental nature, respect for which must be ensured in the Community legal system.

The case then returned to the German Administrative Court (Verwaltungsgericht). Given the conflict it potentially faced, it then requested a ruling from the German Constitutional Court.

=== German Constitutional Court ===
The German Constitutional Court (Bundesverfassungsgericht) held that so long as fundamental rights protection was evident, it would not scrutinise EU action in detail.

Article 24 of the Constitution deals with the transfer of sovereign rights to inter-state institutions. This... does not open the way to amending the basic structure of the Constitution, which forms the basis of its identity, without a formal amendment to the Constitution, that is, it does not open any such way through the legislation of the inter-state institution....

[...]

But Article 24 of the Constitution limits this possibility in that it nullifies any amendment of the Treaty which would destroy the identity of the valid constitutional structure of the Federal Republic of Germany by encroaching on the structures which go to make it up...

[...]

The Community still lacks a democratically legitimated Parliament directly elected by general suffrage which possesses legislative powers and to which the Community organs empowered to legislate are fully responsible on a political level. It still lacks in particular a codified catalogue of fundamental rights, the substance of which is reliably and unambiguously fixed for the future in the same way as the substance of the Constitution....

[...]

Provisionally, therefore, in the hypothetical case of a conflict between Community law and... the guarantees of fundamental rights in the Constitution... the guarantee of fundamental rights in the Constitution prevails as long as the competent organs of the Community have not removed the conflict of norms in accordance with the Treaty mechanism.

== Significance ==
The case is important because it addresses what appears to be one of the most difficult challenges facing the acceptance of the supremacy of European law within the German legal order, that is, the possibility of conflict between a European law obligation and a fundamental right protected by the German Constitution. As Weiler has argued, it was virtually impossible that the national courts would accept European law supremacy without a guarantee of human rights protection. In this light, the significance of Internationale Handelsgesellschaft was that the European Court of Justice itself took on a role protecting the fundamental rights of individuals in the European legal order, allowing the German Constitutional Court to adopt an accommodating approach to the continuing development of the supremacy of European law within the German legal order.

This approach to the case may perhaps overemphasise the sensitivity and difficulty of the problem however. The judgments of the German Constitutional Court on possible conflicts between treaty obligations and German constitutional rights throughout the postwar era demonstrate that the Court has been extremely cautious about finding that Germany’s treaty obligations violate the fundamental rights protected by the German Constitution, and indeed that the German Constitutional Court has consistently tended to accommodate the constitutionality of such treaty obligations since the 1950s.

Subsequently, in Re Wünsche Handelsgesellschaft in a case where an EC import licensing system was challenged in the German Court, but held valid by the ECJ, the BVerfGE revised its approach. It held that because, since 1974, the ECJ had developed protection for fundamental rights, declarations on rights and democracy had been made by the Community institutions, and all EC Member States had acceded to the European Convention on Human Rights, it would no longer scrutinise EU law in every case. It said,

In view of these developments, it must be held that, so long as the European Communities, and in particular the case law of the European Court, generally ensure an effective protection of fundamental rights as against the sovereign powers of the Communities which is to be regarded as substantially similar to the protection of fundamental rights required unconditionally by the Constitution, and in so far as they generally safeguard the essential content of fundamental rights, the Federal Constitutional Court will no longer exercise its jurisdiction to decide on the applicability of secondary Community legislation cited as the legal basis for any acts of German civil courts or authorities within the sovereign jurisdiction of the Federal Republic of Germany, and it will no longer review such legislation by the standard of the fundamental rights contained in the Constitution.

This is popularly known as the Solange II judgment.

== See also ==
- European Union law
- Solange II
- Stauder v City of Ulm, a landmark case (1969) concerning the protection of human rights in the European Union
