= Principle of conferral =

EU acts at the behest of its members

The principle of conferral is a fundamental principle of European Union law. According to this principle, the EU is a union of its member states, and all its competences are voluntarily conferred on it by its member states. The Union has no competences by right, and thus any areas of policy not explicitly agreed in treaties by all member states remain the domain of the member states. This indicates that the member states have the right to deal with all matters that fall outside the agreements of the Treaties and the EU can only act within the conferred competences defined by the Member States in the treaties.

This principle has always underpinned the European Union, but it was explicitly specified for the first time in the proposed and rejected Treaty establishing a Constitution for Europe. The principle carried over into its replacement, the Treaty on European Union (TEU). It is spelled out fully in Articles 4 and 5 of the TEU.

Both Articles make clear that the Union acts only within the limits of the competences conferred upon it by the Member States, but then state clearly that "Competences not conferred upon the Union in the Treaties remain with the Member States." Article 4(1) repeats this and goes on to stipulate that "The Union shall respect the equality of Member States before the Treaties as well as their national identities, inherent in their fundamental structures, political and constitutional, inclusive of regional and local self-government. It shall respect their essential State functions, including ensuring the territorial integrity of the State, maintaining law and order and safeguarding national security. In particular, national security remains the sole responsibility of each Member State."

In many areas the Union has shared competence with the Member States. Once the Union has passed legislation in these fields competence moves to the Union.

== See also ==
- Tenth Amendment to the United States Constitution
- Devolution
- Subsidiarity (European Union)
