= Treaty on European Union =

Treaty setting out the basis of European Union law

The Treaty on European Union (2007) is one of the primary Treaties of the European Union, alongside the Treaty on the Functioning of the European Union (TFEU). The TEU forms the basis of EU law, by setting out general principles of the EU's purpose, the governance of its central institutions (such as the Commission, Parliament, and Council), as well as the rules on external, foreign and security policy.

== History ==
While the current version of the TEU entered into force in 2009, following the Treaty of Lisbon (2007), the older form of the same document was implemented by the Maastricht Treaty (1992).

== Provisions ==
After the preamble the consolidated treaty text is divided into six parts.

=== Title I: Common Provisions ===
The first deals with common provisions. Article 1 establishes the European Union, formally replacing the European Community, declares a "process of creating an ever closer union among the peoples of Europe", and lays out the legal value of the treaties.

Article 2 states that the EU is "founded on the values of respect for human dignity, freedom, democracy, equality, the rule of law and respect for human rights, including the rights of persons belonging to minorities". The member states share a "society in which pluralism, non-discrimination, tolerance, justice, solidarity and equality between women and men prevail".

Article 3 then states the aims of the EU in six points. The first is simply to promote peace, European values and its citizens' well-being. The second relates to free movement with external border controls in place. Point 3 deals with the internal market. Point 4 establishes the euro. Point 5 states the EU shall promote its values, contribute to eradicating poverty, observe human rights and respect the charter of the United Nations. The final sixth point states that the EU shall pursue these objectives by "appropriate means" according with its competences given in the treaties.

Article 4 relates to member states' sovereignty and obligations. Article 5 sets out the principles of conferral, subsidiarity and proportionality with respect to the limits of its powers. Article 6 binds the EU to the Charter of Fundamental Rights of the European Union and the European Convention on Human Rights. Article 7 deals with the suspension of a member state and article 8 deals with establishing close relations with neighbouring states.

=== Title II: Provisions on democratic principles ===
Article 9 establishes the equality of national citizens and citizenship of the European Union. Article 10 declares that the EU is founded in representative democracy and that decisions must be taken as closely as possible to citizens. It makes reference to European political parties and how citizens are represented: directly in the Parliament and by their governments in the Council and European Council – accountable to national parliaments. Article 11 establishes government transparency, declares that broad consultations must be made and introduces provision for a petition where at least 1 million citizens may petition the Commission to legislate on a matter. Article 12 gives national parliaments limited involvement in the legislative process.

=== Title III: Provisions on the institutions ===
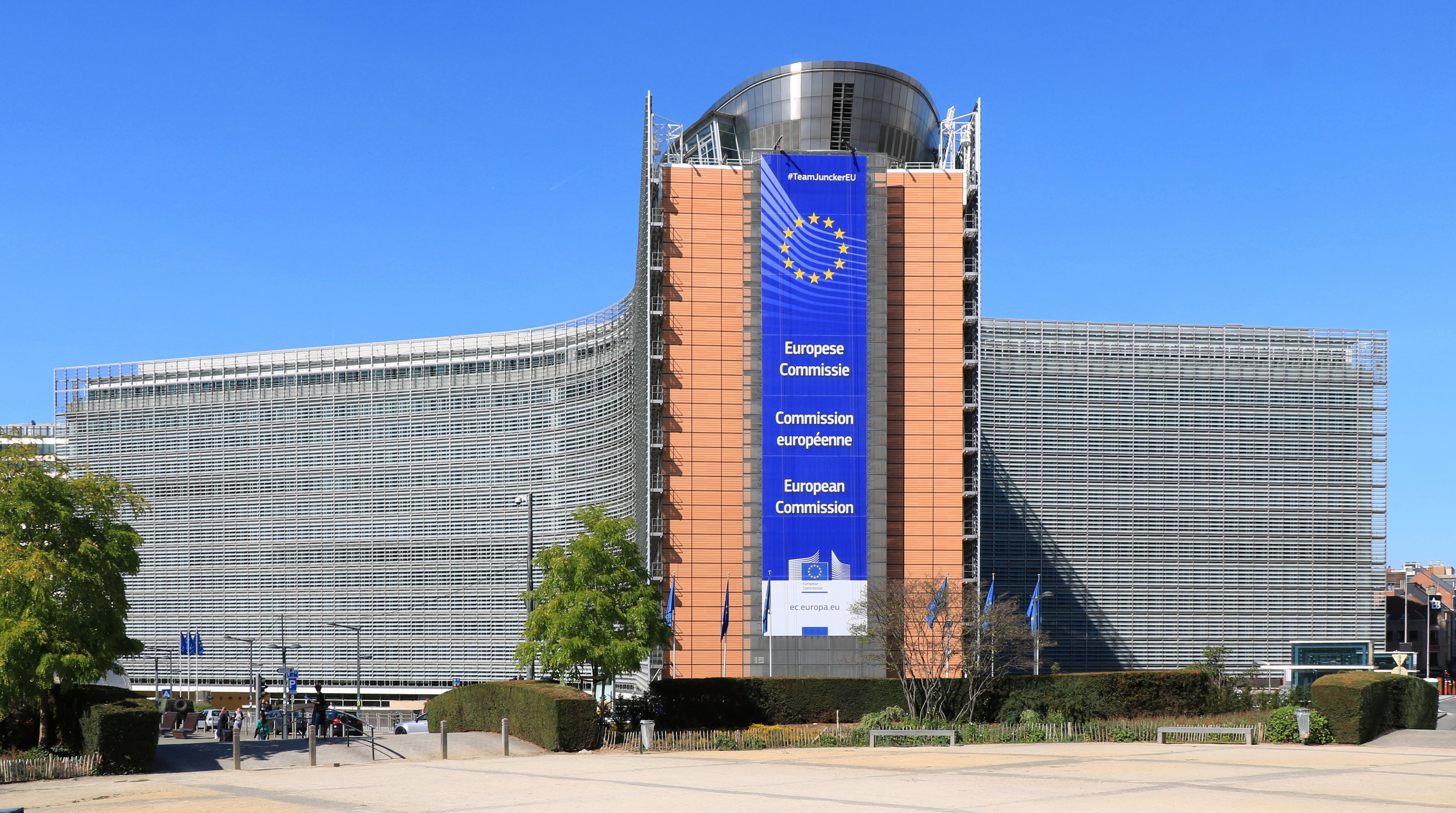
The Berlaymont Building, seat of the European Commission in Brussels

Article 13 establishes the institutions in the following order and under the following names: the European Parliament, the European Council, the Council, the European Commission, the Court of Justice of the European Union, the European Central Bank and the Court of Auditors. It obliges co-operation between these and limits their competencies to the powers within the treaties.

Article 14 deals with the workings of Parliament and its election, article 15 with the European Council and its president, article 16 with the Council and its configurations and article 17 with the Commission and its appointment. Article 18 establishes the High Representative of the Union for Foreign Affairs and Security Policy and article 19 establishes the Court of Justice.

=== Title IV: Provisions on enhanced co-operation ===
Title 4 has only one article which allows a limited number of member states to co-operate within the EU if others are blocking integration in that field.

=== Title V: General provisions on the Union's external action ===
Chapter 1 of this title includes articles 21 and 22. Article 21 deals with the principles that outline EU foreign policy; including compliance with the UN charter, promoting global trade, humanitarian support and global governance. Article 22 gives the European Council, acting unanimously, control over defining the EU's foreign policy.

Chapter 2 is further divided into sections. The first, common provisions, details the guidelines and functioning of the EU's foreign policy, including establishment of the European External Action Service and member state's responsibilities. Section 2, articles 42 to 46, deal with military co-operation (including mutual defence).

On 17 November 2015, France called other member states for military assistance, on the basis of the Article 42. This was the first time the article had ever been applied and all of the member states were reported to respond in agreement. However at least one member state (Finland) made a conclusion that due to conflicting national law, military assistance was excluded.

=== Title VI: Final provisions ===
Article 47 establishes a legal personality for the EU. Article 48 deals with the method of treaty amendment; specifically the ordinary and simplified revision procedures. Article 49 deals with applications to join the EU and Article 50 with withdrawal. In the aftermath of the Brexit vote in the UK on 23 June 2016, the United Kingdom formally invoked Article 50 in March 2017, giving notice that it would leave the EU within two years. Article 51 deals with the protocols attached to the treaties and article 52 with the geographic application of the treaty. Article 53 states the treaty is in force for an unlimited period, article 54 deals with ratification and 55 with the different language versions of the treaties.
