= Maria Antonia Paris =

Venerable Maria Antònia París
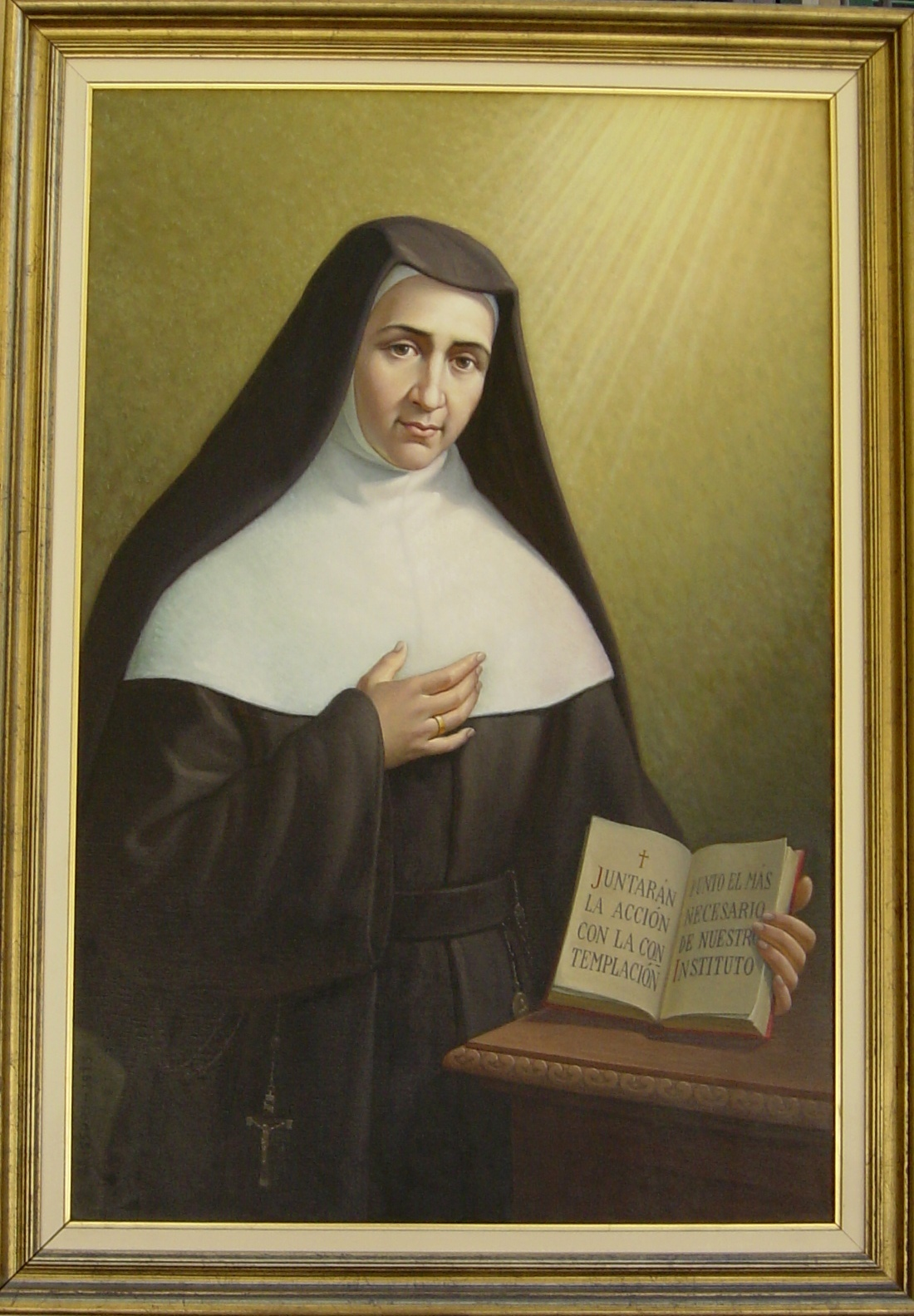
- Born: June 28, 1813; Vallmoll, Catalonia, Spain
- Died: January 17, 1885 (aged 71); Reus, Spain

Maria Antonia Paris (June 28, 1813 – January 17, 1885) was a Catholic nun who founded in 1855 the Claretian Sisters in Cuba.

She was born in the town of Vallmoll, Catalonia. Her father, a farmer, died before she was born and her mother had fled to escape the invading French army led by Napoleon. She joined the Sisters of the Company of Mary, Our Lady in 1841 as a postulant, but because of a ban on entering religious orders by the government of Spain, she did not become a novice until April 1850. While she was praying for the Catholic Church, she reported hearing a call from God to create a new religious order.

In 1850 she met the priest Anthony Mary Claret who had recently founded the Congregation of Missionaries, Sons of the Immaculate Heart of the Blessed Virgin Mary. Claret agreed to help her with this task but in October of that year was named Archbishop of Santiago, Cuba After some months of discernment, Paris, on the advice of her spiritual director, Dr. Caixal, and P. Gatell, she decided to leave the Company of Mary. She and another novice lived the religious life in Tarragona; they were soon joined by three other young women.

Archbishop Claret agreed with her to come to Cuba to found with her new order. In 1855 she founded the Claretian Sisters; it was the first religious order founded in Cuba.

She died in Reus, Spain, at the age of 71. In 1993, she was declared venerable by Pope John Paul II.

The Claretian Missionaries can now be found in 27 countries. http://www.claretianasrmi.org
