= Claretian Sisters =

Catholic religious institute

The Claretian Sisters were founded in 1855 by María Antonia París (1813–1885) and Anthony Mary Claret. As of 2012, they were the third largest Catholic religious institute for women, with around 7,171 members.

== History ==
The Claretian Missionary Sisters were founded in Santiago de Cuba in 1855. In 1850 Sister María Antonia París, met Anthony Mary Claret and told him of her concept of a new religious institute. When Claret was appointed Archbishop of Santiago, he wrote her, inviting her to found her new congregation in Cuba. The new community opened schools for girls.

The patroness of the institute is Mary, under the title of the Immaculate Conception.

== Ministry of the Order ==
Christian formation of children, young people, and adults

social services

Hispanic and migrant ministry

liturgical ministry

formation of candidates to the priesthood

Youth and Vocational Ministry
