= History of Catholic theology =

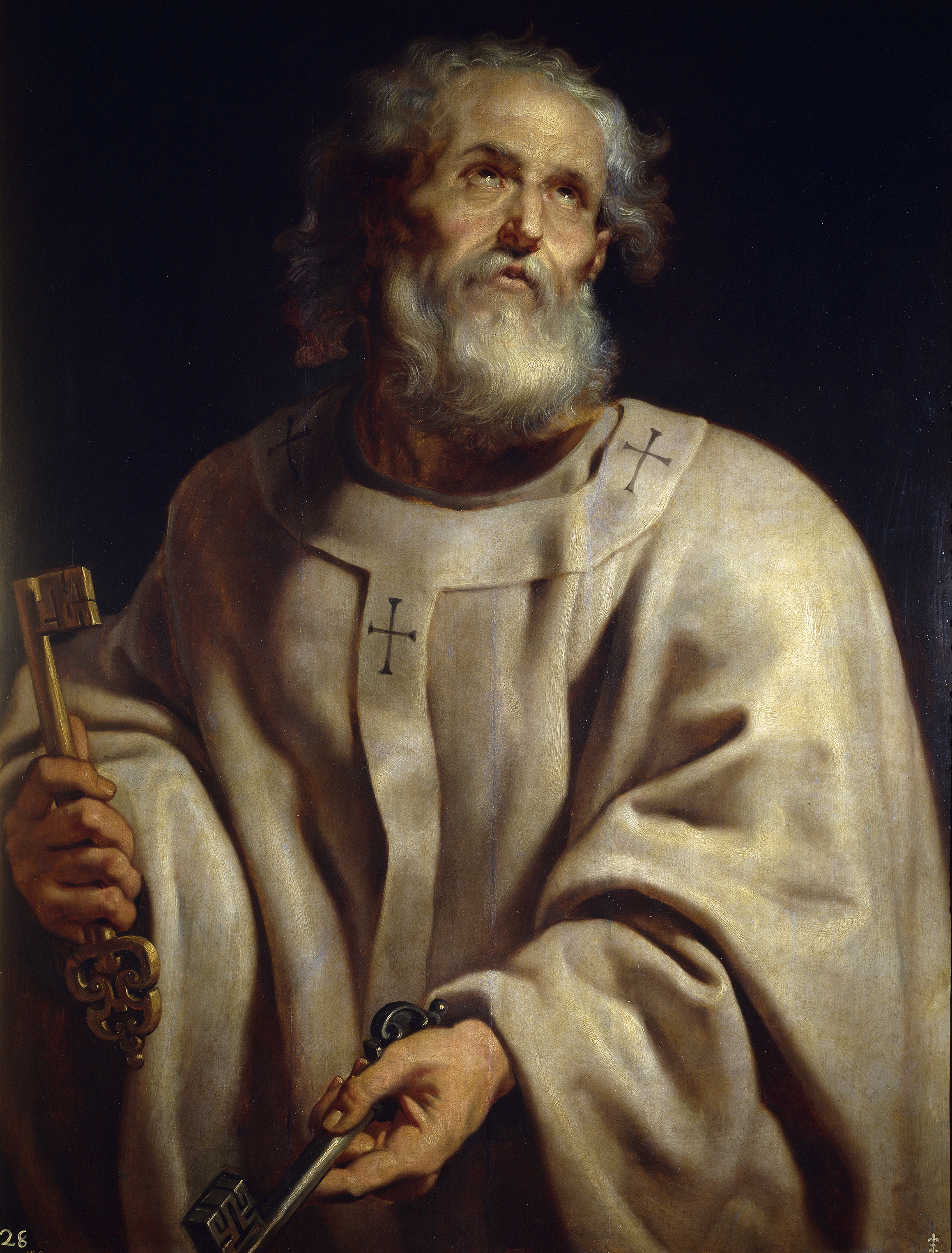
Saint Peter, the first pope in Catholicism, holding the Keys of Heaven, drawn by Peter Paul Rubens 1610 - 1612.

The history of Catholic theology, or the beliefs and teachings of the Catholic Church, began with 1st-century Judaism and the teachings of Jesus, who claimed to be the Jewish Messiah. These roots further developed in the period of Early Christianity, with the Church Fathers and Ecumenical councils outlining concepts such as the trinity. In the Middle Ages, Catholic theology was known as scholasticism. Following the Protestant Reformation in the 16th century, the Catholic Church launched the Counter-Reformation, which affirmed some aspects of Catholic theology while reforming or standardizing some traditions. Modern-day issues such as abortion, euthanasia, and birth control have been condemned since the Second Vatican Council in the 1960s.

== Origins ==
The Catholic Church believes that Catholicism originated from Jesus and his apostles. Christianity started off as a movement within Judaism that claimed that Jesus fulfilled the promise God made to Abraham, Isaac, and Jacob, known as The Patriarchs. The Gospel also sought to be a fulfillment and correction of the philosophies of Ancient Greek philosophy and Ancient Roman philosophy. Christian apologists from the second century, such as Justin Martyr, Theophilus, and Athenagoras also attempted to conciliate Greek philosophy. Jesus affirmed the God of Abraham, and the event of the Exodus.

The Gospels of Matthew and Luke state that Mary was a Virgin when she gave birth to Jesus, and that she was conceived by the Holy Spirit.

Jesus was referred to as the Christ, which is Greek for Messiah or anointed one. His followers believed that he was from the Davidic line and the Messiah in Judaism.

Matthew 16:18 of the New Testament records Jesus saying to Peter, one of the apostles:

And so I say to you, you are Peter, and upon this rock I will build my church, (Note: The New American Bible Revised Edition writes here: "16:18 You are Peter, and upon this rock I will build my church: the Aramaic word kēpā’ meaning rock and transliterated into Greek as Kēphas is the name by which Peter is called in the Pauline letters (1 Cor 1:12; 3:22; 9:5; 15:4; Gal 1:18; 2:9, 11, 14) except in Gal 2:7–8 (“Peter”). It is translated as Petros (“Peter”) in Jn 1:42. The presumed original Aramaic of Jesus’ statement would have been, in English, “You are the Rock (Kēpā’) and upon this rock (kēpā’) I will build my church.” The Greek text probably means the same, for the difference in gender between the masculine noun petros, the disciple’s new name, and the feminine noun petra (rock) may be due simply to the unsuitability of using a feminine noun as the proper name of a male. Although the two words were generally used with slightly different nuances, they were also used interchangeably with the same meaning, “rock.” Church: this word (Greek ekklēsia) occurs in the gospels only here and in Mt 18:17 (twice). There are several possibilities for an Aramaic original. Jesus’ church means the community that he will gather and that, like a building, will have Peter as its solid foundation. That function of Peter consists in his being witness to Jesus as the Messiah, the Son of the living God. The gates of the netherworld shall not prevail against it: the netherworld (Greek Hadēs, the abode of the dead) is conceived of as a walled city whose gates will not close in upon the church of Jesus, i.e., it will not be overcome by the power of death.") and the gates of the netherworld shall not prevail against it.

This, according to Catholic theology, made Peter the first pope.

Jesus taught of the Kingdom of God, and that you must accept him in order to enter it. He taught that devotion to God comes before everything else, including your family and yourself. He condemned hatred, lust, murder, adultery, and divorce.

Between 29 and 33 AD, Jesus was crucified. His followers then claimed that he rose from the dead.

== Early Christianity ==
=== Apostolic age ===
Prior to Paul's conversion from persecutor of the early church, aside from Peter the most prominent of the apostles was James, brother of Jesus. It was he that was head of the community and it was he that played the decisive role at the Council of Jerusalem, namely the composition of the letter that allowed Gentiles entrance to the nascent church. Paul the Apostle has occasionally been referred to as the first Christian theologian, due to his interpretation of the life and teachings of Jesus. He referred to Jesus as the Son of God, and that he died for our sins.

=== Apostolic succession ===
Catholic doctrine claims an unbroken line of papal succession from its first Bishop of Rome, Peter, who was succeeded by Linus, to the present incumbent, Pope Leo XIV.

=== Controversies ===
Divisions within the Church had always existed. During the first century of the Church, people were debating whether gentiles could become Christian. By the end of that century, debates occurred over this in Antioch where Ignatius was the Bishop. Others claimed that Jesus was not truly a human, but a spirit, and did not actually die. Ignatius countered this by stating that if he did not die, then the resurrection could not have happened. There were controversial movements such as Gnosticism that rose and threatened to split the Church. These movements were condemned by the Church Fathers, such as Irenaeus in his Against Heresies.

The Gnostics believed that there were two gods: one from the old testament, that is inferior, and a benevolent god that was shown through Christ. Irenaeus countered using both the Old Testament (Deuteronomy 5:8) and the New Testament (1 Corinthians 8:4), which state that there is only one God who created everything. He also compared Gnosticism to cherry-picking parts of the Iliad by Homer to create an entirely different message from the one intended. As an example, the Gnostics used the phrase "the God of this world" (Corinthians 4:4) as proof of the existence of a lesser god, when in fact, the phrase was talking about Satan.

=== Role of the Bible ===
Ignatius and Papias, among others, believed oral tradition was more important than the written books of the Bible. Papias wrote "information from the books would not help me as much as the word of a living and surviving voice". In the upcoming decades, as oral tradition became more difficult, the books started to get more widespread acceptance.

Texts in writing became important for Christianity. The eucharist started with reading from the gospels and the Septuagint, the Greek translation of the Old Testament. There was no unanimous consensus for the Biblical cannon back then. Decisions for what books to use were often made based on tradition: books that have been more common and been in use for longer periods of time became more likely to be featured. The process for deciding what books to use was gradual, and some books were questioned, such as 2 Peter, James, Revelation, and Hebrews.

=== Later ===
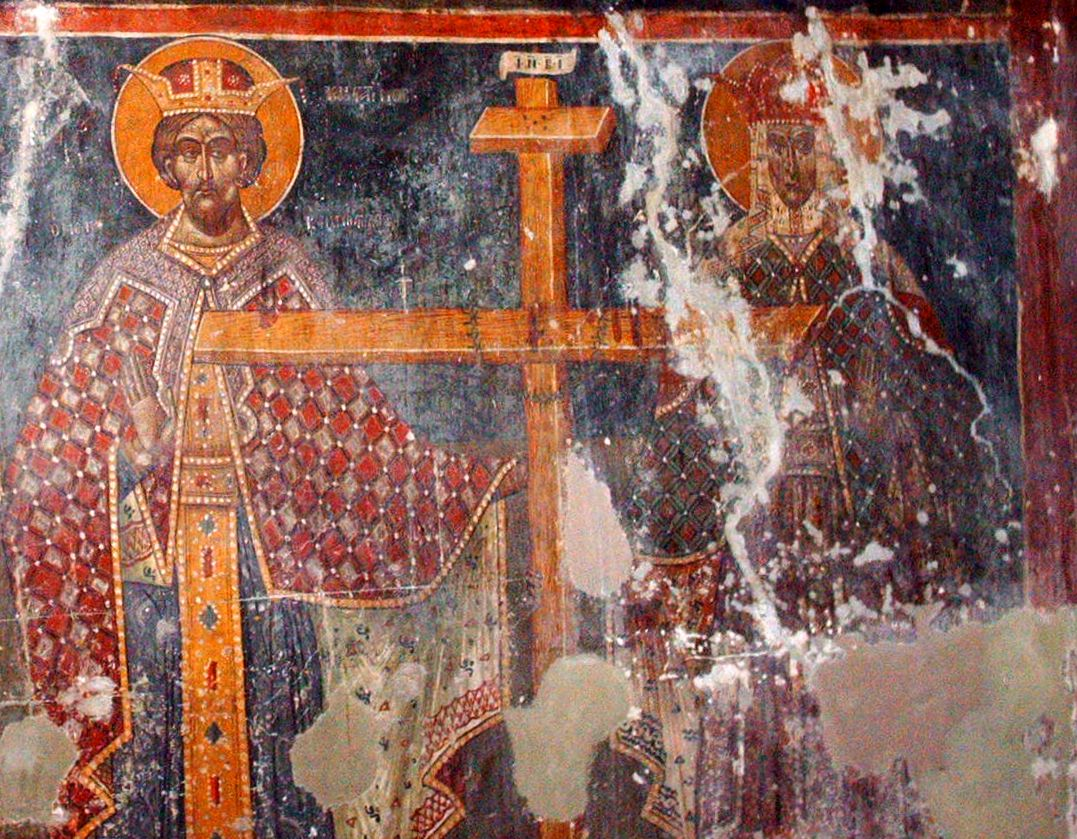
Constantine the Great the Roman Emperor and his mother with the holy cross of Jerusalem. Painted by Nikolla, son of Onufri at the second half of the 16th century.

Origen, a Church father, developed ideas that later became the concept of purgatory. He believed that parts of the Bible were metaphorical and not always literal. However, his teachings were condemned in the sixth century.

The first four ecumenical councils all focused on Christ, and things such as his relationship to the Father and the relationship between his humanity and divinity.

Constantine, the Roman Emperor who converted to Christianity in the 310s, summoned the First Council of Nicaea. . The council created the Nicene Creed, which states the following:

"We believe in one God, the Father, the Almighty, maker of heaven and earth. … We believe in One Lord, Jesus Christ, the only Son of God … of one Being with the Father … [who] was made man … he suffered death and … he rose again … and is seated at the right hand of the Father. … We believe in the Holy Spirit … the giver of life, who proceeds from the Father and the Son … who has spoken through the prophets."

== Late Antiquity ==
Augustine was a Christian theologian whose "distinctive theological style shaped Latin Christianity in a way surpassed only by Scripture itself." He often used the teachings of Plato, and modern Catholicism is heavily inspired by him. He defended predestination. Augustine taught that just as the trinity has three parts to it, love has three parts as well: the person that loves, the person that is being loved, and the act of love itself. He, along with Paul and Plato, believed a true philosopher is a lover of God, because true wisdom is the same as God. Augustine used this to explain that the true philosophy and the true religion are the same. He heavily criticized what he called "the philosophy of this world" -- referring to Paganism, stoicism, and Platonism; he accuses them of pride, of trying to cultivate happiness through their own merits, and for rejecting Jesus and Christianity. He also developed the concept of just war theory. Augustine's teachings were unanimously accepted, not just in Catholicism, but in all of Western Christianity, until the nineteenth century.

== Medieval scholasticism ==
The Scholastics combined Christian dogma, Augustinianism, and Aristotelianism. One of the most influential scholastics was Thomas Aquinas, who is recognized by the Catholic Church as the leading theologian. His most significant works are Summa theologica and Summa contra Gentiles, the former being a summary of theology.

The prevalence of torture and executions during this era has been exaggerated due to propaganda produced during the Renaissance and from figures such as Voltaire and Beccaria. Most criminals who were caught had received light and merciful punishment. Fines, short-term jail sentences, or exiles were far more likely to be given as a punishment than torture and execution.

Almost nobody in this time period, as well as before or after it, believed that the earth was flat.

== Modern ==
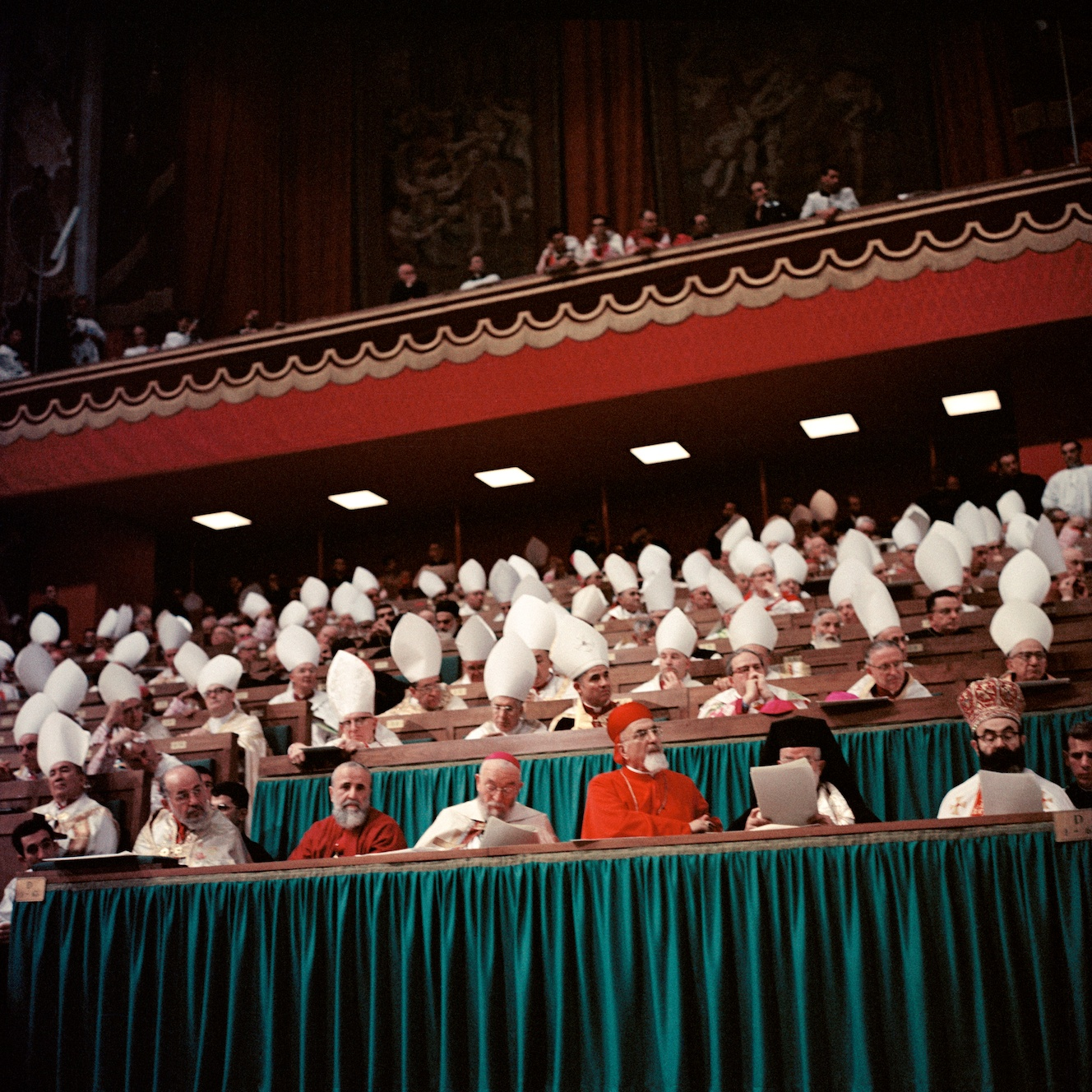
The Second Vatican Council, photographed by Lothar Wolleh (1930 - 1979).

Modern philosophers, starting from the Renaissance, often hated scholasticism. Hegel wrote that he would "put on seven-league boots" to skip the Middle Ages, and that he could "cry land like the sailor" when Descartes came along. However, during the Romantic era, people were very fond of scholasticism and the Middle Ages.

Catholics often combined science and theology. Galileo, Copernicus, Galvani, and Pasteur were all devout Catholics. John Heilbron stated that the Catholic Church arguably gave more financial aid to astronomy than all other institutions during the Middle Ages and the centuries after. No known scientist has ever been executed by the Catholic Church due to their scientific beliefs.

In the 16th and early 17th centuries, the Catholic Church launched the Counter-Reformation in opposition to the Protestant reformation. In response to criticisms from Protestants, the Catholic Church got rid of corruption and ambiguous areas in their theology.

The First Vatican Council took place under Pius IX from 1869 to 1870, and created the notion of papal infallibility.

The Second Vatican Council is one of the most important events in the history of Catholicism. It occurred in 1962 - 1965, and was announced by Pope John XXIII. This was the first group that women were allowed to attend. The council condemned abortion, euthanasia, and birth control. Pope Leo XIV, elected in 2025, affirmed the importance of this council.

Today, the Catholic Church opposes, abortion, euthanasia, surrogacy, sex change, and phenomena it deems as gender theory or gender ideology, while calling out dangers in poverty, migration, and human trafficking.. Catholicism supports the trinity, but that there is still notion that there is only one God, who is omnipotent, beyond the universe, and created human beings in his image, meaning that all human beings have a special relationship with him, and that Catholics should emphasize treating other human beings with love and forgiveness. It teaches that Jesus was both fully human and fully divine, and that after he had the Last Supper, that he was betrayed by Judas Iscariot, put on trial by the Sanhedrin for alleged blasphemy, was crucified under Pontius Pilate, rose from the dead, and ascended into heaven; signaling not just his strength, but that his disciples should not fear death. It teaches that after we die, we either go to purgatory followed by heaven, or that we go to Hell.

== See also ==
- History of the Catholic Church
- Catholic theology
