= Anthony Mary Claret =

Spanish archbishop (1807–1870)

Saint Anthony Mary Claret CMF
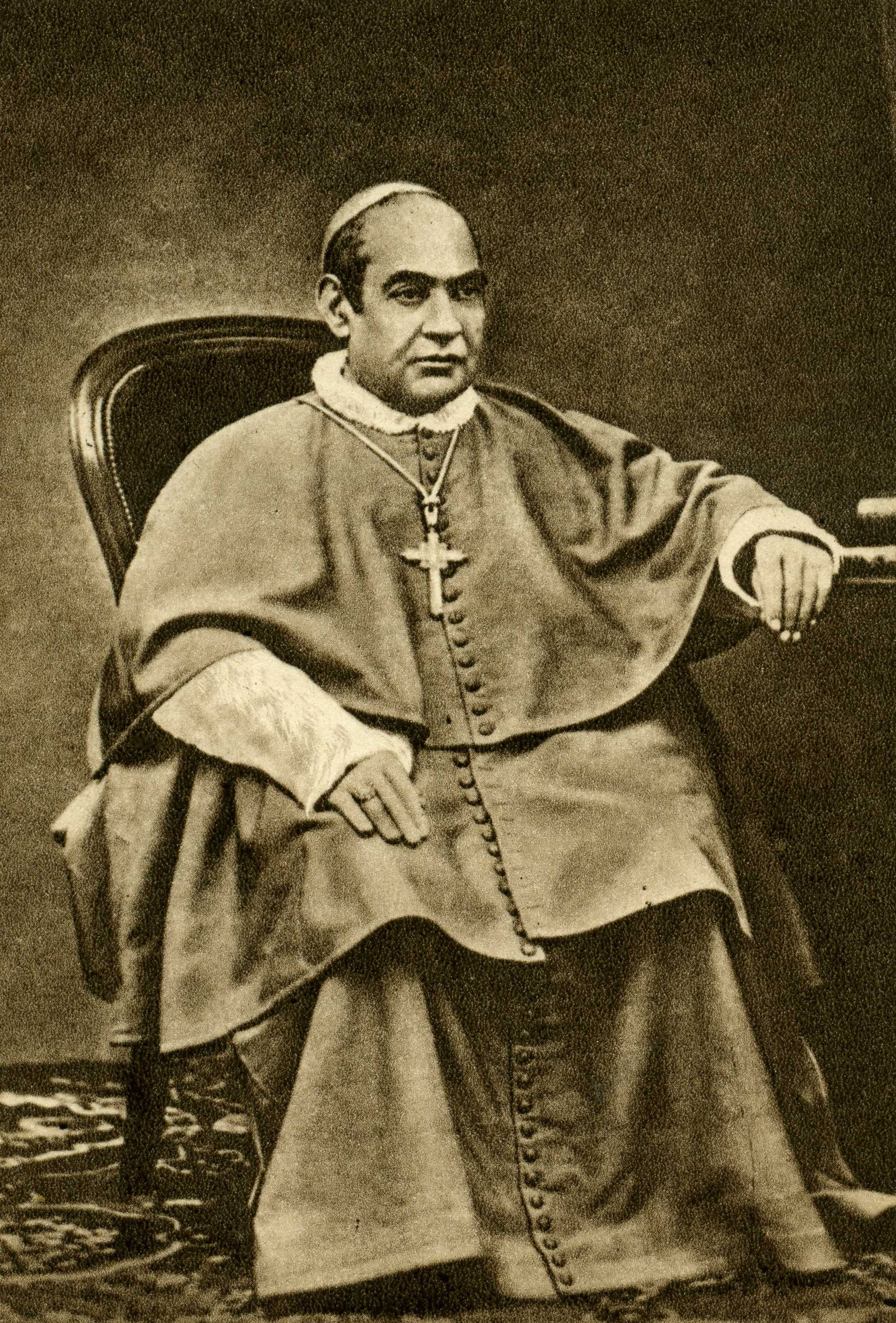
- Anthony Mary Claret photographed in 1860
- Born: Antoni Maria Claret i Clarà; 23 December 1807; Sallent, Barcelona, Spain
- Died: 24 October 1870 (aged 62); Fontfroide, Narbonne, France
- Beatified: 25 February 1934, Rome by Pope Pius XI
- Canonized: 7 May 1950, Rome by Pope Pius XII
- Feast: 24 October; 23 October (local calendars and pre-1970 General Roman Calendar)
- Attributes: Bishop's robe, crozier, an open book, catechism, 2 students beside him at his side and having his bent arm pointing to the sky
- Patronage: Textile merchants, weavers, savings (taught the poor the importance of savings), Catholic press, Claretians, Dioceses of the Canary Islands, Claretian students, Claretian educators and Claretian educational institutions, Foundations
- Coat of arms of Saint Anthony Mary Claret

Anthony Mary Claret, CMF (born Antoni Maria Claret i Clarà; (Note: In this Catalan name, the first or paternal surname is Claret and the second or maternal family name is Clarà; both are generally joined by the conjunction "i".) Spanish: Antonio María Claret y Clarà; 23 December 1807 – 24 October 1870) was a Spanish Catholic prelate and missionary who served as Archbishop of Santiago de Cuba and was the confessor of Queen Isabella II. He founded the congregation of Missionary Sons of the Immaculate Heart of Mary, commonly called the Claretians.

In addition to the Claretians, which in the early 21st century had over 450 houses and 3100 members, with missions in five continents, Claret founded or drew up the rules of several communities of religious sisters. Claret is the patron saint of weavers.

== Life ==
Antoni Maria Claret i Clarà was born in Sallent, in the county of Bages in the Province of Barcelona, on 23 December 1807, the fifth of the eleven children of Juan and Josefa Claret. His father was a wool manufacturer. As a child he enjoyed pilgrimages to the nearby Shrine of Our Lady of Fussimanya.

Claret received an elementary education in his native village, and at the age of twelve became a weaver. At the age of eighteen, he went to Barcelona to specialize in his trade as a Jacquard loom programmer, and remained there until he was 20 years old. Meanwhile, he devoted his spare time to study and became proficient in Latin, French and engraving.

Frightened that his love of active time and design was causing him to become obsessed and burned out, and feeling a call to religious life, he left Barcelona. Although he initially wished to become a Carthusian monk, he entered the diocesan seminary at Vic in 1829, and was ordained on 13 June 1835, on the feast of St. Anthony of Padua. He received a benefice in his native parish, where he continued to study theology until 1839; but as missionary work strongly appealed to him, he proceeded to Rome. There he entered the Jesuit novitiate but had to leave due to ill health. He then returned to Spain and exercised his pastoral ministry in Viladrau and Girona, attracting notice through his efforts on behalf of the poor.

Recalled by his superiors to Vic, Claret was sent as Apostolic Missionary throughout Catalonia which had suffered from French invasions. He travelled from one mission to the next on foot. An eloquent preacher fluent in the Catalan language, he drew people from miles around. After a lengthy time in the pulpit, he would spend long hours in the confessional. In 1848, Claret's life was threatened by anti-clericalists and he was sent to the Canary Islands where he gave retreats for 15 months. His missions were so well attended that he often preached from an improvised pulpit in the plaza before the church.

== Claretians ==
On his return to mainland Spain, he established the Congregation of the Missionary Sons of the Immaculate Heart of Mary (The Claretians) on 16 July 1849, the Feast of Our Lady of Mount Carmel, and founded the great religious library at Barcelona which was called "Librería Religiosa" (now "Librería Claret"). Pope Pius IX gave approval to the congregation on 22 December 1865.

== Archbishop ==
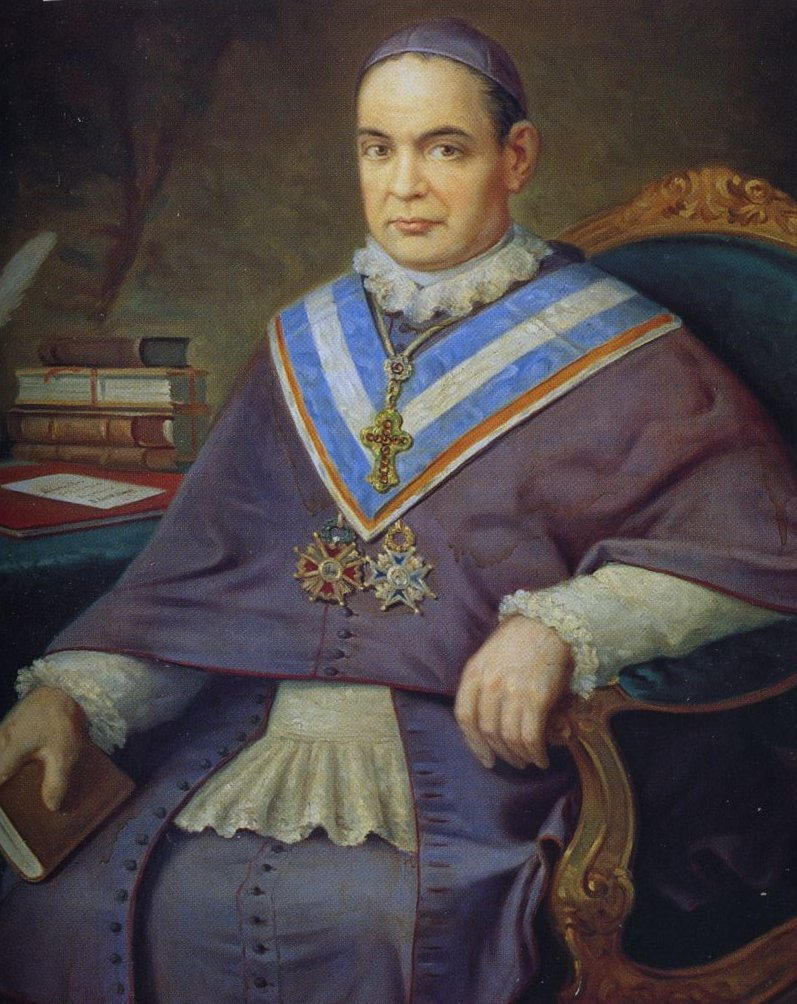
Portrait of Archbishop Anthony Mary Claret by Luis de Madrazo (Museum of Romanticism, Madrid)

Pope Pius IX, at the request of the Spanish crown (Queen-regnant Isabella II of Spain), appointed him Archbishop of Santiago de Cuba, in 1849. He was consecrated at Vic in October 1850. Before he embarked, he made three separate pilgrimages: to Our Lady of the Pillar, patroness of Spain; to the Virgin of Montserrat, patroness of Catalonia; and to Our Lady of Fussimanya, near his home village.

The Santiago seminary was reorganized, clerical discipline strengthened, and over 9,000 marriages validated within the first two years of his arrival. He erected a hospital and numerous schools. He made a visitation of the entire diocese three times, and gave local missions frequently. Among his initiatives were trade or vocational schools for disadvantaged children and credit unions for the use of the poor. He also wrote books about rural spirituality and agricultural methods, which he himself tested first. On 25 August 1855, he founded the Religious of Mary Immaculate together with Maria Antonia Paris, considered the first women religious institute in Cuba. His work stirred up opposition and at Holguín his cheek was stabbed by a would-be assassin. Claret obtained a commutation of the assailant's death sentence to a term in prison.

Claret was a charismatic preacher who could reportedly perform miracles. Among them were claims that his body would become transfigured while preaching or in prayer; that he would at times levitate up to six feet off the ground; that he stopped a series of earthquakes in Cuba by kneeling on the ground and placing his palms to the earth while uttering prayers; that he could calm storms by raising a hand to the sky and blessing the storm clouds; that he experienced apparitions of both Jesus and Mary; and that he seen walking on water. In addition, claims circulated that a supernatural light could be seen radiating from his body while he was saying Mass. Queen Isabella of Spain produced a written statement declaring that she had personally witnessed this phenomenon.

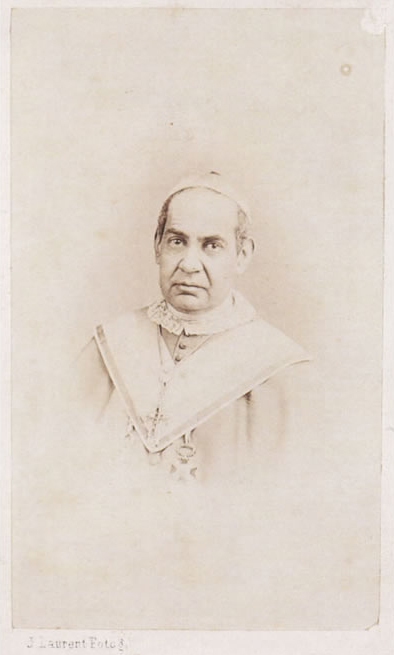
Photograph of Saint Anthony Mary Claret, c. 1862

In February 1857, Claret was recalled to Spain by Queen Isabella II, who made him her confessor. He obtained permission to resign his Cuban see and was appointed to the titular see of Trajanopolis. His influence was now directed solely to help the poor and to propagate learning; he lived frugally and took up his residence in an Italian hospice. For nine years he was rector of the Escorial monastic school, where he established a scientific laboratory, a museum of natural history, a library, college and schools of music and languages. In 1868, a new revolution dethroned the queen and sent her and her family into exile. Claret's life was also in danger, so he accompanied her to Paris. He stayed with them for a while, then went to Rome where he was received by Pope Pius IX.

He continued his popular missions and distribution of books wherever he went in accompanying the Spanish Court. When Isabella recognized the new, secular government of the Kingdom of Italy, he left the Court and hastened to take his place by the side of the Pope. At the latter's command, however, he returned to Madrid with faculties for absolving the queen from the censures she had incurred.

== Last years ==
In 1869 he went to Rome to prepare for the First Vatican Council. Owing to failing health he withdrew to Prada de Conflent in the French Pyrenees, where he was still harassed by his Spanish enemies; shortly afterwards he retired to the Cistercian abbey at Fontfroide, Narbonne, southern France, where he died on 24 October 1870, aged 62.

His remains were buried in the Catalan city of Vic, in the County of Osona.

== Works ==
Anthony Mary Claret wrote 144 books. His sermons and writings contributed to bringing about the revival of the Catalan language, although most of his works were published in Spanish, especially during his stay in Cuba and Madrid. Among his printed works are "Autobiography of Anthony Mary Claret", "La escala de Jacob"; "Máximas de moral la más pura"; "Avisos"; "Catecismo explicado con láminas"; "La llave de oro"; "Selectos panegíricos" (11 volumes); "Sermones de misión" (3 volumes); "Misión de la mujer"; "Vida de Sta. Mónica"; "La Virgen del Pilar y los Francmasones."

In addition to the Claretians, which in the early 21st century had over 450 houses and 3100 members, with missions in five continents, Archbishop Claret founded or drew up the rules of several communities of religious sisters.

== Veneration ==
Claret was declared venerable by Pope Leo XIII in 1899. His relics were transferred to the mission house at Vic in 1897, at which time his heart was found incorrupt. His grave is visited by many pilgrims.

Anthony Mary Claret was beatified in Rome by Pope Pius XI on 24 February 1934. He was canonized 16 years later by Pope Pius XII on 7 May 1950. Pope John XXIII included him in the General Roman Calendar in 1960, and fixed his feast on 23 October, where it remained for nine years until the 1969 revision of the calendar moved it to the day of his death, 24 October, which had been the feast of Saint Raphael the Archangel since 1921.

Anthony Mary Claret is the patron saint of weavers.

== Educational legacy ==
Many educational institutions ranging from kindergarten to undergraduate school are named after Claret and run by the Claretians in Europe, South America, Africa and Asia. They are located in Catalonia (Barcelona, Valls and Sabadell), rest of Spain (Madrid, Gran Canaria, Sevilla, and Valencia), Colombia (Cali), Dominican Republic (Santo Domingo), Peru (Trujillo, Huancayo, Arequipa and Lima), Argentina (Buenos Aires and Bahía Blanca), Venezuela (Caracas, Maracaibo and Mérida), Equatorial Guinea (Malabo), Chile (Temuco), Costa Rica (Heredia), the Philippines (Zamboanga City, Quezon City), India (Ziro), and Bangalore.

== In popular culture ==
He is portrayed by Antonio Reyes in the 2022 film Slaves and Kings, produced by the Claretians and Stellarum Films, and directed by Pablo Moreno. The film is a re-release of the 2020 film Claret.

== See also ==
- Claretians
- List of Catholic saints
