= Social teachings of the papacy =

Catholic social doctrine

Social teachings of the papacy encompass papal views described in social encyclicals and other papal communications, beginning with Rerum novarum, Pope Leo XIII's encyclical of 1891.

== History ==
=== Pre-Vatican II ===
Pope Leo XIII, amidst the Industrial Revolution and concerns about the deteriorating working and living conditions of urban workers, wrote the first social encyclical of modern times, Rerum novarum ("Of new things"), in 1891. He was influenced by German Bishop Wilhelm Emmanuel Freiherr von Ketteler. This encyclical set the tone for the Catholic Church's social teaching. It rejected socialism as well as laissez-faire capitalism, advocating the regulation of working conditions. It argued for the establishment of a living wage and for the right of workers to form trade unions.

Pope Pius XI carried the theme forward in 1931 in his encyclical Quadragesimo anno ("Forty years later"). Pius XI concentrated on the ethical implications of the social and economic order. He called for the reconstruction of the social order based on the principle of solidarity and subsidiarity. He noted major dangers for human freedom and dignity, arising from unrestrained capitalism and totalitarian communism.

Pope Pius XII wrote no encyclical on social matters, but touched on new questions arising for Church teaching, in medicine, psychology, sports, TV, science, law, and education.

=== Vatican II and after ===
Pope John XXIII in 1961, after calling the Second Vatican Council and on the 70th anniversary of Rerum Novarum, published the encyclical Mater et Magistra ("Mother and teacher") to encourage Christians to respect human dignity and the community of all peoples, with an emphasis on the fact that economic conditions that place profit over human welfare fail to respect human dignity. A special focus was given to people leaving the farming sector where the standard of living was far below that in the cities. The Food and Agriculture Organization is acclaimed for its work in improvement of agriculture and in developing international collaboration. Food surplus should be shared with nations in need and help given toward improvement of farming methods, but always with respect for the local culture and control. The word "balance" occurs 16 times in the encyclical as the Pope encourages governments to work for the common good and a reduction in inequalities. On the eve of Vatican II new challenges are mentioned: the age of space and of telecommunications and the passage from colonialism to neocolonialism.

Pope Paul VI began with an apostolic letter (Octogesima adveniens) on "arriving at the eightieth" year after Rerum Novarum. It reflects on the growing disparities between industrialized nations and those "struggling against starvation" and "engaged in eliminating illiteracy". It recalls John XXIII's statement decrying the discrepancies between urban and rural life, along with the squalid conditions that awaited those who moved to the cities. It introduces the topic of ecology to Catholic social teaching with the statement that by man's "ill-considered exploitation of nature he risks destroying it and becoming in his turn the victim of this degradation". Then in his 1967 encyclical Populorum progressio ("On the development of peoples") he emphasizes that "lay people must consider it their task to improve the temporal order". He calls out the tyranny that comes from "unbridled liberalism" and from a type of capitalism with "pernicious economic concepts" that leads to "fratricidal conflicts" amidst the accumulation of superfluous wealth. He goes on to comment that "haughty pride in one's own nation disunites nations and poses obstacles to their true welfare". He gives his closing comments a title that would echo over the years: "Development, the New Name for Peace" .

Pope John Paul II in 1981 on the 90th anniversary of Rerum novarum produced Laborem exercens ("Through work"). Reflecting on increasing mechanization, with workers like cogs in the employer's machine, he cites proposals like joint ownership and profit-sharing for the more personal involvement of the worker. He speaks of companies and states as "indirect employers", where workers are dependent on the prices paid for primary products and where the policies of governments should protect the livelihood of workers. Then in 1991 Centesimus annus honored the "Hundredth year" of Leo's encyclical. It criticizes Marxist ideology as atheistic and declares that "exploitation, at least in the forms analyzed and described by Karl Marx, has been overcome in Western society" (41). It also warns about the excesses of capitalism, pointing out that "it is the task of the State to provide for the defence and preservation of common goods such as the natural and human environments, which cannot be safeguarded simply by market forces.... Now, with the new capitalism, the State and all of society have the duty of defending those collective goods which, among others, constitute the essential framework for the legitimate pursuit of personal goals on the part of each individual".

Pope Benedict XVI in 2009 produced the encyclical Caritas in Veritate ("Charity in Truth") in which he argued that love and truth are essential in our response to global development and to progress towards the common good. He explains the moral principles necessary for all the diverse actors in addressing the problems of hunger, the environment, migration, sexual tourism, bioethics, cultural relativism, social solidarity, energy, and population growth. He first reiterates major points made by Paul VI in Populorum Progressio. He then describes globalization (mentioned 21 times) as the major feature of the current time, along with wealth (14 times), its generation and distribution within nations and among nations.

Eight months after his election Pope Francis wrote the Apostolic Letter Evangelii gaudium ("Joy of the Gospel") which was "the programmatic text of the Church today and represents the vision that Pope Francis has given for the years to come". He described "trickle-down theories... [as expressing] a crude and naïve trust in the goodness of those wielding economic power" and leading to a "globalization of indifference". In 2015, he produced his encyclical Laudato si' ("Praise be to you") with subtitle "On care for our common home." Francis gives all of Chapter Three to "The Human Roots of the Ecological Crisis." The encyclical critiques development (61 times) that is not sustainable (21 times), integral (25 times), and shared (11 times). He criticizes our throwaway culture (5 times) and consumerism (15 times) and calls the warming of the planet a symptom of a greater problem: the developed world's indifference (7 times) to the destruction of the planet "to produce short-term growth" (178). Most of the encyclical's 172 references are to Catholic church sources and its comments on climate change are consistent with the scientific consensus. Francis calls for people of the world to take "swift and unified global action".
