= Caritas =

Caritas may refer to:

- The Latin term for charity, one of the three theological virtues

== Religion ==
- Caritas Internationalis, a confederation of more than 160 Catholic relief, development and social service organisations: The links to the articles of the different organisations named "Caritas" can be found here.
- Deus caritas est, the first encyclical of Pope Benedict XVI.
- Caritas in Veritate, the third encyclical of Pope Benedict XVI; his first on social justice issues

== Education ==
- Caritas Academy, an all-girls private, Catholic high school in Jersey City, New Jersey
- Caritas Institute of Community Education, an institute of higher education

== Health care ==
- Caritas Christi Health Care, a non-profit Catholic healthcare system in the New England region of the United States
- Caritas Hospital, a hospital located in Kottayam district, Kerala, India

== Other ==
- Caritas (yacht), a private yacht
- Las Caritas, a collection of Indian inscriptions in a rock formation in the Dominican Republic
- Caritas, a bar in the U.S. television series Angel (1999 TV series)
- Caritas (Ponzi scheme), a pyramid investment in the early 1990s in Cluj-Napoca, Romania
- Caritas Well or Caritas Fountain, a Renaissance fountain in Copenhagen, Denmark

== See also ==
- Carità (disambiguation)
- Charites, a group of minor goddesses in Greek mythology
- Deus caritas est (disambiguation)
- "Ubi caritas", a hymn of the Western Church associated with Maundy Thursday
- "O Caritas", a song on the Cat Stevens album Catch Bull at Four
