= Johannes Schasching =

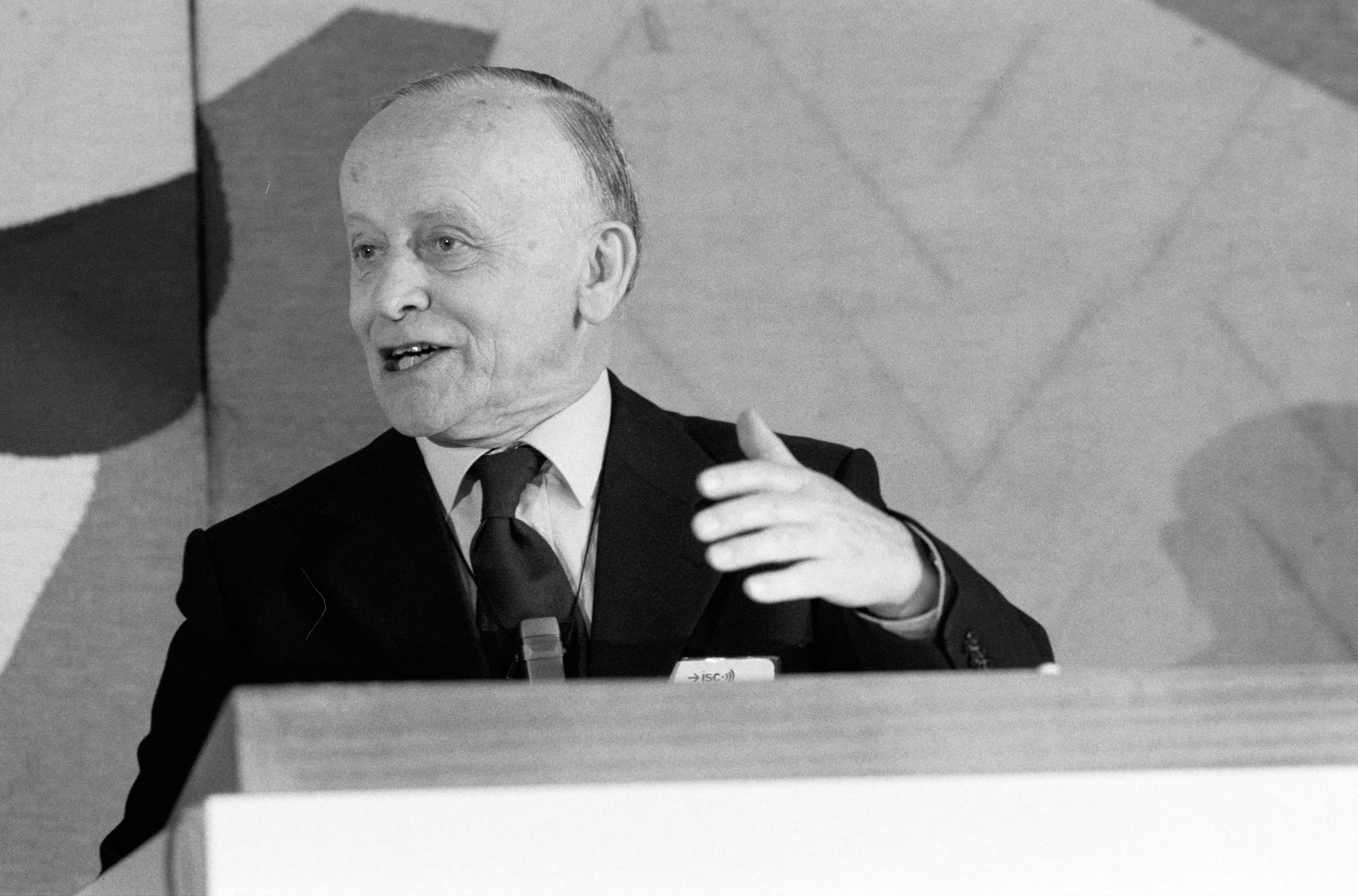
Image of Johannes Schasching

John Schasching SJ (10 March 1917 in St. Roman, Upper Austria, † 20 September 2013 in Vienna) was an Austrian Jesuit, university lecturer in social ethics, and author.

He was regarded as a leading exponent of Catholic social teaching in Austria and next to Oswald von Nell-Breuning and Johannes Messeniusr as one of the leading authorities on social teaching in German-speaking countries.

== Life ==
Johannes Schasching was born in 1917 in St. Roman in the Innviertel, the son of a bricklayer. As a student he had attended the Jesuit gymnasium in Freinberg in Linz and joined the Society of Jesus after graduation in 1937. During philosophy studies at the College of John Berchmans in Pullach, he was drafted into the Wehrmacht, but was released in 1941. He completed his studies in philosophy in 1943. From 1943 to 1947 he studied theology in Innsbruck, Munich, Vienna, Chicago, New York and Leuven. On 25 July 1946 in Innsbruck he was ordained a priest, and continued studies there for a doctorate in political science.

He began teaching theology in 1950. He initially taught ethics and social sciences at the University of Innsbruck. In 1952 he habilitated there in special ethics and sociology and taught in Innsbruck until 1961. From 1961 to 1966 he served as Provincial of the Jesuits in Austria.

In 1966 he was called to Rome by the Jesuit Father General Pedro Arrupe, where he taught social sciences at the Pontifical Gregorian University until 1991. From 1966 to 1969 he was also rector of the Pontifical Germanic and Hungarian College. Pontificium Collegium Germanicum et Hungaricum de Urbe. From 1982 to 1989 he was Dean of the Faculty of Social Sciences at the Greg.

After his retirement in 1991, he worked until 2005 at the Catholic Social Academy of Austria. While there he was heavily involved in the social pastoral letter of the Catholic bishops in 1990 and in the steering group of the Ecumenical Social Word (2003).

He lived with the Jesuit community in Vienna from 1991 until 2009 when he moved to a nursing home of the Borromäerinnen in Vienna. Here he died in September 2013 in his 97th year, and 77th year of his religious life. On 1 October 2013 Schasching was buried in the crypt of the Jesuit Church in Vienna.

== Legacy ==
In his work Schasching was always focused on the social welfare of the people and brought Catholic social teaching to ordinary believers. He also dealt with issues of man and society, church and society, and the church and the worker.

Schasching was a consultant for various papal institutions of the Roman Curia and official social adviser of Pope John Paul II. Many of his ideas and theological insights were incorporated into the social encyclicals "Laborem exercens" (1981), "Sollicitudo rei socialis" (1987), and "Centesimus annus"(1991).

Paul Zulehner was among his pupils.

In 2017, the Johannes Schasching Institute was founded at the Catholic Private University of Linz, which treats on his work and influence on Catholic social doctrine; while preserving and publishing his works.

== Awards ==
- 1973: Grand Cross of Merit of the Order of Merit of the Federal Republic of Germany
- 1987: Grand Golden Medal for services to the Republic of Austria
- 1988: honorary doctorate dr. rer.soc.oec. of the social and economic faculty of the Johannes Kepler University Linz
- 1995: Honorary Doctorate Dr. theol. the theological faculty of the University of Vienna
- 2000: Honorary Doctorate Dr. theol. the Catholic Theological College Linz
- 2002: Erwin Wenzl Prize

== Works ==
- Pastoral care, people and state, 1956
- Concerned for development and peace, 1988
- Traveling with the people, 1991
- For a Culture of Solidarity, Family and Catholic Social Teaching, 1991
- Timely-time, 1994
