= Social mortgage =

Conditions under which people are to use the goods of the world, in Catholicism

Social mortgage (Latin: pignus sociale) is a term used in Catholic social teaching. According to this body of thought, the social mortgage refers to the conditions under which people are to use the goods of the world, which as part of God's creation are intended for everyone. Use of the world's resources is bound up with responsibility towards the rest of humanity.

== Description ==
Although there is a right to private property, this is not an absolute right; in particular, no one has the right to accumulate large amounts of private property while others in the world lack the basic requirements for survival and development. This is embodied most fully in Pope John Paul II's encyclical Laborem exercens, when he states that "Christian tradition has never upheld" the "right to ownership or property"

as absolute and untouchable. On the contrary, it has always understood this right within the broader context of the right common to all to use the goods of the whole of creation: The right to private property is subordinated to the right to common use, to the fact that goods are meant for everyone.

Pope John Paul II was the first to coin this term "social mortgage" (pignus sociale) in his encyclical, Sollicitudo rei socialis. He explains that the term has principally a social function, and this is based on the universal destination of all goods. The goods that are accumulated are not meant to be reserved or hoarded, but are "meant for all". Pope Francis refers to the term and his predecessor's teaching in his own 2015 encyclical letter, Laudato si'.
