= Choosing the Common Good =

2010 British Catholic document

- Author: Catholic Bishops' Conference of England and Wales
- Language: English
- Subject: Social teaching
- Publisher: Alive Publishing
- Publication date: 2010
- Publication place: England
- Media type: Print Paperback
- Pages: 20

Choosing the Common Good is a 2010 document issued by the Catholic Bishops' Conference of England and Wales, clarifying the principles of Catholic social teaching.

The document was issued in the run up to the UK 2010 General Election. As well as explaining social teaching about the Common Good, it also focused upon the need to rebuild trust after the 2008 financial crisis and political expense scandals.

The document is a follow-up to bishops' 1996 document, The Common Good and the Catholic Church's Social Teaching, which was issued prior to the 1997 United Kingdom general election. This document provides updates, taking into account recent Papal encyclicals such as Pope Benedict XVI's Caritas in veritate.

== Purpose of the document ==
Archbishop Vincent Nichols identified the purpose of the document as a contribution to the issues of the moment. "... It proposes that without a wider debate about a shared vision for our society, the electioneering may well be confined to bitter arguments over issues of particular policy. We need a more wide-ranging debate about the values and vision which can underpin all our joint effort today.

== What is the Common Good ==
The "common good" refers to that which belongs to everyone in virtue of their common humanity "the sum total of social conditions which allow people, either as groups or as individuals, to reach their fulfilment more fully and more easily"

The common good is explained as not a generalised best possible for a society, where the average can be pulled up by some individuals doing particularly well. Instead, it is a matter of human flourishing, such that "if anyone has been left out and deprived of what is essential, then the common good has been betrayed."

== Integral human development ==
Integral human development is explained as the fulfilment of human flourishing, which the common good advocates. It requires lifting people from "every form of poverty, from hunger to illiteracy; it requires the opportunities for education, creating a vision of true partnership and solidarity between peoples; it calls for active participation in economic and political processes and it recognises that every human person is a spiritual being"

== Rebuilding trust ==
The bishops' call for a rebuilding of trust follows a series of national and international financial scandals. One of the major factors leading to the scandals is identified as a problem of selfishness and self-interest. The document makes the case that focusing upon the common good contributes to remedying the problems which afflicted banking and politicians; and retaining that focus helps to avoid future problems arising again.

== The call to virtue ==
Rebuilding trust and working to achieve the common good cannot be just a matter of rule following. It is instead a matter of changing hearts and minds so that people develop the characters of virtue which will help them to make the right choices, consistently and comprehensively; regardless of whether people are looking at them. By focusing upon the traditional cardinal virtues of Prudence, Justice, Temperance and Fortitude people are transformed and society is renewed in a way that mere compliance and regulation can never achieve. The bishops state: "Our society will rediscover its capacity to trust by the recovery of the practice of virtue, and through an ethically founded reform of many of our social and economic institutions. This will itself begin to restore the economy to a path that is both sustainable and just".

== Key principles ==
- Solidarity: acknowledges that all are responsible for all, not only as individuals but collectively at every level (p. 8)
- Common good: as the purpose and meaning of human society (p. 8)
- Integral Human Development: as a vision of what it means for individuals to flourish (p. 9)
- Pursuit of virtue as a more effective way of building society than mere regulation (p. 12)
- Value of Life from conception to natural death (p. 14)
- Reducing poverty and inequality (p. 14)
- Migration and Community relations (p. 15)
- The Global Community and Ecology (p. 16)
- Family and marriage (p. 17)
- The role of faith communities (p. 18)

== Conclusion ==
Focusing upon the principles of social teaching does not eradicate the need for discussion, nor the fact of inevitable disagreement. There will always be legitimate discussion about how to apply the principles, but a first step towards building a better society is to ensure that we are at least clear about what the principles are, upon which that society will be built. Contributing to establishing that clarification is the purpose of Choosing the Common Good.

== Reception ==
National Media in England picked up on specific themes from the document. The BBC focused on the bishops' diagnosis of a core problem of "lack of trust". Other commentators claimed that the bishops were suggesting that "over-regulation" was undermining community spirit Some commentators viewed the bishops' document as indirect covert support for the Conservative Party's support of marriage, after their 1996 document was seen as supporting the Labour Party before the 1997 general election.

The head of the Catholic Church in England, Archbishop Vincent Nichols, expressed pleasant surprise when the prime minister, David Cameron, seemed to echo the call to focus on the common good.
