= Centesimus Annus Pro Pontifice =

Encyclical by Pope John Paul II. (1991)

Centesimus Annus Pro Pontifice (CAPP) (it: Fondazione Centesimus Annus – Pro Pontifice) is a pontifical foundation.

Pope John Paul II established the "Fondazione Centesimus Annus - Pro Pontifice" on 13 June 1993 along with lay Catholic business, academic and professional leaders. The Foundation is a lay-led non-profit organisation. Its purpose is to promote Catholic social doctrine, especially as expressed in the encyclical Centesimus Annus (1991) and the aims of the Apostolic See. It is headquartered in Vatican City.

== Economy and Society International Prize ==
Beginning in 2013, every two years the foundation has bestowed the Economy and Society International Prize on a "work which stands out for its original contribution to in depth study and implementation of the Social Doctrine of the Church". Recipients have been:

- 2013: Julio Luis Martínez Martínez (2007). Ciudadanía, migraciones y religión. Un diálogo ético desde la fe cristiana (in Spanish). Madrid, San Pablo. and Stefano Zamagni (2007). L'economia del bene comune (in Italian). Rome: Città Nuova.
- 2015: Pierre de Lauzun (2013). Finance: un regard Chrétien. De la banque médiévale à la mondialisation financière (in French). Embrasure.
- 2017: Markus Vogt (2009). Prinzip Nachhaltigkeit: Ein Entwurf aus theologisch-ethischer Perspektive (in German) (third ed.). Munich: oeKom verlag.
- 2019: Mary L. Hirschfeld (2018). Aquinas and the Market, Towards a Humane Economy. Harvard University Press.
- 2021: Patrick Riordan (2017). Recovering Common Goods. Veritas. and Jaime Tatay (2015). Ecología integral. La recepción católica del reto de la sostenibilidad (in Spanish). BAC.
