= Universal destination of goods =

Views of the Catholic Church on the commons and property

The universal destination of goods is a concept in Catholic theology, by which the Catholic Church professes that the goods of creation are destined for mankind as a whole, but also recognizes the individual right to private property.

== Teaching ==
The Catechism of the Catholic Church says:

2403 The right to private property, acquired or received in a just way, does not do away with the original gift of the earth to the whole of mankind. The universal destination of goods remains primordial, even if the promotion of the common good requires respect for the right to private property and its exercise [...]
2405 Goods of production – material or immaterial – such as land, factories, practical or artistic skills, oblige their possessors to employ them in ways that will benefit the greatest number. Those who hold goods for use and consumption should use them with moderation, reserving the better part for guests, for the sick and the poor.

In 1967, Pope Paul VI wrote in the encyclical Populorum progressio:

Everyone knows that the Fathers of the Church laid down the duty of the rich toward the poor in no uncertain terms. As St. Ambrose put it: "You are not making a gift of what is yours to the poor man, but you are giving him back what is his. You have been appropriating things that are meant to be for the common use of everyone. The earth belongs to everyone, not to the rich."

The Compendium of the Social Doctrine of the Church states:

177. Christian tradition has never recognized the right to private property as absolute and untouchable: "On the contrary, it has always understood this right within the broader context of the right common to all to use the goods of the whole of creation: the right to private property is subordinated to the right to common use, to the fact that goods are meant for everyone". The principle of the universal destination of goods is an affirmation both of God's full and perennial lordship over every reality and of the requirement that the goods of creation remain ever destined to the development of the whole person and of all humanity. This principle is not opposed to the right to private property but indicates the need to regulate it. Private property, in fact, regardless of the concrete forms of the regulations and juridical norms relative to it, is in its essence only an instrument for respecting the principle of the universal destination of goods; in the final analysis, therefore, it is not an end but a means.

— Ch. III. THE UNIVERSAL DESTINATION OF GOODS, §b. The universal destination of goods and private property

Pope Francis included commentaries on this concept in his 2015 encyclical letter, Laudato si', where he refers to "the common destination of goods", and in his 2020 encyclical, Fratelli tutti.

== Notable uses of the term ==
Thomas Banchoff of Georgetown University in the USA noted in an article in The Tablet in September 2023 that, since the 1891 publication of Leo XIII's Rerum Novarum, "Catholic Social Teaching has been organised around core principles including human dignity, the common good, subsidiarity and the universal destination of goods".

== See also ==
- Catholic social teaching
- Fratelli tutti § Private property
- Lockean proviso
