= Hogar de Cristo, Guayaquil =

Coordinates: 2°7′2.63″S 79°58′53.01″W

Hogar de Cristo, Ecuador
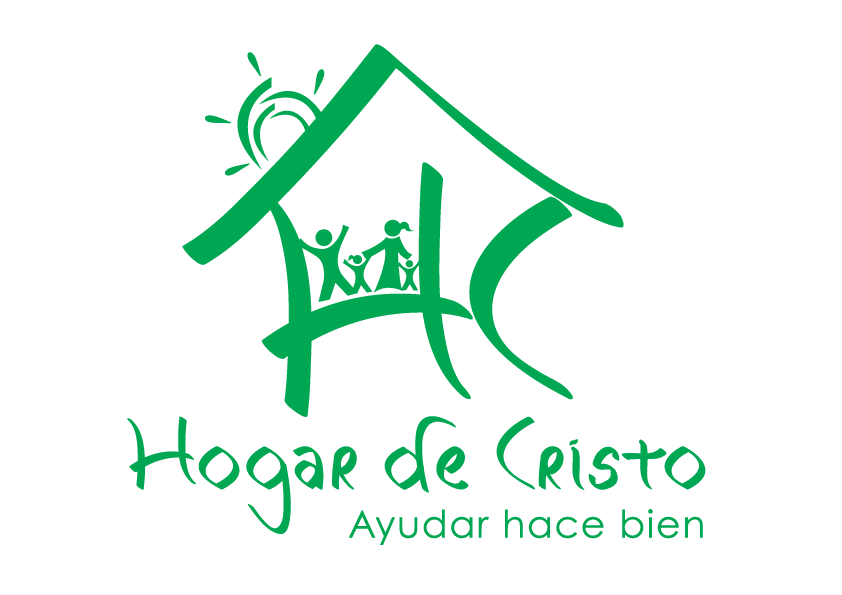
- Established: 1971; 55 years ago
- Purpose: Homebuilding with the poor along with other services
- Headquarters: Mount Sinai, Guayaquil, Ecuador
- Director: Eduardo Vega, S.J.
- Workers: 47
- Affiliations: Jesuit, Catholic
- Website: hogardecristo.org.ec

Hogar de Cristo, Guayaquil, "Home of Christ" – HC, was founded by the Jesuits in 1971 in response to a critical shortage of housing in Guayaquil, Ecuador, and in accord with the preferential option for the poor which spread in the Catholic Church after the Second Vatican Council of Bishops in the 1960s.

While HC continues to prefabricate homes, its activities have extended to supplying community facilities, education and worker training, health care, microcredit, and special services for abused women and children.

== History ==
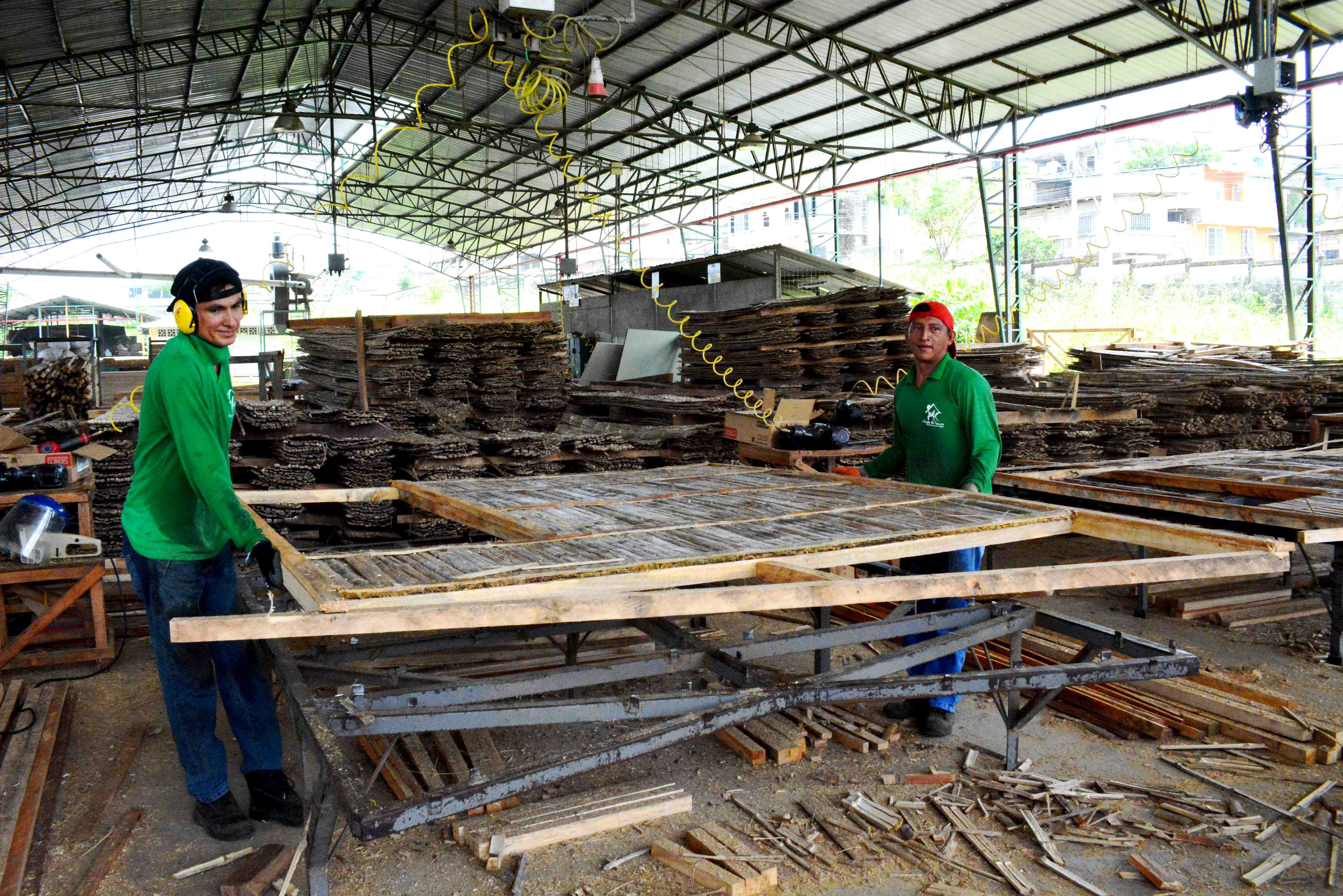
Hogar de Cristo Works

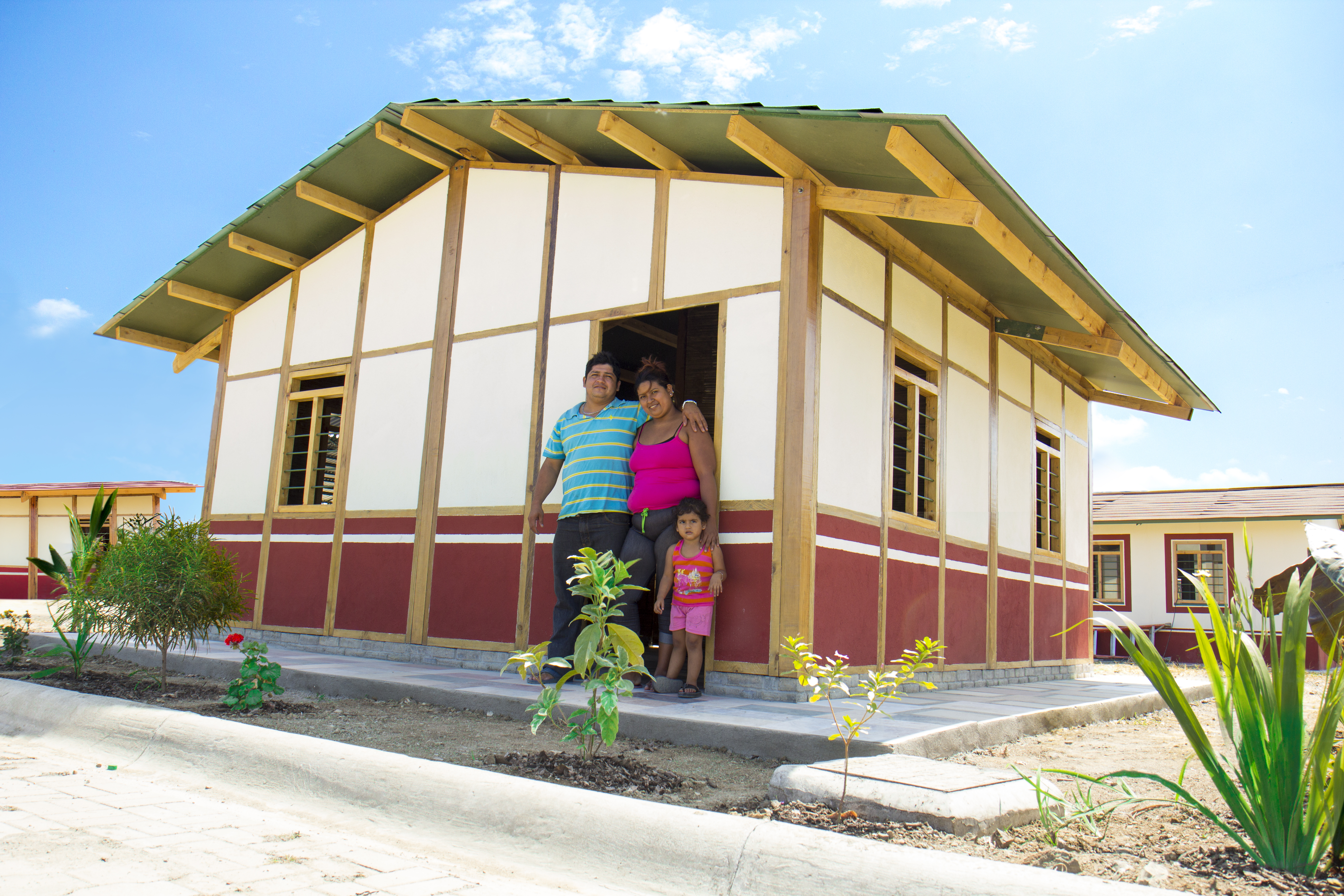
Alternative family housing

Hogar de Cristo was founded in 1971 by Ecuadoran Francisco García and Chilean Josse Van der Rest, priests of the Society of Jesus. They were inspired by a similar work founded by Jesuit Alberto Hurtado in Chile in 1944, and were responding to an unusually large need for housing in Guayaquil. By 1996, Hogar de Cristo received the UN's World Habitat Award, for producing cheap 100,000 homes made from prefabricated bamboo panels. In 2008 a grant of 200,000 euros from the Basque government in Spain subsidized the construction of a third plant, in Quevedo, Ecuador.
