= Octogesima adveniens =

Octogesima Adveniens Latin for 'The eightieth anniversary' Letter of Pope Paul VI
- Signature date: 14 May 1971
- Subject: Catholic social teaching
- Text: In Latin; In English

Octogesima adveniens (The eightieth anniversary) is the incipit of the 14 May 1971 Apostolic Letter addressed by Pope Paul VI to Cardinal Maurice Roy, president of the Pontifical Council for the Laity and of the Pontifical Council for Justice and Peace, on the occasion of the eightieth anniversary of Pope Leo XIII's encyclical Rerum novarum. Generally known as A Call to Action on the Eightieth Anniversary of Rerum novarum, the letter discusses themes concerned with securing democratic foundations in society.

== Content ==
Octogesima adveniens commemorates the eightieth anniversary of Rerum novarum. Pope Paul discusses the role of individual Christians and local churches in responding to situations of injustices. In this he follows Pius XI, who issued an encyclical letter, Quadragesimo anno (Forty years), in 1931. Pope John Paul II would do likewise in his 1991 Centesimus annus ("the hundredth year").

Flagrant inequalities exist in the economic, cultural and political development of the nations: while some regions are heavily industrialized, others are still at the agricultural stage; while some countries enjoy prosperity, others are struggling against starvation; while some peoples have a high standard of culture, others are still engaged in eliminating illiteracy.

Sections 8 through 21 address particular social concerns, most especially the effect of increased urbanization: "Is sufficient attention being devoted to the arrangement and improvement of the life of the country people, whose inferior and at times miserable economic situation provokes the flight to the unhappy crowded conditions of the city outskirts, where neither employment nor housing awaits them?"

== The call to action ==
In his 1967 encyclical, Populorum progressio ("On the Development of Peoples"), Pope Paul said that "... lay people must consider it their task to improve the temporal order. While the hierarchy has the role of teaching and authoritatively interpreting the moral laws and precepts that apply in this matter, the laity have the duty of using their own initiative and taking action in this area - without waiting passively for directives and precepts from others." He reiterates this in Octogesima adveniens: "Let each one examine himself, to see what he has done up to now, and what he ought to do. It is not enough to recall principles, state intentions, point to crying injustice and utter prophetic denunciations; these words will lack real weight unless they are accompanied for each individual by a livelier awareness of personal responsibility and by effective action."

The Pope noted that socialism may seem to have much in common with Christian belief and it is easy to idealise it as "a will for justice, solidarity and equality", but, he said that it would be "illusory and dangerous" to accept Marxist analysis "while failing to note the kind of totalitarian and violent society to which this process leads".

The letter is one of the first magisterial documents explicitly to mention the topic of the preservation of environment. Emphasising the ecclesial doctrine to which the goods of the Earth are dedicated to all people (no. 43), the letter criticizes modern practices of exploiting nature. Each property, including the gifts of nature, stands under the principle of the common use (usus communis), from which no human being must be excluded. Unlike Leo XIII’s encyclical Rerum novarum, Paul VI extends this postulate also on the natural environment and stresses the responsibility for future generations,
