= Deus caritas est (disambiguation) =

Deus caritas est (Latin: God is charity, God is love) may refer to:

- 1 John (Vulgate), English translation "God is love"
- Deus caritas est, a 2006 papal encyclical by Pope Benedict XVI
- God is Love (disambiguation)
