= Profit motive =

Motivation for businesses to maximize profits

In economics, the profit motive is the motivation of firms that operate so as to maximize their profits. Mainstream microeconomic theory posits that the ultimate goal of a business is "to make money" - not in the sense of increasing the firm's stock of means of payment (which is usually kept to a necessary minimum because means of payment incur costs, i.e. interest or foregone yields), but in the sense of "increasing net worth". Stated differently, the reason for a business's existence is to turn a profit. The profit motive is a key tenet of rational choice theory, or the theory that economic agents tend to pursue what is in their own best interests. In accordance with this doctrine, businesses seek to benefit themselves and/or their shareholders by maximizing profits.

== Economics ==
Theoretically, when an economy is fully competitive (i.e. has no market imperfections like externalities, monopolies, information or power imbalances etc), the profit motive ensures that resources are being allocated efficiently. For instance, Austrian economist Henry Hazlitt explains, “If there is no profit in making an article, it is a sign that the labor and capital devoted to its production are misdirected: the value of the resources that must be used up in making the article is greater than the value of the article itself." In other words, profits let companies know whether an item is worth producing. Theoretically in free and competitive markets, if an individual firm maximizes profits, it ensures that resources are not wasted. However, the market itself, should minimize profits as it is the cost to the value chain. Competition is the key tool by which markets overcome the individual firm's profit maximization incentive. The profit motive is a good of value to the economy. According to free market economic theory, it is needed to provide incentive to generate efficiency and innovation. However, over-remuneration of the profit motive creates profit inefficiency. With massive reductions in competition in many industries due to consolidation and mergers, the US economy has become profit inefficient, with record profits occurring in recent years. This creates a deadweight loss to the economy.

== Criticisms ==
The majority of criticisms against the profit motive center on the idea that profits should not supersede the needs of people or the protection of the environment. Michael Moore's film Sicko, for example, attacks the healthcare industry for its alleged emphasis on profits at the expense of patients. Moore explains:

We should have no talk of profit when it comes to helping people who are sick. The profit motive should be nowhere involved in this. And you know what? It's not fair to the insurance companies either because they have a fiduciary responsibility to make as much money as they can for their shareholders. Well, the way they make more money is to deny claims or to kick people off the rolls or to not even let people on the rolls because they have a pre-existing condition. You know, all of that is wrong.

The Catholic Church's Compendium on its social teaching argues that "environmental protection cannot be assured solely on the basis of financial calculations of costs and benefits. The environment is one of those goods that cannot be adequately safeguarded or promoted by market forces." Pope Francis, in his 2015 encyclical letter Laudato si', adds a rhetorical question to this text:

Is it realistic to hope that those who are obsessed with maximizing profits will stop to reflect on the environmental damage which they will leave behind for future generations?

Another common criticism of the profit motive is that it is believed to encourage selfishness and greed. Critics of the profit motive contend that companies disregard morals or public safety in the pursuit of profits.

== Counter-criticisms ==
Free-market economists argue that the profit motive, coupled with competition, often reduces the final price of an item for consumption, rather than raising it. They argue that businesses profit by selling a good at a lower price and at a greater volume than the competition. Economist Thomas Sowell uses supermarkets as an example to illustrate this point: "It has been estimated that a supermarket makes a clear profit of about a penny on a dollar of sales. If that sounds pretty skimpy, remember that it is collecting that penny on every dollar at several cash registers simultaneously and, in many cases, around the clock."

Economist Milton Friedman has argued that greed and self-interest are universal human traits. On a 1979 episode of The Phil Donahue Show, Friedman states, "The world runs on individuals pursuing their separate interests." He continues by arguing that only in capitalist countries, where individuals can pursue their own self-interest, people have been able to escape from "grinding poverty".

Author and philosopher Ayn Rand defended selfishness on ethical grounds. Her nonfiction work, The Virtue of Selfishness, argues that selfishness is a moral good and not an excuse to act with disregard for others:

The Objectivist ethics holds that the actor must always be the beneficiary of his action and that man must act for his own rational self-interest. But his right to do so is derived from his nature as man and from the function of moral values in human life—and, therefore, is applicable only in the context of a rational, objectively demonstrated and validated code of moral principles which define and determine his actual self-interest. It is not a license “to do as he pleases” and it is not applicable to the altruists’ image of a “selfish” brute nor to any man motivated by irrational emotions, feelings, urges, wishes or whims.

== See also ==
- Incentive
