= Option for the poor =

Catholic social teaching on the well-being of the poor

The option for the poor, or the preferential option for the poor, is a Catholic social teaching that the Bible gives priority to the well-being of the poor and powerless. The word "option" in this phrase is a transliteration of the Spanish opción, and refers to a choice already made (e.g. by God) rather than an option that is available. It was first articulated by the proponents of Latin American liberation theology during the latter half of the 20th century, and was championed by many Latin American Christian democratic parties. It is also a theological emphasis in Methodism.

== Theological significance ==
The "preferential option for the poor" refers to a trend throughout the Bible of priority being given to the well-being of the poor and powerless of society in the teachings and commands of God. It is expressed in the Bible in words attributed directly to God, and also in words and deeds of the prophets and other righteous people. Jesus taught that on the Day of Judgment, God will ask what each person did to help the poor and needy: "Amen, I say to you, whatever you did for one of these least brothers of mine, you did for me." This is reflected in Catholic canon law, which states, "[The Christian Faithful] are also obliged to promote social justice and, mindful of the precept of the Lord, to assist the poor from their own resources."

According to this doctrine, through one's words, prayers, and deeds one must show solidarity with, and compassion for, the poor. Therefore, when instituting public policy one must always keep the "preferential option for the poor" at the forefront of one's mind. Accordingly, this doctrine implies that the moral test of any society is "how it treats its most vulnerable members. The poor have the most urgent moral claim on the conscience of the nation. We are called to look at public policy decisions in terms of how they affect the poor".

Pope Benedict XVI has taught that "love for widows and orphans, prisoners, and the sick and needy of every kind, is as essential as the ministry of the sacraments and preaching of the Gospel". This preferential option for the poor and vulnerable includes all who are marginalized in society, including unborn children, persons with disabilities, the elderly and terminally ill, and victims of injustice and oppression. Pope Leo XIV has also affirmed that "the preferential choice for the poor is a source of extraordinary renewal both for the Church and for society, if we can only set ourselves free of our self-centeredness and open our ears to their cry", adding that "it is easy to understand ... why we can also speak theologically of a preferential option on the part of God for the poor".

== Origin and usage ==
The phrase "option for the poor" was used by Fr. Pedro Arrupe, Superior General of the Society of Jesus (Jesuits) in 1968 in a letter to the Jesuits of Latin America, although its principle existed before Arrupe coined the term. The Option for the Poor, according to theologian Gustavo Gutiérrez, "involves a commitment that implies leaving the road one is on" in order to enter the world of an "insignificant" person; selflessness is the goal of this lifestyle. The option for the poor "goes through all of modern Catholic social teaching" according to theologian Daniel Groody. The phrase rose to prominence during the 1960s for its connection to liberation theology, along with its simplicity in capturing doctrinal thought in a turbulent period for the Catholic church.

Jesuit activity in Ciudad Neza, Mexico, in 1969 is an example of the option for the poor in action. After the Tlatelolco massacre in 1968, demoralized young Jesuits activists "decided to leave behind the comforts of middle-class life in the capital and moved to Ciudad Neza in 1969," bringing a fresh, democratic air to a traditional violent political method in post-revolution Mexico.

The principle was articulated by the Catholic Bishops of Latin America (CELAM) at the influential conferences in Medellin and Puebla. The resulting Medellin document, Excerpts on Justice, Peace, and Poverty, stated that the Church should support national communities "where all of the peoples but more especially the lower classes have, by means of territorial and functional structures" power to affect societal changes. Christian Smith, in analyzing the Medellin document, writes that, while mild compared to other liberation theology doctrines, it "marked a radical departure from the rhetoric and strategy of an institution" which often provided religious passive support for conservative, authoritarian power.

The Puebla conference held many of the same principles, but with some caveats. Conservative members of the Church saw the meeting as an opening to reverse social claims made by the Medellin conference, while liberation theologians desired to re-affirm the progress made in 1968. López Trujillo, the secretary general of CELAM made sure that "[c]onservative bishops were strategically placed to control committees" while "conservative staff members wrote the preparatory documents." The Washington Post reported that the conservative presence "will be felt in the direction of the conference, in the preparatory documents that will form the basis of discussion, and in the selection of bishops and others participating both as voting delegates and as advisers and official observers." However, as reported by The New York Times, the meeting ultimately struck a middle-ground, criticizing both capitalism and Marxism while calling on local communities to support the common person.

But the principle behind the phrase was articulated earlier by the Catholic Bishops at the Second Vatican Council, when in their Pastoral Constitution Gaudium et spes they spoke of the poor from the very first line, repeating the word nine times and concluding: "The council, considering the immensity of the hardships which still afflict the greater part of mankind today, regards it as most opportune that an organism of the universal Church be set up in order that both the justice and love of Christ toward the poor might be developed everywhere."

The Compendium of the Social Doctrine of the Church, published by the Roman Curia in 2004, summarizes the principle:

This love of preference for the poor, and the decisions which it inspires in us, cannot but embrace the immense multitudes of the hungry, the needy, the homeless, those without health care and, above all, those without hope of a better future.

Pope Francis's apostolic exhortation Evangelii gaudium includes a long section on "The inclusion of the poor in society" (186-216) in which he noted that "Without the preferential option for the poor, 'the proclamation of the Gospel ... risks being misunderstood or submerged'."

== Liberation theology debate ==
In its origins, the concept was connected with the Latin American liberation theology movement of the mid-20th century. As a developed theological principle, the option for the poor was first articulated by Fr. Gustavo Gutiérrez, O.P., in his landmark work, A Theology of Liberation (1971). Gutiérrez asserts that the principle is rooted in both the Old and New Testaments and claims that a preferential concern for the physical and spiritual welfare of the poor is an essential element of the Gospel.

In the mid-1980s, Cardinal Joseph Ratzinger, who later became Pope Benedict XVI, led the effort by the Holy See to stop liberation theology, which he viewed as a form of Marxism. In August 1984, shortly before the release of the official view of the Holy See, he strongly criticized several arguments of liberation theology in a private document to theologians leaked to the press. Ratzinger believed that liberation theologians contend that Christians must engage in a class struggle (in the Marxist sense) in the present to break down the gulf between rich and poor. As summarized by Cardinal Ratzinger, "The biblical concept of the poor provides a starting point for fusing the Bible's view of history with Marxist dialectic; it is interpreted by the idea of the proletariat in the Marxist sense and thus justifies Marxism as the legitimate hermeneutics for understanding the Bible."

The Congregation for the Doctrine of the Faith (of which Ratzinger was the Prefect) formulated the official Vatican view in "Instruction on Certain Aspects of the 'Theology of Liberation'". Its "limited and precise purpose: to draw the attention of pastors, theologians, and all the faithful to the deviations, and risks of deviation, damaging to the faith and to Christian living, that are brought about by certain forms of liberation theology which use, in an insufficiently critical manner, concepts borrowed from various currents of Marxist thought." The Instruction elaborated that it was not a disavowal of people who were responding to "the 'preferential option for the poor.' It should not at all serve as an excuse for those who maintain the attitude of neutrality and indifference in the face of the tragic and pressing problems of human misery and injustice." It further explained:

More than ever, it is important that numerous Christians, whose faith is clear and who are committed to live the Christian life in its fullness, become involved in the struggle for justice, freedom, and human dignity because of their love for their disinherited, oppressed, and persecuted brothers and sisters. More than ever, the Church intends to condemn abuses, injustices, and attacks against freedom, wherever they occur and whoever commits them. She intends to struggle, by her own means, for the defense and advancement of the rights of mankind, especially of the poor.

What separates legitimate Catholic liberation theology from illegitimate Marxist propaganda, the Instruction argued, is the fact that we are all called to continually work towards a better world, including the continual improvement of conditions for the poor and marginalized. We are not, however, called to fully overturn the unjust power dynamics in this world by succumbing to the sin of unjust violence and greed ourselves. Indeed, the Instruction implied that some liberation theologians supported methods similar to the deprivation of people's freedoms by totalitarian regimes in the name of liberation. It charged that these supporters "betray the very poor they mean to help."

Compendium of the Social Doctrine of the Church, written by the Pontifical Council for Justice and Peace under Pope John Paul II, argues that we must accept that it may not be possible to fully eliminate the problem of poverty completely from this world. It stated:

Christian realism, while appreciating on the one hand the praiseworthy efforts being made to defeat poverty, is cautious on the other hand regarding ideological positions and Messianistic beliefs that sustain the illusion that it is possible to eliminate the problem of poverty completely from this world. This will happen only upon Christ's return, when he will be with us once more, for ever.

Jesuit theologian Enrique Nardoni has argued at length in his exhaustive study, Rise Up, O Judge, that the Bible as a whole and its cultural context support a preferential option for the poor.

Several representatives of Latin American liberation theology also use the option for the poor as a criterion for assessing environmental conflicts. Arguing that the consequences of environmental degradation are distributed unequally and concern the developing countries and the poor to a greater extent than the industrialized countries that caused the problem, authors like Leonardo Boff urge the Church to get engaged in environmental policy advocacy and to act as a lawyer on the side of the poor and marginalized. A position paper of the German Bishops' Conference on Climate Change (2007) therefore pleads for also applying the option for the poor to the victims of climate change (no. 40).

== See also ==
- Preferentialism – Topic in ethics
