= Social question =

Social concept

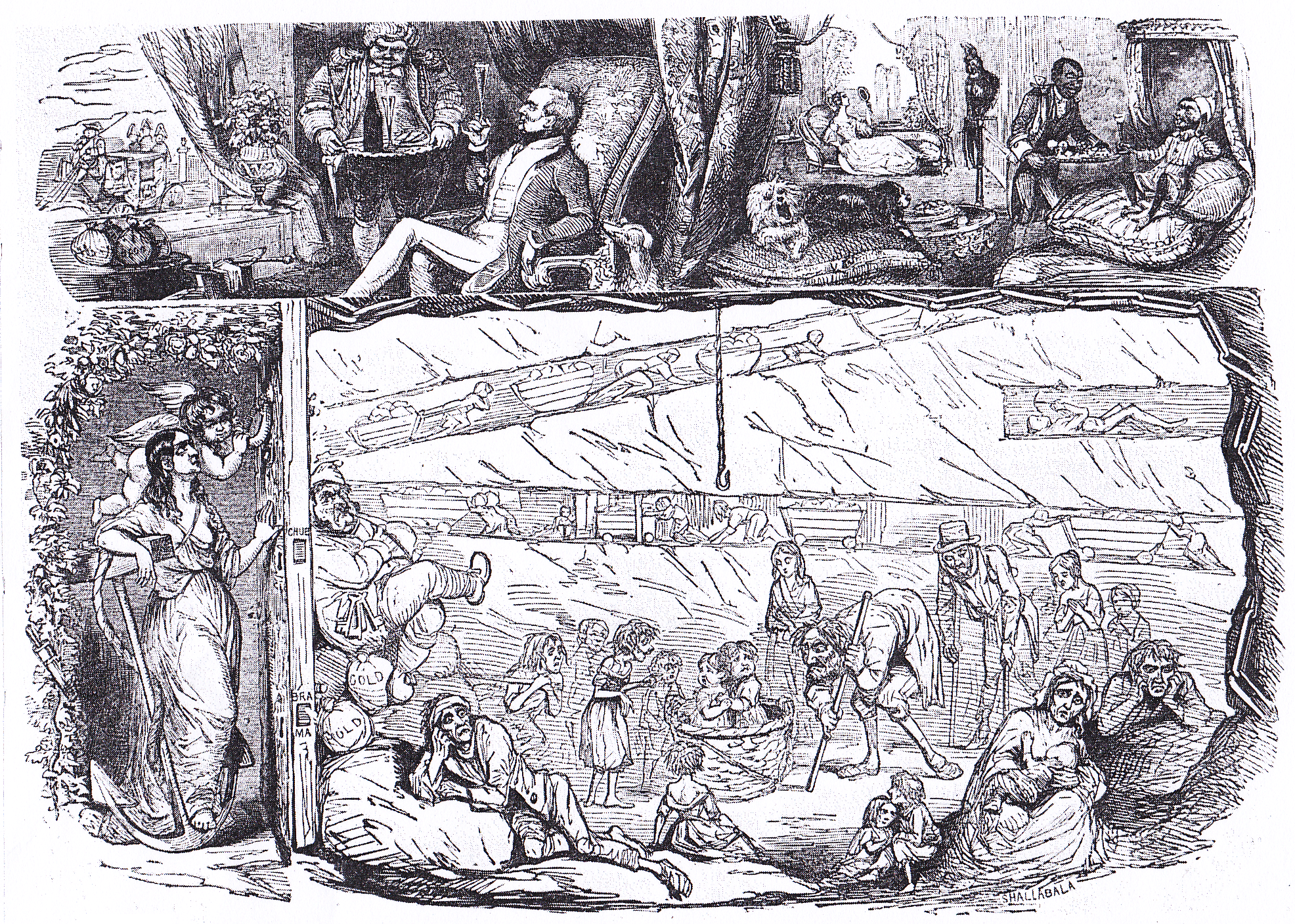
CAPITAL AND LABOUR (caricature in Punch Magazine, May 1843)

The social question is the opposition between capital and labour (also described as the gap between rich and poor). It describes the situation of workers facing constant insecurity and poverty. The term was coined in 19th-century Europe, in response to the industrial revolution and subsequent rise of the wage labor system. The social question applies to any area with an urban wage-earning class. Its effects include riots, strikes, and the formation of unions.

== In the 19th century ==
The idea of the social question grew from social grievances that accompanied the Industrial Revolution and the following population explosion, due to the transition from an agrarian to an urbanising industrial society. In England, the beginning of this transition was noted from about 1760, in Germany from the early 19th century. It was characterized by a rapidly growing population that created a wage-earning proletariat, enclosure, peasant liberation, rural exodus and urbanisation, the decline of the old trades and a gradual emergence of the factory industry. About these changes Pope John Paul II wrote in the encyclical Centesimus annus: "The Pope and the Church with him were confronted, as was the civil community, by a society which was torn by a conflict all the more harsh and inhumane because it knew no rule or regulation. It was the conflict between capital and labour, or — as the Encyclical puts it — the worker question." (In the 19th century the term 'worker question' was used as a synonym for the term 'social question'.)

Factors like growing mobility of workforces caused urbanization and spurred industrialization. For example, in Germany, low-paid Russian and Polish farmhands moved in during the busy season, leading German farmhands to move into cities looking for stable employment. Meanwhile, in Great Britain, 1834 reforms to Poor Laws took welfare away from able-bodied, unemployed people.

=== Coinage ===
The term was used first in France as question sociale, in Germany by the 1840s as soziale Frage, and in the Netherlands as the sociale vraagstuk. In Great Britain, the term "social question" did not become a standard term. Instead, people referred to "social problems," "social pathology," or "social disorganization."

=== Core Issues ===
The core problems of the social question were pauperism and the existential insecurity of peasants, rural servants, artisans, laborers, and small clerks. These problems led to strikes and even riots.

Over time, the problem shifted. Between about the 1850s and the 1870s, industry experienced a strong upswing, while the decline of cottage industries and the crisis of the crafts continued. A third phase in Germany, beginning around 1870, was marked by high industrialization and the transition to an industrial society. The social question now became primarily a workers' question. Mass migration from the countryside to the urban industrial centers, phenomena accompanying the formation of large cities and the social integration of the industrial workforce preoccupied political leaders as well as the bourgeois public. Depending on the perception of the problem and the interests at stake, different approaches to the social question were developed.

=== Religious viewpoints ===
Several prominent Catholic figures have spoken about the plight of the poor. The Catholic church includes a set of doctrines around human dignity, called Catholic social teaching. Adolph Kolping, a priest, worked to improve the lives of workers. Pope Leo XIII wrote an open letter titled Rerum Novarum in 1891. In it, he addressed duties between the capitalist and laboring classes, in addition to the need to end poverty.

F. D. Maurice was a founder and early advocate of Christian socialism.

=== Consequences ===
The social question resulted in riots, strikes and the foundation of unions and parties. Karl Marx and Friedrich Engels wrote The Communist Manifesto trying to give an answer to the problems resulting from the industrialisation. In 1875, Karl Marx criticized the term 'social question' as a newspaper scribbler's phrase.

The German Kaiserreich developed social laws, such as a public health insurance, pension system and an unemployment insurance to share social safety with their populations and avoiding socialist revolutions. Otto von Bismarck did not expect that the Social Question could be solved within a generation or two.

Being able to produce large amounts of goods on the one hand and creating wealth for a limited group of people while some groups remain poor in a materialistic or intellectual way on the other hand is still an important economic and philosophic challenge to solve.

== In the 20th century ==
After World War II, the social question appeared to be solved in the developed world by policy trends. The rise of communist states and welfare systems under capitalist states created upward social mobility. Average incomes rose and workers achieved a higher quality of life, leading many to predict that the labor question was obsolete.

In the 1980s, increasing globalization led to competition between workers in developed and developing countries. As a result, unions in rich nations lost power. Nonstandard employment relationships became more common, leading to a decrease in wages and social security.

== In the 21st century ==
The social question is different between the developed and developing world. Inequality between nations causes migration in search of work opportunities, especially when people's home countries lack desirable jobs.

== See also ==
- Rerum Novarum – Letter by Pope Leo XIII on the conditions of workers
- Adolph Kolping – Catholic priest who provided social support for the working class
- Johann Hinrich Wichern
- Gustav von Schmoller
- Evangelii gaudium
- Socialism
- Henri de Saint-Simon
- Robert Owen
- F. D. Maurice
- Louis Blanc
- Sociology
- Conflict theories
- The labor problem
- Robert Castel (Les Métamorphoses de la question sociale)
- Sustainable Development Goals – Adopted by the United Nations, discussing poverty and inequality reduction
