= God is Love =

God is Love may refer to:

- two statements in chapter 4 of the First Epistle of St. John: "Whoever does not love does not know God, because God is love." (1 John 4:8) and "God is love. Whoever lives in love lives in God, and God in them." (1 John 4:16)
- Deus caritas est - Latin for "God is Love", Pope Benedict XVI's first encyclical
- God Is Love - a work of art by Leonid Denysenko

== Music ==
- God Is Love (album), by Dave Fitzgerald, 2004
- "God Is Love", a song by Common from Let Love, 2019
- "God Is Love", a song by Lenny Kravitz from Circus, 1995
- "God Is Love", a song by Marvin Gaye from What's Going On, 1971
- "God Is Love", a song by Philip Bailey from The Wonders of His Love, 1984
