= Carità =

Carità or Carita is a feminine given name which may refer to:

== Given name ==
- Carita Grönholm (born 1991), Finnish group rhythmic gymnast
- Carita Hansson (born 1991), Swedish female weightlifter
- Carita Holmström (born 1954), Finnish pianist, singer and songwriter
- Carita Järvinen (born 1943), known simply as Carita, Finnish fashion model and actress
- Carita Thorén (born 1991), Swedish female weightlifter
- Carita Virkkunen (born 1962), known as Mona Carita, Finnish singer

== See also ==
- Caritas (disambiguation)
