= God Is Love (album) =

Studio album by Dave Fitzgerald
- Released: 2004
- Recorded: ICC Studios, Eastbourne, England
- Genre: Celtic music, Christian music
- Label: ICC Records

Dave Fitzgerald chronology
Breath of Heaven (2001)	God Is Love (2004)

God Is Love is an album by Dave Fitzgerald. Released in 2004, it is the latest release from flute and saxophone player from this founding member of Iona.

== Track listing ==
1. "Opening"
2. "Ubi Caritas"
3. "God So Loved"
4. "Love"
5. "Agnus Dei"
6. "Ma Navu"
7. "Tallis"
8. "O Euchari"
9. "No Scenes Of Stately Majesty"
10. "Hydrydol"
11. "There Is A Green Hill"
12. "Amazing Love"
13. "I Will Sing Of Your Love Forever"

== Personnel ==
- Dave Fitzgerald - Soprano & Tenor Saxophones, Flutes, Assorted Woodwind

== Release Details ==
- 2004, UK, ICC Records ICCD79630, Release Date ? ? 2004, CD

== Reviews ==
Professional ratings
Review scores
Source	Rating
Cross Rhythms	8/10

Peter Ould of Cross Rhythms praised the usage of woodwind instruments in God is Love.
