= Compendium of the Social Doctrine of the Church =

Catholic doctrine document

The Compendium of the Social Doctrine of the Church is a document issued by the Pontifical Council for Justice and Peace in 2004 to offer "a complete overview of the fundamental framework of the doctrinal corpus of Catholic social teaching". The work was created at the request of Pope John Paul II to consolidate and organize Church social doctrine. The work reads that:

The Church ... intends with this document on her social doctrine to propose to all men and women a humanism that is up to the standards of God's plan of love in history, an integral and solidary humanism capable of creating a new social, economic and political order, founded on the dignity and freedom of every human person, to be brought about in peace, justice and solidarity.

The compendium's audience includes bishops, priests, men and women religious (e.g., nuns, deacons), catechists, lay faithful, and all people of good will committed to the common good. Catholic social doctrine is Magisterium, which obligates Catholics to adhere to it.

== History ==
The document was presented by Renato Martino, President of the Pontifical Council for Justice and Peace, on April 2, 2004, the memorial of Francis of Paola. He noted that the document was preceded by Laborem Exercens, Sollicitudo Rei Socialis and Centesimus Annus, wherein John Paul II expounded upon the church's social teaching. The late Pope wanted a compilation of all the church's doctrines on society, so the Pontifical Council for Justice and Peace wrote the Compendium of the Social Doctrine of the Church to him, whom it named the "Master of Social Doctrine and Evangelical Witness to Justice and Peace".

== Content ==
The compendium is divided into three parts, with twelve chapters, an introduction and a conclusion, a letter by Secretary of State Angelo Sodano, and abbreviations for books of the Bible and church documents it references.

The Compendium of the Social Doctrine of the Church presents a systematic overview of Catholic Social Teaching, grounding social, political, and economic life in the dignity of the human person and the common good. It emphasizes that every person is created in the image of God, and therefore social structures must promote justice, solidarity, peace, and authentic human flourishing. By applying Gospel values to contemporary challenges, it shows how living the faith calls us to engage the world with love and justice, making Catholic Social Teaching a concrete expression of witness and discipleship in action.

The conclusion is entitled "For a Civilization of Love".

== Editions ==
The compendium is available online at the Vatican website. It also can be purchased as a printed book, which runs about 250 pages in the English edition, plus an additional 200 pages of back matter.
