= Catholic social teaching =

Social doctrine of the Catholic Church

Catholic social teaching (CST) is an area of Catholic doctrine which is concerned with human dignity and the common good in society. While no official canon of principles or documents exists, it addresses oppression, the communitarian role of the state, subsidiarity, social organization, social justice, and wealth distribution. The foundation for this body of thought was laid by Pope Leo XIII in his 1891 encyclical letter, Rerum novarum, but its roots can be traced to Catholic theologians such as Thomas Aquinas and Augustine of Hippo. CST is also derived from the Bible and cultures of the ancient Near East.

According to Pope John Paul II, the foundation of social justice "rests on the threefold cornerstones of human dignity, solidarity and subsidiarity". According to Pope Benedict XVI, its purpose "is simply to help purify reason and to contribute, here and now, to the acknowledgment and attainment of what is just ... [The church] has to play her part through rational argument and she has to reawaken the spiritual energy without which justice ... cannot prevail and prosper." Pope Francis, according to Cardinal Walter Kasper, made mercy "the key word of his pontificate... [while] Scholastic theology has neglected this topic and turned it into a mere subordinate theme of justice".

Catholic social teaching is critical of modern social and political ideologies of the left and of the right, such as liberalism, atheistic forms of socialism and communism, anarchism, atheism, capitalism, and fascism, which have been condemned by several popes since the late nineteenth century. It has tried to strike a balance between respect for human liberty (including the right to private property and subsidiarity) and concern for society, including the weakest and poorest. It has distanced itself from capitalism, with John Paul II writing:

Catholic social doctrine is not a surrogate for capitalism. In fact, although decisively condemning "socialism", the church, since Leo XIII's Rerum Novarum, has always distanced itself from capitalistic ideology, holding it responsible for grave social injustices. In Quadragesimo Anno, Pius XI, for his part, used clear and strong words to stigmatize the international imperialism of money.

== History ==
Catholic social doctrine is rooted in the social teachings of the New Testament, the Church Fathers, the Old Testament, and Hebrew scriptures. The church responded to historical conditions in medieval and early modern Europe with philosophical and theological teachings on social justice which considered the nature of humanity, society, economy, and politics. During the era of mass politics and industrialization, Catholic social teaching needed to account for "the social question": the social dislocation, economic suffering, and political turbulence which arose from modernization. Since the early 19th century, a number of Catholic thinkers responded to the revolutionary tide begun by the French Revolution and the Napoleonic era. A new synthesis of Catholic natural law primarily influenced by the writings of Thomas Aquinas, combined with the new social sciences of politics and economics, was embraced by the Vatican by the middle of the century; however, it took several decades for this synthesis to become established in Catholic social teaching. Pope Leo XIII, in a series of encyclicals spanning 20 years, formalized the modern approach to Catholic social teaching which combines evangelical teachings on love with natural law and social-scientific arguments about what constitutes human prosperity. These principles have been consistently reiterated by later popes over the subsequent century and more.

=== Rerum novarum ===
The publication of Leo XIII's encyclical, Rerum novarum, on 15 May 1891 began the development of a body of social teaching in the Catholic Church. It was written when the once-agrarian populations of Italy and western Europe were undergoing rapid urbanisation in newly industrialized cities, with many living in squalor and poverty. Similar trends developed in the Americas. Pius IX (Leo's predecessor) had seen the end of church control of the Papal States, and become isolated in the Vatican. Pius had railed against the unification of Italy during the Risorgimento, which consumed the last years of his pontificate, and lost the faith of the Romans, who voted to join the newly integrated Italy in 1870. Scholars have written that Leo, when he became pope without being temporal ruler of three million mainly-rural subjects, saw that the new industrial working class was the responsibility of the church; Rerum novarum was a response to the competition of communism, which analyzed in works such as Das Kapital and The Communist Manifesto the social conditions facing the industrialized poor. Rerum novarum begins by saying that "some opportune remedy must be found quickly for the misery and wretchedness pressing so unjustly on the majority of the working class ... so that a small number of very rich men have been able to lay upon the teeming masses of the labouring poor a yoke little better than that of slavery itself."

Leo wanted to reject the solutions offered by communism: "[T]hose who deny these rights [private ownership] do not perceive that they are defrauding man of what his own labour has produced." He declared a "most sacred law of nature" that humans have the right to private ownership, inheritable property, and providing for their children "all that is needful to enable them to keep themselves decently"; the "main tenet of socialism, community of goods, must be utterly rejected".

He disputed a central idea of communism: that class war was inevitable, and rich and poor were inexorably driven to conflict. Leo stressed the need for justice as central to religion, with the church the most powerful intermediary to achieve justice and peace. That justice relied on the equality of rich and poor, and extended to all citizens of a country. It went beyond the principle that "the interests of all, whether high or low, are equal", to include a demand that "public administration must duly and solicitously provide for the welfare and the comfort of the working classes".

Leo elevated the family from the concepts of serfdom and economic interest (or collectivism) by giving its interests, moral authority and importance "at least equal rights with the State". The state would be guilty of a "pernicious error" if it exercised intimate control of a family. But "extreme necessity" should "be met by public aid" when a family was in need – the pre-eminence of the needs, protection and independence of a family unit was central to the teaching of the encyclical.

He stressed the equity of the employer-employee relationship. There should be shown "respect in every man for his dignity as a person", balanced with proper performance of "the work which has been freely and equitably agreed upon"; "capital cannot do without labour, nor labour without capital".

Where the rights of the poor and the worker are in jeopardy, they must be especially protected; the rich and powerful have other means of protecting their interests. The state must legislate to protect workers from low pay, over-long working hours or over-taxing work, and avail themselves of the protection provided by trade unions.

==== Reaction ====
The encyclical was followed in parts of Italy with the creation of social movements which advocated the alleviation of local social concerns. Members of the church became involved in worker-support campaigns, for example a campaign for cotton workers. Financial and moral support for a strike which began on 22 September 1909 in Bergamo (known as the "fifty-day strike") was provided by Bishop Giacomo Maria Radini-Tedeschi and Father Angelo Roncalli (eventually to become Pope John XXIII), who saw the need for "pastoral modernity" in the church.

Support for social movements became unpopular, however, when Pope Pius X replaced Leo in 1903. Catholic involvement in Italian political life had been banned under previous popes; Pius allowed a network of spies to identify and report on supporters of social and political movements, and subjected them to questions, apostolic visits and pressures to desist.

Rerum novarum dealt with persons, systems and structures, the three co-ordinates of the modern promotion of justice and peace now integral to the church's mission. It was followed by a number of encyclicals and messages on social issues; forms of Catholic action developed worldwide, and social ethics was taught in schools and seminaries. To mark the 40th anniversary of Rerum novarum, Pope Pius XI issued Quadragesimo anno expanding on some of its themes.

=== Pope John XXIII ===
During the post–Second World War period, attention turned to the problems of social and economic development and international relations. Pope John XXIII released Mater et magistra, subtitled "Christianity and Social Progress", on 15 May 1961. The encyclical expanded the church's social doctrine to cover relations between rich and poor nations, examining the obligation of rich countries to assist poor countries while respecting their cultures, and the threat of global economic imbalance to world peace. John expanded further on this on 11 April 1963 in Pacem in terris (Peace on Earth), the first encyclical addressed to Catholics and non-Catholics. In it, he linked the establishment of world peace to the laying of a foundation consisting of proper rights and responsibilities between individuals, social groups, and states from the local to the international level. John exhorted Catholics to understand and apply social teachings:

Once again we exhort our people to take an active part in public life, and to contribute towards the attainment of the common good of the entire human family as well as to that of their own country. They should endeavour, therefore, in the light of the Faith and with the strength of love, to ensure that the various institutions—whether economic, social, cultural or political in purpose—should be such as not to create obstacles, but rather to facilitate or render less arduous people's perfectioning of themselves both in the natural order as well as in the supernatural.

The encyclical, issued at the height of the Cold War, also denounced the nuclear arms race and called for a stronger United Nations.

=== Second Vatican Council ===
The primary document from the Second Vatican Council concerning social teachings is Gaudium et spes, the Pastoral Constitution on the Church and the Modern World, which is considered one of the council's chief accomplishments. Unlike earlier documents, the constitution covered a range of issues governing the relationship of social concerns and Christian action. It asserts the fundamental dignity of each person, declaring the church's solidarity with those who suffer and those who comfort the suffering:

The joys and the hopes, the griefs and the anxieties of the people of this age, especially those who are poor or in any way afflicted, these are the joys and hopes, the griefs and anxieties of the followers of Christ.

Other conciliar documents, such as Dignitatis humanae (drafted largely by American Jesuit John Courtney Murray) also apply to the church's present-day social teachings on freedom, while the council's Decree on the Apostolate of the Laity asserted that lay people should "above all learn the principles and conclusions of the social doctrine" in order to both develop and apply it.

=== Pope Paul VI ===
Pope Paul VI noted disparities in wealth and development between the industrialized West and the Third World in his 1967 encyclical, Populorum progressio (The Development of Peoples). The encyclical asserted that free international trade alone was inadequate to correct these disparities, and supported the role of international organizations in correcting them. Paul called on rich nations to meet their moral obligation to poor nations, pointing out the relationship between development and peace. The church did not intend to take sides, but to promote basic human dignity: "There can be no progress towards the complete development of individuals without the simultaneous development of all humanity in the spirit of solidarity".

Experienced in human affairs, the Church ... "seeks but a solitary goal: to carry forward the work of Christ Himself under the lead of the befriending Spirit." ... But, since the Church lives in history, she ought to "scrutinize the signs of the times and interpret them in the light of the Gospel." Sharing the noblest aspirations of men and women and suffering when she sees them not satisfied, she wishes to help them attain their full flowing, and that is why she offers all people what she possesses as her characteristic attribute: a global vision of man and of the human race.

The May 1971 apostolic letter Octogesima adveniens addressed the challenge of urbanization and urban poverty, stressing the personal responsibility of Christians to respond to injustice. For the tenth anniversary of the Second Vatican Council on 26 October 1975, Paul issued Evangelii nuntiandi (Evangelization in the Modern World). In it, he said that combating injustice was an essential component of modern evangelism.

=== Pope John Paul II ===
Pope John Paul II continued his predecessors' work of developing Catholic social doctrine. Of particular importance were his 1981 encyclical, Laborem exercens, and Centesimus annus in 1991.

On one hand there is a growing moral sensitivity alert to the value of every individual as a human being without any distinction of race, nationality, religion, political opinion, or social class. On the other hand these proclamations are contradicted in practice. How can these solemn affirmations be reconciled with the widespread attacks on human life and the refusal to accept those who are weak, needy, elderly, or just conceived? These attacks go directly against respect for life; they threaten the very meaning of democratic coexistence, and our cities risk becoming societies of people who are rejected, marginalized, uprooted, and oppressed, instead of communities of "people living together".

Not endorsing a political agenda, the church holds that this teaching applies in the public (political) realm as well as the private. Laborem exercens qualifies private ownership in relation to the common use of goods to which all people are entitled. The church "has always understood this right within the broader context of the right common to all to use the goods of the whole creation: the right to private property is subordinated to the right to common use, to the fact that goods are meant for everyone." Many of these concepts were reiterated in Centesimus annus, issued on the 100th anniversary of Rerum novarum, and critiquing socialism and unfettered capitalism. The 2005 publication of the Compendium of the Social Doctrine of the Church, a work entrusted to the Pontifical Council for Justice and Peace, was another milestone of John Paul's papacy.

=== Pope Benedict XVI ===
Pope Benedict XVI's 2009 encyclical Caritas in veritate added perspectives to social teaching (including the relationships with charity and truth), and suggested the need for a strong "world political authority" to deal with humanity's most-pressing challenges and problems. This concept has been controversial, particularly among right-of-center U.S. Catholic thinkers who are suspicious or disdainful of supranational and international organizations such as the United Nations. The concept was developed in a 2011 note from the Pontifical Council for Justice and Peace, "Towards reforming the International Financial and Monetary Systems in the context of World Political Authority".

In Caritas in veritate, Benedict set Paul VI's social encyclical Populorum progressio as a new point of reference for Catholic social thought in the 21st century. The scholar Thomas D. Williams wrote "by honouring Populorum progressio with the title of 'the Rerum novarum of the present age,' Benedict meant to elevate Populorum Progressio, conferring on it a paradigmatic status not dissimilar to that enjoyed by Rerum novarum throughout the twentieth century." Williams said that the reason for the elevation was that Populorum progressio, "for all its real deficiencies, effected an important conceptual shift in Catholic social thinking, by moving from the worker question (with its attendant concerns of just wages, private property, working environment, and labour associations) to the broader and richer social benchmark of integral human development."

Pope Benedict has criticized capitalism, characterizing it as a system which recognizes no duties or obligations towards human beings and crediting it with creating a destructive type of individualism which "encourages selfishness, as men are concerned exclusively with what they should receive from society and unconcerned with what they can or should contribute to it." Catholic teaching recognizes the common good as a key requirement for prosperity; capitalism disregards it for the pursuit of profit, leading to exploitation and the erosion of moral limitations. Benedict was concerned about the role of charity in capitalism, criticizing capitalism for its indifference towards charity and for its discouraging respect for the interests of others in favour of one's own self-interest. He blamed capitalism for an increasing alienation and anomie in modern societies, citing the prevalence of drugs, alcohol, and "deceptive illusions of happiness" as evidence of this alienation. Benedict described this alienation as stemming from capitalism's self-centred emphasis, "where individuals act in their own self-interest, seeking the satisfaction of their own wants - man is not concerned with his fellow man, except insofar as he may be instrumental in satisfying his wants."

=== Pope Francis ===
Pope Francis described mercy as "the very substance of the Gospel of Jesus", and asked theologians to reflect this in their work. He emphasized the importance of mercy, declaring 2016 an Extraordinary Jubilee of Mercy. From 8 December 2015 to 20 November 2016, Francis wanted church members "to place the sacrament of God's mercy—which is the sacrament of penance and reconciliation—into the central pastoral life for the Church."

In his apostolic exhortation Evangelii gaudium, Francis said: "It is vital that government leaders and financial leaders take heed and broaden their horizons, working to ensure that all citizens have dignified work, education and healthcare." He affirmed "the right of states" to intervene in the economy to promote "the common good":

While the earnings of a minority are growing exponentially, so too is the gap separating the majority from the prosperity enjoyed by those happy few. This imbalance is the result of ideologies which defend the absolute autonomy of the marketplace and financial speculation. Consequently, they reject the right of states, charged with vigilance for the common good, to exercise any form of control. A new tyranny is thus born, invisible and often virtual, which unilaterally and relentlessly imposes its own laws and rules.

Francis has warned about the "idolatry of money":

[S]ome people continue to defend trickle-down theories which assume that economic growth, encouraged by a free market, will inevitably succeed in bringing about greater justice and inclusiveness in the world. This opinion, which has never been confirmed by the facts, expresses a crude and naïve trust in the goodness of those wielding economic power and in the sacralized workings of the prevailing economic system.

In his second encyclical, Laudato si', Francis makes a "biting critique of consumerism and irresponsible development with a plea for swift and unified global action" to combat environmental degradation and climate change. According to Daniel Schwindt, "[S]ome writers seem to suggest (as is common among persons who've never taken the time to read the encyclicals themselves), that Pope Francis' Laudato Si represents some new venture on the part of the Church—a departure from its customary range of subject matter." But, Schwindt argues, Francis' approach to climate change, however, continues that of his predecessor. Pope Benedict XVI wrote,

The order of creation demands that a priority be given to those human activities that do not cause irreversible damage to nature, but which instead are woven into the social, cultural, and religious fabric of the different communities. In this way, a sober balance is achieved between consumption and the sustainability of resources.

Francis' apostolic exhortation Gaudete et exsultate emphasized the call to perfect charity, based on the "service of your brothers and sisters" (No. 14) and the church's social-teaching tradition.

=== Pope Leo XIV ===
Pope Leo XIV has compared the "new things" to which Rerum novarum responded with "a transformation of similar magnitude, with perhaps even greater consequences" in his own time, to which his encyclical Magnifica humanitas is a response.

== Principles ==
No official canon of principles or documents exists, according to the Australian Catholic Social Justice Council.

=== Human dignity ===
Human dignity is a principle of Catholic social thought. According to the church's catechism, "Being in the image of God, the human individual possesses the dignity of a person, who is not just something, but someone. He is capable of self-knowledge, of self-possession, and of freely giving himself and entering into communion with other persons. And he is called by grace to a covenant with his Creator, to offer him a response of faith and love that no other creature can give."

=== Subsidiarity ===
Subsidiarity in Catholic social thought originated with Wilhelm Emmanuel von Ketteler, Bishop of Mainz in the mid-to-late 19th century, and was incorporated into Pope Pius XI's encyclical Quadragesimo anno:

Just as it is gravely wrong to take from individuals what they can accomplish by their own initiative and industry and give it to the community, so also it is an injustice and at the same time a grave evil and disturbance of right order to assign to a greater and higher association what lesser and subordinate organizations can do. For every social activity ought of its very nature to furnish help to the members of the body social, and never destroy and absorb them.

— Pope Pius XI, Quadragesimo anno, §79

It was written forty years after Rerum novarum – like a number of modern social encyclicals, during the intensifying struggle between communism and capitalism. Promulgated in 1931, Quadragesimo anno is a response to German Nazism, Soviet communism, and Western European and American capitalism. The primary author of the 1931 encyclical's "subsidiarity" section was the German Jesuit and economist Oswald von Nell-Breuning.

Gregory Beabout suggests that subsidiarity also draws upon an older concept: the Roman military term subsidium. Beabout writes, "the role of the subsidium (literally, to sit behind) is to lend help and support in case of need." In Beabout's etymology, subsidiarity indicates that the higher social unit ought to "sit behind" the lower one to lend help and support as needed. According to another etymological interpretation, subsidiarity means "to 'seat' ('sid') a service down ('sub') as close to the need for that service as is feasible". Either interpretation indicates a hermeneutic of subsidiarity, in which the higher social body's rights and responsibilities for action are predicated on their assistance to (and empowerment of) the lower.

Francis McHugh says that in addition to the "vertical" dimension of subsidiarity, there is also a "horizontal" dimension which "calls for a diversity of semi-autonomous social, economic, and cultural spheres". Quadragesimo anno presents these "spheres" as occupying the space between individual and state:

... things have come to such a pass through the evil of what we have termed "individualism" that, following upon the overthrow and near extinction of that rich social life which was once highly developed through associations of various kinds, there remain virtually only individuals and the State. This is to the great harm of the State itself; for, with a structure of social governance lost, and with the taking over of all the burdens which the wrecked associations once bore. the State has been overwhelmed and crushed by almost infinite tasks and duties.

— Pope Pius XI, Quadragesimo anno, §78

These associations, or "lesser societies", are encouraged because they are the vehicle by which society functions most effectively and corresponds most closely with human dignity. Examples of these associations include the family, unions, nonprofit organizations, religious congregations, and corporations of all sizes.

Subsidiarity charts a course between individualism and collectivism by locating the responsibilities and privileges of social life in the smallest unit of organization at which they will function. Larger social bodies (the state or others) are permitted and required to intervene only when smaller ones cannot carry out the tasks themselves. Such intervention must be temporary, empowering the smaller social body to carry out such functions on its own.

=== Solidarity and the common good ===
Solidarity is a firm, persevering determination to commit oneself to the common good, not merely "vague compassion or shallow distress at the misfortunes of others". Flowing from faith, it is fundamental to the Christian view of social and political organization. Each person is connected to (and dependent on) all humanity, collectively and individually.

=== Charity ===
According to Caritas in veritate, "charity is at the heart of the Church". Every responsibility and every commitment spelt out by that doctrine is derived from charity, which according to Jesus is the synthesis of the entire Law (Matthew 22:36–40). It gives substance to the relationship with God and neighbour, and is the principle of micro-relationships and relationships with friends, family members and small groups.

The church chose the concept of "charity in truth" to avoid a degeneration into sentimentality in which love becomes empty. In a culture without truth, there is a risk of losing love. Prey to subjective emotions and opinions, the word love is abused and distorted to the point where it means its opposite. Truth frees charity from an emotionalism which deprives it of relational and social content, and of a fideism that deprives it of human and universal breathing space. In truth, charity reflects the personal and public dimensions of faith in God and the Bible.

=== Developments and interpretations ===
Distributism is a school of economic and social thought developed by the Catholic thinkers G. K. Chesterton and Hilaire Belloc. It holds that social and economic structures should promote social justice, which is best served by a broad distribution of ownership. Distributists cite Rerum novarum:

We have seen that this great labour question cannot be solved save by assuming as a principle that private ownership must be held sacred and inviolable. The law, therefore, should favour ownership, and its policy should be to induce as many as possible of the people to become owners.

This principle is used as a basis for progressive tax rates, anti-monopoly laws and economic cooperatives, including credit unions. Rerum novarum, Quadragesimo anno and Centesimus annus advocate a just distribution of income and wealth. In Caritas in veritate, Pope Benedict XVI used the term "redistribution" eight times (all positively).

Other interpretations drawing from Catholic Social Teaching include Catholic socialism (proposed by Andrew Collier) and Catholic communism (developed by Guido Miglioli and Cesare Seassaro).

== Key themes ==
Although there is no official list of key themes, the United States Conference of Catholic Bishops (USCCB) has identified the seven key themes of Catholic social teaching. Other sources identify more (or fewer) themes, based on their reading of key documents of the social magisterium.

=== Sanctity of human life and dignity of the person ===
The foundation of Catholic social teaching is the sanctity of human life. Catholics believe in an inherent human dignity, from conception to death, and human life must be valued above material possessions. Pope John Paul II wrote and spoke on the inviolability of human life and dignity in his encyclical, Evangelium Vitae, ("The Gospel of Life").

Catholics oppose acts considered attacks and affronts to human life, including abortion, fornication (including contraception), capital punishment, euthanasia, genocide, torture, the direct and intentional targeting of noncombatants in war, and every deliberate taking of innocent human life. In the Second Vatican Council's Pastoral Constitution on the Church in the Modern World, Gaudium et spes ("Joy and Hope"), "from the moment of its conception life must be guarded with the greatest care." The church did not historically oppose war in all circumstances, and Catholic moral theology has generally emphasized just war theory since the mid-third century. However, Francis' encyclical Fratelli Tutti says that in light of modern weapons of mass destruction, it is increasingly harder to meet the criteria of a just war; the encyclical calls for an end to war. The post–Vatican II Catechism of the Catholic Church said about capital punishment:

The traditional teaching of the Church does not exclude, presupposing full ascertainment of the identity and responsibility of the offender, recourse to the death penalty, when this is the only practicable way to defend the lives of human beings effectively against the aggressor.

"If, instead, bloodless means are sufficient to defend against the aggressor and to protect the safety of persons, public authority should limit itself to such means, because they better correspond to the concrete conditions of the common good and are more in conformity to the dignity of the human person.

"Today, in fact, given the means at the State's disposal to effectively repress crime by rendering inoffensive the one who has committed it, without depriving him definitively of the possibility of redeeming himself, cases of absolute necessity for suppression of the offender 'today ... are very rare, if not practically non-existent.' [John Paul II, Evangelium Vitae 56.]."

Applying this argument to the United States, in 2005 the USCCB launched "a major Catholic campaign to end the use of the death penalty". In 2018, Pope Francis amended the catechism to oppose all uses of the death penalty in the modern world (but not calling it intrinsically evil).

Believing that men and women are made in the image and likeness of God, Catholic doctrine teaches respect for all humans based on an inherent dignity. According to John Paul II, every human person "is called to a fullness of life which far exceeds the dimensions of his earthly existence, because it consists in sharing the very life of God." Catholics oppose racial prejudice and other forms of discrimination. In 2007, the USCCB wrote:

Catholic teaching about the dignity of life calls us ... to prevent genocide and attacks against noncombatants; to oppose racism; and to overcome poverty and suffering. Nations are called to protect the right to life by seeking effective ways to combat evil and terror without resorting to armed conflicts except as a last resort, always seeking first to resolve disputes by peaceful means. We revere the lives of children in the womb, the lives of persons dying in war and from starvation, and indeed the lives of all human beings as children of God.

A belief in the inherent dignity of the human person requires basic human needs to be adequately met, including food, health care, and shelter. The bishops have seen this as a basis for supporting social-welfare programmes and governmental economic policies which promote the equitable distribution of income and access to essential goods and services.

=== Call to families and communities and pursuing the common good ===
According to the Book of Genesis, God said: "It is not good for the man to be alone". The church teaches that man is a sacred and a social person, and families are the basic units of society. It advocates a complementarian view of marriage, family life, and religious leadership. Full human development takes place in relationship to others. The family is a sanctuary for the creation and nurturing of children. Families form communities, communities form states, and each person is part of the human family. How these communities organize themselves politically, economically and socially is of the utmost importance. Each institution must be judged by how much it enhances, or detracts from, the life and dignity of humanity.

Catholic social teaching opposes collectivist approaches (such as communism), unrestricted laissez-faire policies, and the notion that a free market automatically produces social justice. The state has a positive moral role to play, since no society will achieve a just and equitable distribution of resources with a totally free market. All people have a right to participate in the economic, political, and cultural life of society and, under the principle of subsidiarity, state functions should be carried out at the lowest practical level. Catholic social teaching values the role of intermediary organizations such as labour unions, community organizations, fraternal groups and parish churches.

=== Rights and responsibilities about social justice ===
Every person has a fundamental right to life and to the necessities of life. The right to exercise religious freedom publicly and privately by individuals and institutions and freedom of conscience need to be defended. The right to freely express religious beliefs protects all other rights.

The church supports private property, and teaches that "every man has by nature the right to possess property as his own". The right to private property is not absolute, however, and is limited by the concepts of "universal destiny of the goods of the earth" and of social mortgage. It is moral and just for Catholics to destroy property used in an evil way by others, or for the state to redistribute wealth from those who have unjustly hoarded it.

Corresponding to these rights are duties and responsibilities to one another, to one's family, and to the larger society. Rights should be understood and exercised in a moral framework rooted in the dignity of the human person and social justice. Those who have more have a greater responsibility to contribute to the common good than those who have less.

The encyclical Laborem exercens (1981) by Pope John Paul II describes work as key to the social question and a vocation. Work includes every form of action by which the world is transformed, shaped or maintained by humans; through work, fulfillment is achieved. To fulfill themselves, people must cooperate and work together to create a common good. Justice is the state of social harmony in which the actions of each person best serve the common good.

According to natural law, freedom is the empowerment of good. Free people have responsibilities; in human relationships, this implies responsibilities towards each other. The Catholic bishops of England and Wales said in "The Common Good" (1996), "The study of the evolution of human rights shows that they all flow from the one fundamental right: the right to life. From this derives the right to a society which makes life more truly human: religious liberty, decent work, housing, health care, freedom of speech, education, and the right to raise and provide for a family" (section 37). The right to life means that every person has a responsibility to help sustain and develop the lives of others.

The Ten Commandments reflect natural law as it applies to humanity. The first three are the foundation: the love, worship and sanctity of God, and the building of people around God. The other seven commandments deal with the love of humanity, describing the ways in which people must serve the common good (Exodus 20:3–17). Jesus summarized the commandments with a New Commandment: "Love one another, as I have loved you" (John 13:34, 15:9–17). The mystery of Jesus is that of love. In a homily to government leaders and politicians, Pope John Paul II said:

Man's relationship with God is not one of fear, of slavery or oppression; rather, it is a relationship of serene trust born of a free choice motivated by love ... By his Law God does not intend to coerce man's will, but rather to set it free it from everything that could compromise its authentic dignity and its full realization.

==== Human rights according to the catechism ====
The Catechism of the Catholic Church explains that every person has human rights. Even though the church regards civil divorce to be a sin, it also regards the criminalization of all or even most sins to be itself a sin: coercion.

According to the church, the right to life is fundamental. Pope John Paul II wrote in Evangelium Vitae: "... the first of the fundamental rights, the right to life ... the fundamental right and source of all other rights which is the right to life, a right belonging to every individual."

=== Option for the poor ===
Jesus taught that at the Last Judgement, God will ask each person what they did to help the poor and needy: "Amen, I say to you, whatever you did for one of these least brothers of mine, you did for me." This is reflected in the church's canon law: "The Christian faithful are also obliged to promote social justice and, mindful of the precept of the Lord, to assist the poor from their own resources."

In words, prayers and deeds, people must demonstrate solidarity and compassion towards the poor; public policy must emphasize the option for the poor. The moral test of a society is how it treats its most vulnerable members, and the poor have the most urgent moral claim on a nation's conscience.

Pope Benedict XVI taught that "love for widows and orphans, prisoners, and the sick and needy of every kind, is as essential as the ministry of the sacraments and preaching of the Gospel". According to the church, this preferential option for the poor and vulnerable includes all who are marginalized: unborn children, persons with disabilities, the elderly and terminally ill, and victims of injustice and oppression.

=== Dignity of work ===
Society must pursue economic justice, and the economy must serve people. Employers must not "look upon their work people as their bondsmen, but ... respect in every man his dignity as a person ennobled by Christian character." Employers contribute to the common good through the goods or services they provide, and by creating jobs which uphold the dignity and rights of workers.

Workers have a right to work, to earn a living wage, and to form trade unions to protect their interests. All workers have a right to productive work, to decent and fair wages, and to safe working conditions. Workers also have responsibilities: to provide a fair day's work for a fair day's pay, to treat employers and co-workers with respect, and to work in ways which contribute to the common good. Workers must perform the work they have agreed to do.

The Compendium of the Social Doctrine of the Church asserts that women have a right to work and sets out to recognise and defend that right and the contribution made by women in the workplace.

In 1933, the Catholic Worker Movement was founded by Dorothy Day and Peter Maurin. It was committed to nonviolence, voluntary poverty, prayer, and hospitality for the marginalized and poorest in society. There are over 185 Catholic Worker communities around the world who advocate against injustice, war, racial prejudice, and violence.

=== Solidarity and earthly goods ===
Pope John Paul II wrote in the 1987 encyclical Sollicitudo rei socialis, "Solidarity is undoubtedly a Christian virtue. It seeks to go beyond itself to total gratuity, forgiveness, and reconciliation. It leads to a new vision of the unity of humankind, a reflection of God's triune intimate life." A person must be their brother's keeper, although they may be separated by distance, language or culture. Jesus taught that people must love their neighbors as themselves, and the parable of the Good Samaritan shows that compassion should extend to all people. The church leadership can have a more pro-immigration stance than Catholic laity in some countries.

Solidarity at the international level primarily concerns the Global South, and the church has habitually insisted that loans be forgiven as needed. Charity to individuals or groups must be accompanied by transforming unjust political, economic and social structures. The world and its goods were created for the use and benefit of all God's creatures, as reflected in social justice and limits on private property.

=== Care for God's creation ===
A Catholic vision of justice is more comprehensive than civil equity, encompassing right relationships among all members of God's creation. Earthly goods are available for humanity to use under a social mortgage which entails responsibility to protect the environment as a gift from God, intended to benefit everyone. Man was given dominion over creation as a steward, rather than an exploiter.

Catholic social teaching recognizes that the poor are the most vulnerable to environmental impact and endure disproportional hardship when natural areas are exploited or damaged. US bishops established an environmental justice programme to assist parishes and dioceses who wanted to conduct education, outreach and advocacy of these issues. The US Conference of Catholic Bishops Environmental Justice Program (EJP) calls Catholics to a deeper respect for God's creation and engages parishes in activities that deal with environmental problems, particularly those affecting the poor.

== Encyclicals and other official documents ==
- Rerum novarum (1891), encyclical of Pope Leo XIII;
- Singulari Quadam (1912), encyclical of Pope Pius X;
- Quadragesimo anno (1931), encyclical of Pope Pius XI;
- Divini Redemptoris (1937), encyclical of Pope Pius XI;
- Fulgens radiatur (1947), encyclical of Pope Pius XII;
- Exsul Familia (1952), apostolic constitution of Pope Pius XII;
- Mater et magistra (1961), encyclical of Pope John XXIII;
- Pacem in terris (1963), encyclical of Pope John XXIII;
- Dignitatis humanae (1965), declaration of the Second Council of the Vatican;
- Gaudium et spes (1965), constitution of the Second Council of the Vatican;
- Populorum progressio (1967), encyclical of Pope Paul VI;
- Humanae vitae (1968), encyclical of Pope Paul VI;
- Octogesima adveniens (1971), apostolic letter of Pope Paul VI;
- Laborem exercens (1981), encyclical of Pope John Paul II;
- Sollicitudo rei socialis (1987), encyclical of Pope John Paul II;
- Centesimus annus (1991), encyclical of Pope John Paul II;
- Evangelium vitae (1995), encyclical of Pope John Paul II;
- Compendium of the Social Doctrine of the Church (2004);
- Deus caritas est (2005), encyclical of Pope Benedict XVI;
- Caritas in veritate (2009), encyclical of Pope Benedict XVI;
- Evangelii gaudium (2013), apostolic exhortation of Pope Francis;
- Laudato si' (2015), encyclical of Pope Francis;
- Gaudete et exsultate (2018), apostolic exhortation of Pope Francis;
- Fratelli tutti (2020), encyclical of Pope Francis;
- Magnifica Humanitas (2026), encyclical of Pope Leo XIV.

== Catholic social teaching in action ==
=== Holy See ===
Several teams in the Holy See are dedicated to social issues. The Pontifical Council for Justice and Peace is tasked with promoting "justice and peace in the world, in the light of the Gospel and of the social teaching of the Church". It works to clarify, expand on, and develop new teachings in the areas of peace, justice, and human rights. The council also collaborates with local and international Catholic organizations working in those areas, and with the social welfare organs of the United Nations through the Secretariat of State.

The Pontifical Council Cor Unum is the Holy See's primary group devoted to charitable works, and supervises the activities of Caritas Internationalis. It also operates the John Paul II Foundation for the Sahel and the Populorum Progressio Foundation. The Pontifical Academy of Social Sciences promotes the study of the social sciences. The academy works with a number of dicasteries, particularly the Council for Justice and Peace, to develop the church's social teachings. The Holy See has established the World Movement of Christian Workers as the church's organization for working men and women to advance Catholic social initiatives.

=== Europe and the Americas ===
Christian democracy (a political movement in a number of countries in Europe and Latin America) is influenced by Catholic social teaching, which has also influenced other political movements worldwide. Subsidiarity (which originated in Rerum novarum) was established in European Union law by the Treaty of Maastricht, which was signed on 7 February 1992 and enacted on 1 November 1993. Progressio Ireland, a nongovernmental development organization based in Dublin, was founded on the principles of Catholic social teaching. It works to achieve sustainable development and the eradication of poverty in the world's underdeveloped nations. Mondragon Cooperative Corporation, a cooperative based in Mondragón, Spain, was also founded on the principles of Catholic social teaching. Pax Romana is active worldwide, particularly in Europe, the Americas, and Africa. Choosing the Common Good was published by the Catholic Bishops' Conference of England and Wales before the 2010 United Kingdom general election.

Social Catholic Movements were popular in Latin America, beginning in the late 19th century. These movements became the training grounds for activists involved in liberation theology circles, which that became influential in the 1960s and 1970s. Social Catholic organizations helped cultivate the social networks and leadership skills that were paramount in boosting Liberation Theology following Vatican II. Latin America, influenced by Catholic social activism, was often more progressive than Vatican II had been.

Social Catholic teaching originated within the church but often took on a reality that was more led by the laity in Latin America with a political and economic bent. The roots of social Catholic Movements within the church offered a safe space for Liberation theology and other to develop. In Brazil, that meant that progressive bishops could provide a limited shield for leftist activists as early as the 1920s. In Chile similar work occurred, and political organizations, known as Specialized Catholic Action, drew on church-created groups like the JOC for their leadership.

== See also ==
- Luigi Taparelli
- Adolph Kolping
- Catholic theology
- Christian corporatism
- Christian finance
- Christian socialism
- Christian theology
- Corporatism
- Distributism
- Fidesco International
- Konrad Adenauer
- Liberation theology
- Catholic Church and politics
- Social market economy
- Social teachings of the papacy
- Solidarism
- Third Way
- Ukraine prison ministries
- Catholicism and socialism
- Catholic communism
