= Populorum progressio =

1967 encyclical by Pope Paul VI, on the Church's role in human development

Populorum progressio Latin for 'The Development of Peoples' Encyclical of Pope Paul VI
- Signature date: 26 March 1967
- Subject: The need to promote the development of peoples
- Number: 5 of 7 of the pontificate
- Text: In Latin; In English

Populorum progressio is an encyclical written by Pope Paul VI on the topic of "the development of peoples" and that the economy of the world should serve mankind and not just the few. It was issued on 26 March 1967.

It touches on a variety of principles of Catholic social teaching such as the right to a just wage; the right to security of employment; the right to fair and reasonable working conditions; the right to join a union; and the universal destination of resources and goods.

== Content ==
=== ‘Humanism’ ===
Paul VI espoused a “transcendent humanism which surpasses its nature and bestows new fullness of life”, which he described as a “new humanism”. Drawing on the Integral humanism of Jacques Maritain's L’humanisme intégral, Paul VI declared that the “ultimate goal is a full-bodied humanism”. Citing Blaise Pascal's Pensées:

True humanism points the way toward God and acknowledges the task to which we are called, the task which offers us the real meaning of human life. Man is not the ultimate measure of man. Man becomes truly man only by passing beyond himself. In the words of Pascal: “Man infinitely surpasses man.”

== Legacy ==
Twenty years later, Pope John Paul II issued another encyclical, Sollicitudo rei socialis, in commemoration of the 20th anniversary of Populorum progressio.

In 2004, the UK-based nongovernmental development organisation Catholic Institute for International Relations (CIIR), changed its name to Progressio and established Progressio Ireland in Dublin. The organisation takes its name from this document and is based on Catholic Social Teachings (CST) espoused in the encyclical.

In 2009, Pope Benedict XVI published the encyclical Caritas in Veritate, which addressed many of the themes discussed in Populorum progressio.

== See also ==
- World Day of Peace
