= Caritas (yacht) =

History

United States
- Name: Caritas (original); LYNIE JANE (As of March 2016)
- Namesake: Caritas Island
- Builder: George Lawley & Son, Neponset, Massachusetts
- Laid down: 1922
- Completed: 1926
- Home port: Caritas Island, Bridgeport, CT, New York Yacht Club
- Identification: 222064 / MDNK
- Fate: Towed inland a quarter-mile by 12 tractors, she now is a closed tourist attraction in Northern California

General characteristics
- Type: Yacht
- Tonnage: 181 GT; 123 NT
- Length: 98 ft (30 m)
- Beam: 20 ft (6.1 m)
- Draft: 6 ft (1.8 m)
- Depth of hold: 11.5 ft (3.5 m)
- Installed power: 2 × Winton gasoline engines; 250 ihp (190 kW)
- Propulsion: 2 × screws
- Speed: 12 mph (10 kn; 19 km/h)
- Complement: 8

Caritas was a private power yacht constructed in 1922 for sugar magnate J. Percy Bartram, a member of the New York Yacht Club. Launched at the shipyards of George Lawley & Son at Neponset, Boston, Massachusetts, it was designed by the naval architect firm Cox & Stevens of New York.

The deckhouse, pilot house, and all exterior brightwork were made out of teak wood. Furnishings and equipment on Caritas were worthy of being classed among the handsomest and most luxurious yachts of the time. Caritas was powered with a pair of 125 hp Winton gasoline engines and a speed of 12 mph.

She would later be known as Merdonia, Spitfire, Lockwood, Largo, and Aleta.
