= Caritas in veritate =

2009 encyclical of Pope Benedict XVI

Caritas in veritate Latin for 'Charity in truth' Encyclical of Pope Benedict XVI
- Signature date: 29 June 2009
- Subject: Integral human development in charity and truth
- Pages: 127
- Number: 3 of 3 of the pontificate
- Text: In Latin; In English

Caritas in veritate (English: Charity in Truth) is the third and last encyclical of Pope Benedict XVI, and his only social encyclical. It was signed on 29 June 2009 and was published on 7 July 2009. It was initially published in Italian, English, French, German, Polish, Portuguese, and Spanish.

The encyclical is concerned with the problems of global development and progress towards the common good, arguing that both Love and Truth are essential elements of an effective response. The work is addressed to all strata of global society – there are specific points aimed at political leaders, business leaders, religious leaders, financiers, and aid agencies but the work as a whole is also addressed to all people of good will.

Caritas in veritate contains detailed reflection on economic and social issues. The Pope points out that the church does not offer specific technical solutions, but rather moral principles to inform the building of such solutions. The economic themes include an attack on free-market fundamentalism, though a simplistic polarization of the free market model versus interventionist big government solutions is rejected. There is emphasis on the need for the actions of all economic actors to be informed by ethics as well as the profit motive. Other areas discussed include hunger, the environment, migration, sexual tourism, bioethics, cultural relativism, social solidarity, energy, and population issues.

== Synopsis ==
The encyclical is divided into six chapters, along with an introduction and conclusion.

=== Introduction ===
The encyclical begins with a discussion of how charity and truth are fundamental parts of our development, both as individuals and for humanity as a whole. Love (charity) (Note: Caritas can be translated as either love or charity; when the Pope uses the word charity in the encyclical it is always employed at least partly in the old fashioned sense meaning love.) is described as an extraordinary force motivating people to strive for the common good: "The more we strive to secure a common good corresponding to the real needs of our neighbours, the more effectively we love them". The Pope emphasizes that while charity is "at the heart of the Church's social doctrine", it must be linked to truth if it is to remain a force for good. Without truth, love can become an "empty shell" to be filled with emotional influences which in the worst case can result in love turning into its opposite. Similarly, social action without truth can end up "serving private interests and the logic of power". Another risk for the individual without truth is to fall prey to an excessively sceptical and empirical view of life. The Pope pays tribute to Pope Paul VI's 1967 encyclical Populorum progressio, which he describes as the "Rerum novarum of its day". (Note: Rerum novarum was an 1891 encyclical widely recognized for its progressive social impact, such as advocacy for workers' right to form unions and the duty for employers to pay them a liveable wage.) Benedict goes on to recognize he is echoing the principal theme of Populorum progressio in calling for people to strive for greater development with all their hearts and minds. He says the Christian is called on to engage politically for the benefit of other people in so far as he or she is able, and equally to love and help their neighbours on an individual level.

=== Chapter 1: The message of Populorum progressio ===
Chapter 1 continues the discussion of Populorum progressio, illustrating how it fits in both with Pope Paul VI's overall magisterium and with the broader tradition of Catholic teachings. Benedict recounts how the earlier encyclical taught that institutions designed to hasten social development are not by themselves sufficient to ensure good outcomes. He reminds us that Paul VI advised the chief causes of enduring poverty are not material in nature, but lie in failures of the will and "the lack of brotherhood among individuals and peoples". He asserts that people working for the benefit of others need their own individual sense of vocation, which is derived in part from the Bible and the life of Christ. Benedict states that while reason alone can identify inequality and while globalization has made us neighbours, neither can establish the sense of fraternity which flows from God's love. The Pope introduces a theme concerning the importance in tackling hunger which reoccurs later in the work, using a quote from Populorum progressio: "the peoples in hunger are making a dramatic appeal to the peoples blessed with abundance".

=== Chapter 2: Human development in our time ===
The Pope describes globalization as the main feature of the current age. While acknowledging the great benefits delivered, including the emergence from underdevelopment of whole regions and nations, the Pope warns globalization has already created many new problems and that without the influence of charity and truth, it could cause "unprecedented damage and create new divisions within the human family".

Benedict warns of dangers arising from unbalanced growth and from those pursuing profit purely for its own sake, without seeing profit as a means to do good. He discusses increasing inequality, including new groups of poor emerging even in rich nations. The pope says globalization has in part given rise to damaging cultural eclecticism and levelling. Addressing political leaders, Benedict says that "The primary capital to be safeguarded is man" and suggests that reducing prolonged unemployment should be a high priority as it causes "great psychological and spiritual suffering". He goes on to discuss the suffering caused in the underdeveloped world by food shortages, saying that to feed the hungry is an ethical imperative. The Pope considers a number of trends harmful to development: the prevalence of corruption in both poor and rich countries, the existence of harmful speculative capital flows, the tendency for development aid to be "diverted from it proper ends due to irresponsible actions", the "unregulated exploitation of the earths resources", and "on the part of rich countries there is excessive zeal for protecting knowledge through an unduly rigid assertion of the right to intellectual property, especially in the field of healthcare". While acknowledging that organized religion is not always an entirely positive influence, the Pope warns of the danger of state imposed atheism, which he says deprives citizens of the moral and spiritual strength needed for genuine development and to respond generously to divine love. He emphasizes that successfully resolving the various global challenges will need Love as well as knowledge and quotes Populorum progressio: "the individual who is animated by true charity labours skilfully to discover the causes of misery, to find the means to combat it, to overcome it resolutely".

=== Chapter 3: Fraternity, economic development and civil society ===
The third chapter calls for an "economy of gratuitousness and fraternity", discussing how giving and receiving gift reflects God's nature and how it helps builds communities. Benedict states civil society is the most natural setting for gratuitousness, but that gratuity is also needed in the operations of the State and the Market. With reference to the 2008 financial crisis, Benedict argues against a market economy where economic agents act purely out of self-interest — he says that commercial logic alone cannot solve all of society's problems. The Pope states there is both a moral and economic case to conclude that "in commercial relationships the principles of gratuitousness and the logic of gift as an expression of gratuitousness can and must find their place within normal economic activity". He argues that giving fosters a sense of justice, responsibly and sense of the common good amongst different economic actors. The Pope emphasizes the call in Populorum progressio for the creation of a market model where "all will be able to give and receive". He states everyone, including business managers and investors, should base their decisions partly on an awareness of how their actions will affect progress towards global solidarity.

=== Chapter 4: The development of people, rights and duties, the environment ===
Here the Pope dwells at length on the concept that rights must be linked to duties and that the latter should take precedence over the former. Too much focus on one's own rights can lead people to believing they owe nothing to anyone but themselves, to making insistent demands that one's own rights are promoted by public authorities even when they are harmful, such as the "right to excess" or to choose vice. This can lead to the whole notion of rights being weakened and even core rights being violated. Benedict argues that core rights are safest when everyone accepts they have a duty to respect other people's development and rights. The Pope turns to duties of governments, which should strive to look after the deep moral needs of their citizens and to promote ethical economic systems where actors look to maximize not just profits but also the common good. The last part of the chapter is about the duty to protect the environment, though the Pope also warns that nature should not be regarded as more important than man. He regrets the way "some states, power groups and companies hoard non–renewable energy resources" which he says "represents a grave obstacle to development in poor countries". Benedict notes the importance for developed countries to take the lead in reducing their own environmental impact, which may involve in the adoption of new, more environmentally friendly life styles for their populations.

=== Chapter 5: The cooperation of the human family ===
Hard copies of the encyclical have been published by Ignatius Press

In this chapter, Benedict discusses the importance for individuals to live in communion with each other. He states "the development of peoples depends above all on a recognition that the human race is a single family". The Pope suggests isolation is one of the causes of various forms of poverty, including self-inflicted isolation where the individual elects to withdraw from society. Solidarity and fraternity are antidotes to isolation, and also essential for effective development. The Pope suggests that in addition to solidarity, attention needs to be paid to the principle of subsidiarity — "the most effective antidote against any form of all-encompassing welfare state". While welcoming the role of different cultures and faiths in fostering cooperation for human development, the Pope advises discernment is needed so folk can avoid dangerous ideologies and religions that encourage people to cut themselves off from communion with others. He says religion must play a part in political discussion, so there can be a fruitful dialogue between faith and reason. The Pope cautions against secularism and fundamentalism, both of which make such dialogue difficult.

Moving on to economic aid from developed to less developed states, Benedict explains that the preeminent sort of help needed is increased access to the markets of developed countries. He also says developed countries should allocate an increased proportion of their budgets to foreign aid. There is a discussion concerning an ethical response to international tourism and to the "epoch-making" phenomena of migration — Benedict reminds us that every migrant is a person possessing inalienable rights "that must be respected by everyone and in every circumstance". In the last part of the chapter, the Pope returns to poverty, discussing the great harm caused by unemployment, and how the issue can be responded to not just by government but by financiers, microfinance, labour unions and consumers. He suggests increased "regulation of the financial sector" is needed to safeguard vulnerable parties.

The chapter ends with a call for an establishment of an effective global authority

To manage the global economy; to revive economies hit by the crisis; to avoid any deterioration of the present crisis and the greater imbalances that would result ... there is urgent need of a true world political authority ... [which] would have to have the authority to ensure compliance with its decisions from all parties.

The Pope wishes to see reform and strengthening of the United Nations and the international monetary system, including for poorer nations to be given a louder voice on international bodies.

=== Chapter 6: The development of peoples and technology ===
The Pope praises the benefits of technology but warns that a purely technocrat mindset where decisions are made only on grounds of efficiency will not deliver true development. Technical decisions must not be divorced from ethics. Benedict discusses bioethics and states that practices such as abortion, eugenics and euthanasia are morally hazardous and that accepting them can lead to greater tolerance for various forms of moral degradation. He turns to another consequence of the technocratic mindset, the viewing of people's personalities in purely psychological terms at the exclusion of the spiritual, which he says can lead to people feeling empty and abandoned even in prosperous societies. Benedict says there is something miraculous in every act of knowledge. Love which is so essential to human development can not be fully appreciated from a materialistic perspective, but only with awareness of the spiritual dimension.

=== Conclusion ===
The Pope reiterates his belief that charity and truth are essential for integral human development, both for the individual and for peoples. An awareness of God's love "gives us the courage to continue seeking and working for the benefit of all" despite not reaching is in this world. The conclusion ends with a prayer to the Virgin Mary to intercede with God that all may be granted strength and generosity for the task of bringing about the "development of the whole man and of all men".

== Preparation and publication delays ==
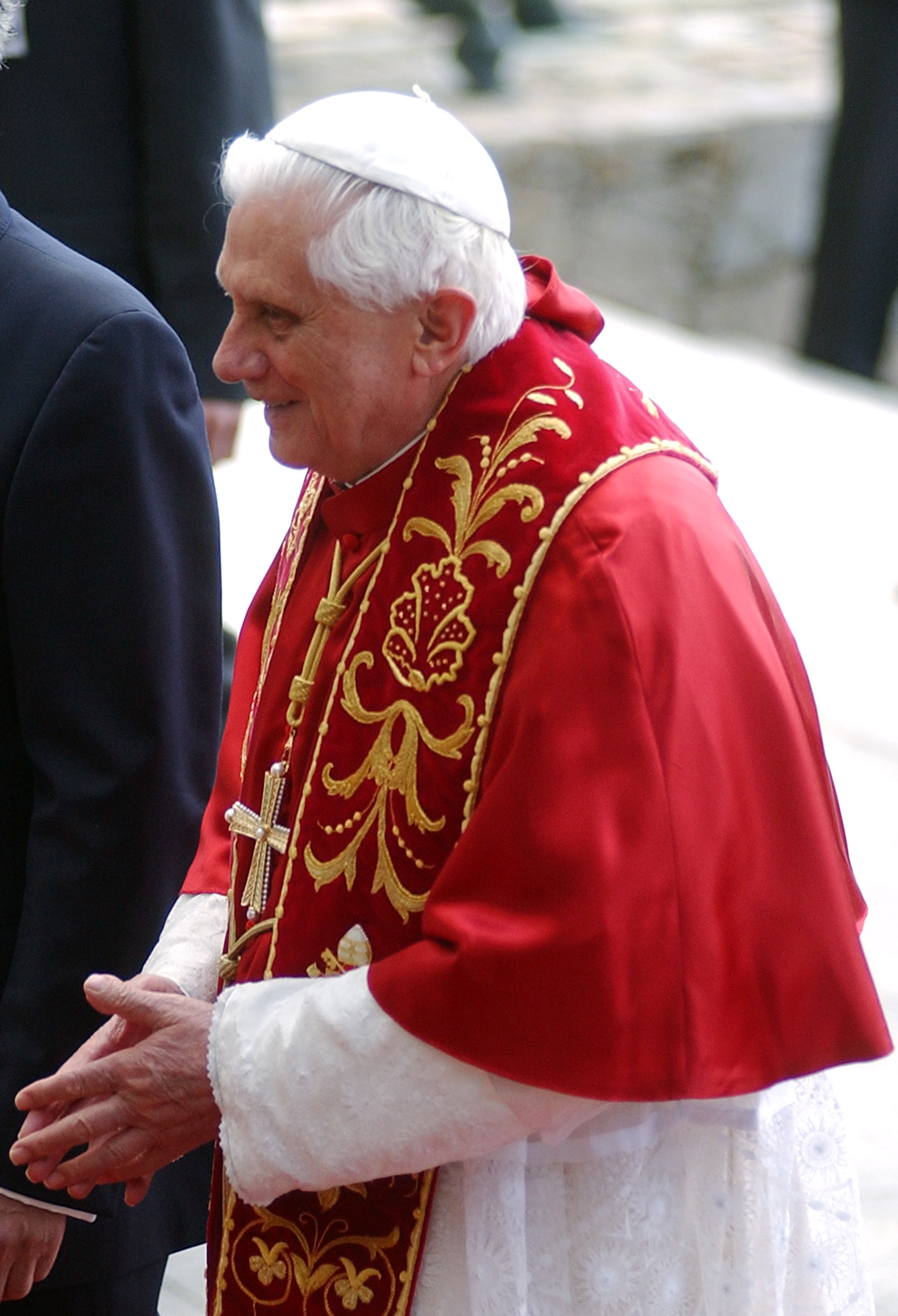
Benedict XVI: "Charity in truth, to which Jesus Christ bore witness by his earthly life and especially by his death and resurrection, is the principal driving force behind the authentic development of every person and of all humanity."—first sentence of Caritas in veritate

The encyclical was drafted during Benedict's July 2007 holiday at Lorenzago di Cadore in Italy's Dolomite mountains and was inspired in part by Paul VI's Populorum progressio. It was originally planned for 2007 to mark Populorum progressio's 40th anniversary, but publication was delayed.

A final draft was produced for translation in March 2008. Translation difficulties caused further delays in publication. It was reported that the translation hold was related to one of the major languages of China. Vatican Secretary of State Tarcisio Bertone said that the encyclical would be released sometime in the Fall of 2008.

In December 2008, a release was announced for 19 March 2009. One month later, a 1 May release date was announced. These third and fourth delays were reported by Vatican officials to be due to the necessity for further reflection upon the global economic concerns of late 2008 and early 2009. Regarding this delay, much attention was given to a 1985 essay presented in Rome by Benedict (then Cardinal Joseph Ratzinger) at a symposium on "Church and Economy in Dialogue", entitled "Market Economy and Ethics". Speaking on social values and the common good, Ratzinger had predicted greed and corruption in economic policies would inject a fundamental instability into the global economic system.

On 1 February 2009 it was announced that the encyclical would be released sometime in April 2009.

Commenting upon the repeated delay of Caritas in veritate, Giampaolo Crepaldi, president of the Osservatorio Internazionale: sulla dottrina sociale della Chiesa, wrote an article entitled "Awaiting the New Encyclical of Benedict XVI: What Does It Mean to Say the Social Doctrine of the Church is Timely?" He writes,

The "timeliness" of an encyclical does not merely depend on the new social problems or issues it addresses. Were this the case, establishing the timeliness of Benedict XVI's upcoming social encyclical would merely be a question of listing the social issues it tackles and then checking which and how many of them were not touched upon in previous encyclicals. That, however, is not the way it is, for the simple reason that a social encyclical is not a sociological investigation.

It therefore becomes clear that the "timeliness" of SDC stems not only from the new facts humanity has to deal with, but from the Gospel itself, which, insofar as Word incarnate, is always new. New facts and developments in history can act as a stimulus for a re-reading of everlasting truth, because everlasting truth is essentially open to such an endeavor. Were this not true, each encyclical would speak only to the men and women of its time. Present in the Church's social doctrine is an inexhaustible and irreducible element of prophecy bestowed upon it by the Gospel. Christ is ever timely, and let us not forget that the social doctrine of the Church is "announcement of Christ".

On 23 April 2009, during a conference on globalization held at the Pontifical Gregorian University in Rome, cardinal Renato Martino, president of the Pontifical Council for Justice and Peace, said that Pope Benedict XVI's third encyclical "on globalization and the poor" is expected to be released 29 June 2009 – the feast of Saints Peter and Paul.

On 28 May 2009 an unnamed Vatican official is reported to have said that

Pope Benedict XVI has completed his long-awaited encyclical on social issues and the text is now being translated into several languages, according to a Vatican official. The new document – Caritas in Veritate ("Love in Truth") – is about 100 pages long, the official said. Originally planned for 2007 to mark the 40th anniversary of Pope Paul VI's landmark social encyclical Populorum Progressio, the new papal document suffered a succession of delays as the current global economic crisis unfolded.

On the day of the actual release, 7 July 2009, the Financial Times reported the final publication had been delayed to coincide with the G8 summit in Italy.

== Reception and impact ==
The Financial Times reported that the encyclical helped influence discussion at the July 2009 G8 Summit in Italy, as the Vatican had planned. The summit resulted in a reported additional US$5 billion being allocated to combat hunger, which was one of the principal problems dealt with by the encyclical. German Chancellor Angela Merkel, who had criticized the Pope earlier in the year due to the lifting of the excommunication against anti-Semitic bishop Richard Williamson, welcomed the work, saying "Pope Benedict has encouraged the state leaders to create rules so that this sort of worldwide economic crisis isn't repeated", and "I also saw this as an order to work toward a social market economy in the world".

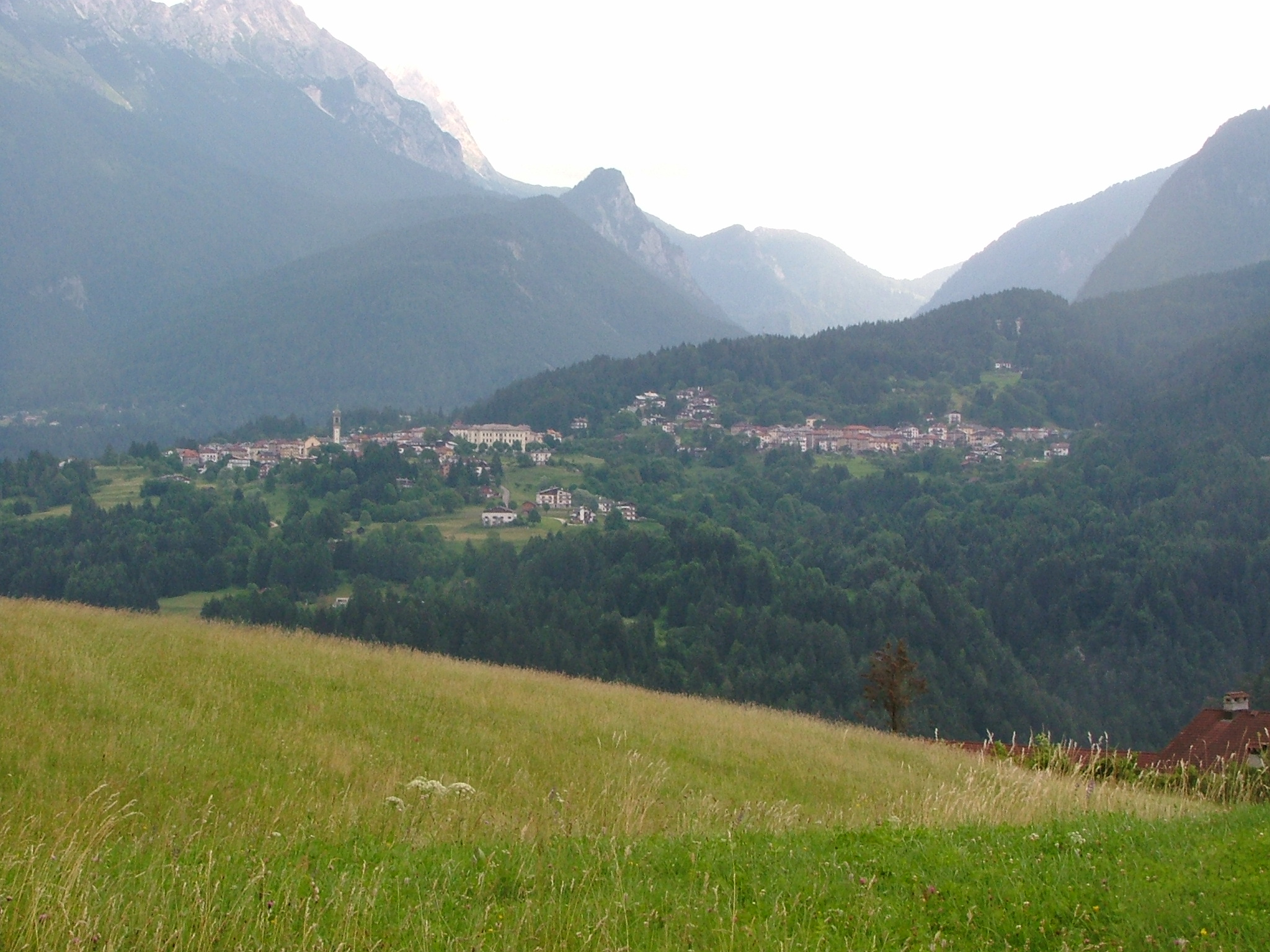
A view of the mountains by Lorenzago, where Benedict first drafted the encyclical while on holiday at his private retreat

In addition to political leaders, the encyclical has sparked much discussion among senior business leaders and bankers – for example at a private seminar held in London and devoted to discussing the relevance of Caritas in veritate, attended by guests such as Barclays chairman Marcus Agius, HSBC chairman Stephen Green, Lloyd's chairman Sir Win Bischoff, Goldman Sachs vice-chairman Lord Griffiths and CBI chairman Helen Alexander.

Caritas in veritate has been welcomed by Catholics, by Protestants, by Muslims, and by secular sources such as The Times. Pope Francis' 2015 encyclical letter, Laudato si', makes a number of references to Caritas in veritate.

The work has also attracted criticism. Secularists in Italy did not appreciate intervention by the Pope in worldly affairs. Catholic capitalists have been disturbed by some of the left-leaning themes and the call for a stronger world political authority. Writing for The Irish Times, theologian Tina Beattie praised the encyclical for its insightful comments on the economic crises. But she went on to suggest the Catholic idealization of sexuality hinted at in the encyclical may be part of the cause of child abuse scandals that have recently gained much attention in Ireland. Beattie points out that the church's high ideals "fail to distinguish between the good, the not so good and the downright bad, so that everything short of perfection stands equally condemned". She also deplores the encyclical's "apparent indifference to the suffering of sexual bodies", writing that

It makes no mention of HIV/Aids and it is silent on questions of maternal mortality and women's reproductive health, despite the fact that an estimated 536,000 women die every year from causes relating to pregnancy and childbirth, 99 per cent of them in developing countries. These are startling omissions.

== Title ==
The title of the document reverses the commonly repeated Pauline phrase on civility, "truth in love" (Latin: veritas in caritate, see Ephesians 4:15).
