= Centesimus annus =

1991 encyclical by Pope John Paul II, concerning social teaching

Centesimus annus Latin for 'The Hundredth Year' Encyclical of Pope John Paul II
- Signature date: 1 May 1991
- Subject: The centenary of the encyclical Rerum novarum
- Number: 9 of 14 of the pontificate
- Text: In Latin; In English

Centesimus annus (Latin for "the hundredth year") is an encyclical which was written by Pope John Paul II in 1991 on the hundredth anniversary of Rerum novarum, an encyclical issued by Pope Leo XIII in 1891. It is part of a larger body of writings, known as Catholic social teaching, which trace their origin to Rerum novarum and aim to relate the teachings of Jesus to the industrial age.

It was one of fourteen encyclicals issued by John Paul II. The theologian Cardinal Georges Cottier was influential in drafting the encyclical.

== Overview ==
Written in 1991, during the last days of the Cold War, Centesimus annus specifically examines contemporaneous political and economic issues. The encyclical is partially a refutation of Marxist/communist ideology and a condemnation of the dictatorial regimes that practiced it, condemning the horrors of the communist regimes throughout the world in the recent past.

The encyclical expounds issues of social and economic justice, including a defense of private property rights and the right to form private associations, including labor unions. It compares socialism to consumerism, identifying atheism as the source of their common denial of the dignity of the human individual.

The recurring themes of social and economic justice in Centesimus annus articulate foundational beliefs in the social teaching of the Catholic Church. Throughout, the Pope calls on the State to ensure justice for the poor and to protect the human rights of all its citizens. This repeats a theme from Pope Leo XIII's Rerum novarum:

When there is question of defending the rights of individuals, the defenceless and the poor have a claim to special consideration. The richer class has many ways of shielding itself, and stands less in need of help from the State; whereas the mass of the poor have no resources of their own to fall back on, and must chiefly depend on the assistance of the State. It is for this reason that wage-earners, since they mostly belong to the latter class, should be specially cared for and protected by the Government

But Pope John Paul II also defends private property, markets, and honorable business as necessary elements of a system of political economy that respects the dignity of the individual and allows him to express his full humanity.

Man fulfills himself by using his intelligence and freedom. In so doing he utilizes the things of this world as objects and instruments and makes them his own. The foundation of the right to private initiative and ownership is to be found in this activity. By means of his work man commits himself, not only for his own sake but also for others and with others. Each person collaborates in the work of others and for their good. Man works in order to provide for the needs of his family, his community, his nation, and ultimately all humanity.

== Principles ==
=== General ===
- The dignity and rights of the worker (#3).
- The right to establish professional associations of employers and workers (#3).
- The right to private property (#6).
- The right to a just wage (#8).
- The right to discharge freely one's religious duties/freedom of religion (#9).
- The kingdom of God cannot be confused with any temporal kingdom (#25).
- To defend and promote the dignity and rights of human persons regardless of personal convictions (#22).

=== Solidarity ===
- Empathizing with those around you so as to make their good your good, leading to a common pursuit of the common good (#10).
- Man cannot be understood on the basis of economics alone nor defined by class membership, but within culture (#24).
- Total recognition must be given to the rights of the human conscience (#29).
- The law is sovereign and not the arbitrary will of individuals (#44).

=== Subsidiarity ===
- A community of a higher order should not interfere in the internal life of a community of a lower order, depriving the latter of its functions, except when needed to coordinate its activity with the rest of society, always with a view to the common good (#48).

== Synopsis ==
=== Introduction ===
- Rerum novarum is of "great importance" for the Church; the "vital energies" it unleashed continue to increase (#1).
- Rerum novarum can be used to help look back at fundamental principles, "look around" at new events, and look to the future (#3).
- An analysis of history and current events is essential to the Church's mission of evangelization (#3).

=== Characteristics of Rerum novarum ===
- Rerum novarum attempted to respond to the conflict between capital and labor (#5).
- Leo XIII gave the Church a paradigm and a corpus to analyze, judge, and indicate directions for social realities (#5).
- To teach and spread her social doctrine is an essential part of the Church's evangelizing mission (#5).
- There can be no genuine solution to the "social question" apart from the Gospel (#5).
- Rerum novarum strongly affirms the dignity of work and the rights to private property, private associations, a just wage, and to discharge freely religious duties (#6-9).
- Rerum novarum's criticism of socialism and liberalism is still relevant today (#10).
- Rerum novarum's emphasis on the rights of the poor and the defenseless gives testimony to the continuity of the option for the poor (#11).
- The guiding light of Rerum novarum is its view of human dignity (#11).

=== Toward the "New Things" of Today ===
- The fundamental error of socialism is its misunderstanding of the human person as simply an element (#13).
- This error springs from atheism and results in a distortion of law and human freedom (#13).
- Atheism and contempt for the human person cause class struggle and militarism (#14).
- The State, respectful of the principle of subsidiarity, has a positive role to play in determining the juridical framework of economic affairs (#15).
- The role of the workers' movement in economic reform has been an important one (#16).
- Rerum novarum opposed ideologies of hatred and showed how violence could be overcome by justice (#17).
- Since 1945, in Europe, there has been a situation of non-war but not genuine peace: many people lost the ability to control their own destiny; an "insane" arms race swallowed up vital resources; violent extremist groups found ready support; the atomic threat oppressed the world (#18).
- After World War II, decolonization occurred. Genuine independence of developing nations is impeded by foreign economic and political control and the lack of a competent professional class (#20).
- Since 1945, the awareness of human rights—with the United Nations as a focal point—has grown (#21).
- The UN has not yet succeeded in establishing a continuously favorable development aid policy or an effective system of conflict resolution as an alternative to war (#21)

=== End of the Cold War ===
- In 1989: in Eastern Europe, oppressive regimes fell; some Third World countries began a transition to more just and participatory structures (#22).
- The Church's commitment to defend and promote human rights was an important contribution to the events of 1989 (#22).
- Factors that contributed to the fall of oppressive regimes: violation of workers' rights (#23); inefficiency of the economic system (#24); spiritual void brought about by atheism (#24).
- Non-violent, peaceful protest accomplished almost all of the changes in Eastern Europe (#23).
- The events of 1989 would be unthinkable without prayer and trust in God (#25).
- The events of 1989 illustrate opportunities for human freedom to cooperate with the plan of God who acts in history (#26).
- In some countries, the events of 1989 resulted from an encounter between the Church and the workers' movement (#26).
- The events of 1989 illustrated that the Church's social doctrine of (as well as concrete commitment to) integral human liberation does not necessitate an "impossible" compromise between Christianity and Marxism (#26).
- International structures that can help rebuild, economically and morally, the countries that have abandoned communism are needed (#27).
- Marxism's fall has highlighted human interdependence (#27).
- Peace and prosperity are goods that belong to the whole human race (#27).
- Aid for Eastern Europe, without a slackening of aid for the Third World, is needed (#28).
- There must be a change in priorities and values on which economic and political choices are made (#28).
- The advancement of the poor is an opportunity for the moral, cultural, and economic growth of all humanity (#28).
- Development must be seen in fully human, and not merely economic, terms (#29).

=== Private property and the universal destination of material goods ===
- Catholic social teaching affirms a right to private property that is limited by the common purpose of goods (#30).
- Work, which is in our day work with and for others, is the human response to God's gifts (#31).
- The possession of know-how, technology, and skill is surpassing land as the decisive factor of production (#32).
- The majority of people today do not have the means or the possibility of acquiring the basic knowledge to enter the world of technology and intercommunication. They are thus exploited or marginalized (#33).
- The human inadequacies of capitalism are far from disappearing (#33).
- Many human needs are not satisfied in a free market economy (#34).
- It is a "strict duty of justice and truth" and a requirement of dignity to help needy people acquire expertise and develop the skill to enter the modern economy (#34).
- The free market is the most efficient instrument for utilizing resources and effectively responding to solvent and marketable resources (#34).
- There are human needs which "find no place on the market"; justice requires these fundamental needs not "remain unsatisfied" (#34).
- The State needs to control the market to guarantee that the basic needs of society are satisfied, but the Church "acknowledges the legitimate role of profit" (#35).
- A business firm is a community of persons, endeavoring to meet their basic needs, who form a group at the service of society (#35).
- Human and moral factors are just as important as profit to the life of a business (#35).
- The defeat of "Real Socialism" does not leave capitalism as the only model of economic organization (#35).
- Stronger nations must offer weaker nations the opportunity to take their place in the international order (#35).
- The foreign debt of poorer countries needs to be handled in a way that respects the rights of peoples to subsistence and progress (#35).
- Consumerism has created attitudes and lifestyles which damage the physical and spiritual health of human beings (#36).
- It is necessary to create lifestyles in which the quest for truth, beauty, goodness, and the common good determine choices (#36).
- The mass media has a special role to play in fostering a sense of general responsibility (#36).
- The ecological question emphasizes human responsibility to future generations (#37).
- Social structures can create environments conducive to sin which impede full human realization (#38).
- The family, founded on marriage between a man and a woman, is the sanctuary of life (#39).
- True human alienation happens when a person refuses to transcend the self and live a self-giving life in an authentic human community that is oriented toward God (#41).
- With the collapse of Communism, capitalism, with business, markets, private property, and free human creativity in the economic sector, should be the goal of developing countries. The Marxist solution has failed, but marginalization, exploitation, and alienation still exist in the Third World (#42).
- The Church's social teaching should serve as an orientation, rather than as a model, toward solving problems (#43).
- The principal task of the State is to guarantee the security of individual freedom and private property, as well as to prevent monopolies (#48).
- We must have trust in the human potential of the poor, and in their ability to improve their own conditions through work and economic prosperity (#52).

=== State and culture ===
- The root of modern totalitarianism is found in its denial of the transcendent dignity of the human person. (#44)
- In defending her own freedom, the Church defends the dignity of the human person (#45).
- The Church values any democratic system that ensures its citizens' ability to participate in it (#46).
- Democratic systems need to solidify their foundations by explicitly recognizing certain rights, especially the rights to life, to work, and to establish a family (#47).
- Some democracies have lost the ability to make decisions for the common good (#48).
- States, respecting subsidiarity, need to guarantee freedom, security, and human rights (#48).
- The "Social Assistance" State leads to a loss of human energies; an inordinate increase in bureaucratic public agencies is not the best way to solve these problems (#48).
- The Church—through charity, solidarity, and volunteer work—has always been among the needy (#49).
- A culture achieves its character through the search for truth (#50).
- The Church's contribution to culture is to form human hearts for peace and justice (#51).
- A culture of peace needs to promote development and provide the poor with realistic opportunities (#52).
- This task may necessitate changes in lifestyle that reduce the waste of resources (#52).

=== Humans as the way of the Church ===
- The Church's purpose is the care and responsibility not only for humankind, but also for each individual (#53).
- The Church's social teaching is an instrument of evangelization for salvation (#54).
- The Church receives the "meaning of humankind" from Divine Revelation (#55).
- The Western countries run the risk of seeing the collapse of "Real Socialism" as a victory for their own systems and may fail to make necessary changes in those systems (#56).
- The social basis of the Gospel must function as a basis and motivation for action because witnessing for justice and peace is more credible than logical arguments (#57).
- The option for the poor is not limited to material poverty but encompasses cultural and spiritual poverty as well (#57).
- Love is made concrete in the promotion of justice which requires changes in lifestyles, models of production and consumption, and structures of power (#58).
- Grace is needed for the demands of justice to be met (#59).
- The Church's social teaching enters into dialogue with the other disciplines concerned with humankind (#59).
- People who profess no religious beliefs can contribute to providing the social question an ethical foundation (#60).
- The Church feels obliged to denounce poverty and injustice although her call will not find favor with all (#61).

== See also ==
- Centesimus Annus Pro Pontifice (CAPP)
