= Laborem exercens =

Encyclical by Pope John Paul II, on Catholic social teaching

Laborem exercens Latin for 'Through Work' Encyclical of Pope John Paul II
- Signature date: 14 September 1981
- Subject: On human work, on the 90th anniversary of Rerum novarum
- Number: 3 of 14 of the pontificate
- Text: In Latin; In English

Laborem exercens (Latin: Through Work) is an encyclical written by Pope John Paul II in 1981, on human work. It is part of the larger body of Catholic social teaching, which traces its origin to Pope Leo XIII's 1891 encyclical Rerum novarum.

== Context ==
It had become customary for popes to publish new writings on social issues at ten-year intervals since Rerum novarum, in order to develop the teachings in concert with the evolving social context as a result of the industrial and political revolutions of the 20th Century. Laborem exercens was written in honor of the 90th anniversary, and makes reference to Rerum novarum and to several of the subsequent writings.

The pope was not able to issue the document on the May 15 anniversary because of the assassination attempt two days earlier. He published Laborem exercens a few months later, in September 1981.

Some of the trends mentioned by John-Paul II within the encyclical are:

- Increased use of technology, especially information technology, which John Paul predicted would bring changes comparable to the Industrial Revolution of the previous century.
- Environmental issues. The pope noted that some resources, particularly oil, were becoming scarce. Also, the need to protect the environment was becoming apparent.
- People in the developing world wanted to be more involved in the global economy. John Paul welcomed this trend, but feared it would bring unemployment for many skilled workers as work was distributed more widely.

Not mentioned in the encyclical, but surely in John Paul's mind as he addressed the question of work, was the foundation of Solidarity, an independent trade union with strong Catholic roots, in his native Poland in 1980. John Paul knew Lech Wałęsa, Solidarity's founder, and had met with him more than once during a homecoming visit in 1979.

== Dignity of work ==
Laborem exercens begins with a scriptural argument that work is an essential part of human nature.

The Church finds in the very first pages of the Book of Genesis the source of her conviction that work is a fundamental dimension of human existence on earth. ...When man, who had been created "in the image of God, ... male and female" (Gen 1:27), hears the words: "Be fruitful and multiply, and fill the earth and subdue it" (Gen 1:28), even though these words do not refer directly and explicitly to work, beyond any doubt they indirectly indicate it as an activity for man to carry out in the world.

Work was not a result of Adam's sin, but was given to humanity from the moment of creation. John Paul draws from this passage the conclusion that work is essential to human nature, and that "man is the subject of work."

Man has to subdue the earth and dominate it, because as the "image of God" he is a person, that is to say, a subjective being capable of acting in a planned and rational way, capable of deciding about himself, and with a tendency to self-realization. As a person, man is therefore the subject of work.

John Paul makes a distinction between work and toil. Work is an integral part of human nature; while toil, according to Genesis, was a consequence of sin. The two cannot be separated now, but we can still find the uplifting and fulfilling aspect of work, which John Paul names industriousness.

God's fundamental and original intention with regard to man, whom he created in his image and after his likeness (cf. Gen 1:26-27), was not withdrawn or cancelled out even when man, having broken the original covenant with God, heard the words: "In the sweat of your face you shall eat bread" (Gen 3:19). These words refer to the sometimes heavy toil that from then onwards has accompanied human work. ...And yet, in spite of all this toil—perhaps, in a sense, because of it—work is a good thing for man. ...Through work man not only transforms nature, adapting it to his own needs, but he also achieves fulfilment as a human being and indeed, in a sense, becomes "more a human being".

In the modern world there are many situations that tend to degrade the dignity of work. John Paul called these "threats to the right order of values." For example, when work is treated as a product to be sold, or when workers are considered as an impersonal "work force", then humans are being treated as instruments, and not as the subject of work. Other violations of dignity include unemployment; under-employment of highly skilled workers; inadequate wages to support life; inadequate job security; and forced labor.

John Paul recognized technology as a great benefit, provided it is regarded as a tool and not as a master. However, technology also presents some risks.

Understood in this case not as a capacity or aptitude for work, but rather as a whole set of instruments which man uses in his work, technology is undoubtedly man's ally. It facilitates his work, perfects, accelerates and augments it. It leads to an increase in the quantity of things produced by work, and in many cases improves their quality. However, it is also a fact that, in some instances, technology can cease to be man's ally and become almost his enemy, as when the mechanization of work "supplants" him, taking away all personal satisfaction and the incentive to creativity and responsibility, when it deprives many workers of their previous employment, or when, through exalting the machine, it reduces man to the status of its slave.

== Labor and capital ==
In Laborem exercens, John Paul set forth the following basic priorities as a framework for discussing issues of labor, capital, and property ownership:

- Labor takes precedence over capital.
- People are more important than things.

For contrast, he named two ideas he considered to be errors: materialism and economism. Materialism subordinates people to property; while economism regards the value of human labour only according to its economic purpose. John Paul recommends instead a philosophy of personalism.

The person who works desires not only due remuneration for his work; he also wishes that, within the production process, provision be made for him to be able to know that in his work, even on something that is owned in common, he is working "for himself". This awareness is extinguished within him in a system of excessive bureaucratic centralization, which makes the worker feel that he is just a cog in a huge machine moved from above.

John Paul recognised that in a modern work-space it becomes very complex to establish ownership rights. Natural resources must be acknowledged as gifts of God, belonging to all. Any tools or technology used builds on prior work by countless generations, and continue to be influenced by those who use them in the present day.

If it is true that capital, as the whole of the means of production, is at the same time the product of the work of generations, it is equally true that capital is being unceasingly created through the work done with the help of all these means of production, and these means can be seen as a great workbench at which the present generation of workers is working day after day.

Based upon this view, John Paul proposed a flexible and dynamic view of ownership and economics, and commended arrangements in which workers share in the ownership, such as shareholding by workers, joint ownership, and profit-sharing.

== The indirect employer ==
John Paul examined the rights of workers in the context of a broader picture including both direct and indirect employers. A worker's direct employer is "the person or institution with whom the worker enters directly into a work contract". Indirect employers are other persons, groups and structures that affect or constrain the direct employer.

The concept of indirect employer includes both persons and institutions of various kinds, and also collective labour contracts and the principles of conduct which are laid down by these persons and institutions and which determine the whole socioeconomic system or are its result. ...The indirect employer substantially determines one or other facet of the labour relationship.

As one example, John Paul mentions manufacturing companies in developed countries that purchase raw materials from less developed countries. If the purchasers insist on the lowest possible prices, the workers in another part of the world are indirectly affected. To create labor policies that ensure justice for every worker, it is necessary not only to work with the direct employers, but also to identify and coordinate the indirect employers.

John Paul suggests that this work properly belongs to governments as well as to international organizations such as the United Nations and International Labour Organization.

== Rights of workers ==
=== Full employment ===
"We must first direct our attention to a fundamental issue: the question of finding work, or, in other words, the issue of suitable employment for all who are capable of it." The problem is not a lack of resources—"conspicuous natural resources remain unused"—but poor organization. The criterion of full employment will only be achieved through planning and coordination among all the indirect employers, and a better coordination of education with employment.

=== Wages and benefits ===
John Paul proposed a family wage, That is, enough to support the worker and his family, as a minimum. Women with children have a right either to stay home, or to work outside the home with accommodation for their family responsibility. He also recommended benefits including health insurance, pensions, accident insurance, weekends and vacations as part of a "correct relationship between worker and employer."

=== Unions ===
John Paul re-asserted the importance of workers forming unions. This right is not limited to industrial workers, but belongs to every class and profession. He urges unions to view their struggle as a positive struggle for social justice, rather than a struggle against an opponent. He affirmed the right of unions to strike—"This method is recognized by Catholic social teaching as legitimate in the proper conditions and within just limits"—but "the strike weapon" is an extreme means that should rarely be used.

=== Dignity of agricultural work ===
The pope asserted the dignity of agricultural workers, and some particular difficulties and injustices they face. These include greater isolation; hard physical toil; inadequate wages, benefits, and training; and oppression of those who actually cultivate the soil by wealthy landowners. "In many situations radical and urgent changes are therefore needed in order to restore to agriculture—and to rural people—their just value as the basis for a healthy economy, within the social community's development as a whole."

=== Rights of disabled persons ===
Persons with disabilities have the same rights as other workers: "The disabled person is one of us and participates fully in the same humanity that we possess." The pope acknowledged costs and other barriers, but believes these can be overcome when communities work together with worker's rights being a priority.

=== Emigration and work ===
John Paul expressed concerns about the phenomenon of people who emigrate, either permanently or seasonally, in search of work:

- Emigration means a loss to the person's country of origin.
- Cultural adjustment is often difficult.
- People working away from their country of origin may be vulnerable to exploitation.

Each country should have laws to protect the rights of immigrant workers, so that they receive equal treatment.

== Spirituality of work ==
Laborem exercens concludes with a section regarding the importance of work to Christian spirituality. John Paul encouraged the Church to develop and teach a spirituality of work. He suggested the following components of this:

- Human work and rest are a sharing in the activity of God, the Creator.
- Work is following in the footsteps of Jesus, a carpenter, and the Apostle Paul, a tentmaker. Many other examples of various occupations are given in the Old and New Testaments.
- "By enduring the toil of work in union with Christ crucified for us, man in a way collaborates with the Son of God for the redemption of humanity."
