= Martinus Cobbenhagen =

Dutch Catholic priest, economist and professor (1893–

Martin Cobbenhagen
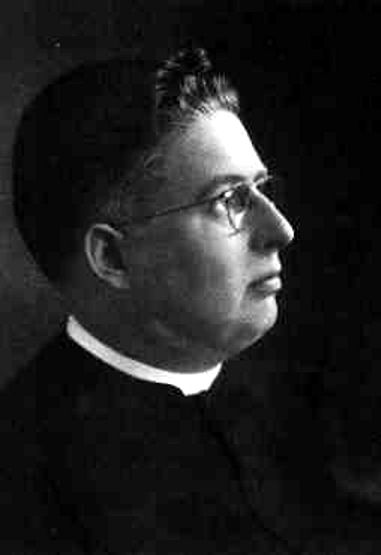
- Cobbenhagen, c. 1930s
- Born: Martinus Joseph Hubertus Cobbenhagen; September 10, 1893; Gulpen, Netherlands
- Died: February 10, 1954 (aged 60); Tilburg, Netherlands
- Education: Erasmus University Rotterdam
- Occupations: Roman Catholic priest; Professor of Economics; Rector Magnificus
- Years active: 1929–1954
- Organization: Tilburg University
- Notable work: The responsibility in commercial enterprise (De verantwoordelijkheid in de onderneming)

Martinus Joseph Hubertus Cobbenhagen (10 September 1893 – 10 February 1954) was a Dutch Roman Catholic priest, economist, professor of economics and rector of Tilburg University.

== Life ==
Cobbenhagen was born on 10 September 1893 in Tilburg. He was the son of Johannes Franciscus Hubertus Cobbenhagen, a candlemaker, and Maria Catharina Hubertina Ramaekers. Cobbenhagen studied at the minor seminary (1906-1913), and at the major seminary (1913-1916 ) in Rolduc. He was ordained a priest in 1917, and continued his studies at the College of Business in Rotterdam (Dutch: Nederlandsche Handels-Hoogeschool, today the Erasmus University Rotterdam), where he completed his master's in economics (1921). After his graduation he was invited as instructor in Rolduc, where he gave classes in business and religion. In 1927 Cobbenhagen defended his PhD in Economics under the supervision of Frans de Vries. His doctoral dissertation was titled The responsibility in commercial enterprise (Dutch: De verantwoordelijkheid in de onderneming).

Cobbenhagen was one of the founders of the Catholic College of Economics (Roomsch Katholieke Handelshoogeschool) in 1927, the predecessor of Tilburg University. From 1929 to 1954 he was Professor of General Theory and History of Economics, and during this period he was elected Rector Magnificus of the same university for three times (1932 – 1933; 1937 – 1938; 1945 – 1946).

From 1935 until his death (1954) he was the editor of Economie, a journal of Tilburg economists having the mission of providing a space for contributions on issues of socio-economic planning.

From July 1942 to April 1943 Cobbenhagen was interned in Haaren with other fellow-professors because of a satirical poem written by Frans van der Ven against Anton Mussert, leader of the NSB party.

In 1947 he was appointed Secret Papal Chamberlain. He died in Tilburg on 10 February 1954.

== Ideas ==
=== Academic contributions ===
Cobbenhagen's academic contributions do not include books but his dissertation. He wrote several manuscripts, classes and book reviews, which were later collected under the title The academic community in Tilburg. Collected essays and talks on academic practice, higher education in economics and the academic lifestyle (De Tilburgsche Hogeschoolgemeenschap. Verzamelde opstellen en voordrachten over wetenschapsbeoefening, economisch hoger onderwijs en academische levensstijl) and published in 1945. These writings constitute the bulk of Cobbenhagen's academic production in economics, including economic doctrines concerning planning, price and wealth distribution.

=== Educational project ===
Cobbenhagen's views on economics were inspired on his knowledge and practice of Catholic moral theology. He was the first in the Netherlands to introduce the idea that ethics and economics are not distinct fields of knowledge. In his educational project, the academic curriculum of economists would combine a solid academic basis with the application of academic knowledge to the practice of socioeconomic life. He proposed an interdisciplinary approach in which the study of economics curriculum included also courses in ethics, philosophy, psychology, and other social sciences. He promoted several academic initiatives to provide students with intellectual stimuli, and for his dedication to the administration of the College and his personal involvement in student life he merited the nickname of father of the college community.

=== Economic thinking ===
One of the principles of Cobbenhagen's economic thinking was that the economy is inherently linked to sociology and psychology. He believed that an economic science isolated from the rest of human knowledge contributed to human materialism and mechanization of life. A second important point was his philosophical and ethical treatment of economic issues, inspired by Catholic moral theology.

The economy was, according to Cobbenhagen, at the crossroad between natural science and the humanities; as such, it should combine quantitative with qualitative elements. In his views the positivist analysis of economic factors (considered quantitatively as measurable entities interacting in a closed system governed by functional relationships) was only one-sided. A comprehensive economic analysis should drive to insights into the essence of things and to assess effectiveness. Thus a price doctrine explains the how price forms and how the equilibrium price originates, but also the why of price formation and equilibrium, and their effectiveness in practice.

According to this practical criterion to evaluate comparative efficiency, Cobbenhagen saw the immediate and material economic prosperity of society as goals in light of a higher ultimate end, which to him was religious. This idea also opened the way to the development of evaluation theories in economic regulation and economic policy.

=== Philosophical view ===
Cobbenhagen's treatment of economic issues was rooted in the philosophical realm of neo-Thomism. According to Cobbenhagen, this approach was normative, and explicitly did not undermine the hardcore of theoretical economics. Accordingly, economics is a science which possesses the economy as its own formal object, that is the study of human behavior aimed at the welfare purpose, which is different from the formal object of ethics as a normative science. In his view, economics could be fully understood in its essence only when studied adopting a philosophical stand, combined with its quantitative and qualitative study.

=== Relationship with Catholic social thought ===
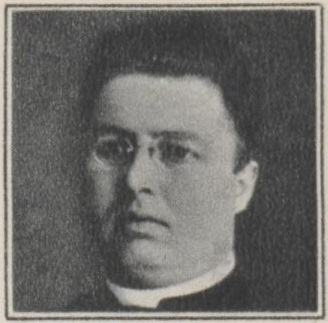
M.J.H. Cobbenhagen

During the interwar period Cobbenhagen worked with other intellectuals, such as prof. J. A. Veraart, Mgr. prof. F. A. Weve, prof. H. A. Kaag and prof. C. P. M. Romme, which shared with him the same Catholic socio-economic ideas. Similar ideas were also the teaching of the Jesuit priest and economist Heinrich Pesch (1854-1926) and are also contained in the papal encyclical letter Quadragesimo anno (1931). Cobbenhagen and his fellow intellectuals advocated solidarism as a socio economic planning principle to overcome both individualist capitalism and state socialism, and a view of society as a community having an organic and hierarchical order and organized according to the principle of subsidiarity.

== See also ==
- Catholic social teaching
- Subsidiarity (Catholic social teaching)
- Distributism
- Solidarism
- Heinrich Pesch
- Quadragesimo anno
