= Christian democracy =

Christian socioeconomic model

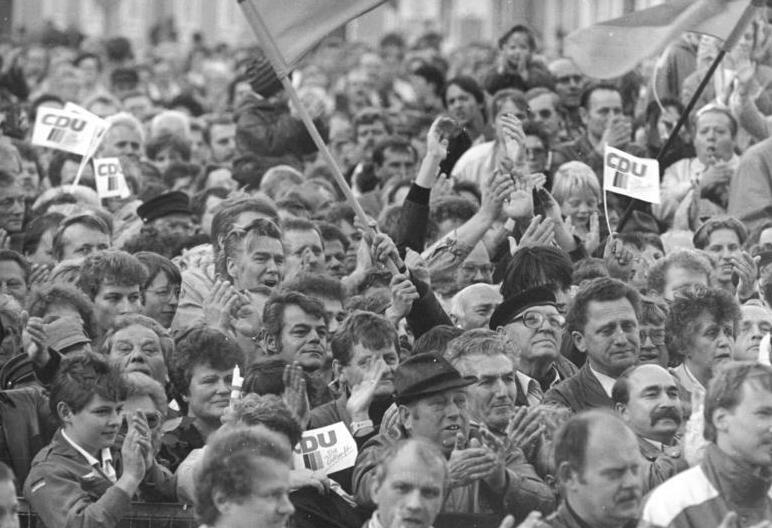
A gathering of supporters of the Christian Democratic Union in Dessau, Germany, 1990

Christian democracy is an ideology inspired by Christian social teaching to respond to the challenges of contemporary society and politics.

Christian democracy has drawn mainly from Catholic social teaching and neo-scholasticism, as well as the Neo-Calvinist tradition within Christianity; it later gained ground with Lutherans and Pentecostals, (Note: Pentecostals have also secured parliamentary representation in countries such as Australia, Colombia, Nicaragua, and Peru, and have helped form Christian political parties that have won parliamentary seats. A noteworthy case is Sweden's Christian Democrats party, not only because it is in a continent where Pentecostals have struggled to make political headway but also because its Pentecostal founder, Lewi Pethrus, who challenged secularization by creating institutions to foster a Christian counterculture, was active at a time when Pentecostals in Sweden or the United States shunned politics.) among other denominational traditions of Christianity in various parts of the world. (Note: "Concurrent with this missionary movement in Africa, both Protestant and Catholic political activists helped to restore democracy to war-torn Europe and extend it overseas. Protestant political activism emerged principally in England, the Lowlands, and Scandinavia under the inspiration of both social gospel movements and neo-Calvinism. Catholic political activism emerged principally in Italy, France, and Spain under the inspiration of both Rerum Novarum and its early progeny and of neo-Thomism. Both formed political parties, which now fall under the general aegis of the Christian Democratic Party movement. Both Protestant and Catholic parties inveighed against the reductionist extremes and social failures of liberal democracies and social democracies.) During the nineteenth century, its principal concerns were to reconcile Catholicism with democracy, to answer the "social question" surrounding capitalism and the working class, and to resolve the tensions between church and state. In the twentieth century, Christian democrats led postwar Western and Southern Europe in building modern welfare states and constructing the European Union. Furthermore, in the late twentieth and early twenty-first century, Christian democracy has gained support in Eastern Europe among former communist states suffering from corruption and stagnation.

On the European left–right political spectrum, Christian democracy has been difficult to pinpoint, as Christian democrats have often rejected liberal economics and individualism and advocated state intervention, while simultaneously defending private property rights against excessive state intervention. This has meant that Christian democracy has historically been considered centre-left on economics and centre-right on many social and moral issues. More recently, Christian democrats have positioned themselves as the centre-right, as with both the European People's Party and European Christian Political Party, with which many Christian democratic parties in Europe are affiliated. Christian democrats support a "slightly regulated market economy", featuring an effective social security system, thus a social market economy.

Worldwide, many Christian democratic parties are members of the Centrist Democrat International. Examples of major Christian democratic parties include the Christian Democratic Union of Germany, the Dutch Christian Democratic Appeal, The Centre in Switzerland, the Spanish People's Party, the Mexican National Action Party, the Austrian People's Party, and the Christian Democratic Party of Chile. Many Christian democratic parties in the Americas are affiliated with the Christian Democrat Organization of America.

Christian democracy continues to be influential in Europe and Latin America, although it is also present in other parts of the world.

== Overview of political viewpoints ==
As a generalization, it can be said that Christian democratic parties in Europe tend to be moderately conservative and, in several cases, form the main conservative party in their respective countries (e.g., in Germany, Spain, Belgium, and Switzerland), such as the Christian Democratic People's Party of Switzerland, the Christian Social Party, the Evangelical People's Party of Switzerland and the Federal Democratic Union of Switzerland. By contrast, Christian democratic parties in Latin America tend to vary in their position on the political spectrum depending on the country they are in, being either more left-leaning, as in the case of the Christian Democratic Party in Chile, or more right-leaning, as in the case of the National Action Party in Mexico. Geoffrey K. Roberts and Patricia Hogwood have noted that "Christian democracy has incorporated many of the views held by liberals, conservatives and socialists within a wider framework of moral and Christian principles."

Christian democrats are usually socially conservative and generally have a relatively skeptical stance towards abortion and same-sex marriage, although some Christian democratic parties have accepted the limited legalization of both. They advocate for a consistent life ethic concerning their opposition to capital punishment and assisted suicide. Christian democrats have also supported the prohibition of drugs. (Note: Conservatives, including the Christian democrats, favor an abstinence strategy that aims at a controlled use of legal drugs such as alcohol, nicotine, and medical drugs, on the one hand, and prohibiting the use of illegal drugs (whether soft or hard), on the other.) Christian democratic parties are often likely to assert their country's Christian heritage and explicitly affirm Christian ethics rather than adopting a more liberal or secular stance; (Note: The main ideological and integrative theme present from the start concerned an emphasis on general Christian values, both as a moral rejection of the atheist, immoral and materialist Nazism and as a manner of distinction vis à vis social democracy. The thrust of the Christian democratic argument was that politics had to be founded in Christianity and that a moral recovery was a prerequisite for social and economic recuperation. It was imperative to concede the importance of Christian ethics after an epoch of such inhuman and atheist cruelty. (Heidenheimer 1960:33–34; Mintzel 1982:133)) at the same time, Christian democratic parties enshrine confessional liberty. Christian democracy fosters an "ecumenical unity achieved on the religious level against the atheism of the government in the Communist countries." (Note: European Christian democracy after the Second World War really represented a common political front against the People's Democracies, that is, Christian democracy was a kind of ecumenical unity achieved on the religious level against the atheism of the government in the Communist countries.)

Christian democrats' views include traditional moral values (on marriage, abortion, prohibition of drugs, etc.), opposition to secularization, opposition to state atheism, a view of the evolutionary (as opposed to revolutionary) development of society, an emphasis on law and order, and a rejection of communism. Christian democrats are open to change (for example, in the structure of society) and not necessarily supportive of the social status quo, and have an emphasis on human rights and individual initiative. A rejection of secularism and an emphasis on the fact that the individual is part of a community and has duties towards it. Christian democrats hold that the various sectors of society (such as education, family, economy, and state) have autonomy and responsibility over their sphere, a concept known as sphere sovereignty. One sphere ought not to dictate the obligations of another social entity; for example, the sphere of the state is not permitted to interfere with raising children, a role that belongs to the sphere of the family. Within the sphere of government, Christian democrats maintain that civil issues should first be addressed at the lowest level of government before being examined at a higher level, a doctrine known as subsidiarity. These concepts of sphere sovereignty and subsidiarity are considered cornerstones of Christian democracy political ideology.

Christian democrats emphasize community, social justice, and solidarity, alongside supporting a welfare state, labor unions, and support for regulation of market forces. Most European Christian democrats reject the concept of class struggle and instead prefer co-determination, while US Christian democrats support a distributist economic system containing widespread distribution of productive property, in particular increased worker ownership (workplace democracy) and management (workers' self-management) of their production.

The Christian democratic welfare state aims at supporting families and often relies on intermediary institutions to deliver social services and social insurance, often with the support of the state.

Christian democrats support the principle of stewardship, which upholds the idea that humans should safeguard the planet for future generations of life. Christian democrats also tend to have a conciliatory view concerning immigration.

== Political philosophy ==
No single author has been recognized by all Christian democrats as the leading Christian democratic thinker, but Jacques Maritain comes closest. Thus, in terms of impact, he is in no way akin to what John Locke is for liberalism, Edmund Burke for conservatism, or Karl Marx for socialism. Other authors critical to forming Christian democratic ideology include Pope Leo XIII, Pope Pius XI, Emmanuel Mounier, Heinrich Pesch, Abraham Kuyper, and Luigi Sturzo.

=== General inspiration ===
==== Neo-scholasticism ====
Christian democracy can trace its philosophical roots to Thomas Aquinas and his thoughts on Aristotelian ontology and the Christian tradition. According to Aquinas, human rights are based on natural law and are defined as the things humans need to function correctly. For example, food is a human right because, without food, humans cannot function properly. Aquinas affirmed that humans are images of the divine, which follows human dignity and equality; all humans are equal because they all share that nature. Aquinas also affirmed the natural reality of family and household, based on the lifelong commitment of husband and wife, perfected with children, a unit that has priority over other communities. Aquinas also argued that public power could legitimately appropriate private owners of their resources for the common good when used for people in genuine need. When Leo XIII became pope, he issued the Papal Encyclical Aeterni Patris, which rehabilitated scholastic philosophy. The pope highlighted Aquinas's views on liberty, authority, laws, justice, and charity in this encyclical.

Aquinas's ideas would later be the foundation for the idea of subsidiarity, alongside the ideas that the state is to serve the people and that there is universal solidarity amongst humanity. A significant Neo-Scholastic was Jacques Maritain, who attempted to reconcile democracy and human rights with Thomist natural law. Maritain argued that human rights are based on natural law and that democracy needs Christianity to succeed. Jacques Maritain would use Thomist ideas of property to reduce inequality, arguing that the state should be involved if individuals do not use their property correctly. Jacques Maritain and Emmanuel Mounier would also use Thomist thinking in developing their idea of personalism.

==== Neo-Calvinism ====
Another intellectual element of Christian democracy was neo-Calvinism. The neo-Calvinist political ideas relied on John Calvin's ideas of the sovereignty of God and common grace. God's sovereignty was particularly useful in light of the French revolution and notions of individual and state sovereignty. It was the basis of sphere sovereignty, which helped the interests of Reformed Christians, which have historically been a minority. In sphere sovereignty, each sphere has its activity area related to God. Within this view of sphere sovereignty, it was the state's role to pursue public justice. Another element was that life is religious, and politics should reflect this.

==== Orthodoxy ====
The development of Orthodox Christian democracy has been held back by the fact that Orthodox Politics has not received church support in the way that Rerum Novarum encouraged Christian democracy, or how early Christian democrats such as Luigi Sturzo received tacit consent for his political activities. Russian Christian democrats, for example, have had to develop a doctrine of democracy.

=== Political thought ===
Academics have noted a few ideas key to Christian democracy, including personalism, solidarity (or some variant of social capitalism), popularism (or some variant of its catch-all nature), notions of "pluralism" (which in a vertical sense relates to subsidiarity, and in a horizontal sense denotes sphere sovereignty) and stewardship.

==== Personalism ====
Personalism is a political doctrine generally linked to Emmanuel Mounier. It focuses on the person, their intellect, responsibilities, and value. It stresses that humans are free beings with dignity and political rights, but these rights must be used for the common good. It also stresses that true human freedom is used in line with God's will. It is against the individualist and collectivist notions of humanity. It also stresses that people become full when they are members of their communities. In practical policy, it leads to a few conclusions:

- Human life is sacred and is an end in itself. It is, therefore, against abortion and euthanasia.
- The family unit is an essential part of society and must be defended.
- Traditional gender roles must be respected; this leads to a rejection of same-sex marriages.
- Freedom is not a license for Moral permissiveness.

Personalism has generally been the underlying basis in Christian democracy that leads to human rights, especially in relation to a right to life, a right to family and a right to aid, a right to suffrage, freedom of conscience, and freedom of religion.

Modern personalist views also are inspired by ecologist values. Rowan Williams contrasts personalism, which he describes as a relation between humans and God, to modern-day capitalism, which is focused only on endless economic growth, which is harmful to the natural environment.

==== Solidarity and social capitalism ====
The Christian democratic political economy has not tethered itself to one "third way" between capitalism and socialism, but rather various ways between capitalism and socialism. Over time, Christian democrats moved from solidarism to a social market economy.

Initially, many Catholic political movements in the 19th century opposed capitalism and socialism equally, as both were based on materialism and social conflict. Initially, the system that Catholics advocated was one of corporatism, based on bringing back a guild-organized economy. The idea was a society where individuals were organized by their economic position. In these corporatist systems, the fathers were the head of families. One of these conceptions was that of Franz von Baader, who advocated for proletariat enfranchisement in the corporatist system. Baader is recognized as the first person to advocate for workplace codetermination. Codetermination would become a key point of unity amongst the Christian democratic trade unions. In the 19th century and early 20th century, the Lutheran social Christians advocated an authoritarian view of corporatism, and the Neo-Calvinist corporatist idea has been credited as an inspiration for the polder system that currently exists in the Netherlands. Many of these corporatisms would advance the idea of replacing the elected parliament with corporative parliament recognizing the various corporate estates of the nation; industrialists, small businesses, peasants, landowners, workers, etc. The papal encyclical Rerum Novarum would recognize some of the principles behind corporatism.

The Christian democratic notion of corporatism was found within Heinrich Pesch's solidarism. Pesch's solidarism argued for international solidarity based on shared humanity, national solidarity based on shared nationality, familiar solidarity for family members, and class and cross-class solidarity based on shared interests in the workplace. This latter solidarity focused on occupational associations advancing collective interests, codetermination, and a "third house of parliament" that would advise on economic matters. Heinrich Pesch's idea of corporatism would be a qualified notion of subsidiarity. Pesch's ideas would be influential in the Papal Encyclical Quadragesimo Anno, given that Pesch's disciple Oswald von Nell-Breuning would draft the document. Quadragesimo Anno was significant in legitimatizing the push for a corporatist system and subjected it to the notion of subsidiarity. Around this time, corporatism became increasingly prominent among young Catholics frustrated with parliamentary politics and, in many instances, would inspire authoritarian and fascist regimes movements in Austria, France, Spain, Portugal, and Germany. Eventually, corporatism fell out of the political debate due to this association with authoritarian and fascist regimes.

Another economic idea within Christian democracy is the social market economy, which is widely influential across much of continental Europe. The social market is an essentially free market economy based on a free price system and private property. However, it supports government activity to promote competitive markets with a comprehensive social welfare system and effective public services to address social inequalities resulting from free market outcomes. The market is seen not as an end but as a means of generating wealth to achieve broader social goals and maintain societal cohesion. The basis of the social market economy is ordoliberalism, or German neoliberalism, an idea related to thinkers such as Walter Eucken, Franz Böhm, Ludwig Erhard, Wilhelm Röpke and Alfred Müller-Armack. Ordoliberals viewed the concentration of power as a significant danger to liberty. They desired an economic constitution that would ensure competition in markets and free decisions, where people are uninfluenced by the government. As a result of the economic constitution, this model is mildly corporatist. This model of capitalism, sometimes called Rhine–Alpine capitalism or social capitalism, is contrasted with Anglo-American capitalism or enterprise capitalism. Whereas the Anglo-capitalist model aims to remove restrictions on capitalism and enable individual prosperity, the Rhenish Model embeds the market into the social framework, with the goals of nation-building and of taking care of citizens.

Beginning in the 1980s, European Christian democratic parties have partially adopted "neo-liberal" policies. However, Christian democrats in the American Solidarity Party instead adopted distributism. The promotion of the Christian democratic concepts of sphere sovereignty and subsidiarity led to the creation of corporatist welfare states throughout the world that continue to exist to this day. (Note: The Christian democrats promoted a corporatist welfare state, based on the principles of the so-called "sphere sovereignty" and "subsidiarity" in social policy.) In keeping with the Christian democratic concepts of the cultural mandate and the preferential option for the poor, Christian justice is viewed as demanding that the welfare of all people, especially the poor and vulnerable, must be protected because every human being has dignity, being made in the image of God. In many countries, Christian democrats organized labor unions that competed with communist and social democratic unions, in contrast to conservatism's stance against worker organizations. In solidarity with these labor unions, in Belgium, for example, Christian democrats have lobbied for Sunday blue laws that guarantee workers and civil servants a day of rest in line with historic Christian Sabbath principles. Another example of a Christian-inspired workers' movement is the Catholic Worker Movement established by Dorothy Day, which not only fought for better working standards, but also contributed to promoting the idea of pacifism and a just war.

==== Popularism ====
Popolarismo (or popularism) is a political doctrine conceived by Don Luigi Sturzo, (Note: Sturzo outlined his conception of popularism as follows: "Popularism is democratic, but it differs from liberal democracy in that it denies the individualist and centralising system of the State and wishes the State to be organic and decentralised. It is liberal (in the wholesome sense of the word) because it takes its stand on the civil and political liberties, which it upholds as equal for all, without party monopolies and without persecution of religion, races or classes. It is social in the sense of a radical reform of the present capitalist system, but it parts company with Socialism because it admits of private property while insisting on the social function of such property. It proclaims its Christian character because to-day there can be no ethics or civilisation other than Christian. Popularism was the antithesis of the totalitarian State.") however in reality this was Christian democracy in the political sphere. The papal encyclical Graves de communi re prohibited Christian democracy to be a political ideology, and so Sturzo used the term popularism instead. Popularism helped European Catholics come to accept democracy, and so the idea has been linked to Christian democratic ideas of democracy, which Sturzo Defined as:

The political and social system resting on the free, organic participation of the whole people in the common good.

Academics have tied the idea of popularism to the way Christian democratic parties encompass sections of the whole population. This results from the inherent religious center allowing cut across class divisions. In realization of this, Christian democratic parties tend to invoke the title "People's Parties". Academic Carlo Invernizzi Accetti links the idea of popularism to proportional representation, pillarization, and consociational democracy.

==== Pluralism ====
The Christian democratic notion of pluralism is about how humans are generally embedded in a social framework. John Witte, explaining the origin of Christian democracy, describes pluralism thus:

Both Protestant and Catholic parties inveighed against the reductionist extremes and social failures of liberal democracies and social democracies. Liberal democracies, they believed, had sacrificed the community for the individual; social democracies had sacrificed the individual for the community. Both parties returned to a traditional Christian teaching of "social pluralism" or "subsidiarity", which stressed the dependence and participation of the individual in family, church, school, business, and other associations. Both parties stressed the responsibility of the state to respect and protect the "individual in community".

Sphere sovereignty stresses the horizontal element; social communities have roles they must uphold and certain liberty and autonomy. Here the government had the role of policing the spheres. Subsidiarity is the vertical element, where the state has the role of protecting and regulating the spheres. The state must not interfere if these communities are behaving effectively. This also means that a state can intervene when these communities are not competent. In practice, subsidiarity has been used to justify the creation of international organizations, as higher international authorities need to exist to police nation-states.

==== Stewardship ====
The idea of stewardship has traditionally been linked to managerial skills regarding property and income; Stewardship can be found in neo-Calvinist Abraham Kuyper's works, where it relates to a person's responsibilities over what is entrusted to them, especially their property. In Social Catholic circles in the 1970s, stewardship was explicitly linked to environmental matters. Stewardship was found in the first programs of the Christian Democratic Appeal, and from here alongside the works of American bishops, the idea would spread to other Christian democratic parties. They view competent and efficient government as emblematic of a "just steward", which includes just stewardship over environmental matters. Pope Francis took a firm stance on environmentalism in the papal encyclical Laudato Si in 2015. Here, the idea of stewardship comes from the correct translation of Genesis, where God entrusts man with stewardship of the earth.

== History ==
=== 19th century ===
The origins of Christian democracy go back to the French Revolution, where initially, French republicanism and the Catholic Church were deeply hostile to one another as the revolutionary governments had attacked the church, confiscated the church's lands, persecuted its priests, and attempted to establish new religions, first the Cult of Reason and then the Cult of the Supreme Being. After the decades following the French Revolution, the Catholic Church saw the rise of liberalism as a threat to Catholic values. The rise of capitalism and the resulting industrialization and urbanization of society were seen to be destroying traditional communal and family life. According to the Catholic Church, liberal economics promoted selfishness and materialism with the liberal emphasis on individualism, tolerance, and free expression, enabling all kinds of self-indulgence and permissiveness to thrive. Consequently, for much of the 19th century, the Catholic Church was hostile to democracy and liberalism.

This hostility to democracy and liberalism would be challenged by liberal Catholics who believed the alliance between the church and aristocracy was a barrier to the church's mission. Initially, this group desired to reconcile the Catholics with the state of modern politics, getting Catholics involved in parties, public action, and parliamentarianism. This, however, was not an endorsement of democracy, and the liberal Catholics maintained they did not adhere to liberalism. Eventually, the movement's leading figures, such as Félicité de La Mennais, would become more accepting of democracy. The group came to be associated with a desire for a free press, freedom of association and worship, and free education.

Around this time, Catholic social thought developed, with social Catholic theologians and activists advocating the interests of workers in society. Some activists, such as Frédéric Ozanam, the Society of St Vincent de Paul founder, were more amenable to liberal democracy. Ozanam criticized economic liberalism and the commodification of labor and argued that charity was insufficient to deal with these problems and that labor associations and state intervention were needed. Italian Popular Party leader Luigi Sturzo credits Ozanam as the first Christian democrat. One of the more influential theologians in Germany was Wilhelm von Ketteler, who encouraged Catholics to accept the modern state. Ketteler argued for productive associations with profit sharing, Christian trade unions, and general workers' rights.

In the 1870s, Catholic political movements arose independently of the Catholic Church to defend Catholic interests from the liberal states. In Europe, generally, the liberal states desired to wrestle control over the Catholic education system; however, in Germany and Italy, this was a direct attack against the church. The Catholic political movements specifically opposed liberal secularism and state control of education; the parties that came out of these movements include the Centre Party (Germany), the Catholic Party (Belgium), various Catholic parties in the Netherlands, and the Christian Social Party (Austria). Initially, most of these parties accepted the anti-liberal beliefs of the Catholic Church at the time; many Catholics behind these movements believed all spheres of life should be regulated by religion. These movements were initially built by ultramontanes, were against the liberal view that church and state must be separated, and used the term "Christian democracy" in opposition to liberal democracy. The Centre Party in Germany seems to be an exception to this trend in that they defended the Catholic Church through an appeal to liberal freedoms and democracy. Additionally, the Centre Party, inspired by Ketteler, supported social legislation.

Despite the thoroughly pro-Catholic position of these movements, the church itself resisted the movements, seeing them as a challenge to the church's control of the laity. Over time, the impact of electoral politics on these parties pushed them to be more accepting of liberal democracy. To form effective political coalitions, these parties evolved from Catholic parties to parties inspired by Christianity and turned to voters, not the Catholic Church, for legitimacy. During this time, the Catholic parties took an inter-class nature, such that they comprised trade unionists, landlords, industrialists, peasants, and artisans, which academics have linked to the notion of popularism.

Protestant confessional politics was more wide and varied. The most significant movement was in the Netherlands, where Reformed, neo-Calvinist Protestants founded the Anti-Revolutionary Party. Similarly to the Catholics, this party was formed out of similar concerns with liberal control of education. The party was against the ideas of the French revolution, and its founder, Abraham Kuyper, held that the government derived its authority from God, not from the people. However, Kuyper and the Anti-Revolutionary Party did support organic democratic representation and promoted universal household suffrage. In Germany, this element came from the Lutheran Adolf Stoecker, who established the Christian Social Party, and those who followed him. The Christian social movement aimed to challenge Marxist socialism, so Stoecker supported pro-worker economic policies to win over the working class. However, when this failed, Stoecker turned to anti-Semitism. In Switzerland, Stoecker and his fellow allies generated some interest in Protestant political organization, but Protestants largely accepted the predominance of liberalism, so there was only minor growth of a Protestant political movement.

=== Between Rerum novarum and World War II ===
The papacy of Pope Leo XIII was a turning point in the development of Christian democracy, and he attempted to infuse democracy and liberalism with Catholic values. In the papal encyclical Rerum novarum in 1891, Pope Leo XIII recognized workers' misery and argued for means to improve workers' conditions. He also attacked economic liberalism and condemned the rise of socialism, and generally encouraged a corporatist approach to labor relations. Rerum novarum would provide Catholic labor movements with an intellectual platform and would coincide with the rise of Christian trade unions across Europe. It was the catalyst for the beginning of Christian democracy in France, Italy, and Austria. The same year as the release of Rerum Novarum, Abraham Kuyper organized the Christian Social Congress alongside the Protestant workers' movement, where Kuyper outlined their social principles and policy. These actions reinforced the push for Christian social action in the Netherlands. In Graves de communi re, the pope would protest against using Christian democracy as a political label, preferring it to describe a social movement.

Some academics consider the Catholic political parties around this time to be essentially Catholic and not Christian democratic. However, others consider the new Italian People's Party and the Popular Democratic Party (France) Christian democratic. These parties advocated political liberties, religious liberties, economic reform, and social partnership, policies to support democracy and internationalism. The Italian People's Party also advocated for regionalism and proportional representation. At the beginning of the Weimar Republic, Adam Stegerwald attempted to reform the Centre Party into a Christian democratic party, uniting Catholics and Protestants. In Belgium, the rising workers' movement came to form the increasingly powerful Christian democratic faction of the Catholic Party. This period also saw other Catholic parties forming; Bavarian Catholics broke away and formed the Bavarian People's Party due to the Centre Party's participation in establishing the Weimar Republic. In Switzerland, Catholics formed the Swiss Conservative People's Party, which, as a party, was divided between three competing demographics; rural Catholics who wanted greater regional independence, Catholic workers who wanted economic reform, and the more conservative groups who opposed democracy. Overall, the party was held together by the Catholic faith and anti-socialist and anti-liberal tendencies. In Ireland, Fianna Fáil was founded as a Catholic political party. Fine Gael, Fianna Fáil, and Labor would all be avenues for Christian democracy in the post-war period.

In the early 20th century, Protestant confessional politics developed further. In Weimar Germany, Stoecker's Christian social party joined the German National People's Party as its labor wing in 1918. The Christian social parliamentarians from this party would then leave in 1929 to form the Christian Social People's Service (CSVD). Protestant workers' movements in Switzerland gradually developed mutual aid funds into an independent trade union movement. Around this time, Swiss Protestants formed the Evangelical People's Party. The 1930s saw the rise of the Christian People's Party in Norway. It was built on the work of Pietist Lutherans, and the party was initially founded to defend the country's Christian heritage against the rise of secularization. There was cooperation between the Protestant and Catholic parties during this period. The Catholic and Protestant parties would form joint governments in the Netherlands and Germany. However, this cooperation did not challenge the underlying differences between the movements; in Germany, there was tension from cooperation with Protestants, while in the Netherlands, the Anti-Revolutionaries would not support pro-Vatican policies.

A significant factor that helped Christian democracy during this period was the lay Catholic Action movements. These organizations stress the apostolate of the laity, which is the role of everyday Catholics in spreading the faith. In practice, these movements helped support the Christian trade unions and Christian democratic parties across Europe. In Italy, Catholic Action supported the Italian Popular Party, and the rise of Mussolini would act as an anti-fascist force. Catholic Action would later help the post-war Christian democracy. Likewise, Catholic Action would work in the resistance in France and help found the MRP.

In 1931, Pope Pius XI released the encyclical Quadragesimo anno, which was released on the 40th anniversary of Rerum novarum, and aimed to clarify the subsequent social doctrine of the church. The encyclical doubled down on the pronouncements of Rerum novarum on economic liberalism and socialism. The attack against socialism was broadened to include moderate socialism, and within the encyclical, the pope outlined a corporatist structure of society based on the notion of "subsidiarity". However, the pope would stress the autonomy of this corporatist system to distinguish it from fascism. This Quadragesimo Anno would come to influence the economic programs of Catholic parties of the time, such as the Popular Democratic Party, and the Dutch Roman Catholic State Party, alongside influencing Belgian Catholics. The Centre Party, Christian Social Party, and Swiss Conservative People's Party already advocated corporatism based on economists such as Heinrich Pesch, Oswald von Nell-Breuning, and Karl von Vogelsang. In Germany and Austria, Quadragesimo anno renewed the vigor for corporatism. In Ireland, Political Catholics would pursue a policy of vocationalism taken directly from Quadragesimo anno. This vocationalism was most evident in the corporatist nature of the Irish upper house.

Across Europe, the Catholic and Protestant parties faced the threat of fascism. Amidst the rise of Fascism in Italy, the Italian People's Party, under Sturzo, attempted to challenge Mussolini by forming a coalition with the socialist party. Sturzo was ordered by the Catholic Church in 1923 to disband his party and exit politics. Poor electoral performance in 1924 would make Sturzo give party leadership to Alcide De Gasperi and go into exile. Once in power, the fascists disbanded the Italian People's Party. This would precede the signing of the Lateran Treaty between the Catholic Church and the Italian fascists in 1929. The Centre Party and the CSVD would face the rise of the Nazi Party in Germany. Once the Nazis attained power in 1933, they attempted to take total power with the Enabling Act. Internally, the Centre Party was divided on the Enabling Act, but many became persuaded that Hitler would not eliminate the Reichstag. Comparatively, the historical anti-Semitism of the Protestant Christian Social movement left the Christian Socials susceptible to Nazism. The Nazi Party would infiltrate the Protestant unions linked to CSVD in 1931. Eventually, both parties would sign the Enabling Act, and both parties would summarily dissolve. In Austria, the Christian Socials would have already disbanded before Germany annexed Austria. In Austria, a short civil war between authoritarians and social democrats would divide the Christian Socials, many of which would help build the authoritarian state. Outside of Italy, Germany and, Austria, many Catholic and Protestant parties would ultimately be dissolved when Nazi Germany invaded the rest of Europe in World War II. Many Christian democrats would assist in the resistance in France.

=== The post-war period ===
After World War II, "both Protestant and Catholic political activists helped to restore democracy to war-torn Europe and extend it overseas". Christian resistors were significant in establishing post-war Christian democracy movements in France, Germany, and Italy. The collapse of fascism led to the discrediting of the radical right. In Germany, conservatism was associated with reactionary and anti-democratic attitudes. The Christian democrats could claim to be untainted by fascism and thereby draw together conservative Catholics and bourgeois Protestants. In both Germany and Italy, the Christian democratic parties encompassed former conservatives. The Christian democratic parties dominated the post-war scene. In Italy, the new Christian Democratic Party led the coalition government under Alcide De Gasperi, and in France, the Popular Republican Movement became the largest party in parliament in 1946. In Germany, France, and Italy, the Christian democratic parties helped establish their respective countries' constitutions. Between the 1940s and 1990s, Christian democratic parties were in power across western Europe; "In Germany they were in power for 36 years out of 50, in Italy for 47 years out of 52, in Belgium 47 years out of 53, and in Netherlands for 49 years of 53; even in France they were influential up to 1962". After the fall of the Berlin Wall and the collapse of the U.S.S.R., Christian democratic parties made electoral strides in Central and Eastern Europe, with developments in Poland paralleling a resurgence of Christian democracy in other Central and Eastern European countries with Catholic majorities or significant Catholic minorities.

In the post-war period, Christian democratic parties became more conservative, partially in response to communism and secularism. The Christian democrats also won the women's vote in their respective countries due to the pro-family policies of Christian democrats. Christian democrats pursued decentralization policies during this time, encouraging regionalism in Germany, Italy, and Belgium. This was sought with increased favor as a result of experiencing fascism. Christian democratic parties were also crucial in pushing for codeterminative works councils and workers on boards during this time. Despite this initial power, cracks started to appear; Christian democracy in France declined substantially, as Popular Republican Movement and its successors quickly fell apart. French Christian democrats would ultimately become subsumed into Gaullist parties.

Similarly, minor Christian democratic parties such as the People's Democratic Party (PDP) would rise in post-Franco Spain. However, these movements were too divided and lacked the political necessity of religious cleavages to play a dominant role in Spanish democracy. These Christian democratic parties would fail, and the Christian democrats would join the Spanish Popular Party.

Protestant Christian democracy developed in multifaceted ways in the post-war period. In Germany, it arose amongst the Lutheran ordoliberals. These Lutherans looked to Christian theologians such as Karl Barth and Dietrich Bonhoeffer to path a way that obeyed worldly authority but also challenged the Nazi regime. The core of the ordoliberal ideology was a strong state that enabled market competition. During the war, the ordoliberals worked with Bonhoeffer to develop a political and socio-economic plan for the post-war period, and after the war, they joined with Catholics to form the Christian Democratic Union. The ordoliberals termed their vision a "social market economy", a vision the Catholics would also come to champion. In Sweden, it arose amongst the Pentecostals, where it coalesced in the Christian Democrats, founded in 1964 as a reaction to secularization. The Finnish Christian Democrats, formed in 1957, and the Danish Christian People's Party, formed in 1970, defended Christian schooling and dissented against secular trends such as atheism and liberal abortion policies. The Nordic Christian democratic parties did not represent the Lutheran state church but non-conformist Christians and lay activists within the Lutheran state church. In the Netherlands, the Protestant Anti-Revolutionary Party and Christian Historical Union joined the Catholic People's Party to form Christian Democratic Appeal.

European Christian democrats were a significant force in the creation of the European Union. At the beginning of the European project, three significant men were Konrad Adenauer, Robert Schuman, and Alcide De Gasperi, all Christian democrats. When the Rome Treaty was signed, Christian democrats were the leading governments in four of the six countries, Germany, Italy, Belgium, and Luxembourg, and were a part of the coalition government in the Netherlands at the time. At least until the mid-1980s, social democrats were hostile to the institutions of the European Communities – even in the 1970s, Swedish Prime Minister Olof Palme called the European Commission "conservative", "capitalist", "clerical", and "colonialist". Indeed, the European Union has the ideas of subsidiarity and personalism embedded within it. The influence of Christian democracy on the European Union is such that one academic has called the European Union a "Christian democracy". Alongside the European Union was the development of European Christian democratic parties. This appeared in the 1940s with the Nouvelles Equipes Internationales, which would evolve into the European Union of Christian Democrats in 1965, and, finally, the European People's Party in 1976.

=== 21st century ===
Christian democratic parties no longer have as much power in European politics. Indeed, in Italy, the Christian democratic party collapsed. The reasons for the decline in Christian democracy are multifaceted, partly due to European secularization and the loss of a voting base. The death of communism and the rise of neo-liberalism have also dented the movement, and the 2008 financial crisis has also shown flaws in Christian democratic welfare. Furthermore, immigration and the rise of populism have further put pressure on Christian democracy, as it is torn between the right's call for restrictions, the businesses' call for an open labor market, and the religious call for more charity to immigrants.

Some Christian democratic parties, particularly in Europe, no longer emphasize religion and have become much more secular in recent years. Recently, many minor Christian democratic parties, such as the Christian Union, and others across Europe, did not feel represented in the existing political establishment, so they formed a political organization in the European Christian Political Movement. These parties stressed the Christian history of Europe alongside advocating for traditional Christian values and economic and environmental justice.

Many Muslim parties in Muslim countries have looked to the Christian democratic tradition for inspiration. The most notable is Turkey's ruling Justice and Development Party (usually known by the Turkish acronym AKP, for Adalet ve Kalkınma Partisi), which is Islamic and has moved towards the tradition. However, this link is questioned, given that AKP's movement toward Christian democracy may be to curry the favor of European parties in European integration, something the European Christian democrats ultimately shot down. Other Islamic groups that have been linked include the Democratic League of Kosovo and Mohammad Morsi in Egypt. Some Muslim democratic parties embraced by Christian democrats are the National Awakening Party (Indonesia) and the Lakas–Christian Muslim Democrats (Philippines), who have joined the Centrist Democrat International.

== Outside Western Europe ==
The international organization of Christian democratic parties, the Centrist Democrat International (CDI), formerly known as the Christian Democratic International, is the second-largest international political organization in the world, after the Socialist International. European Christian democratic parties have a regional organization, the European People's Party, which forms the largest group in the European Parliament: the European People's Party Group.

=== Latin America ===
Early Christian democracy in Latin America formed in the early 20th century, and these parties were generally conservative, and their main aim was to protect the interests of the Catholic church. These parties viewed Christianity as the origin and soul of democratic values and advocated an organic conception of society, decentralization, and corporatism. Christian democrats would become more progressive in the 1960s and 1970s, partially due to the consequences of the Second Vatican Council between 1961 and 1963. This led to the growth of liberation theology in Latin American Catholicism, which stressed class conflict over the Christian democratic class mediation. Furthermore, due to the US policy against socialism in Latin America, Christian democratic parties could position themselves as progressive and demand social reforms.

Furthermore, Christian democrats accepted modernism and technocracy and began to advocate centralized planning. In the 1980s, due to international trends such as the Washington consensus, Christian democrats accepted neoliberal policies in their nations, leading to future electoral losses. Throughout this period, Christian democratic parties have played a force for democracy, such as COPEI, which helped establish Democratic Venezuela, and the PDC in Chile, the main opposition to Pinochet. In the 1980s, there had been multiple Christian democratic presidents including Vinicio Cerezo in Guatemala (1986–1991; DCG), José Napoleón Duarte in El Salvador (1984–1989; PDC) Luis Herrera Campins in Venezuela (1979–1984; COPEI) and Osvaldo Hurtado (1981–1984; DP) and León Febres Cordero (1984–1988; PSC) in Ecuador.

Christian democracy has been especially important in Chile (see Christian Democratic Party of Chile) and Venezuela (see COPEI – Christian Democratic Party of Venezuela), among others, and partly also in Mexico, starting with the ascendancy of President Vicente Fox in 2000, followed by Felipe Calderón (see National Action Party (Mexico)). Cuba counts several Christian democratic political associations on the island and in exile. Perhaps the most significant is Movimiento Cristiano de Liberación (MCL), led by Cuban dissident Oswaldo Payá, who was killed in a tragic automobile accident in the summer of 2012 and has been nominated for the Nobel Peace Prize. In Uruguay, the Christian Democratic Party of Uruguay, although numerically small, was instrumental in creating the leftist Broad Front in 1971.

=== Central and Eastern Europe ===
==== Poland ====
Christian democratic movements in Poland formed in 1890 and gained increasing prominence from 1916, such that various Christian democratic movements coalesced into the Christian Democratic Party in 1919. The party's economic program drew from Rerum Novarum and later Quadragesimo anno. The party would encourage cross-class solidarity, co-ownership, and co-determination. For the first half of the 1920s, the party had considerable influence in government, providing cabinet members and a prime minister. After the coup d'état in 1926, the party's influence worsened. The party would eventually side with the opposition centre-left and unite with National Workers' Party to form the Labour Party in 1937. Wojciech Korfanty, Karol Popiel and Józef Haller were the most significant members of the Christian democratic movement.

During World War II many politicians of the Labour Party organised a resistance movement known as The Union, which was later integrated with Home Army in 1942. The Labour Party continued to exist in exile till the fall of communism (its prominent member Stanisław Gebhart was active in organising the European and international Christian democratic movement), procommunist faction existed in Poland until 1950.

After World War II, the agrarian Polish People's Party, the only opposition party in communist Poland had large Christian democratic factions, which had lost their influence after the party was defeated and forced to unite with communist peasant parties. Progovernmental organizations referring to Christian values, like PAX association represented interests of the communist block rather than Christian democratic values.

The Christian democratic movement experienced a revival during the Solidarity uprising. Lech Wałęsa and Tadeusz Mazowiecki were considered as Christian democratic leaders within the Solidarity movement. The democratic opposition was openly supported by the Catholic Church led by John Paul II, but also by Christian organisations like the Club of Catholic Intelligentsia. After the fall of communism, many Christian democratic parties were emerged on the right (like Centre Agreement, Christian-Peasant Party, Conservative People's Party or the revived Labour Party), while more centre-oriented Christian factions teamed up with liberals to form the Democratic Union, later the Freedom Union. In the late 1990s, conservative and Christian democratic parties formed Solidarity Electoral Action.

In 1997, former president of Poland Lech Wałęsa formed Christian Democracy of the Third Polish Republic party, which however never gained any significant popularity and was formally dissolved in 2023.

Since 2005, the Polish political scene has been dominated by two major parties, liberal conservative Civic Platform and right-wing Law and Justice, both with significant Christian democratic factions. With the Civic Platform shifting over time to social-liberal positions and Law and Justice towards right-wing populism, the agrarian Polish People's Party became a significant Christian-oriented voice. The Polish People's Party has abandoned its former left-wing policy to form Christian democratic and conservative political projects like Polish Coalition and Third Way.

==== Romania ====
Christian democracy has developed in countries with Eastern Orthodox majorities in unique and disparate ways. Romania has seen small Christian parties – such as the National Peasants' Party in 1926, which promoted Christian morality, democracy and social justice. In the 1980s, Corneliu Coposu, would affiliate the party with the CDI, and on the fall of Communism, would re-enroll the party as the Christian Democratic National Peasants' Party in 1990. This new party advocated market economies with social protection, subsidiarity and citizens liberties. Corneliu Coposu, hoped Romania would become "the Capital of Orthodox Christian-Democracy".

After the fall of communism Christian democratic tendencies are mostly visible in the platform of the centre-right National Liberal Party and the eurofederalist, national conservative People's Movement Party.

==== Russia ====
Russian Christian democracy was beset by personality clashes between leaders, and Russian Christian democracy was bifurcated into two ideological camps. The first wanted to import a carbon copy of Western Christian democracy into the Russian political scene, such as the RCDU, CDUR and RCPD. The Christians that make up these groups are not from Orthodoxy themselves – they are newly Orthodox Christians or Protestants. The largest party of the other group was the Russian Christian Democratic Movement, which attempted to unify democracy with orthodoxy on the basis of statism and patriotism (73–74). In practice they acted as democrats or patriots, depending on circumstances. It would gradually move to the right, adopt and ally with orthodox-monarchists and national-republicans. The party would eventually leave the democratic group.

==== Post-Iron Curtain and former Yugoslavia ====
After the end of the socialist experience in Central and Eastern Europe, and especially with European integration, many parties from former socialist countries become members of the Christian democratic umbrella organization, the European People's Party (EPP). Examples include the KDU-ČSL in the Czech Republic, the Croatian Democratic Union in Croatia, the Civic Platform in Poland, etc. Hungary's Fidesz was part of the EPP from 2004 to 2021; its leader, Viktor Orbán, claimed Hungary to be a "Christian democracy". Many of those parties pushed for a re-traditionalization of society, pro-family policies, a Bismarckian welfare state, and identity politics based on Christianity while maintaining a pro-European integration attitude. The ideals of Christian democracy also inspire other Euroskeptic parties, and they are grouped under the umbrella of the European Conservatives and Reformists Party; an example is Law and Justice in Poland.

=== Greece ===
In Greece, New Democracy is deemed to be a Christian democratic party – though it often moves back and forth from Christian democracy to liberal conservatism intermittently.

=== United Kingdom ===
Christian democracy in the UK was sporadic and un-unified. One group was the Catholic Social Guild, established in 1909 to propagate a Catholic alternative to socialism. They encouraged Catholics to work within the Labour Party and push policies for families, a living wage, social partnership in industry, and property diffusion. Another group was the People and Freedom Group, established during Sturzo's exile in the UK. They were a largely middle-class organization set up in response to pain felt by Catholics during the Spanish Civil War. They published their manifesto, "For Democracy" in 1939. The Catholic Worker was another Christian democratic group at the time.

In general, British Christian democrats, especially those in the People and Freedom Group, attempted to push the Labour Party towards Christian democracy, and they made a significant attempt to portray Christian democracy as left-wing. Ultimately the People and Freedom Group failed to do so and became disillusioned with the Labour Party. On the other hand, the Catholic Worker aimed to make Labour policies acceptable to Catholics.

More recently, Christian Peoples Alliance is a Christian democratic party that emphasises the country's Christian heritage and advocates for the principles of "active compassion, respect for life, social justice, wise stewardship, empowerment, and reconciliation."

Another recent attempt is that of Christian Democracy UK, a pressure group founded in September 2025 by 17-year-old Max Stenner from Dorset.

=== Australia ===
Christian democratic parties in Australia include the Democratic Labor Party and, arguably, the disbanded Christian Democratic Party.

The Democratic Labor Party was formed in 1955 as a split from the Australian Labor Party (ALP). In Victoria and New South Wales, state executive members, parliamentarians, and branch members associated with the Industrial Groups or B. A. Santamaria and "The Movement" (and therefore strongly identified with Roman Catholicism) were expelled from the party. They formed the Democratic Labor Party (DLP). Later in 1957, a similar split occurred in Queensland, with the resulting group joining the DLP. The party also had sitting members from Tasmania and New South Wales at various times, though it was much stronger in the states mentioned above. The Democratic Labor Party (DLP) did not claim to be a Christian democratic party, but it has been considered such by historian Michael Fogarty. The party's goals were anti-communism, the decentralization of industry, population, administration, and ownership. In its view that the ALP was filled with communists, the party decided it would prefer the ruling conservative Liberal and Country parties over the ALP. However, it was more morally conservative, militantly anti-communist, and socially compassionate than the Liberals. The DLP heavily lost ground in the federal election of 1974, which saw its primary vote cut by nearly two-thirds and the election of an ALP government.

The DLP never regained its previous support in subsequent elections and formally disbanded in 1978, but a small group within the party refused to accept this decision and created a small, reformed successor party (now the Democratic Labour Party). In 2006, the new DLP experienced a resurgence. The successor party struggled through decades of Victorian elections before finally gaining a parliamentary seat when the Victorian upper house was redesigned. Nevertheless, its electoral support is still minimal in Victoria (around 2%). It has recently reformed state parties in Queensland and New South Wales. In the 2010 Australian federal election, the DLP won the sixth senate seat in Victoria, giving it representation in the Australian Senate.

The former Christian Democratic Party, initially known as the "Call to Australia (Fred Nile) Group", was a strongly religious conservative party in Australia. It is a Christian right party, akin to the Canadian Christian Heritage Party and New Zealand Christian Heritage Party. In 2011, the Victorian and Western Australian branches of the Christian Democratic Party (CDP) voted to form a new party, Australian Christians, while the former Christian Democratic Party was wound up due to governance issues in 2022, and its leader, Fred Nile, moved onto a new party: "Christ in Government (Fred Nile Alliance)".

=== United States ===
Historically, there has been no major Christian democratic movement in the United States. This is potentially a result of the two-party system in the US. However, for European Christian democrats, the United States has been a source of inspiration for how Christianity and democracy can work together. Indeed, for Jacques Maritain, America was the realization of the Christian democratic ideal. Thus, Invernizzi Accetti opined that "from the point of view of Christian Democrats themselves, the United States didn't need a Christian Democratic party or movement because it already was a Christian Democracy." However, there have been some Christian democratic Groups in the US; inspired by the "People and Freedom Group" in the United Kingdom, US Catholics set up similar groups in American cities. The American Solidarity Party is a minor third party in the United States that identifies as a Christian democratic party. Based in the United States, the Center for Public Justice is a Christian democratic public policy organization that desires to "bring the principles of a Christian worldview to bear on the political realm."

=== Canada ===
The platform of the Christian Heritage Party of Canada, which was founded by Catholic politicians Bill and Heather Stilwell, as well as Reformed politicians Ed and Audrey Vanwoudenberg, resonates with Christian democratic political ideology.

Asia

South Korea

Although Christian democratic movements are not prevalent in the East Asia as Christianity is not a main religion there, liberal parties in South Korea, the only country in the East Asia where Christianity is the main religion, tend to have Christian democratic tendencies. Democratic Party of Korea, which is the main liberal party of South Korea, supports building universal welfare state. However they tend to be conservative on social issues due to the influence of Christianity. Democratic Party of Korea oppose anti-discrimination law, gay marriage, civil union and abortion.

Some researchers have placed the DPK's position on the political spectrum to the right of Christian democracy, saying that the DPK is "more [economically and socially] conservative than the centre-right German Christian Democratic Union of Germany (CDU)" in particular. The Democratic Party's LGBT+ policy is more conservative than CDU. Because of this, some left-leaning researchers have placed the party more right-wing than Western European conservative parties. Also, many members of the Democratic Party, such as Lee Hae-chan, Moon Jae-in, and Lee Jae-myung, define the party's de facto identity as 'true conservative', 'moderate conservative' or 'centre-right'. In his book titled 1219 The end is beginning, Moon Jae-in writes, "it is only a backward political reality unique to South Korea that political forces which are centre-right in nature are attacked for being attacked for being left-wing."

== See also ==
- List of Christian democratic parties around the world

=== International Christian democratic organizations ===
- Centrist Democrat International (CDI) – formerly Christian Democratic International
- Christian Democratic Organization of America (ODCA) – a CDI regional organization for the Americas
- European Christian Political Movement (ECPM) – a European party (non-CDI)
- European Democratic Party (EDP) – a European party (non-CDI)
- European People's Party (EPP) – the largest transnational European party of Christian democratic and conservative parties (a CDI and IDU regional)

=== Related concepts ===
- Catholic social teaching
- Centrism
- Christian corporatism
- Christian left
- Christian libertarianism
- Christian nationalism
- Christian reconstructionism
- Christian republic
- Christian right
- Christian socialism
- Christian state
- Christian values
- Christianity and politics
- Communitarianism
- Compassionate conservatism
- Corporatism
- Cultural conservatism
- Distributism
- Dominion Theology
- Georgism
- Islamic democracy
- Liberation theology
- Moderation theory
- Neo-Calvinism
- One-nation conservatism
- Ordoliberalism
- Paleolibertarianism
- Political Catholicism
- Radical centrism
- Social conservatism
- Social credit
- Social democracy
- Social market economy
- Theodemocracy
- Third Way
