= Solidarism =

Political ideology

Solidarism refers to any of several social movements which advocate for various kinds of solidarity.

Solidarism or solidarist can also refer to:

- The term "solidarism" is applied to the sociopolitical thought advanced by Léon Bourgeois based on ideas by the sociologist Émile Durkheim which is loosely applied to a leading social philosophy operative during and within the French Third Republic before the First World War.
- The Christian Solidarism of Heinrich Pesch (1854–1926), which became substantially influential on Catholic social teaching, from the Papal Encyclical Quadragesimo Anno and beyond.
- The Swedish system of labor arrangement in which labor unions and capitalists jointly set wages below market clearing levels. From this arrangement, labor receives full employment and wage leveling, while capitalists pay less for labor, and do not have to worry about their employees being "poached" by firms who can offer more. This arrangement is traditionally enforced through employer organizations.
- New name used by Otto Strasser to refer to his post-war interpretation of Strasserism and its economics in particular.
- A political and economic model developed by Rudolf Diesel and laid out in his 1903 book.
- Among the French far-right, solidarism refers to a tendency which was headed by Jean-Pierre Stirbois and Michel Collinot (French Solidarist Movement). Solidarists support a non-capitalist, non-communist "third position", and are generally opponents of the influence of both the Soviet Union and the United States. It was recently an influence upon the Radical Network. National Front member Roger Holeindre claimed to follow this tendency.
- An element within the White movement in Russia opposed to communism and seeking a Christian alternative to collectivism was called the National Alliance of Russian Solidarists.
- The name of the social philosophy to which Edward Bellamy, author of the American utopian novel Looking Backward, adhered, and which Bellamy sometimes referenced as the Religion of Solidarity.
- A member of the American Solidarity Party, a minor Christian Democratic party in the United States, is often referred to as a "Solidarist".
- In Belgium, the far-right Verdinaso, which desired the unification of the Low Countries into one state, referred to itself as "National-Solidarist".

== See also ==
- Anomie – Sociological term for "normlessness"
- Catholic social teaching – Social doctrine of the Catholic Church
- Cooperatism – History of the type of autonomous association
- Distributism – Economic theory promoting local control
- Social cohesion – Bonding between members of a group
- Social justice – Concept in political philosophy
- Solidarity economy – Model of organization emphasizing cooperation and social health over profit
- Third Way – Centrist political position
