= Christian corporatism =

Political application of the Christian doctrine of Paul of Tarsus

Christian corporatism is a societal, economic, or a modern political application of the Christian doctrine of Paul of Tarsus in I Corinthians 12:12–31 where Paul speaks of an organic form of politics and society where all people and components are functionally united, like the human body.

Christian corporatism has been supported by the Roman Catholics, Protestants and Christian democrats. The rise of the Christian democratic movement tempered the more authoritarian corporatism in the 1800s. Economic application of Christian corporatism has promoted consultations between employers and workers.

== Medieval Europe ==
During the Middle Ages, the Roman Catholic Church sponsored the creation of various institutions including brotherhoods, monasteries, religious orders, and military associations, especially during the Crusades, to sponsor connection between these groups.

== Roman Catholic ==
Catholic corporatism has its origins in the counter-revolutionary Catholic circles in continental Europe. These movements opposed the outcomes of the French Revolution; liberalism, democracy, secularism and anti-clericalism. They also opposed the Manchester school of economics, and so there was a desire for corporations that were like the old guild system.

In 1881, Pope Leo XIII commissioned theologians and social thinkers to study corporatism and provide a definition for it. In 1884 in Freiburg, Germany, the commission declared that corporatism was a "system of social organization that has at its base the grouping of men according to the community of their natural interests and social functions, and as true and proper organs of the state they direct and coordinate labor and capital in matters of common interest."

In 1885, in Fribourg, Switzerland, Bishop Mermillod held a meeting of leading Catholics studying the social Question, in hopes to internationalize this study. Referred to as the Union de Fribourg, this group developed a number of positions that reflect corporatism. When in 1888 the Pope gave them an audience, they affirmed the dignity of labor, and made notes on property ownership and market speculation. They also gave detail reports on a moral minimum wage, Credit and interest, and an early elaboration on the corporative organization of society. However at these stages, the corporatists were quite enamored with guilds and only endorsed mixed associations of employers and employees. Another meeting, the corporatist internationale was held in Berlin in 1890, which further encouraged the growth of the movement.

In 1891, Pope Leo XIII issued the papal encyclical Rerum novarum, which is considered foundational to catholic social thought. In the encyclical the pope rejected class war and called for cooperation and mutual agreement between Employers and Employees. Often the Encyclical is taken as the Church blessing trade unions. However some dispute this and argue that the papacy was really talking about workers relief organizations, instead of the modern trade union. The pope also condemned any workers associations with bad principles and people coerced workers into joining these workers associations. Instead he called for Catholic workers to form their own associations. Many corporatist unions in Europe were backed by the Roman Catholic Church to challenge the rise of anarchist, Marxist and other radical unions, with the corporatist unions being fairly conservative in comparison to their radical rivals. Furthermore, the pope calls for mixed worker-owner associations with a specific emphasis on Catholicism to help the working class.

=== Solidarism ===
One of the most influential Catholic corporatisms was Heinrich Pesch's Solidarism, whose thought greatly influenced Christian Democratic thought. Pesch was quite in tune with the prior Catholic corporatist thinkers, and his solidarism was a systematization of the work of Wilhelm Von Ketteler, Vogelsang & Franz Hitze. Pesch used the lense of solidarity to argue for the family as the a crucial pillar of society, internationalism based on shared humanity, patriotism based on shared state, and class and cross-class solidarity based on shared economic interests. This latter solidarity would justify collective bargaining and codetermination. In opposition to the liberal and socialist labor theories, Pesch argued for the "Socialization of Persons", into things such as labor unions and chambers of commerce. Pesch his solidarity view as such:

The kind of peaceful relationship between workers and employers that is required for the interests of both parties can only profit from a fuller corporative unity of occupational organizations, wider-ranging formation of the working community, and the more complete development of social organism, starting at the lowest level of the individual shop and extending upward to regional organizations and finally, all of the way to the level of a national economic council. This latter body then must lay the groundwork for legislation by the political parliament.

This differentiation of levels of economic organization was the result of subsidiarity.

Peschs idea's were quite influential on Quadragesimo anno (1931), which was published on the fortieth anniversary of the publishing of Rerum novarum. Pesch's pupil, Oswald von Nell-Breuning, who was the principal drafter. Pope Pius XI in advocated Christian corporatism as an alternative to capitalist individualism and socialist totalitarianism whereby people would be organized into workers' guilds or vocational groups that would cooperate under the supervision of a neutral state.

== Protestant ==
In response to the rise in popularity of Roman Catholic corporatism in the 1890s, Protestant corporatism arose, especially in Germany, the Netherlands, and Scandinavia. In the Netherlands, Protestant corporatism can be found in the works of Abraham Kuyper, whose ideas partially inspired the polder model.

However, corporatism in the Netherlands and Scandinavia was far less influential in the interwar period then that in Southern, Central and eastern Europe.

== Reference list ==
- Bowen, Ralph (1947). German theories of the corporative state : with special reference to the period 1870-1919. New York: McGraw.
- Boyle, Joseph (2019). "Rerum novarum (1891)". In Bradley, Gerard V.; Brugger, E. Christian (eds.). Catholic Social Teaching: A Volume of Scholarly Essays. Cambridge: Cambridge University Press. pp. 69–89.
- Ederer, Rupert J (1991). "Heinrich Pesch, solidarity, and social encyclicals". Review of Social Economy. 49 (4): 596–610. doi:10.1080/00346769100000050.(subscription required)
- Fogarty, Michael P. (1957). Christian democracy in Western Europe, 1820-1953. Notre Dame: University of Notre Dame Press.
- Gehler, Michael; Kaiser, Wolfram (2004). Christian Democracy in Europe since 1945. Routledge. ISBN 0-7146-5662-3.
- Krason, Stephen M. (2009). "PRINCIPLES OF HEINRICH PESCH'S SOLIDARISM". The Catholic Social Science Review. 14: 477–483. doi:10.5840/cssr20091435.
- Kroeker, Peter Travis (1995). Christian ethics and political economy in North America : a critical analysis. Montreal: McGill-Queen's University Press.
- Misner, Paul (1991). Social Catholicism in Europe : from the onset of industrialization to the First World War. New York: The Crossroad Publishing Company.
- Misner, Paul (2003). "Christian Democratic Social Policy". In Kselman, Thomas; Buttigieg, Joseph A. (eds.). European Christian democracy : historical legacies and comparative perspectives. Notre Dame: University of Notre Dame Press.
- Pesch, Heinrich (1998). Heinrich Pesch on solidarist economics : excerpts from the Lehrbuch der Nationalökonomie. Translated by Ederer, Rupert J. University Press of America.
- Pollard, John (2017). "Corporatism and political Catholicism: The impact of Catholic corporatism in inter-war Europe". In Costa Pinto, Antonio (ed.). Corporatism and Fascism. London: Routledge. ISBN 9781315388908.
- Wiarda, Howard J. (1997). Corporatism and Comparative Politics: The Other Great "Ism". M.E. Sharpe.
- Van Dyke, Harry (2021). "Industrial Organisation: Text Introduction". In Heslam, Peter S (ed.). On Business and Economics. Bellingham: Lexham Press. pp. 299–300. ISBN 9781577996767.
