= Heinrich Pesch House =

Catholic academy

Coordinates: 49°29′4.96″N 8°24′39.64″E

Heinrich Pesch House Catholic Academy Rhein-Neckar
- Abbreviation: HPH
- Location: Ludwigshafen, Germany
- Region served: Rhein-Neckar Triangle
- Director: Johann Spermann
- Affiliations: Jesuit, Catholic
- Website: PeschAcademy

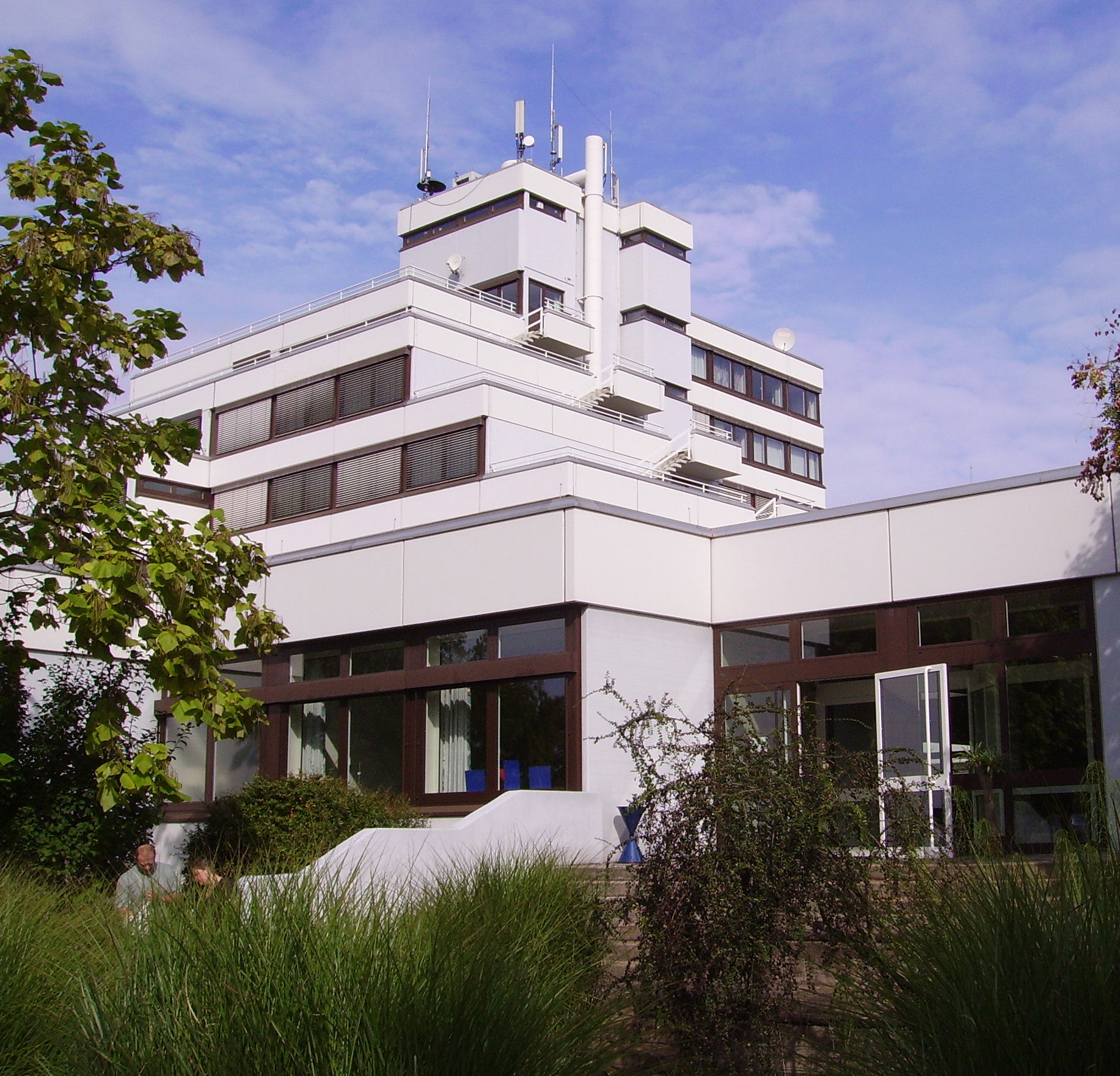

Heinrich Pesch House (HPH) is a Catholic academy in Rhine-Neckar, in Ludwigshafen, Germany. The Jesuit-run centre offers lectures, seminars, workshops and conferences.

The Heinrich Pesch Foundation was founded in 2013 to support the centre and specific programs. A non-profit organization, HPH is supported by the Diocese of Speyer, the Jesuit Order and the Catholic community of Ludwigshafen and Mannheim.

Heinrich Pesch was a 19th-century Jesuit whose economic theory had a major impact on Rerum Novarum, which was the first Catholic social encyclical.

== Programs ==
The institute has programs in the fields of "Religion and spirituality", "Ethics in business and society", "Employee representation", "Family education" and Healthcare. It also has a Centre for Ignatian Pedagogy
