= Graves de communi re =

1901 papal encyclical by Pope Leo XIII

Graves de communi re Encyclical of Pope Leo XIII
- Signature date: 18 January 1901
- Subject: On Christian Democracy
- Number: 76 of 85 of the pontificate
- Text: In English

Graves de communi re is an encyclical written by Pope Leo XIII in 1901, on Christian Democracy. It is part of a larger body of writings known as Catholic social teaching, that trace their origin to Rerum novarum which was issued by Pope Leo XIII in 1891. While reaffirming the Church's opposition to individualistic liberal capitalism, it also denied that the new ideals of Christian Democracy were an endorsement of the principles of a democratic political system. Leo also criticizes socialism within the work, referring to it as a "harvest of misery".

== See also ==
- List of encyclicals of Pope Leo XIII
