= Subsidiarity in Catholicism =

Organizing principle

Subsidiarity is an important principle in Catholicism. It is defined as an organizing principle that matters ought to be handled at multiple levels of organization and not just by a centralized authority. Political decisions should be taken at a local level if possible, rather than by a central authority. The word subsidiarity is derived from the Latin word subsidiarius and has its origins in Catholic social teaching.

== Catholic social teaching ==
The development of the concept of subsidiarity has roots in the natural law philosophy of Thomas Aquinas, and was mediated by the social scientific theories of Luigi Taparelli, S.J., in his 1840–1843 natural law treatise on the human person in society. In that work, Taparelli established the criteria of just social order, which he referred to as "hypotactical right" and which came to be termed subsidiarity following German influences.

The term subsidiarity as employed in Catholic social thought was inspired by the teaching of Wilhelm Emmanuel von Ketteler, who served as Bishop of Mainz in the mid- to late 19th century. It is most well-known, however, from its subsequent incorporation into Pope Pius XI's encyclical Quadragesimo anno. This encyclical's formulation of subsidiarity is the touchstone from which further interpretations tend to depart:

Just as it is gravely wrong to take from individuals what they can accomplish by their own initiative and industry and give it to the community, so also it is an injustice and at the same time a grave evil and disturbance of right order to assign to a greater and higher association what lesser and subordinate organizations can do. For every social activity ought of its very nature to furnish help to the members of the body social, and never destroy and absorb them.

As with many social encyclicals in the modern period, this one occurs in the historical context of the intensifying struggle between communist and capitalist ideologies, exactly forty years—hence the title—after the Vatican's first public stance on the issue in Rerum novarum. Promulgated in 1931, Quadragesimo anno is a response to German National Socialism (Nazism) and Soviet communism, on one hand, and to Western European and American capitalist individualism on the other.

Gregory Beabout suggests that subsidiarity draws upon a far older concept as well: the Roman military term subsidium. He writes that "the role of the 'subsidium' (literally, to sit behind) is to lend help and support in case of need." Employing Beabout's etymology, subsidiarity indicates that the higher social unit ought to "sit behind" the lower ones to lend help and support in case of need. Another etymological interpretation states that subsidiarity literally means "to 'seat' ('sid') a service down ('sub') as close to the need for that service as is feasible." Either interpretation indicates a hermeneutic of subsidiarity in which the higher social body's rights and responsibilities for action are predicated upon their assistance to and empowerment of the lower.

Francis McHugh states that in addition to the "vertical" dimension of subsidiarity, there is also a "horizontal" dimension which "calls for a diversity of semi-autonomous social, economic, and cultural spheres." Quadragesimo anno presents these "spheres" as occupying the space between the poles of individual and State: "...things have come to such a pass through the evil of what we have termed "individualism" that, following upon the overthrow and near extinction of that rich social life which was once highly developed through associations of various kinds, there remain virtually only individuals and the State. This is to the great harm of the State itself; for, with a structure of social governance lost, and with the taking over of all the burdens which the wrecked associations once bore. the State has been overwhelmed and crushed by almost infinite tasks and duties." These associations or "lesser societies" are encouraged because they are the vehicle by which society functions most effectively and corresponds most closely with human dignity. Examples of these associations today would include the family, unions, nonprofit organizations, religious congregations, and corporations of all sizes.

Subsidiarity charts a course between individualism and collectivism by locating the responsibilities and privileges of social life in the smallest unit of organization at which they will function. Larger social bodies, be they the state or otherwise, are permitted and required to intervene only when smaller ones cannot carry out the tasks themselves. Even in this case, the intervention must be temporary and for the purpose of empowering the smaller social body to be able to carry out such functions on its own.

Building on the personalist and social theories of Luigi Taparelli, the use of the term subsidiarity was advanced by German theologian and aristocrat Oswald von Nell-Breuning. His work influenced the social teaching of Pope Pius XI in Quadragesimo anno. That encyclical holds that government should undertake only those initiatives which exceed the capacity of individuals or private groups acting independently. Functions of government, business, and other secular activities should be as local as possible. If a complex function is carried out at a local level just as effectively as on the national level, the local level should be the one to carry out the specified function. The principle is based upon the autonomy and dignity of the human individual, and holds that all other forms of society, from the family to the state and the international order, should be in the service of the human person. Subsidiarity assumes that these human persons are by their nature social beings, and emphasizes the importance of small and intermediate-sized communities or institutions, like the family, the church, labor unions and other voluntary associations, as mediating structures which empower individual action and link the individual to society as a whole. "Positive subsidiarity", which is the ethical imperative for communal, institutional or governmental action to create the social conditions necessary to the full development of the individual, such as the right to work, decent housing, health care, etc., is another important aspect of the subsidiarity principle.

The principle of subsidiarity was first formally developed in the encyclical Rerum novarum of 1891 by Pope Leo XIII (although the encyclical does not use the word subsidiarity), as an attempt to articulate a middle course between laissez-faire capitalism on one hand and forms of state socialism on the other. The principle was further developed in Pope Pius XI's encyclical Quadragesimo anno of 1931.

It is a fundamental principle of social philosophy, fixed and unchangeable, that one should not withdraw from individuals and commit to the community what they can accomplish by their own enterprise and industry. (Pope Pius XI, Quadragesimo anno, 79)

In their 1986 pastoral letter Economic Justice for All, the U.S. Catholic bishops cited subsidiarity as an essential principle of a just society.

Distributism, a third way economic philosophy developed by Hilaire Belloc and G. K. Chesterton and originating in concepts associated with the Catholic social teaching, considers the principle of subsidiarity to be a cornerstone of its theoretical foundation. As Christian Democratic political parties were formed, they adopted the Catholic social teaching of subsidiarity, as well as the neo-Calvinist theological teaching of sphere sovereignty, with both Protestants and Roman Catholics sometimes agreeing "that the principles of sphere sovereignty and subsidiarity boiled down to the same thing.", although the sovereignty-principle is a more horizontal principle, like the separation of church and state, and more ordered towards freedom of groups from state intervention, whereas the subdiarity principle is vertically oriented, and structurally implying facilitating and supporting lower echelons in case of necessity.

The Church's belief in subsidiarity is found in the programs of the Catholic Campaign for Human Development, where grassroots community organizing projects are supported to promote economic justice and end the cycle of poverty. These projects directly involve the people they serve in their leadership and decision-making.

Phillip Berryman considers the principle of subsidiarity to be essentially anarchistic.

== See also ==
- Sphere sovereignty, a distinct Protestant concept, sometimes confused with subsidiarity
- Subsidiarity, political principle of decentralization
- Subsidiarity (European Union), principle in the European Union that Member States make decisions unless otherwise necessary
