= The Condition of Labor =

1891 open letter by Henry George

The Condition of Labor: An Open Letter to Pope Leo XIII
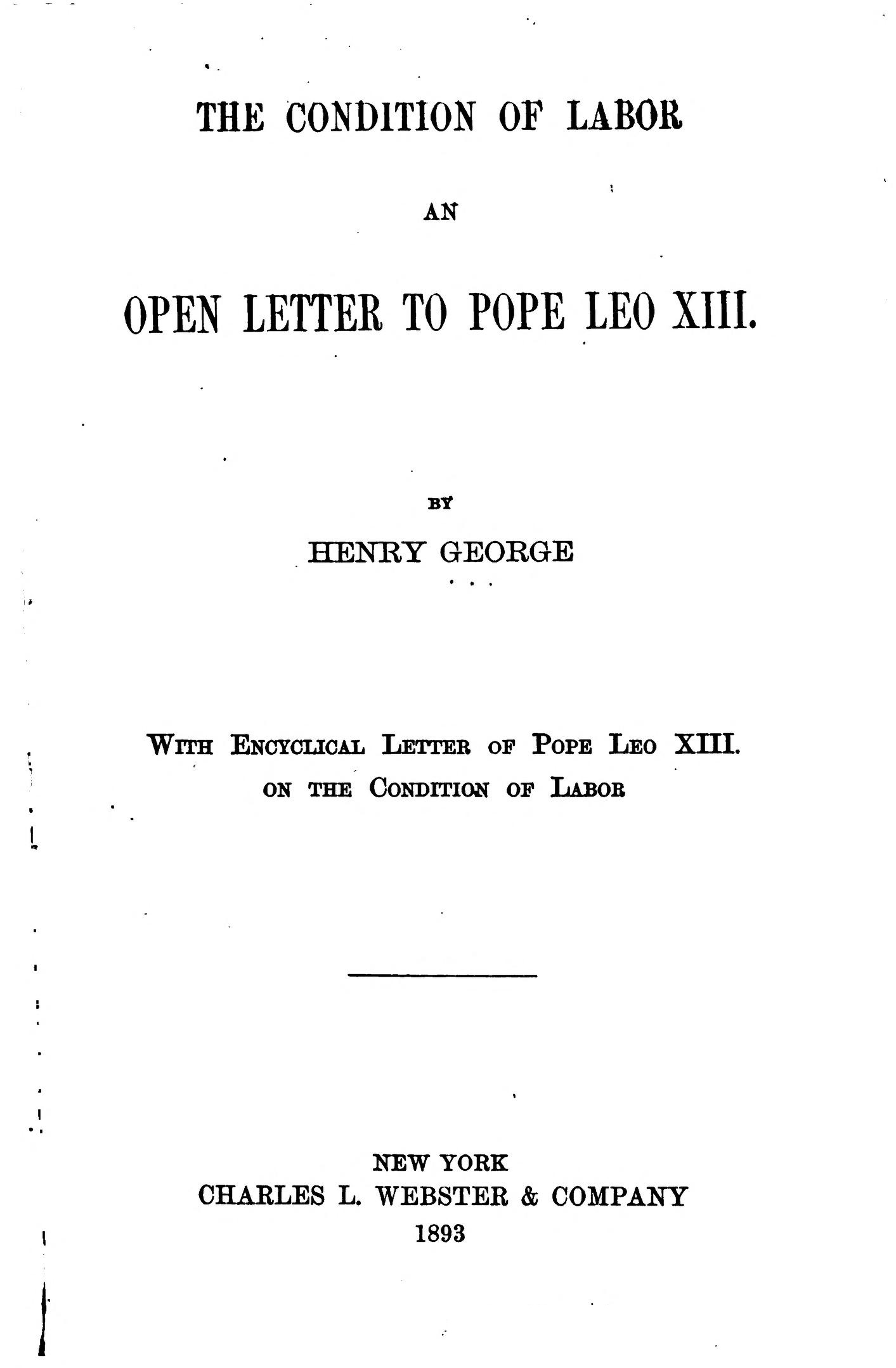
- Cover of the 1893 edition
- Author: Henry George
- Language: English
- Subject: Georgism, Catholic social teaching
- Publication date: 1891
- Publication place: United States
- Media type: Print (hardcover and paperback)
- Pages: 157

The Condition of Labor: An Open Letter to Pope Leo XIII is an open letter written and published in 1891 by the American economist, philosopher, and journalist Henry George. It was published in direct response to the Catholic Church's encyclical Rerum novarum (Rights and Duties of Capital and Labor) published previously that same year, which George feared would persuade Catholics away from his growing single-tax movement.

== Background ==
On May 15, 1891, Pope Leo XIII issued an encyclical titled Rerum novarum (Rights and Duties of Capital and Labor). In his letter, the Pope affirms the right to private property in land, stating:

Thus, if he lives sparingly, saves money, and, for greater security, invests his savings in land, the land, in such case, is only his wages under another form; and, consequently, a working man's little estate thus purchased should be as completely at his full disposal as are the wages he receives for his labor. But it is precisely in such power of disposal that ownership obtains, whether the property consist of land or chattels.

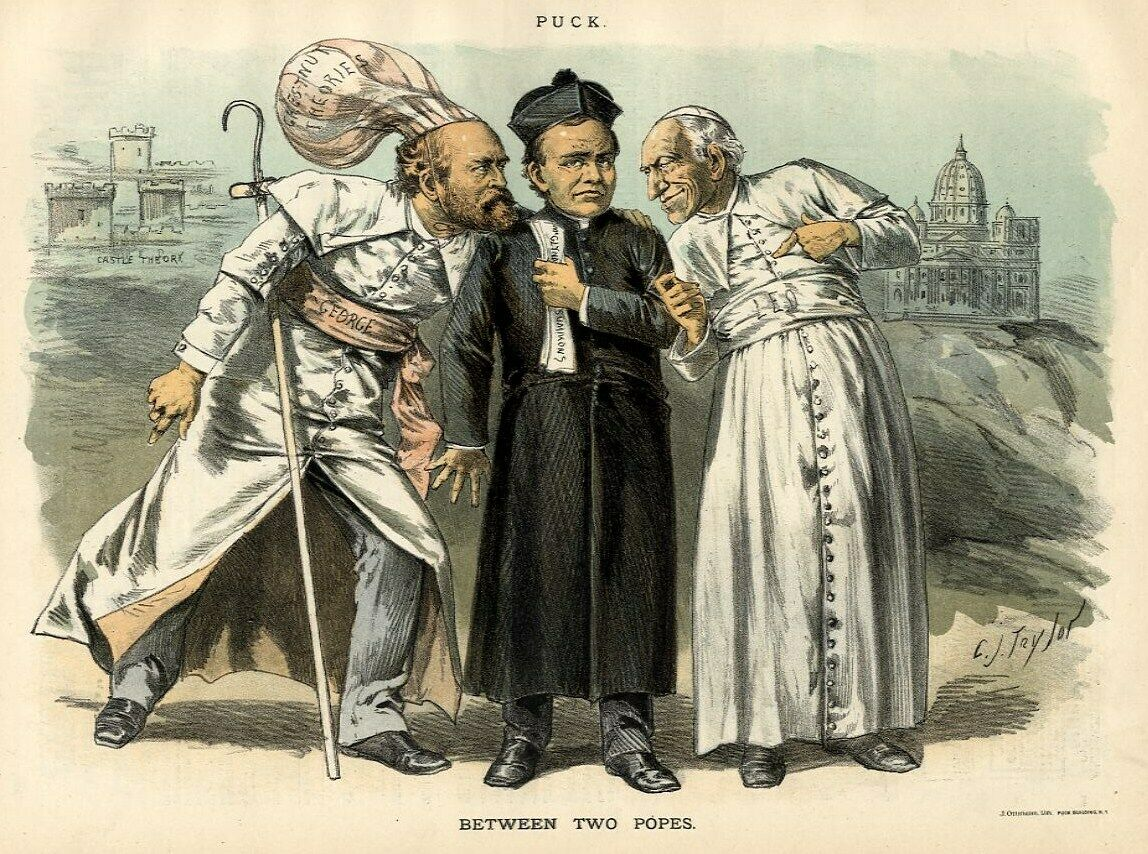
"Between Two Popes" – Puck 1887. Edward McGlynn Between "King" Henry George and Pope Leo XIII

Five years earlier in 1887, Irish-American New York City Catholic priest and social reformer Edward McGlynn had been excommunicated by Archbishop Michael Corrigan from the Church due to his support and personal contributions to the mayoral campaign of George, who was the founder and leader of the single-tax movement, during the latter's 1886 New York City mayoral election, and in 1889 the Holy Office had notified to Cardinal James Gibbons of the Archdiocese of Baltimore that Georgism was incompatible with Catholic social teaching.

== Text synopsis ==
By the end of Summer in 1891, George had published an open letter in response to the papal encyclical, titled The Condition of Labor: an Open Letter to Pope Leo XIII. In the letter, George argues that abolishing private property is justified through divine law. In his published text, George also makes a distinction between ownership, and possession, of land, stating: "To combine the advantages of private possession with the justice of common ownership it is only necessary therefore to take for common uses what value attaches to land irrespective of any labor on it."

George's defense of his movement's aim to levy a single tax on land values argues that it is morally indefensible to claim otherwise, as it is therefore denying equality of opportunity, what he believes is the most inalienable natural right, arguing that the single-tax is in conformity with God's laws. In one passage, George writes:

We see that Christ was not a mere dreamer when he told men that if the world would seek the kingdom of God and its right-doing they might no more worry about material things than do the lilies of the field about their raiment; but that he was only declaring what political economy in the light of modern discovery shows to be a sober truth.

George believed that none of Pope Leo XIII's recommendations for the uplifting of labor could be effective. The Pope believed the following:

1. The state should interfere with the overwork of workingmen, restrict the employment of women in the workforce as well as child labor, support workplace health promotion and secure safer working conditions according to public health and morals in order to prevent strikes, and engage in wage regulation. George argued that limiting the hours of labor and the employment of specific persons would not result in poverty reduction "as long as people are living in a penurious condition", and disagreed that increasing the general wage-level through government fiat would solve the problems associated with low wages. (Note: Benestad (2012): According to George, the level of wages depends "on the ease or difficulty with which labor can obtain access to land"... The only way the State could override the effect of market tendencies on wages is to provide employment to all who wish it, or to sanction strikes and to support them with government funds.)
2. That the state should facilitate the acquisition of real property by workingmen through eminent domain. George believed that vulgar land redistribution has only a temporary effect on wealth inequality and only for the welfare of new landowners. (Note: Benestad (2012): With the advent of material progress, "land becomes more valuable," and, when this increasing value is left to private owners, "land must pass from the ownership of the poor into the ownership of the rich.")
3. That workingmens' associations (guilds and labor unions) should be formed. Following game theory, George held that guilds and unions are necessarily selfish for interests of their members, stating: "By the law of their being they must fight for their own hand, regardless of who is hurt, they ignore and must ignore the teaching of Christ that we should do to others as we would have them to do to us, which a true political economy shows is the only way to the full emancipation of the masses."

== Reception ==
=== Contemporary assessments ===
The New York Times acclaimed the prose of the open letter in the year it was published, writing: "We should say that it would be difficult for any one to read this book without cordial recognition of the writer's candor, of the sincerity and depth of his conviction, and of the courtesy and tact with which he maintains his part in a controversy against so eminent an authority. The tone of this book throughout is admirable, and we can commend it ..." At the same time, The New York Times criticized George for his proposal to do away with private property and his justification through divine law, writing:

The remainder of mankind, given over to the notion that all human reason is fallible, would still have a penchant for their own conclusions, if they differed, as for the most part they do, from Mr. George's. So that for practical purposes we shall have to dismiss, or at least disregard, Mr. George's plea for his scheme as a product of heavenly wisdom ... [The single tax on land values] might be when once set up, it would involve, to begin with, a stupendous confiscation of what is now, under the law of our own and of every other civilized nation, private property in land, and that confiscation cannot be effected under American law without fair compensation to present owners, unless, indeed, the Constitution could be changed to permit it ...

In 1892, a year after the open letter became published, Pope Leo XIII sent Archbishop Francesco Satolli to the United States as papal legate with instructions to review the McGlynn case. An examination was held at the Catholic University of America. With the assurance of four professors at the university that McGlynn's single-tax views were not contrary to Catholic teaching, led Satolli to lift the excommunication on December 23 and reinstate him in the ministry the next day. The following Summer, McGlynn visited Rome and was cordially received in private audience by the Pope. In his description of this event shortly afterwards, McGlynn reported that the Pope had said to him, "But surely you admit the right of property", and that he had answered in the affirmative as regards "the products of individual industry". Apparently, the Pope was satisfied with this answer.

=== Modern assessments ===
It is not clear whether Pope Leo XIII's 1891 encyclical was a specific response to the growth of the single-tax movement or simply to left-wing politics in general. Georgist economist Mason Gaffney (1923–2020) maintained that Rerum novarum was a reaction to George, citing McGlynn's excommunication from the Catholic Church, while Catholic Georgists such as John Young maintain there was and is no inherent conflict between Georgism and Catholic social teaching. Scholars such as John Pullen of the University of Notre Dame Australia argue that there is only a contradiction between the views of the Catholic Church and those of George at first glance and that they disagreed fundamentally only on their respective principles and polices.

== See also ==
- Distributism
- Land value tax
