= Sphere sovereignty =

Concept in neo-Calvinism

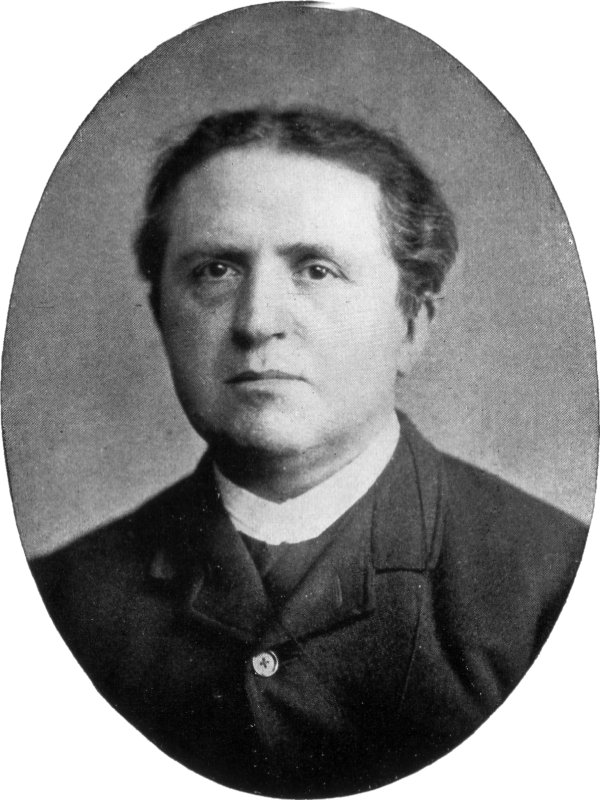
Sphere sovereignty was first formulated at the turn of the 20th century by the neo-Calvinist theologian and Dutch prime minister Abraham Kuyper.

In neo-Calvinism, sphere sovereignty (Dutch: soevereiniteit in eigen kring), also known as differentiated responsibility, is the concept that each sphere (or sector) of life has its own distinct responsibilities and authority or competence, and stands equal to other spheres of life. Sphere sovereignty involves the idea of an all-encompassing created order, designed and governed by God. This created order includes societal communities (such as those for purposes of education, worship, civil justice, agriculture, economy and labor, marriage and family, artistic expression, etc.), their historical development, and their abiding norms. The principle of sphere sovereignty seeks to affirm and respect creational boundaries, and historical differentiation.

Sphere sovereignty implies that no one area of life or societal community is sovereign over another. Each sphere has its own created integrity. Neo-Calvinists hold that since God created everything "after its own kind", diversity must be acknowledged and appreciated. For instance, the different God-given norms for family life and economic life should be recognized, such that a family does not properly function like a business. Similarly, neither faith-institutions (e.g. churches) nor an institution of civil justice (i.e. the state) should seek totalitarian control, or any regulation of human activity outside their limited competence, respectively.

The concept of sphere sovereignty became a general principle in European countries governed by Christian democratic political parties, who held it as an integral part of their ideology. The promotion of sphere sovereignty by Christian democrats led to the creation of corporatist welfare states throughout the world.

== Historical background ==
Sphere sovereignty is an alternative to the worldviews of ecclesiasticism and secularism (especially in its statist form). During the Middle Ages, a form of papal monarchy assumed that God rules over the world through the church.

Ecclesiasticism was widely evident in the arts. Religious themes were encouraged by art's primary patron, the church. Similarly, the politics in the Middle Ages often consisted of political leaders doing as the church instructed. In both economic guilds and agriculture the church supervised. In the family sphere, the church regulated sexual activity and procreation. In the educational sphere, several universities were founded by religious orders.

During the Renaissance, the rise of a secularist worldview accompanied the emergence of a wealthy merchant class. Some merchants became patrons of the arts, independent of the church. Protestantism later made civil government, the arts, family, education, and economics officially free from ecclesiastical control. While Protestantism maintained a full-orbed or holistically religious view of life as distinguished from an ecclesiasticism, the later secular Enlightenment sought to rid society of religion entirely.

Sphere sovereignty was first formulated at the turn of the 20th century by the neo-Calvinist theologian and Dutch prime minister Abraham Kuyper and further developed by philosopher Herman Dooyeweerd. Kuyper based the idea of sphere sovereignty partially on the Christian view of existence coram Deo, every part of human life exists equally and directly "before the face of God". For Kuyper, this meant that sphere sovereignty involved a certain form of separation of church and state and a separation of state and other societal spheres, or anti-statism.

As Christian democratic political parties were formed, they adopted the principle of sphere sovereignty, with both Protestants and Roman Catholics agreeing "that the principles of sphere sovereignty and subsidiarity boiled down to the same thing", although this was at odds with Dooyeweerd's development of sphere sovereignty, which he held to be significantly distinct from subsidiarity.

== Applications ==
The doctrine of sphere sovereignty has many applications. The institution of the family, for example, does not come from the state, the church, or from contingent social factors, but derives from the original creative act of God (it is a creational institution). It is the task of neither the state nor the church to define the family or to promulgate laws upon it. This duty is reserved to the Word of God, held by Protestantism to be sovereign, i.e., beyond the control of either church or state. The family (defined as the covenantal commitment of one man and one woman to each other and to their offspring) is not instituted by the state nor by any other external power, but proceeds naturally from the heads of households, who are directly responsible to God. However, when a particular family fails in its own responsibilities, institutions of civil governance are authorized to seek rectification of relevant civil injustices.

Neither the state nor the church can dictate predetermined conclusions to a scientific organization, school or university. Applicable laws are those relative to that sphere only, so that the administration of schools should rest with those who are legitimately in charge of them, according to their specific competences and skills. Similarly, in a trade organization, the rules of trade only should be applied, and their leaders should be drawn from their own ranks of expertise. Similarly agriculture does not derive its laws from the government but from the laws of nature. Whenever a government presumes to regulate outside its sovereignty, those serving within the affected sphere should protest that the State is interfering in their internal affairs. The question is the proper role of civil governance and its intrinsic principle limits in terms of which it can act without interfering in the sovereignty of other spheres.

== Criticisms ==
For Kuyper, because the Netherlands included multiple religious-ideological (or, worldview) communities, these each should form their own "pillar", with their own societal institutions like schools, news media, hospitals, etc. That resulted in a pillarized society. (Note: Kuyper himself founded the Vrije Universiteit, where ministers for the Reformed Churches in the Netherlands would be educated without interference by the Dutch state because educating ministers lies beyond the sphere of civil government in Kuyper's view. Kuyper also helped establish the Anti-Revolutionary Party (a Reformed political party), several Reformed newspapers, and the Reformed Churches in the Netherlands (an independent Reformed church).)

Addressing the emergence of pillarization in the context of Kuyper's view of sphere sovereignty, Peter S. Heslam states, "Indeed, it could be argued that if Dutch society had been of a more 'homogenous' nature—rather than manifesting a roughly tripartite ideological divide between Catholics, Protestants, and Humanists—sphere sovereignty would still have been practicable whereas verzuiling [i.e., pillarization] would not have been necessary".

Some see the development of pillarization in the Netherlands as a failure of Kuyper to properly limit the state to its own sphere among other societal spheres, and to distinguish societal spheres from other worldview communities.

== See also ==
- Corporatism
- Separation of church and state
- Subsidiarity (Catholicism), a distinct concept, sometimes confused with sphere sovereignty
