= Heinrich Pesch =

German Jesuit, economist, and philosopher (1854–1926)

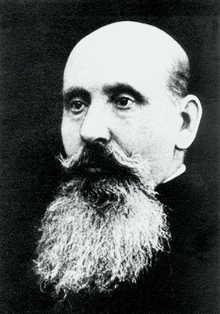
- Portrait of Pesch
- Born: 17 September 1854; Cologne, Kingdom of Prussia, German Confederation
- Died: 1 April 1926 (aged 71); Valkenburg, Netherlands
- Occupations: Educator; economist; Jesuit priest; philosopher

Academic background
- Influences: Rerum novarum

Academic work
- School or tradition: Solidarist school

Heinrich Pesch, S.J. (17 September 1854 – 1 April 1926) was a German Jesuit philosopher and economist of the Solidarist school. His major work, Lehrbuch der Nationalökonomie, is generally regarded as a source for Pope Pius XI's social encyclical Quadragesimo anno.

== Biography ==
Pesch was born in Cologne on 17 September 1854. After studying law at Bonn, Pesch entered the Society of Jesus in 1876. He made his novitiate with exiled German Jesuits in the Netherlands. For his studies of philosophy (1878–1881) Pesch was sent to Bleijenbeek, also in the Netherlands. He completed his theological studies at Ditton Hall (1884–1888). While in England, Pesch lectured for a few years at the Stella Matutina school. He was ordained a priest in 1888.

From 1892 until 1900, Pesch was spiritual director at the Mainz seminary, where he wrote his first book Liberalism, Socialism and Christian Order. Through lectures of the publicist Rudolf Meyer Pesch became acquainted with the teachings of Karl Marx and Johann Karl Rodbertus. After a renewed study of economics with Gustav von Schmoller and Adolph Wagner in Berlin (1900–1902), Pesch moved to Luxembourg and worked on his major opus Lehrbuch der Nationalökonomie. He died at the age of 71 in Valkenburg on 1 April 1926.

== Works ==
- Liberalismus, Socialismus und Christliche Gesellschaftsordnung, Vol. 2, Herder, 1900.
- Lehrbuch der Nationalökonomie, Freiburg im Breisgau, Herder, 1905–23 (5 Vol.)
- Die Soziale Befähigung der Kirche, Verlag der Germania, 1911.
- Ethik und Volkswirtschaft, Herdersche Verlagshandlung, 1918.

=== Works in English translation ===
- "Christian Solidarism." In: Joseph N. Moody (Ed.), Church and Society. New York: Arts, Inc., 1953.
- Heinrich Pesch on Solidarist Economics: Excerpts from the Lehrbuch Der Nationalökonomie. Translated by Rupert J. Ederer. University Press of America, 1998.
- Liberalism, Socialism and Christian Social Order, Translated by Rupert J. Ederer. Edwin Mellen Press, 2000 (5 vol.)
  - Book 1: The Philosophical Roots Of Economic Liberalism
  - Book 2: The Free Market Economy Or Economic Order?
  - Book 3: Private Property As A Social Institution
  - Book 4: The Christian Concept Of The State
  - Book 5: Modern Socialism
- Teaching Guide to Economics, Translated and Edited by Rupert J. Ederer. Edwin Mellen Press, 2002–2003 (10 Vol.)
  - Book One: Foundations for Economic Life (2 vols.)
  - Book Two: Economic Systems and the Nature and Dispositional Causes of the Wealth of a Nation (2 vols.)
  - Book Three: The Active Causes in the Ongoing Economic Process (2 vols.)
  - Book Four: The Satisfaction of a Nation’s Wants as the Purpose of the National Economy and Production (2 vols.)
  - Book Five: General Economics (2 vols.)
- Ethics and the National Economy, Translated with an introduction by Rupert Ederer, IHS Press, 2003.

== See also ==
- Social justice
- Heinrich Pesch House
