= Oswald von Nell-Breuning =

German Jesuit theologian and sociologist (1890–1991)

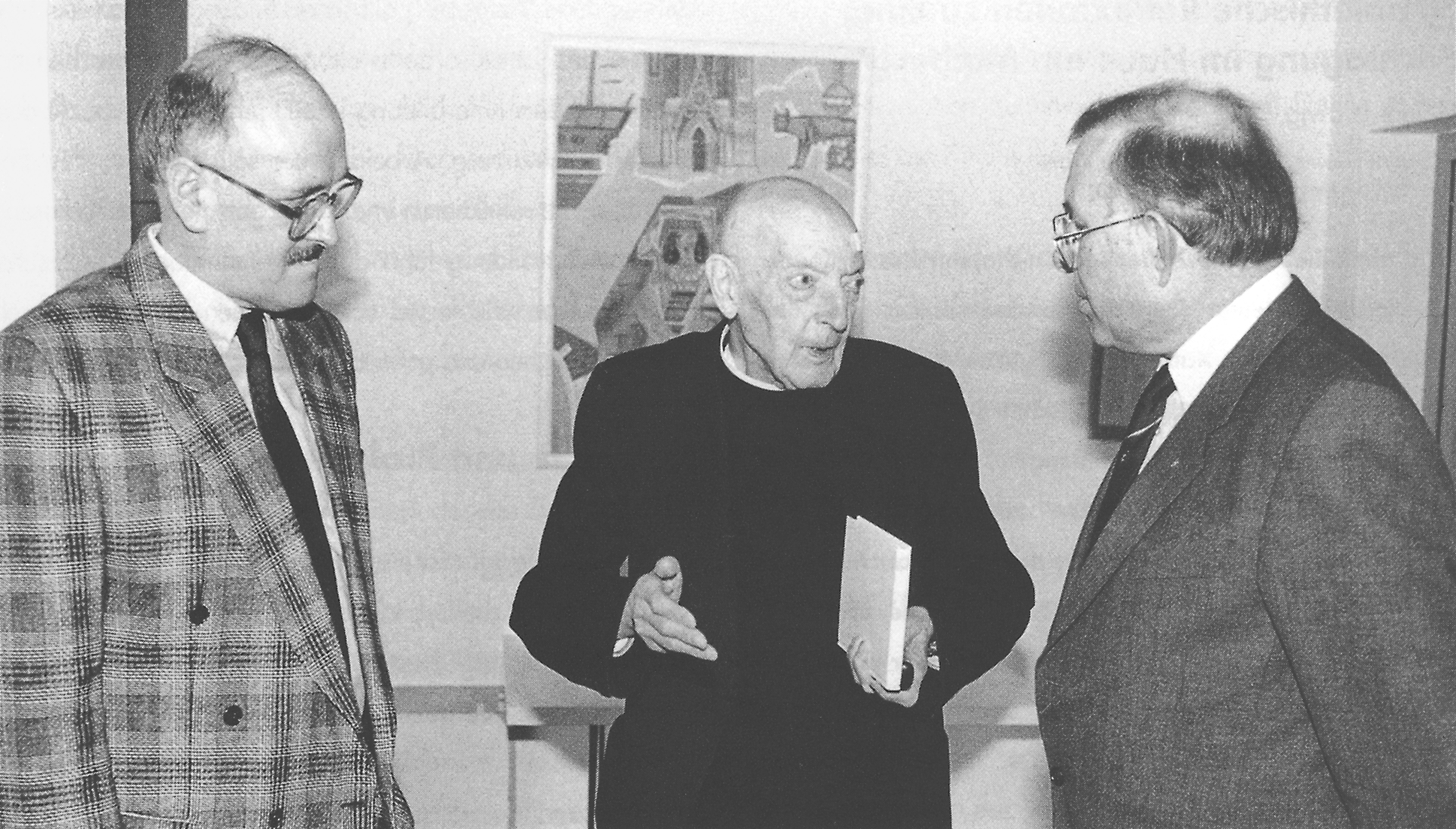
Father Oswald von Nell-Breuning with Prof. Heiner Ludwig (left) and Karl Nothof, Chairman of the KAB

Oswald von Nell-Breuning SJ (8 March 1890 – 21 August 1991) was a German Jesuit theologian and sociologist.

Born in Trier, on Germany's western border, into an aristocratic family in the last part of the 1800s, Nell-Breuning was ordained a Catholic priest in 1921. He had joined the Jesuits, an order of priests within the Catholic Church with a reputation for intellectual rigor and commitment to social justice. He was appointed Professor of Ethics at the Sankt Georgen Graduate School of Philosophy and Theology in Frankfurt in 1928.

Nell-Breuning was instrumental in the drafting of Pope Pius XI's important encyclical on social justice, Quadragesimo anno (1931). This interwar, Great Depression-era encyclical—like the earlier Rerum novarum (1891), after which it was named—dealt with the "Social Question" and developed the principle of subsidiarity.

Nell-Breuning was not allowed to publish from 1936 until the end of Nazi Germany in 1945. After the war he lectured as an honorary professor at Goethe University and later established his own "Akademie der Arbeit" (Academy of Work). He exerted a strong influence on the social policy program of the Christian Democratic Union of Germany, and had a close relationship with the German trade unions. He died in Frankfurt am Main in 1991.
