= Quadragesimo anno =

1931 encyclical by Pope Pius XI

Quadragesimo anno Latin for 'In the 40th Year' Encyclical of Pope Pius XI
- Signature date: 15 May 1931
- Subject: On the reconstruction of the social order
- Number: 19 of 31 of the pontificate
- Text: In Latin; In English

Quadragesimo anno (Latin pronunciation: [kʷa.draˈd͡ʒɛː.si.mo ˈan.no]) (Latin for "In the 40th Year") is an encyclical issued by Pope Pius XI on 15 May 1931, 40 years after Leo XIII's encyclical Rerum novarum, further developing Catholic social teaching. Unlike Rerum novarum, which primarily addressed the condition of workers, Pius XI discussed the ethical implications of the social and economic order. Quadragesimo anno describes the major dangers for human freedom and dignity arising from unrestrained capitalism, socialism, and communism as practised in Russia. In it, Pius XI also called for reconstruction of the social order based on the principles of solidarity and subsidiarity.

Essential contributors to the formulation of the encyclical were the German Jesuit Roman Catholic theologians and social philosophers Gustav Gundlach and the Königswinter Circle through one of its main authors Oswald von Nell-Breuning. Another influence was Heinrich Pesch.

== Changes since Rerum novarum ==
Pope Pius XI issued his encyclical exactly forty years after Rerum novarum. In the interim there were other papal statements from Leo XIII, and also the encyclical Singulari quadam of Pius X. Pius XI subtitled his encyclical Reconstruction of the Social Order. In the first part he reviews and applauds the encyclical of his predecessor. The Catholic Church can be credited with participating in the progress made and contributing to it. It developed a new social conscience.

== Private property ==
The Church has a vital role in discussing social and economic issues, not in their technical, but their moral and ethical aspects. This includes the nature of private property, concerning which several conflicting views had developed within the Catholic Church. Pius XI proclaims private property to be essential for the development and freedom of the individual, which are Christian values not to be denied. But, says Pius, private property has a social function as well, and it loses its moral value if it is not subordinated to the common good. Therefore, governments have a right to pursue redistribution policies, and in extreme cases to expropriate private property.

== Capital and labour ==
A related issue, says Pius, is the relation between capital and labour and the determination of fair wages. The Church considers it perverse in industrial society to have fiercely opposed social classes based on income. He welcomes all attempts to alleviate this strife and ameliorate its causes. Three elements determine a fair wage: The needs of the worker and his family, the economic condition of the enterprise, and the economy as a whole. The family has an innate right to development, but this is only possible within the framework of a functioning economy and sound enterprises. For this, Pius XI concludes that what is needed is not class conflict between worker and employer but solidarity, given the mutual interdependence of the parties involved.

== Social order ==
Industrialization, says Pius XI, resulted in less freedom at the individual and communal level, because numerous free social entities were absorbed by larger ones. A society of individuals became a mass and class society. Today people are much less interdependent than in ancient times, and become egoistic or class-conscious in order to recover some freedom for themselves. The pope demands more solidarity, especially between employers and employees through new forms of cooperation and communication. Pius draws a negative view of capitalism, especially of the anonymous international finance markets. He deplores that small and medium-size enterprises with insufficient access to capital markets are often squeezed or destroyed by big business. He warns that capital interests can endanger states, potentially reducing them to "chained slaves of individual interests". The encyclical has been an important inspiration to modern distributist thought on seeking greater solidarity and subsidiarity than present capitalism.

Pius mostly reaffirms the importance of traditional gender roles, emphasizing the importance of a family wage for fathers:

That the rest of the family should also contribute to the common support, according to the capacity of each, is certainly right, as can be observed especially in the families of farmers, but also in the families of many craftsmen and small shopkeepers. But to abuse the years of childhood and the limited strength of women is grossly wrong. Mothers, concentrating on household duties, should work primarily in the home or in its immediate vicinity. It is an intolerable abuse, and to be abolished at all cost, for mothers on account of the father's low wage to be forced to engage in gainful occupations outside the home to the neglect of their proper cares and duties, especially the training of children. Every effort must therefore be made that fathers of families receive a wage large enough to meet ordinary family needs adequately. But if this cannot always be done under existing circumstances, social justice demands that changes be introduced as soon as possible whereby such a wage will be assured to every adult workingman.

— Pius XI

== Communism and socialism ==
Regarding communism and socialism, Pius XI notes increasing differences. He condemns communism but also the social conditions which nourish it. He wants moderate socialism to distance itself from totalitarian communism as a practical matter and also on principle, in light of the dignity of the human person. Dignity and human freedom are ethical considerations which cannot be ensured by hostile class confrontation. Ethics are based on religion and this is the realm where the Church meets industrial society.

117 "Whether considered as a doctrine, or an historical fact, or a movement, Socialism, if it remains truly Socialism, even after it has yielded to truth and justice on the points which we have mentioned, cannot be reconciled with the teachings of the Catholic Church because its concept of society itself is utterly foreign to Christian truth."

118 "For, according to Christian teaching, man, endowed with a social nature, is placed on this earth so that by leading a life in society and under an authority ordained of God he may fully cultivate and develop all his faculties unto the praise and glory of his Creator; and that by faithfully fulfilling the duties of his craft or other calling he may obtain for himself temporal and at the same time eternal happiness. Socialism, on the other hand, wholly ignoring and indifferent to this sublime end of both man and society, affirms that human association has been instituted for the sake of material advantage alone."

== Reception ==
Ramsay MacDonald, the head of the British affiliate of the Socialist International, inquired of Cardinal Bourne, Archbishop of Westminster, on how the encyclical's statements on socialism applied to Catholics voting for or participating in socialist political parties. The Cardinal stated that there "is nothing in the encyclical which should deter Catholics from becoming members of the British Labour Party."

Franklin D. Roosevelt had high praise for the encyclical and quoted it extensively, especially on the evils of concentrated economic power.

The encyclical was well received by both Portugal under the Estado Novo regime, and Austria under the regime of the Fatherland Front, which both attempted to implement elements of the encyclical in their own countries.

== Notes ==
- Pius XI (1931). "Quadragesimo anno". Archived from the original on September 2, 2006.
