= Rerum novarum =

1891 encyclical issued by Pope Leo XIII

Rerum novarum Latin for 'of new things' Encyclical of Pope Leo XIII
- Signature date: 15 May 1891
- Subject: On capital and labor
- Number: 38 of 88 of the pontificate
- Text: In Latin; In English

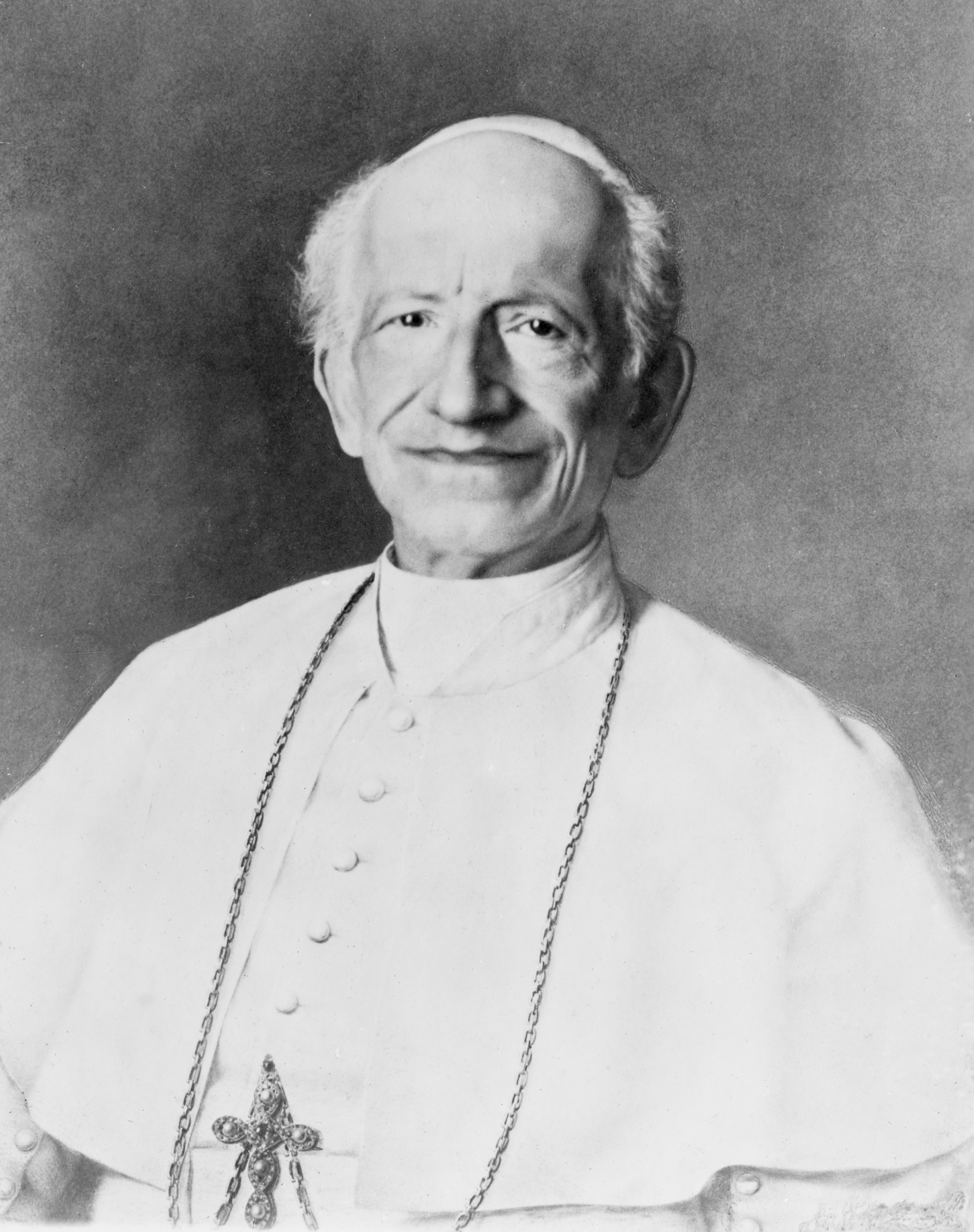
Pope Leo XIII, c. 1898

Rerum novarum (Latin "of new things") is an encyclical issued by Pope Leo XIII on 15 May 1891. It is an instructional letter passed to all Catholic bishops addressing the condition of the working class in the developing industrial economy. It discusses the relationships and mutual duties between labor and capital, as well as between government and its citizens. Of primary concern is the need to alleviate the poverty of the working class. The encyclical attempts to strike a just balance among the rights of workers, owners, and the state, supporting the rights of labor to form trade unions and earn a living wage, balanced with the right to private property, while rejecting the extremes of state socialism and laissez-faire capitalism.

As a foundational text of modern Catholic social teaching, Rerum novarum has been elaborated and supplemented by later encyclicals, including Pius XI's Quadragesimo anno (1931), John XXIII's Mater et magistra (1961), Paul VI's Octogesima adveniens (1971), John Paul II's Centesimus annus (1991), and Leo XIV's Magnifica humanitas (2026), each of which commemorate an anniversary of Rerum novarum.

The encyclical also inspired Catholic activism and influenced the development of both distributism and corporatism, as well as liberation theology. Socialists generally contest the encyclical's interpretation of socialism; Catholic socialists in particular, interpreting Rerum novarum as not rejecting socialism per se, argue that divine law justifies the abolition of private property and emphasize the encyclical's anti-capitalist character.

== Composition ==
The first draft and content of the encyclical was written by Tommaso Maria Zigliara, professor from 1870 to 1879 at the College of Saint Thomas (rector after 1873), a member of seven Roman congregations including the Congregation for Studies, and co-founder of the Pontifical Academy of Saint Thomas Aquinas in 1879. Zigliara's fame as a scholar at the forefront of the Thomist revival was widespread in Rome and elsewhere. In addition to Rerum novarum, which elicited the strongest response in the United States, Zigliara had contributed to the drafting of the encyclical Aeterni Patris (1879), which addressed modern science and attempted to advance the revival of Scholastic philosophy. He was a strong opponent of traditionalism and ontologism, favoring instead the moderate philosophical realism of Thomas Aquinas, and was with Giuseppe Pecci one of the Thomist cardinals of Leo XIII.

The encyclical was made possible by the writings of the precursors of economic personalism, in particular the Jesuit fathers Luigi Taparelli D'Azeglio and Matteo Liberatore. The latter was one of the authors of the document together with the Dominican Cardinal Tommaso Maria Zigliara. In drafting the encyclical, the Pope requested the collaboration of the then secretary for Latin letters Vincenzo Tarozzi. The German theologian Wilhelm Emmanuel von Ketteler and the British Cardinal Henry Edward Manning were also influential in its composition. Manning, who was a significant contributor to its development of the encyclical, encouraged English Catholics to engage in politics and seek economic justice, even going so far as to support the 1889 London dock strike.

== Message ==
Rerum novarum explicitly addresses the condition of the working class and is subtitled "On the Conditions of Labor", proclaiming the widely felt need that a "remedy must be found quickly for the misery and wretchedness pressing so unjustly on the majority of the working class". In this encyclical, Pope Leo articulates the Catholic Church's response to the social conflict in the wake of capitalism and industrialization, as well as to the secular social theories which had arisen in response, including socialist and communist movements such as Marxism, opposed by economic liberalism.

The encyclical balances the right of workers to form unions with the institution of property, asserting the right to a living wage. It condemns both extremes of state socialism and laissez-faire capitalism, while avoiding other radical alternatives like Georgism.

The Pope declares that the role of the state is to promote justice through the protection of rights, while the Church must teach vocally on social issues to calm class conflict. He restates the Church's long-standing teaching on the crucial importance of private property rights, but recognizes, in one of the best-known passages, that the free operation of market forces must be tempered by natural and religious morality. In that passage, he writes:

Let the working man and the employer make free agreements, and in particular let them agree freely as to the wages; nevertheless, there underlies a dictate of natural justice more imperious and ancient than any bargain between man and man, namely, that wages ought not to be insufficient to support a frugal and well-behaved wage-earner. If through necessity or fear of a worse evil the workman accept harder conditions because an employer or contractor will afford him no better, he is made the victim of force and injustice.

Rerum novarum vividly depicts the plight of the 19th-century urban poor and forthrightly condemns laissez-faire capitalism. It supports the formation of trade unions and the introduction of collective bargaining, particularly as an alternative to state intervention. Although the encyclical follows traditional teaching concerning the rights and duties of property and the relations of employer and employee, it applies the old doctrines to greatly changed modern conditions, hence the title. (Note: The opening words in Latin are "Rerum novarum semel excitata cupidine", which in the official English translation is rendered "The spirit of revolutionary change". Rerum novarum is the genitive case of res novae, which literally means "new things" but idiomatically has meant "political innovations" or "revolution" since at least the days of Cicero. The word "revolution" can be misleading in the context, and a more appropriate rendering of the Latin could be "the burning desire for change".) Leo first quotes Aquinas affirming private property as a fundamental principle of natural law, then Pope Gregory the Great describing its proper use: "He that hath a talent, let him see that he hide it not; he that hath abundance, let him quicken himself to mercy and generosity; he that hath art and skill, let him do his best to share the use and the utility thereof with his neighbor." Rerum novarum also recognizes the special status of the poor in social issues, expressing God's compassion and favor for them; this is elaborated in the modern Catholic principle of the "preferential option for the poor".

== Criticism of socialism and capitalism ==
In addition to liberalism and other forms of modernism, socialism was first condemned in Syllabus of Errors (1864) by Pope Pius IX. As in his previous encyclical Libertas (1888) which addressed liberalism as the other main 19th-century political movement, in Rerum novarum Leo examines the positive and negative aspects of socialism. Whereas in Quod apostolici muneris (1878) he gave a strong condemnation of socialism, communism, and nihilism, Rerum novarum offers a more nuanced critique that nonetheless ultimately sees certain expressions of socialism as fundamentally wrong. Leo argues that socialists seek to replace natural rights and Catholic moral teaching with the ideology of state power. He argues that this would lead to the destruction of the family unit, where moral, productive individuals are taught and raised most successfully.

Leo opposes socialism for its rejection of private property, stating "the main tenet of socialism, the community of goods, must be utterly rejected", and despite his support for some state intervention, he also rejects socialism for giving too much power to the state. He argues that equality in society is not obtainable "in capability, in diligence, in health, and in strength; an unequal fortune is a necessary result of inequality in condition." In response to the socialist arguments, he writes: "To remedy these wrongs the socialists, working on the poor man's envy of the rich, are striving to do away with private property, and contend that individual possessions should become the common property of all, to be administered by the State or by municipal bodies. They hold that by thus transferring property from private individuals to the community, the present mischievous state of things will be set to rights, inasmuch as each citizen will then get his fair share of whatever there is to enjoy. But their contentions are so clearly powerless to end the controversy that were they carried into effect the working man himself would be among the first to suffer. They are, moreover, emphatically unjust, for they would rob the lawful possessor, distort the functions of the State, and create utter confusion in the community."

Although it criticizes socialism, Rerum novarum equally opposes laissez-faire capitalism and individualism. Leo writes of "the cruelty of grasping speculators who use human beings as mere instruments for making money" and calls for the government to ensure that the poor are "housed, clothed and enabled to support life". In this sense, Rerum novarum argues that the state should not only make interventions for the common good but particularly for the poor and the working class, and this could be used to argue for certain socialist policies despite its condemnation of socialism "as an answer to social problems". In another passage, Leo writes: "But all agree, and there can be no question whatever, that some remedy must be found, and quickly found, for the misery and wretchedness which press so heavily at this moment on the large majority of the very poor."

== Rights and duties ==
In many cases, governments had acted solely to support the interests of businesses, while suppressing labor unions' attempts to bargain for better working conditions. To build social harmony, the Pope proposes a framework of reciprocal rights and duties between workers and employers. Some of the duties of workers are "fully and faithfully" to perform their agreed-upon tasks, to individually refrain from vandalism or personal violence, and to collectively refrain from rioting and insurrection. Some of the duties of employers are to provide work suited to each person's strength, gender, and age, and to respect the dignity of workers and not treat them as bondmen. By reminding workers and employers of their rights and duties, the Church can form and awaken their conscience; however, the Pope also recommends that civil authorities act to protect workers' rights and to keep the peace. The law should intervene no further than necessary to stop abuses. In stating the rights and duties of both workers and employers in Rerum novarum, the Church officially organized its effort against the socialist movement.

== Principles ==
=== Dignity of the person ===
Leo states that "according to natural reason and Christian philosophy, working for gain is creditable, not shameful, to a man, since it enables him to earn an honorable livelihood." He asserts that God has given human dignity to each person, creating them in God's image and endowing them with free will and immortal souls. To respect their workers' dignity in the workplace, employers should give time off from work to worship God, and to fulfill family obligations; give periods of rest, not expecting work for long hours that preclude adequate sleep; not require work under unsafe conditions with danger of bodily harm; not require work under immoral conditions that endanger the soul; and pay a fair daily wage, for which employees should give a full day's work.

The Pope specifically mentions work in the mining sector, and outdoor work in certain seasons, as dangerous to health and requiring additional protections. He condemns the use of child labor as interfering with education and the development of children, stating that children should not be placed in "workshops and factories until their bodies and minds are sufficiently mature" and seeks to shield children from work "which is suitable for a strong man". Fair wages are defined in Rerum novarum as "enough to support the wage-earner in reasonable and frugal comfort". Leo recommends paying enough to support the worker, his wife, and family, with a little savings left over for the worker to improve his condition over time. He also prefers that women work at home.

=== Common good ===
Without recommending one form of government over another, Leo puts forth principles for the appropriate role of the state. The primary purpose of a state is to provide for the common good. All people have equal dignity regardless of social class, and a good government protects the rights and cares for the needs of all its members, rich and poor. Everyone can contribute to the common good in some important way. Leo asserts no one should be forced to share his goods; when one is blessed with material wealth, they have a duty to use this to benefit as many others as possible. The Catechism of the Catholic Church lists three principal aspects of the common good: 1) respect for the human person and his rights; 2) social well-being and development; and 3) peace, "the stability and security of a just order".

The Pope argued that workers, as the producers of goods, should have their basic needs met and live lives free of poverty, with public authority making this a reality:

an abundance of corporeal and external goods is likewise a characteristic of a well constituted State, "the use of which goods is necessary for the practice of virtue." To produce these goods the labor of the workers, whether they expend their skill and strength on farms or in factories, is most efficacious and necessary. Nay, in this respect, their energy and effectiveness are so important that it is incontestable that the wealth of nations originates from no other source than from the labor of workers. Equity therefore commands that public authority show proper concern for the worker so that from what he contributes to the common good he may receive what will enable him, housed, clothed, and secure, to live his life without hardship. Whence, it follows that all those measures ought to be favored which seem in any way capable of benefiting the condition of workers. Such solicitude is so far from injuring anyone, that it is destined rather to benefit all, because it is of absolute interest to the State that those citizens should not be miserable in every respect from whom such necessary goods proceed.

=== Subsidiarity ===
According to Leo, socialism seeks to replace the rights and duties of parents, families, and communities with the central supervision of the state. The civil government should not intrude into the family, the basic building block of society; if a family finds itself in exceeding distress due to illness, injury, or natural disaster, this extreme necessity should be met with public aid, since each family is a part of the commonwealth. By the same token, if there occur a grave disturbance of mutual rights within a household, public authority should intervene to give each party its proper due. Authorities should only intervene when a family or community is unable or unwilling to fulfill its mutual rights and duties.

== Rights and duties of property ownership ==
While criticizing liberalism, individualism, and unrestricted capitalism, Leo supports private property. Quoting Aquinas, Leo writes: "Private ownership, as we have seen, is the natural right of man, and to exercise that right, especially as members of society, is not only lawful, but absolutely necessary. 'It is lawful,' says St. Thomas Aquinas, 'for a man to hold private property; and it is also necessary for the carrying on of human existence.'" In another passage, he argues: "Whoever has received from the divine bounty a large share of temporal blessings, whether they be external and material, or gifts of the mind, has received them for the purpose of using them for the perfecting of his own nature, and, at the same time, that he may employ them, as the steward of God's providence, for the benefit of others."

== Preferential option for the poor ==
Leo emphasizes the dignity of the poor and working classes, and writes: "As for those who possess not the gifts of fortune, they are taught by the Church that in God's sight poverty is no disgrace, and that there is nothing to be ashamed of in earning their bread by labor." Citing the Gospel, he adds: "God Himself seems to incline rather to those who suffer misfortune; for Jesus Christ calls the poor 'blessed'; [Matt.5:3] He lovingly invites those in labor and grief to come to Him for solace; [Matt. 11:28] and He displays the tenderest charity toward the lowly and the oppressed." In regards to the rich and the poor, Leo writes: "The richer class have many ways of shielding themselves, and stand less in need of help from the State; whereas the mass of the poor have no resources of their own to fall back upon, and must chiefly depend upon the assistance of the State. And it is for this reason that wage-earners, since they mostly belong in the mass of the needy, should be specially cared for and protected by the government."

The principle of the "preferential option for the poor" does not appear in Rerum novarum and was developed more fully in radically different ways by later theologians and popes. The phrase "option for the poor" is not without its controversy within Catholic social teaching. Although regularly used into the 21st century, the phrase came into common use only in the 1970s, largely among Latin American liberation theologians, and has accrued little papal rearticulation within the encyclical tradition. In 1968, in response to Paul VI's Populorum progressio (1967), the Latin American bishops met in Medellín, Colombia, and issued a series of documents condemning "structural injustice" (e.g. 1:2, 2:16, 10:2, and 15:1), calling for a "struggle for liberation", and insisting that "in many instances Latin America finds itself faced with a situation of injustice that can be called institutional violence" (2:16). The bishops in Medellín then insisted on giving "effective preference to the poorest and most needy sectors of society", thus giving the first voice to what is now concretized as "the preferential option for the poor". It was at Medellín that the Latin American bishops took the most decisive step toward an "option for the poor".

== Right of association ==
Leo distinguishes the larger civil society (the commonwealth and public society) and smaller private societies within it. Civil society exists to protect the common good and preserve the rights of all equally. Private societies serve various special purposes within civil society. Trade unions are one type of private society, and a special focus of the encyclical. About them, he writes: "The most important of all are workingmen's unions, for these virtually include all the rest. ... [I]t were greatly to be desired that they should become more numerous and more efficient."

Other private societies are families, business partnerships, and religious orders. In Rerum novarum, Leo strongly supports the right of private societies to exist and govern themselves. He writes: "Private societies, then, although they exist within the body politic, and are severally part of the commonwealth, cannot nevertheless be absolutely, and as such, prohibited by public authority. For, to enter into a 'society' of this kind is the natural right of man; and the State has for its office to protect natural rights, not to destroy them[.]" In regards to the state, Leo states: "The State should watch over these societies of citizens banded together in accordance with their rights, but it should not thrust itself into their peculiar concerns and their organization, for things move and live by the spirit inspiring them, and may be killed by the rough grasp of a hand from without."

The Pope deplores government suppression of religious orders and other Catholic organizations. He also supports unions but opposes at least some parts of the then emerging labor movement. He urges workers, if their union seemed on the wrong track, to form alternative associations. About such societies that he criticizes, Leo writes: "Now, there is a good deal of evidence in favor of the opinion that many of these societies are in the hands of secret leaders, and are managed on principles ill-according with Christianity and the public well-being; and that they do their utmost to get within their grasp the whole field of labor, and force working men either to join them or to starve."

== Legacy and influence ==
Rerum novarum is considered a foundational text of modern Catholic social teaching, and Leo came to be popularly known as "The Social Pope" and "The Pope of Workers". In 1891, American economist Henry George wrote an open letter in response to Rerum novarum titled The Condition of Labor. In the letter, George argued that abolishing private property is justified through divine law. Rerum novarum can also be interpreted as a criticism of the perceived illusions of socialism, as well as a primer of the Catholic response to the exploitation of workers. The encyclical contains a proposal for a living wage, although the text does not use this term and instead states: "Wages ought not to be insufficient to support a frugal and well-behaved wage-earner." The American theologian John A. Ryan, also a trained economist, elaborated the idea in his book A Living Wage (1906). Leo XIV chose his papal name in honor of Leo XIII and Rerum novarum, saying in his first address to the College of Cardinals that "Pope Leo XIII, with the historic Encyclical Rerum novarum, addressed the social question in the context of the first great industrial revolution."

Rerum novarum inspired a significant number of Catholic social literature, and even many non-Catholics acclaim it as among the most definite writing on the subject. It was so influential that successive popes wrote encyclicals that celebrated its anniversaries, such Quadragesimo anno, Octogesima adveniens, and Centesimus annus, and Pope Pius XII delivered a radio address on 1 June 1941 to commemorate its fiftieth anniversary. A journalist for The Pall Mall Magazine referred to Rerum novarum as "a magnificent confirmation from the Papal Chair of Cardinal Manning's doctrines". The encyclical also influenced Hilaire Belloc in The Servile State (1912), and Rerum novarum can be considered the first distributist document.

In the latter half of the 19th century, Catholic thought had expanded its focus in the fields of economics and sociology, in large part due to the social upheaval brought about by the advent of mass production, the rise of a definitive capitalist framework, and the rise of labor rights movements. The Catholic social teaching became a central theme for Catholic activists of the era in the wake of Leo's Rerum novarum. In Italy, the Catholic movement in favor of social reforms that referred to Rerum novarum was politically organized into the various Christian democratic parties that later formed post-war Italy's ruling party Democrazia Cristiana. Many conservative Catholics considered Rerum novarum to be strongly progressive in character. Through the Catholic Worker, a platform for the Catholic Worker Movement by Dorothy Day and Peter Maurin, many American Catholics became conscious of Rerum novarum and Leo's social doctrine.

From a socialist perspective, Rerum novarum can be described as being situated between laborers and industrialists, and opened up space for anti-capitalist critique and at the same time restricted it; it envisioned a cooperative workplace with management shared by workers and employers. Despite its condemnation of socialism, Leo and his Rerum novarum were influential on the mainstream socialist and labourist parties, particularly the Labour Party in Ireland. Others, notably Archbishop Victor Sanabria, interpreted the encyclical as not rejecting socialism. In particular, socialists contested the understanding and condemnation of socialism, and argued that it conflated private and personal property. Christian socialists, such as John Wheatley and Samuel Keeble, rejected the mutually exclusive claim, which was reiterated by Pius XI in Quadragesimo anno, "by virtue of its consistent endorsement of the legitimate claims of the working class" and that the encyclical had de facto endorsed many aspects of the labor movement's social and political program, particularly "affirming some of the political devices by which socialism was to be approached (a living wage, rights of association)".

With the regime established in Portugal under António de Oliveira Salazar in the 1930s, many key ideas from the encyclical were incorporated into Portuguese law. The Estado Novo ("New State") promulgated by Salazar accepted the idea of corporatism as an economic model, especially in labor relations. Its basic policies were deeply rooted in European Catholic social thought, especially those deriving from Rerum novarum. Portuguese intellectuals, workers organizations and trade unions, and other study groups were everywhere present after 1890 in many Portuguese republican circles, as well as the conservative circles that produced Salazar. In this sense, the Catholic social movement was not only powerful in its own right but also resonated with an older Portuguese political culture that emphasized a natural law tradition, patrimonialism, centralized direction and control, and the perceived natural orders and hierarchies of society.

== See also ==
- Catholic Church and politics
- Catholic communism
- List of encyclicals of Pope Leo XIII
