= List of canonically crowned images =

Sacred Coronation

The following list enumerates a selection of Marian, Josephian, and Christological images venerated in the Roman Catholic Church, authorised by a Pope who has officially granted a papal bull of Pontifical coronation to be carried out either by the Pontiff, his papal legate or a papal nuncio. The prescription of the solemn rite to crown venerated images is embedded in the Ordo Coronandi Imaginem Beatæ Mariæ Virginis published by the Holy Office on 25 May 1981.

Prior to 1989, pontifical decrees concerning the authorization of canonical coronations were handwritten on parchment. After 1989, the Dicastery for Divine Worship and the Discipline of the Sacraments began issuing the specific recognition to crown a religious image, spelling out its approved devotional title and authorizing papal legate. Several venerated images of Jesus Christ and Saint Joseph have also been granted a pontifical coronation. (Note: In the cases of diadems attached to images of "Saint Anne, parent of the neophyte Blessed Virgin", the Rosary Pope clarified through the Sacred Congregation of Rites that it is a Marian image which merits a decree of Pontifical coronation, and the diadem attached to the image of Saint Anne is pure novelty or ornamental.)

Coronations in the 17th century were conducted exclusively in Italy. The first coronation outside Italian borders did not take place until the 18th century when the image of Our Lady of Trsat was crowned by pope Clement XI. The image is kept in Basilica of Our Lady of Trsat, in RIjeka, in Croatia.

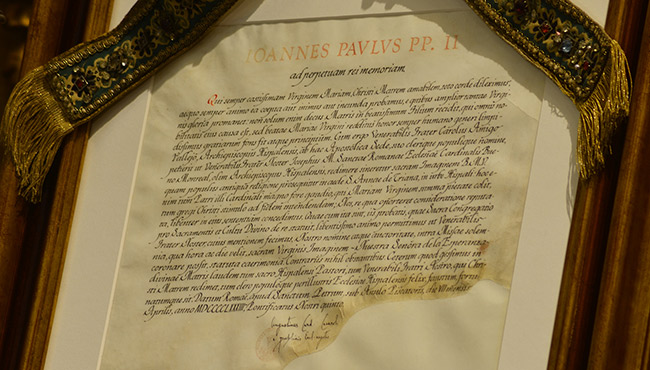
The pontifical decree of canonical coronation Qui Semper granted for the "Virgin of Hope of Triana" in Spain, legally imposing the venerated Marian image the Pontifical right to wear a crown by Pope John Paul II on 7 April 1983

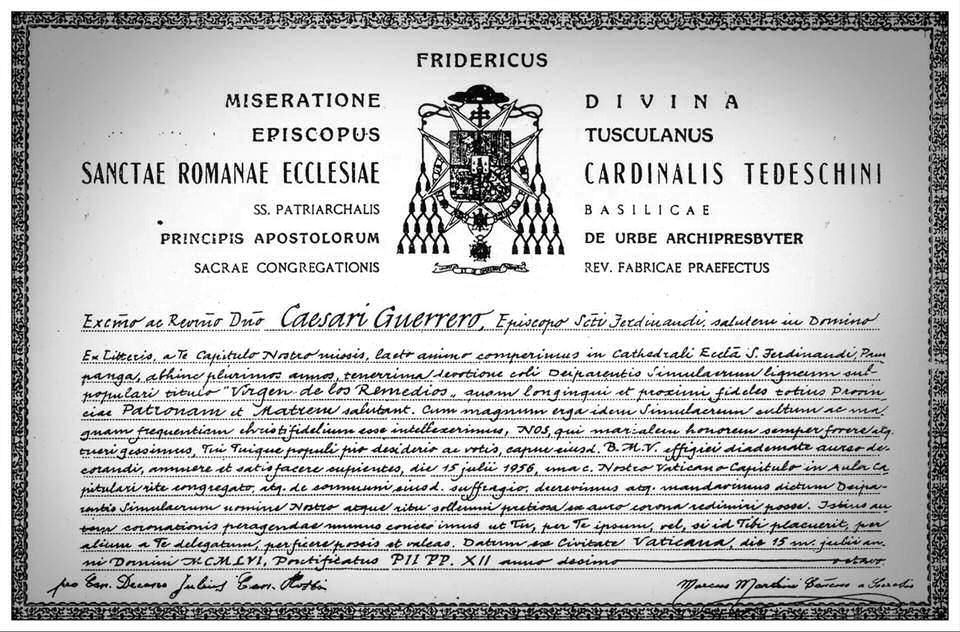
The pontifical decree issued by Pope Pius XII towards the image of Virgen de los Remedios de Pampanga for the Philippines on 15 July 1956

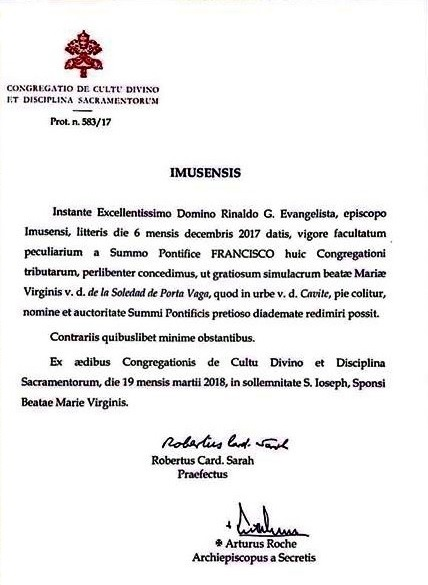
The pontifical decree issued for the icon of Our Lady of Porta Vaga on 19 March 2018. This is the present decree format used by the Dicastery for Divine Worship since 1999.

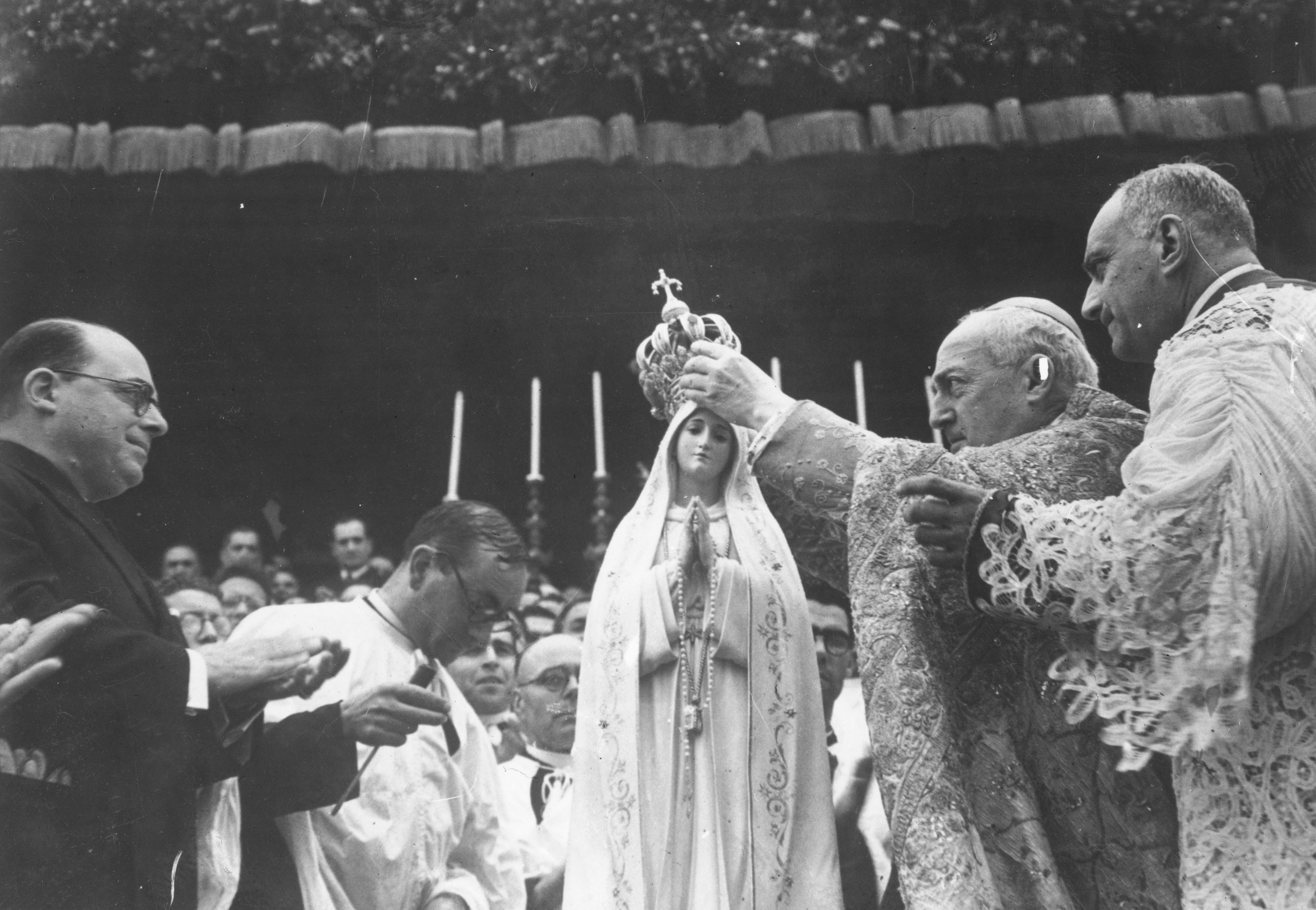
The canonical coronation of the image of "Our Lady of the Holy Rosary of Fatima" by Cardinal Benedetto Aloisi Masella on 13 May 1946

== Pontifically crowned Marian images ==
=== Algeria ===
Official title of the image	Date of coronation	Place of devotion	Authorization by	Marian image	Shrine of devotion
Notre-Dame d'Afrique	30 April 1876	Basilica of Our Lady of Africa, Algiers	Pope Pius IX (Note: Pontifical decree of coronation granted to Primate of Africa, Archbishop Charles Lavigerie on 15 April 1876, as well as the Pontifical decree granting the shrine the status of Minor Basilica, signed by Pope Pius IX. — Sacred Congregation of Rites.)		

=== Andorra ===
Official title of the image	Date of coronation	Place of devotion	Authorization by	Marian image	Shrine of devotion
Mare de Déu de Meritxell	8 September 1921	Basilica Shrine of Our Lady of Meritxell	Pope Benedict XV		
Nostra Senyora de Canòlich	29 May 1999	Shrine of Our Lady of Canòlich, Sant Julià de Lòria	Pope John Paul II		

=== Argentina ===
Official title of the image	Date of coronation	Place of devotion	Authorization by	Marian image	Shrine of devotion
Our Lady of Luján	8 May 1887	Basilica of Our Lady of Luján	Pope Leo XIII		
Virgen del Valle	12 April 1891	Cathedral Basilica of Our Lady of the Valley, San Fernando del Valle de Catamarca	Pope Leo XIII		
Nuestra Señora del Rosario del Milagro	1 October 1892	Basílica de Santo Domingo, Córdoba	Pope Leo XIII		
Our Lady of Itatí	16 July 1900	Basilica of Our Lady of Itatí	Pope Leo XIII		
Virgen del Milagro	13 September 1902	Salta Cathedral	Pope Leo XIII		
Virgen del Carmen	8 September 1911	Basílica de San Francisco, Mendoza	Pope Pius X		
Nuestra Señora de la Merced	24 September 1912	Basilica of Our Lady of Mercy, San Miguel de Tucumán	Pope Pius X		
Nuestra Señora del Rosario de Río Blanca y Paypaya	31 October 1920	Santuario de Río Blanco, Palpala	Pope Benedict XV (Note: Pontifical decree of coronation granted to Bishop of Jujuy, Monsignor Enrique Jose Muhn signed and notarized on 25 March 1920. Pope John XXIII mentioned this coronation when the Marian title was declared as the patroness of the Diocese of Jujuy via his own decree signed on 1 July 1960. Vatican Apostolic Archive.)		
Our Lady of the Rosary of Pompei	20 August 1922	Sanctuary of Our Lady of the Rosary of Pompei, Nueva Pompeya	Pope Pius XI		
Nuestra Señora del Rosario de la Reconquista y Defensa de Buenos Aires	8 October 1922	Convento de Santo Domingo, Buenos Aires	Pope Pius XI		
Our Lady of Guadalupe	22 April 1928	Basilica of Our Lady of Guadalupe, Santa Fe	Pope Pius XI (Note: Pontifical decree of coronation signed and granted to Archbishop Filippo Cortesi on 10 August 1924. — Vatican Secret Archives)		
Virgen de los Milagros	9 May 1936	Santuario de Nuestra Señora de los Milagros, Santa Fe	Pope Pius XI		
Virgen del Rosario	5 October 1941	Cathedral Basilica of Our Lady of the Rosary, Rosario, Santa Fe	Pope Pius XII		
Virgen de las Lagrimas	13 September 1952	Iglesia de Nuestra Señora de las Lagrimas, Salta	Pope Pius XII		
Mary Help of Christians	24 May 1956	Basilica of Mary Help of Christians and Saint Charles, Buenos Aires	Pope Pius XII		
Nuestra Señora de la Merced	24 September 1957	Parish of Our Lady of Mercy, Corrientes	Pope Pius XII		
Virgen del Rosario	21 October 1961	Basilica of Our Lady of the Rosary, Mendoza	Pope Pius XII (Note: The pontifical decree of coronation was granted by Pope Pius XII on 10 May 1954. Vatican Apostolic Archive.)		
Inmaculada Concepción del Buen Viaje	19 November 1961	Cathedral Basilica of the Immaculate Conception of Good Voyage, Morón	Pope John XXIII (Note: Pontifical decree of coronation granted to Cardinal Antonio Caggiano, signed and notarized on 19 December 1960. - Sacred Congregation of Rites.)		
Nuestra Señora de la Merced	17 December 1961	Church of Our Lady of Mercy, Maipú, Mendoza	Pope John XXIII		
Our Lady of Mount Carmel	16 July 1966	Our Lady of Carmel Cathedral, Formosa	Pope Paul VI		
Our Lady of Mount Carmel	16 July 1967	Basilica Shrine of Our Lady of Mount Carmel, Nogoyá	Pope Paul VI		
Virgen del Rosario	8 December 1973	Our Lady of the Rosary Cathedral, Paraná	Pope Paul VI		
Virgen de la Consolación	21 November 2009	Shrine Parish of Our Lady of Consolation, Sumampa	Pope Benedict XVI (Note: Pope Benedict XVI, Congregation for Divine Worship and the Discipline of the Sacraments — Protocol Number: 116/01/L, Archdiocese of Santiago del Estero, 24 June 2008. Vatican Apostolic Archive.)		
La Virgen Niña	8 September 2013	Basilica of the Nativity of the Blessed Virgin Mary, Esperanza	Pope Benedict XVI (Note: Pope Benedict XVI, Congregation for Divine Worship and the Discipline of the Sacraments — Protocol Number: 14/13/L, Archdiocese of Santa Fe de la Vera Cruz, 22 February 2013. Vatican Apostolic Archive.)		
Virgen de la Scala	7 January 2017	Parish of the Holy Family, Mar del Plata	Pope Francis (Note: Pope Francis, Congregation for Divine Worship and the Discipline of the Sacraments — Protocol Number: 221/16, Diocese of Mar del Plata, 13 May 2016. Vatican Apostolic Archive.)		
Virgen de la Merced de los Maitines	7 November 2021	Basilica of Our Lady of Mercy, Córdoba	Pope Francis (Note: Pope Francis, Congregation for Divine Worship and the Discipline of the Sacraments — Protocol Number: 549/18, Archdiocese of Córdoba, 4 March 2019. Vatican Secret Archives.)		
Virgen de Huachana	31 July 2022	Santuario de Nuestra Señora de Huachana, Santiago del Estero Province	Pope Francis (Note: Pope Francis, Congregation for Divine Worship and the Discipline of the Sacraments — Protocol Number: 138/20, Diocese of Añatuya, 16 June 2020. Vatican Secret Archives.)		

=== Austria ===
Official title of the image	Date of coronation	Place of devotion	Authorization by	Marian image	Shrine of devotion
Maria Plain	14 July 1751	Basilica of Assumption of Bergheim	Pope Benedict XIV (Note: Pontifical decree of coronation redeclared by Pope Pius XII via Gementium Solatrix on 22 September 1951 for the second centenary of its coronation with the raising of its status to a Minor Basilica. Notarized by the Grand Chancellor of Apostolic Briefs, Monsignor Gildo Brugnola.)		
Our Lady of the Sacred Heart	25 October 1874	Innsbruck Cathedral	Pope Pius IX		
Unserer Lieben Frau unter den vier Säulen	10 September 1893	Wilten Basilica, Innsbruck	Pope Leo XIII		
Our Lady of Mariazell	8 September 1908	Mariazell Basilica	Pope Pius X		
Our Lady of Grace (Gnadenbild)	8 September 1908	Maria Waldrast, Matrei am Brenner	Pope Pius X		
Our Lady of Grace (Gnadenbild)	28 September 1913	Maria Luggau, Lesachtal	Pope Pius X (Note: Pontifical decree of coronation granted to the Archbishop of Salzburg and Bishop of Gurk, Baltazar Kaltner on 9 March 1913. Vatican Apostolic Archive.)		
Maria mit dem Geneigten Haupt	27 September 1931	Döbling Carmelite Monastery	Pope Pius XI		

=== Belarus ===
Official title of the image	Date of coronation	Place of devotion	Authorization by	Marian image	Shrine of devotion
Mother of God of Zhyrovichy	19 September 1730	Zhyrovichy Monastery	Pope Benedict XIII (Note: The coronation is authorized by Pope Benedict XIII in 1726. Due to political events it did not take place until 1730. It was originally scheduled for 8 September 1728.)		
Our Lady of Byalynichy	20 September 1761	Church of the Mother of God of Byalynichy	Pope Benedict XIV		
Our Lady of Brest	30 June 1996	Church of the Exaltation of the Holy Cross, Brest	Pope John Paul II		
Our Lady of Lahishyn	10 May 1997	Parish Church of Saints Peter and Paul, Lahishyn	Pope John Paul II		
Our Lady of Budslau	2 July 1998	Basilica of the Assumption—National Shrine of the Mother of God of Budslaw	Pope John Paul II		
Our Lady of Congregation	28 August 2005	St. Francis Xavier Cathedral, Grodno	Pope John Paul II (Note: Pope Benedict XVI, Congregation for Divine Worship and the Discipline of the Sacraments — Protocol Number: 309/03/L, Diocese of Grodno, 4 March 2003. Vatican Apostolic Archive.)		
Our Lady of Gudogai	15 July 2007	Shrine of Our Lady of the Holy Scapular—Church of the Visitation of the Blessed Virgin Mary, Gudogai, Grodno	Pope Benedict XVI (Note: Pope Benedict XVI, Congregation for Divine Worship and the Discipline of the Sacraments — Protocol Number: 552/06/L, Diocese of Grodno, 18 May 2006. Vatican Apostolic Archive.)		
Our Lady, Queen of Families	5 July 2009	Trokeli	Pope Benedict XVI		

=== Belgium ===
Official title of the image	Date of coronation	Place of devotion	Authorization by	Marian image	Shrine of devotion
Our Lady of Vlaanderen	9 May 1860	College of Saint Barbara, Gent	Pope Pius IX		
Our Lady of Virga Jesse	15 August 1867	Virga Jesse Basilica	Pope Pius IX		
Our Lady of Scherpenheuvel	25 August 1872	Basilica of Scherpenheuvel, Zichem	Pope Pius IX		
Our Lady of Halle	4 October 1874	Saint Martin's Basilica, Halle	Pope Pius IX		
Our Lady of Walcourt	11 July 1875	Basilica of Saint Maternus, Walcourt	Pope Pius IX		
Our Lady of Hanswijk	30 July 1876	Basilica of Our Lady of Hanswijk, Mechelen	Pope Pius IX		
Our Lady of Tongre	8 September 1881	Basilica of Our Lady of Tongre	Pope Leo XIII		
Our Lady of Oudenberg	31 July 1887	Chapel of Our Lady of Oudenberg, Geraardsbergen	Pope Leo XIII		
Our Lady of Lourdes	5 August 1888	Basilica of Our Lady of Lourdes, Oostakker	Pope Leo XIII		
Our Lady of Tongeren (Virgin of Cause of Joy)	31 August 1890	Basilica of Our Lady, Tongeren	Pope Leo XIII		
Our Lady of Kerselare	11 September 1892	Chapel of Our Lady of Kerselare	Pope Leo XIII		
Our Lady of the Recollects	16 October 1892	Church of Our Lady of the Recollects, Verviers	Pope Leo XIII		
Our Lady of the Sarte	29 June 1896	Sanctuary of Our Lady of the Sarte, Huy	Pope Leo XIII		
Our Lady of Basse Wavre	26 June 1897	Basilique Notre-Dame de Basse Wavre, Wavre	Pope Leo XIII		
Our Lady of Kortenbos	1 May 1898	Sint-Truiden	Pope Leo XIII		
Our Lady of Antwerp	22 August 1899	Cathedral of Our Lady (Antwerp)	Pope Leo XIII		
Our Lady of Dadizele	20 April 1902	Basilica of Our Lady of Dadizele, Moorslede	Pope Leo XIII		
Our Lady of Arlon	14 September 1904	Church of Saint Donatus, Arlon	Pope Pius X		
Our Lady of Good Help	24 April 1905	Basilica of Our Lady of Good Help, Péruwelz	Pope Pius X		
Our Lady of Fevers	19 June 1907	Franciscan Church of Our Lady of Fever, Leuven (former location) Parish Church of Saint Joseph, Leuven (present shrine since the 1980s)	Pope Pius X		Former Present
Our Lady of Lebbeke	26 April 1908	Church of Our Lady of Nativity, Lebbeke	Pope Pius X		
Our Lady of the Sacred Heart	21 August 1910	Averbode Abbey	Pope Pius X		
Our Lady of Gaverland	4 August 1912	Chapel of Our Lady of Gaverland, Melsele	Pope Pius X		
Our Lady of Lede	2 August 1914	Church of Saint Martin de Tours, Lede, Belgium	Pope Pius X		
Our Lady of the Rampart	20 July 1919	Chapel of Our Lady of the Rampart, Namur	Pope Benedict XV		
Our Lady of Chèvremont	9 September 1923	Basilica of Our Lady of Chèvremont, Chaudfontaine	Pope Pius XI		
Our Lady of Jezus-Eik	15 August 1924	Church of Our Lady in Jezus-Eik, Overijse	Pope Pius XI		
Sedes Sapientiae	29 June 1927	Saint Peter's Church, Leuven	Pope Pius XI (Note: The coronation was granted by Pope Pius XI on 26 June 1926.)		
Our Lady of Laeken	17 May 1936	Church of Our Lady of Laeken	Pope Pius XI		
Our Lady of Groeninge	6 July 1952	Saint Michael's Church, Kortrijk	Pope Pius XII		
Our Lady of Seven Sorrows	30 August 1964	The Forest Chapel of Buggenhout	Pope Paul VI		
Our Lady of Sorrows	16 September 2001	Chapel of Our Lady of Piety (Note: Under the jurisdiction of the Parish Church of Saint-Géry.), Baudour	Pope John Paul II (Note: Pope John Paul II, Congregation for Divine Worship and the Discipline of the Sacraments — Protocol Number: 723/01/L, Diocese of Tournai, 17 January 2002. Vatican Apostolic Archive.)		

=== Bolivia ===
Official title of the image	Date of coronation	Place of devotion	Authorization by	Marian image	Shrine of devotion
Virgen de Candelaria de Copacabana	1 August 1925	Basilica of Our Lady of Copacabana	Pope Pius XI (Note: Pontifical decree of coronation granted on 29 July 1925 to the Order of Saint Francis for the "Marian Eucharistic Congress". Notarized by Secretary of Apostolic Dataria, Monsignor Domenico Jorio, Vatican Apostolic Archive.)		
Virgen de Guadalupe	20 December 1938	Metropolitan Cathedral Basilica of Our Lady of Guadalupe, Sucre	Pope Pius XI (Note: The pontifical decree of coronation was granted by Pope Pius XI on 25 May 1938. Vatican Apostolic Archive.)		
Virgen de Cotoca	8 December 1954	Shrine of Our Lady of Cotoca	Pope Pius XII (Note: The pontifical decree of coronation was granted by Pope Pius XII on 15 March 1953. Vatican Apostolic Archive.)		
Virgen del Socavón	5 November 2000	Basílica Santuario de Nuestra Señora del Socavón, Oruro	Pope John Paul II (Note: Pope John Paul II, Congregation for Divine Worship and the Discipline of the Sacraments — Protocol Number: 1898/00/L, Diocese of Oruro, 17 November 2000. Vatican Apostolic Archive.)		

=== Brazil ===
Official title of the image	Date of coronation	Place of devotion	Authorization by	Marian image	Shrine of devotion
Our Lady of Immaculate Conception Aparecida	8 September 1904	"Old" Basilica of Our Lady Aparecida (former, before 1982) Cathedral Basilica of the National Shrine of Our Lady Aparecida (current)	Pope Pius X		Former Present
Our Lady of Mount Carmel of Recife	21 September 1919	Basilica and Convent of Our Lady of Mount Carmel, Recife	Pope Benedict XV		
Our Lady of the Rock	8 September 1951	Convento da Penha, Vila Velha	Pope Pius XII		
Our Lady of Nazareth	15 August 1953	Basilica of Our Lady of Nazareth of Exile, Belém	Pope Pius XII (Note: Pontifical decree of coronation titled Comperimus Sane Perlibenter granted to Archbishop of Salvador da Bahia, Cardinal Augusto da Silva on 9 July 1953. Vatican Apostolic Archive.)		
Our Lady of the Presentation	21 November 1953	Parish of Our Lady of the Presentation, Natal (Old cathedral, former location) Metropolitan Cathedral of Our Lady of the Presentation, Natal (present shrine since 1988)	Pope Pius XII (Note: Pontifical decree of coronation titled Quae Mortalibus granted on 17 November 1953 by Pope Pius XII as a "special mandate" (De Speciali Mandatum Sanctissimi) or Motu Proprio, both signed and notarized by Grand Chancellor of Apostolic Briefs, Monsigneur Gildo Brugnola. Vatican Apostolic Archive.)		Former Present
Our Lady of the Pillar	12 October 1954	Cathedral Basilica of Our Lady of the Pillar, São João del Rei	Pope Pius XII (Note: Pontifical decree of coronation redeclared by Pope Paul VI via Religione Almæ Deiparæ Virginis which also raised the shrine of the status of Minor Basilica on 24 September 1964. Signed and notarized by the Vatican Secretary of State, Cardinal Amleto Giovanni Cicognani. Vatican Apostolic Archive.)		
Our Lady of Montserrat	8 September 1955	Shrine of Our Lady of Montserrat, Santos, São Paulo	Pope Pius XII		
Our Lady of Mount Carmel	16 July 1961	Church of Our Lady of Mount Carmel, Mariana, Minas Gerais	Pope John XXIII		
Our Lady of the Rosary	7 December 1961	Parish of Our Lady of the Rosary, Ubá	Pope John XXIII (Note: Pontifical decree of coronation titled Quae Rosarii granted to Bishop of Leopoldina, Geraldo Ferreira Reis on 8 November 1961. Vatican Apostolic Archive.)		
Our Lady of the Pillar	8 July 1963	Basilica of Our Lady of the Pillar, Ouro Preto	Pope John XXIII		
Our Lady of Immaculate Conception	15 August 1963	Parish of the Immaculate Conception, Conselheiro Lafaiete	Pope John XXIII (Note: Pontifical decree of coronation titled Quidquid ad Pietatam granted to the Archbishop of Mariana, Oscar de Oliveira on 17 August 1961. The coronation took place on 15 August 1963 at the time of Pope Paul VI's pontificate. Vatican Apostolic Archive.)		
Our Lady of Immaculate Conception	8 December 1964	Parish of the Immaculate Conception, Sabará	Pope Paul VI		
Our Lady of Piety	11 December 1979	Parish of Our Lady of Piety, Lagarto, Sergipe	Pope John Paul II (Note: Sacra Congregatio pro Sacramentis et Cultu Divino: Prot. CD 1264/79, Diocese of Estância, 11 December 1979. Vatican Apostolic Archive.)		
Our Lady of Good Voyage	15 August 1980	Parish of Our Lady of Good Voyage, Itabirito	Pope John Paul II (Note: Sacra Congregatio pro Sacramntis et Cultu Divino: Prot. CD 596/79, Archdiocese of Mariana, 5 September 1979. Vatican Apostolic Archive.)		
Our Lady, Immaculate Queen of Sertão	Decreed on 28 April 2005	Sanctuary of Our Lady Immaculate Queen of Sertão, Quixadá	Pope Benedict XVI (Note: Pope Benedict XVI, Congregation for Divine Worship and the Discipline of the Sacraments — Protocol Number: 601/05/L, Diocese of Quixadá, 28 April 2005. Vatican Apostolic Archive.)		
Our Lady of the Rock	1 September 2014	Cathedral of Our Lady of the Rock, Crato, Ceará	Pope Francis (Note: Pope Francis, COngregation for Divine Worship and the Discipline of the Sacraments — Protocol Number: 237/14/L, Diocese of Crato, 27 May 2014. Vatican Apostolic Archive.)		
Our Lady of Patronage of the Most Blessed Sacrament	31 May 2015	Basilica of the Most Blessed Sacrament, Sacramento, Minas Gerais	Pope Francis (Note: Pope Francis, Congregation for Divine Worship and the Discipline of the Sacraments — Protocol Number: 174/14/L, Archdiocese of Uberaba, 8 April 2014. Vatican Apostolic Archive.)		
Our Lady of Divine Love	14 November 2021	Sanctuary of Our Lady of Divine Love, Corrêas, Petrópolis	Pope Francis (Note: Pope Francis, Congregation for Divine Worship and the Discipline of the Sacraments — Protocol Number: 360/20, Diocese of Petrópolis, 2 February 2021. Vatican Apostolic Archive.)		
Our Lady of the Abbey	1 August 2024	Basilica Shrine of Our Lady of the Abbey, Uberaba	Pope Francis (Note: Pope Francis, Dicastery for Divine Worship and the Discipline of the Sacraments — Protocol Number: 511/21, Archdiocese of Uberaba, 3 October 2023. Vatican Apostolic Archive.)		
Our Lady Mediatrix of All Graces, Queen of the Gauchos	15 August 2024	Basilica Shrine of Our Lady Mediatrix of All Graces, Santa Maria, Rio Grande do Sul	Pope Francis (Note: Pope Francis, Dicastery for Divine Worship and the Discipline of the Sacraments — Protocol Number: 286/24, Archdiocese of Santa Maria, 31 May 2024. Vatican Apostolic Archive.)		
Our Lady of Nazareth	8 September 2025	Parish of Our Lady of Nazareth, Cachoeira do Campo, Ouro Preto	Pope Leo XIV (Note: Pope Leo XIV, Dicastery for Divine Worship and the Discipline of the Sacraments — Protocol Number: 56/25, Archdiocese of Mariana, 9 June 2025. Vatican Apostolic Archive.)		
Our Lady of Mercy	13 September 2026	Parish of the Sacred Heart of Jesus and Our Lady of Mercy, Brasília	Pope Leo XIV (Note: Pope Leo XIV, Dicastery for Divine Worship and the Discipline of the Sacraments — Protocol Number: 607/25, Archdiocese of Brasília, 7 October 2025. Vatican Apostolic Archive.)		

=== Canada ===
Official title of the image	Date of coronation	Place of devotion	Authorization by	Marian image	Shrine of devotion
Saint Anne of Varennes	26 July 1842	Sainte-Anne de Varennes Basilica	Pope Gregory XVI		
Saint Anne of Beaupré	14 September 1887	Basilica and National Shrine of Saint Anne, Sainte-Anne-de-Beaupré	Pope Leo XIII		
Our Lady of the Cape	12 October 1904 15 August 1954	Basilica and National Shrine of Our Lady of the Cape, Trois-Rivières	Pope Pius X Pope Pius XII (Note: Pontifical decree of coronation titled Per Magnus Profecto granted on 2 July 1954 to Cardinal Valerio Valeri as Papal legate. Vatican Apostolic Archive.)		
Our Lady of Immaculate Conception	1 October 2022	Basilica and Diocesan Marian Shrine of Our Lady Immaculate, Guelph	Pope Francis (Note: Pope Francis, Congregation for Divine Worship and the Discipline of the Sacraments — Protocol Number: 552/19, Diocese of Hamilton, 8 December 2019. Vatican Apostolic Archive.)		

=== Chile ===
Official title of the image	Date of coronation	Place of devotion	Authorization by	Marian image	Shrine of devotion
Nuestra Señora del Santísimo Rosario de Andacollo	26 December 1901	Basilica of Our Lady of Andacollo, Coquimbo	Pope Leo XIII (Note: Pontifical decree of coronation granted to Cardinal Mariano Rampolla del Tindaro on 15 June 1899, with a special Papal benediction given to the Order of Claretian sisters, who promised to distribute the devotion to the Blessed Virgin Mary under this Marian title. Vatican Apostolic Archive.)		
Nuestra Señora de la Merced de Santiago	22 September 1918	Basilica de la Merced, Santiago	Pope Benedict XV (Note: Pontifical decree of coronation granted to Cardinal Rafael Merry del Val, signed and notarized by Canon priest of the Church of Saint Candida the Elder, Giulio Malvezzi and Guardian Chancellor of the Apostolic Briefs, Monsignor Giuseppe Cascioli on 20 February 1918. Vatican Apostolic Archive.)		
Nuestra Señora del Carmen de Santiago	19 December 1926	Santiago Metropolitan Cathedral	Pope Pius XI		
Nuestra Señora del Socorro de Santiago	25 November 1953	Iglesia de San Francisco, Santiago	Pope Pius XII		
Our Lady of Lourdes	12 February 1966	Church and Grotto of Our Lady of Lourdes, Viña del Mar	Pope John XXIII (Note: Pontifical decree of coronation titled "Egregium Simulacrum" granted on 6 August 1962, to Cardinal Raúl Silva Henríquez, Archbishop of the Roman Catholic Archdiocese of Santiago de Chile. Signed by Cardinal Cicognani. Vatican Apostolic Archive.)		
Nuestra Señora del Carmen de San Bernardo	21 December 2000	St. Bernard Cathedral, San Bernardo	Pope John Paul II (Note: Pope John Paul II, Congregation for Divine Worship and the Discipline of the Sacraments — Protocol Number: 2648/00/L, Diocese of San Bernardo, 21 December 2000. Vatican Apostolic Archive.)		

=== China ===
Official title of the image	Date of coronation	Place of devotion	Authorization by	Marian image	Shrine of devotion
Our Mother of Sheshan	8 May 1946	Basilica of Mary Help of Christians—National Shrine of Our Mother of Sheshan	Pope Pius XII		

=== Colombia ===
Official title of the image	Date of coronation	Place of devotion	Authorization by	Marian image	Shrine of devotion
Our Lady of the Rosary of Chiquinquirá	9 July 1919	Basilica and National Shrine of Our Lady of the Rosary of Chiquinquirá	Pope Pius X (Note: Pontifical decree of coronation granted on 9 January 1910. Signed by Cardinal Angelo di Pietro and notarized by the Sacred Congregation of Rites. Vatican Apostolic Archive.)		
Nuestra Señora de Monguí	8 September 1929	Basilica of Our Lady of Monguí, Boyacá	Pope Pius XI (Note: Pontifical decree of coronation granted to the Bishop of Tunja, Eduardo Calvo y Maldonado on the Feast of Nativity of Mary. The coronation was mentioned through the papal bull titled Sedes Religionis dated 4 June 1966; the official patronage was accorded by Pope Pius XII in 1955, signed and notarized by titular Bishop of Tuscany, Cardinal Amleto Giovanni Cicognani. Vatican Apostolic Archive.)		
Nuestra Señora del Carmen de Apicalá	16 July 1942	National Shrine of Our Lady of Mount Carmel, Carmen de Apicalá	Pope Pius XI (Note: Coronation authorized by the Vatican through a papal bull dated 1 March 1934. Vatican Apostolic Archive.)		
Nuestra Señora de la Merced	8 December 1942	Church of Our Lady of Mercy, San Juan de Pasto	Pope Pius XII (Note: Coronation decree granted by Pope Pius XII on 25 March 1942. Vatican Apostolic Archive.)		
Nuestra Señora de la Candelaria	15 August 1950	Basilica of Our Lady of Candelaria, Medellín	Pope Pius XII		
Nuestra Señora del Rosario de las Lajas	16 September 1952	Basilica of Our Lady of the Rosary of Las Lajas, Ipiales	Pope Pius XII		
Niña María	8 September 1954	Santuario de la Niña María, Caloto, Cauca	Pope Pius XII		
Nuestra Señora del Rosario de Arma	8 February 1959	Concatedral de San Nicolás el Magno, Rionegro	Pope Pius XII (Note: Pontifical decree of coronation granted to the Archbishop of Santiago de Cali, Alberto Uribe y Urdaneta signed on 6 July 1958. The rite of coronation was executed by the Papal nuncio to the country, Cardinal Paolo Bertoli. Vatican Apostolic Archive.)		
Nuestra Señora de Chiquinquirá de La Estrella	13 September 1959	Basilica of Our Lady of Chiquinquirá, La Estrella, Antioquia	Pope John XXIII (Note: Pontifical decree of coronation titled Nemo Ignorat granted to the Archbishop of Medellín, Tulio Botero y Salazar on 28 November 1958, as signed by Cardinal Domenico Tardini and notarized by the Secretary of the Apostolic Dataria, Monsignor Marco Martini. Vatican Apostolic Archive.)		
La Virgen Inmaculada Concepción, "La Conchita" de Carolina	8 December 1964	Church of the Immaculate Conception, Carolina del Príncipe	Pope Pius XII (Note: Pontifical decree of coronation granted to the Bishop of Santa Rosa de Osos, Miguel Ángel Builes on 8 December 1954. Signed by the initial promoter of the decree, the Archbishop of Bogotá, Aníbal Muñoz Duque and notarized by the Secretary of the Apostolic Dataria, Monsignor Marco Martini. Vatican Apostolic Archive.)		
Nuestra Señora del Carmen	25 July 1971	Basilica of Our Lady of Mount Carmel, La Ceja	Pope Paul VI (Note: Pontifical decree of coronation granted on 24 May 1970 to the Bishop of Sonson—Rionegro, Alfonso Uribe y Jaramillo. The rite of coronation was executed by the Papal nuncio to the country, Archbishop Angelo Palmas. Vatican Apostolic Archive.)		
Inmaculada Concepción	29 July 1975	Cathedral Basilica of Santa Marta	Pope Paul VI (Note: Sacra Congregatio pro Sacramentis et Cultu Divino: Prot. n. 1083/72, Diocese of Santa Marta, 17 October 1972. Vatican Apostolic Archive.)		
Nuestra Señora de la Visitación	2 July 1982	Shrine of Our Lady of the Visitation—Parish of Saint Peter the Apostle, Ancuya	Pope John Paul II		
Nuestra Señora de las Misericordias (Note: The image that was crowned was the one just outside the main church building.)	8 September 1984	Basílica de Nuestra Señora de las Misericordias, Santa Rosa de Osos	Pope John Paul II		
Nuestra Señora del Rosario	31 May 1985	Shrine of Our Lady of the Rosary—Parish of Saint John the Baptist, Iles, Nariño	Pope John Paul II		
Nuestra Señora de las Mercedes	4 July 1986	Church of Our Lady of Mercy, Santiago de Cali	Pope John Paul II		
Nuestra Señora de la Candelaria de La Popa	6 July 1986	Convento de la Popa, Cartagena de Indias	Pope John Paul II		
Nuestra Señora del Amparo	21 March 1987	Parish of Our Lady of Protection, Chinavita	Pope John Paul II		
Nuestra Señora de la Asunción	15 August 1988	Parish of Our Lady of the Assumption, Marinilla	Pope John Paul II		
Nuestra Señora de la Playa	6 June 2001	Shrine of Our Lady of the Beach, San Pablo, Nariño	Pope John Paul II (Note: Pope John Paul II, Congregation for Divine Worship and the Discipline of the Sacraments — Protocol Number: 818/00/L, Diocese of Pasto, 24 July 2000. Vatican Apostolic Archive.)		
Nuestra Señora del Rosario	14 September 2008	Shrine Parish of Our Lady of the Rosary, Río de Oro, Cesar	Pope Benedict XVI (Note: Pope Benedict XVI, Congregation for Divine Worship and the Discipline of the Sacraments — Protocol Number: 472/08/L, Diocese of Ocaña, 6 May 2008. Vatican Apostolic Archive.)		
Nuestra Señora de las Gracias de Torcoroma	16 August 2011	Shrine of Our Lady of Graces of Torcoroma, Ocaña, Norte de Santander	Pope Benedict XVI (Note: Pope Benedict XVI, Congregation for Divine Worship and the Discipline of the Sacraments — Protocol Number: 339/10/L, Diocese of Ocaña, 30 April 2010. Vatican Apostolic Archive.)		

=== Costa Rica ===
Official title of the image	Date of coronation	Place of devotion	Authorization by	Marian image	Shrine of devotion
Virgen de los Ángeles	25 April 1926	Basilica of Our Lady of the Angels, Cartago	Pope Pius XI (Note: Pontifical decree of coronation granted on 20 October 1924 to the Bishop of San Jose de Costa Rica, Rafael Oton Castro y Jimenez. Notarized by the Secretary of Apostolic Dataria, Monsignor Domenico Jorio. Vatican Apostolic Archive.)		
La Virgen de la Pura y Limpia Concepción del Rescate de Ujarrás	27 April 1955	Santuario Nacional de Nuestra Señora de la Limpia Concepción del Rescate de Ujarrás, Paraíso	Pope Pius XII (Note: Pontifical decree of coronation granted on 23 October 1953 to Archbishop of Costa Rica, Ruben Odio y Herrera. The decree was notarized by the Secretary of Apostolic Dataria, Monsignor Marco Martini. The rite of coronation was executed by the Archbishop of Quito, Ecuador, Cardinal Carlos María de la Torre y Nieto as the Papal legate. Vatican Apostolic Archive.)		

=== Croatia ===
Official title of the image	Date of coronation	Place of devotion	Authorization by	Marian image	Shrine of devotion
Our Lady of Trsat	8 September 1715	Basilica of the Mother of God, Rijeka	Pope Clement XI		
Our Lady of Sinj	22 September 1716	Basilica of the Assumption, Sinj	Pope Clement XI		
Our Lady of the Stone Gate	31 May 1931	Chapel of Our Lady of the Stone Gate of Zagreb	Pope Pius XI		
Our Lady of Bistrica, Queen of Croatia	7 July 1935	Basilica and National Shrine of Our Lady of Bistrica, Marija Bistrica	Pope Pius XI		
Our Lady of Fátima	31 May 1959	Chapel of the Sisters of Our Lady, Zagreb	Pope Pius XII		

=== Cuba ===
Official title of the image	Date of coronation	Place of devotion	Authorization by	Marian image	Shrine of devotion
Our Lady of Charity	20 December 1936 24 January 1998	Basilica and National Shrine of Our Lady of Charity, El Cobre	Pope Pius XI Pope John Paul II		
Virgen de Regla	24 February 1956	National Shrine and Parish of Our Lady of the Rule, Havana	Pope Pius XII		

=== Czech Republic ===
Official title of the image	Date of coronation	Place of devotion	Authorization by	Marian image	Shrine of devotion
Panna Maria Svatohorská	22 June 1732	Svatá Hora, Příbram	Pope Clement XII		
Panna Maria Svatokopecká	21 September 1732 21 May 1995	Basilica of the Visitation of the Blessed Virgin Mary, Svatý Kopeček, Olomouc	Pope Clement XII Pope John Paul II		
Panna Maria Svatotomská	10 May 1736	Basilica of the Assumption of Our Lady, Brno	Pope Clement XII		
Panna Maria Svatohostýnská	15 August 1912	Basilica of the Assumption of Our Lady, Svatý Hostýn, Chvalčov	Pope Pius X		
Our Lady of Sorrows	13 September 1925	Basilica and Pilgrimage Church of Our Lady of Sorrows, Bohosudov (Mariaschein), Krupka	Pope Pius XI		
Staré Matky Boží, Divotvůrkyně Moravy	21 May 1995	Church of Saint Anne, Žarošice	Pope John Paul II		
Panny Marie Růžencové	7 October 2004	Parish of the Nativity of the Blessed Virgin Mary, Starý Bohumín	Pope John Paul II (Note: Pope John Paul II, Congregation for Divine Worship and the Discipline of the Sacraments — Protocol Number: 711/04/L, Diocese of Ostrava-Opava, 19 June 2004. Vatican Apostolic Archive.)		

=== Dominican Republic ===
Official title of the image	Date of coronation	Place of devotion	Authorization by	Marian image	Shrine of devotion
Nuestra Señora de la Altagracia	15 August 1922	Sanctuary of Saint Denis, Higüey (former location, before 1973) Cathedral Basilica and National Shrine of Our Lady of Altagracia, Higüey (current shrine)	Pope Pius XI		Former Present

=== Ecuador ===
Official title of the image	Date of coronation	Place of devotion	Authorization by	Marian image	Shrine of devotion
Virgen de la Merced	15 December 1918	Basilica of Our Lady of Mercy, Quito	Pope Benedict XV		
Virgen del Cisne	8 September 1930	Basilica and National Shrine of Our Lady of El Cisne	Pope Pius XI		
Virgen Morenica del Rosario	8 December 1933	Church of Saint Dominic, Cuenca	Pope Pius XI		
Nuestra Señora de la Presentación del Quinche	20 June 1943	Basilica and National Shrine of Our Lady of the Presentation, El Quinche	Pope Pius XII		
Virgen de la Merced	14 September 1947	Basilica of Our Lady of Mercy, Guayaquil	Pope Pius XII (Note: Pope Pius XII granted the pontifical decree of coronation of the image on 8 September 1947. Vatican Apostolic Archive.)		
Mary Help of Christians	8 December 1950	Parish of Mary Help of Christians, Cuenca	Pope Pius XII		
La Dolorosa del Colegio	22 April 1956	Capilla del Milagro de la Dolorosa del Colegio, Quito	Pope Pius XII		
Nuestra Señora de Agua Santa de Baños	13 December 1959	Parish of Our Lady of the Rosary of Holy Water, Baños de Agua Santa	Pope Pius XII		
Virgen de la Merced	13 February 1966	Church of Our Lady of Mercy, Latacunga	Pope Paul VI		
Virgin of the Clouds	1 January 1967	Iglesia de San Francisco, Azogues	Pope Paul VI		
Immaculate Heart of Mary	18 July 1979	Basílica del Voto Nacional, Quito	Pope Paul VI (Note: Sacra Congregatio pro Sacramentis et Cultu Divino: Prot. CD 743/78, Archdiocese of Quito, 21 June 1978. Vatican Apostolic Archive.)		
Nuestra Señora del Carmen	16 July 2002	Monasterio y Santuario Mariano del Carmen de la Asunción, Cuenca	Pope John Paul II (Note: Pope John Paul II, Congregation for Divine Worship and the Discipline of the Sacraments — Protocol Number: 1496/01/L, Archdiocese of Cuenca, 14 September 2001. Vatican Apostolic Archive.)		
Immaculate Heart of Mary	26 June 2018	Cathedral of Azogues	Pope Francis (Note: Pope Francis, Congregation for Divine Worship and the Discipline of the Sacraments — Protocol Number: 386/17, Diocese of Azogues, 25 May 2018. Vatican Apostolic Archive.)		
Nuestra Señora del Rocío	1 May 2022	Shrine of Our Lady of the Dew, Biblián, Cañar	Pope Francis (Note: Pope Francis, Congregation for Divine Worship and the Discipline of the Sacraments — Protocol Number: 229/19, Diocese of Azogues, 5 September 2019. Vatican Apostolic Archive.)		

=== El Salvador ===
Official title of the image	Date of coronation	Place of devotion	Authorization by	Marian image	Shrine of devotion
Nuestra Señora de la Paz	21 November 1921	Cathedral Basilica and National Shrine of the Queen of Peace, San Miguel	Pope Benedict XV		
Nuestra Señora del Santísimo Rosario	25 November 1942	Parish Church of Our Lady of the Rosary, San Salvador	Pope Pius XII		
Nuestra Señora de Guadalupe	12 December 1953	Basilica of Our Lady of Guadalupe, Antiguo Cuscatlán	Pope Pius XII		

=== France ===
Official title of the image	Date of coronation	Place of devotion	Authorization by	Marian image	Shrine of devotion
Our Lady of Victories	9 July 1853	Basilica of Our Lady of Victories, Paris	Pope Pius IX		
Notre-Dame de Rocamadour	8 September 1853	Sanctuary of Notre-Dame de Rocamadour	Pope Pius IX		
Notre-Dame des Miracles	13 May 1855	Basilica of Our Lady of Miracles, Mauriac	Pope Pius IX		
Our Lady of Laus	23 May 1855	Basilica of Our Lady of Laus, Saint-Étienne-le-Laus	Pope Pius IX		
Notre-Dame du Pilier	31 May 1855	Chartres Cathedral	Pope Pius IX		
Notre-Dame de Torcé-en-Vallée	2 July 1855	Church of Notre-Dame de Torcé-en-Vallée	Pope Pius IX		
Notre-Dame de Bon Secours de Fresneau	8 September 1855	Sanctuary of Our Lady of Fresneau, Marsanne	Pope Pius IX		
Vierge Noire du Puy-en-Velay	24 April 1856	Le Puy Cathedral	Pope Pius IX		
Notre-Dame, Consolatrice des Affliges	2 July 1856	Basilica of Notre-Dame de Verdelais	Pope Pius IX		
Notre-Dame de Liesse	18 August 1857	Basilica of Notre-Dame, Liesse-Notre-Dame	Pope Pius IX		
Notre-Dame de Bon Secours	8 September 1857	Basilica of Our Lady of Good Help, Guingamp	Pope Pius IX		
Notre-Dame de la Seds	8 December 1857	Church of Our Lady of the Seat, Aix-en-Provence	Pope Pius IX		center200px
Notre-Dame de Sainte Espérance	5 April 1858	Church of Saint-Séverin, Paris	Pope Pius IX		
Notre-Dame de Rumengol	30 May 1858	Church of Notre-Dame de Rumengol, Le Faou	Pope Pius IX		
Notre-Dame de Marienthal ("Pieta")	19 September 1859	Basilica of Notre-Dame de Marienthal, Haguenau	Pope Pius IX		
Notre-Dame des Aydes	20 May 1860	Church of Saint-Saturnin, Blois	Pope Pius IX		
Notre-Dame de Valfleury	31 May 1860	Sanctuary of Notre-Dame de Valfleury	Pope Pius IX		
Notre-Dame d'Avesnières	5 September 1860	Basilica of Notre-Dame d'Avesnières, Laval	Pope Pius IX		
Notre-Dame de Cléry	8 September 1863	Basilica of Our Lady of Cléry	Pope Pius IX (Note: Pontifical decree of coronation titled Universis Christi, granted to the Bishop of Orléans, Monsignor Félix Dupanloup, on 11 April 1862. The decree was signed by Cardinal Benedetto Barberini. Vatican Apostolic Archive.)		
Notre-Dame la Grande	29 November 1863	Church of Notre-Dame la Grande, Poitiers	Pope Pius IX		
Notre-Dame de Lumière	30 July 1864	Sanctuary of Our Lady of Light, Goult	Pope Pius IX		
Notre-Dame d'Espérance	30 July 1865	Basilica of Our Lady of Hope, Saint-Brieuc	Pope Pius IX		
Notre-Dame de Bonsecours	3 September 1865	Church of Notre-Dame de Bonsecours, Nancy	Pope Pius IX		
Notre-Dame de Buglose	9 September 1866	Basilica of Our Lady of Buglose, Saint-Vincent-de-Paul, Landes	Pope Pius IX		
Notre-Dame de Belpeuch	8 September 1868	Shrine of Our Lady of Belpeuch, Camps-Saint-Mathurin-Léobazel	Pope Pius IX		
Notre-Dame du Roncier	8 September 1868	Basilica of Our Lady of the Bramble, Josselin	Pope Pius IX (Note: Pontifical decree of coronation granted to the Bishop of Vannes, Jean Marie Becel on 31 March 1868. Vatican Apostolic Archive.)		
Sainte-Anne d'Auray	30 September 1868	Basilica of Sainte-Anne-d'Auray	Pope Pius IX (Note: Pontifical decree of coronation granted to the Bishop of Vannes, Jean Marie Becel on 22 May 1868. Vatican Apostolic Archive.)		
Notre-Dame de la Délivrande	8 December 1868	Church of Notre-Dame de la Délivrande, Le Morne-Rouge	Pope Pius IX		
Our Lady of the Sacred Heart	25 February 1869	Basilica of Our Lady of the Sacred Heart, Issoudun	Pope Pius IX		
Notre-Dame de Grâce	11 May 1869	Sanctuary of Our Lady of Grace, Rochefort-du-Gard	Pope Pius IX (Note: Pontifical decree of coronation granted to the Bishop of Nimes, François-Nicolas-Xavier-Louis Besson on 27 April 1869. Sacred Congregation of Rites.)		
Notre-Dame de Pradelles	18 July 1869	Chapel of Notre-Dame de Pradelles	Pope Pius IX		
Notre-Dame du Bon Remède	15 October 1869	Frigolet Abbey, Tarascon	Pope Pius IX (Note: Pontifical decree of coronation granted to the Bishop of Puy, Pierre le Breton signed and notarized in the Vatican on 31 August 1869. Vatican Apostolic Archive.)		
Notre-Dame de Mont-Roland	2 August 1872	Sanctuary of Notre-Dame de Mont-Roland, Jouhe	Pope Pius IX		
Notre-Dame de la Délivrande	22 August 1872	Basilica of Notre-Dame de la Délivrande, Douvres-la-Délivrande	Pope Pius IX		
Notre-Dame d'Arcachon	16 July 1873	Basilica of Notre-Dame d'Arcachon	Pope Pius IX (Note: Pontifical decree of coronation granted on 15 July 1870. Vatican Apostolic Archive.)		
Notre-Dame de Sion	10 September 1873	Basilica of Notre-Dame de Sion, Saxon-Sion	Pope Pius IX (Note: Pontifical decree of coronation granted to the Archbishop of Besancon, Cardinal Jacques-Marie-Adrien-Césaire Mathieu. Vatican Apostolic Archive.)		
Notre-Dame de Pitié	21 September 1873	Basilica of Our Lady of Piety, La Chapelle-Saint-Laurent	Pope Pius IX		
Vierge Noire de Toulouse	31 May 1874	Basilique Notre-Dame de la Daurade, Toulouse	Pope Pius IX		
Notre-Dame de la Treille	21 June 1874	Lille Cathedral	Pope Pius IX (Note: Pontifical decree of coronation granted to Archbishop of Cambrai, Cardinal René-François Régnier on 15 June 1874. Vatican Apostolic Archive.)		
Notre-Dame du Port	20 June 1875	Basilica of Notre-Dame du Port, Clermont-Ferrand	Pope Pius IX		
Notre-Dame des Miracles	18 July 1875	Saint-Omer Cathedral	Pope Pius IX		
Notre-Dame de la Carce	15 August 1875	Church of Norte-Dame de la Carce, Marvejols	Pope Pius IX (Note: Pontifical decree of coronation granted to the parish priest of Marvejols, Father Eugene Roussel on 4 December 1874. The rite of coronation was executed by the Bishop of Mende, Joseph Frederick Saivet. Vatican Apostolic Archive.)		
Notre Dame des Gardes	8 September 1875	Abbey of Our Lady of the Guards, Saint-Georges-des-Gardes	Pope Pius IX		
Notre-Dame de Benoite-Vaux	8 September 1875	Church of Norte-Dame de Benoite-Vaux, Rambluzin-et-Benoite-Vaux	Pope Pius IX (Note: Pontifical decree of coronation granted to Monsignor Augustin Hacquard on 16 August 1875. Signed and notarized by Cardinal Fabio Maria Asquini. Vatican Apostolic Archive.)		
Our Lady of the Holy Rosary (Note: The title of the Virgin Mary in her apparition to Soubirous Bernadette as Our Lady of the Immaculate Conception. Public devotion of the cult used officially used the Marian title Our Lady of the Rosary due to the description that she was holding a Brigittine rosary. Years of cult devotion translated her image into its local place of devotion, now known as Our Lady of Lourdes.)	3 July 1876	Sanctuary of Our Lady of Lourdes	Pope Pius IX (Note: Pontifical decree of coronation signed and granted on 1 February 1876 by Pope Pius IX, notarized at the Vatican on the next day. The image was then crowned by Archbishop of Damascus, Pier Francesco Meglia on 3 July the same year. Vatican Apostolic Archive.)		
Notre-Dame de Ceignac	9 July 1876	Basilica of Notre-Dame de Ceignac, Calmont	Pope Pius IX		
Sainte-Anne d'Apt	9 September 1877	Apt Cathedral	Pope Pius IX (Note: Pontifical decree of coronation granted to the Archbishop of Avignon, Monsigneur Louis Dubreil. White marble statue purchased from the workshop of Giovanni Maria Benzoni after his death. Vatican Apostolic Archive.)		
Notre-Dame des Oliviers	18 June 1878	Church of Our Lady of Olives, Murat	Pope Leo XIII (Note: Pontifical decree signed on 10 May 1878. Notarized by Camerlengo of the Holy Roman Church, Cardinal Fabio Maria Asquini.)		
Our Lady of La Salette	21 August 1879	Sanctuary of Our Lady of La Salette, La Salette-Fallavaux	Pope Leo XIII		
Notre-Dame de Bonsecours	24 May 1880	Basilica of Notre-Dame de Bonsecours	Pope Pius IX (Note: Pontifical decree of coronation granted on 15 July 1870 by Pope Pius IX. The image was crowned through a grand public ceremony by Cardinal Henri de Bonnechose on 24 May 1880 at the time of Pope Leo XIII's pontificate.)		
Notre-Dame de Bon Secours	15 August 1880	Basilica of Our Lady of Good Help, Lablachère	Pope Leo XIII		
Notre-Dame de Vassivière	3 July 1881	Chapel of Notre-Dame de Vassivière, Besse-et-Saint-Anastaise	Pope Leo XIII		
Notre-Dame de Toutes Aides	24 June 1883	Church of Our Lady of All Helps, Nantes	Pope Leo XIII		
Notre-Dame du Grand Retour	25 August 1885	Basilica of Notre-Dame, Boulogne	Pope Leo XIII		
Notre-Dame des Tables	20 March 1888	Basilique Notre-Dame des Tables de Montpellier, Montpellier	Pope Leo XIII		
Notre-Dame du Folgoët	8 September 1888	Basilica of Notre-Dame du Folgoët, Le Folgoët	Pope Leo XIII		
Notre-Dame de l'Épine	3 June 1890	Basilica of Notre-Dame de l'Épine, L'Épine, Marne	Pope Leo XIII		
Notre-Dame d'Arliquet	25 September 1892	Chapel of Our Lady of Arliquet, Aixe-sur-Vienne	Pope Leo XIII		
Notre-Dame de Sarrance	26 July 1893	Church of Notre-Dame-de-la-Pierre, Sarrance	Pope Leo XIII (Note: Pontifical decree of coronation signed on 21 June 1892. Notarized by the Dean of the College of Cardinals, Serafino Vannutelli.)		
Notre-Dame d'Orcival	3 May 1894	Basilica of Our Lady of Orcival	Pope Leo XIII	center200px	
Notre-Dame de Grâce	14 May 1894	Cambrai Cathedral	Pope Leo XIII		
Vierge Noire de Mende	15 August 1894	Mende Cathedral	Pope Leo XIII (Note: Pontifical decree of coronation granted to the Bishop of Mende, Francois Narcisse du Baptifolier on 18 December 1893. Signed and notarized by Cardinal Luigi Macchi. Vatican Apostolic Archive.)		
Notre-Dame des Portes	26 August 1894	Chapel of Our Lady of the Doors, Châteauneuf-du-Faou	Pope Leo XIII		
Notre-Dame du Saint Cordon	7 June 1897	Basilica of Our Lady of the Holy Cord, Valenciennes	Pope Leo XIII		
Our Lady of the Miraculous Medal	26 July 1897	Chapel of Our Lady of the Miraculous Medal, Rue du Bac, Paris	Pope Leo XIII		
Notre-Dame de Romay	5 August 1897	Chapel of Notre-Dame de Romay, Paray-le-Monial	Pope Leo XIII		
Notre-Dame de Bethléem	6 September 1898	Ferrières Abbey	Pope Leo XIII		
Notre-Dame de Laghet	19 April 1900	Sanctuary of Our Lady of Laghet, Nice	Pope Leo XIII (Note: Pontifical decree of coronation granted by Pope Leo XIII to the former Archbishop of Bordeaux, Cardinal Victor-Lucien-Sulpice Lécot on 29 September 1898. The rite of coronation was executed the former Archbishop of Nice, Henri Louis Chapon. Vatican Apostolic Archive.)		
Notre-Dame de Rostrenen	2 July 1900	Église Notre-Dame du Roncier, Rostrenen	Pope Leo XIII		
Notre-Dame de Fourvière	8 September 1900	Basilica of Notre-Dame de Fourvière, Lyon	Pope Leo XIII		
Notre-Dame de Brebières	19 June 1901	Basilica of Our Lady of Brebières, Albert	Pope Leo XIII		
Notre-Dame de Foncourrieu	30 June 1901	Chapel of Our Lady of the Running Fountain, Marcillac-Vallon	Pope Leo XIII		
Notre-Dame des Dunes	10 June 1903	Chapel of Our Lady of the Dunes, Dunkirk	Pope Leo XIII		
Notre-Dame de Quézac	11 September 1904	Church of Notre-Dame de Quézac	Pope Pius IX		
Notre-Dame des Malades	11 December 1904	Church of Saint-Joseph-Artisan, Paris	Pope Pius X		
Notre-Dame de Myans	17 August 1905	Sanctuary of Notre-Dame de Myans	Pope Pius X		
Notre-Dame de la Paix	9 July 1906	Chapel of Our Lady of Peace of Picpus, Paris	Pope Pius X		
Notre-Dame des Miracles et Vertus	25 March 1908	Basilica of Saint Sauveur, Rennes	Pope Pius X		
Notre-Dame de Bonne Nouvelle	25 March 1908	Basilica of Our Lady of Good News, Rennes	Pope Pius X		
Notre-Dame de Mont-Roland (original statue)	31 August 1908	Church of Saint Peter, Jouhe	Pope Pius X		
Notre-Dame du Chêne	6 October 1908	Basilica and Diocesan Shrine of Our Lady of the Oak, Vion, Sarthe	Pope Pius X		
Notre-Dame de Gray	16 May 1909	Basilica of Notre-Dame de Gray	Pope Pius X		
Notre-Dame de Consolation	21 June 1909	Chapel of Our Lady of Consolation, Hyères	Pope Pius X		
Notre-Dame de la Visitation	16 May 1910	Église Saint Wandrille, Bollezeele	Pope Pius X		
Notre Dame de Laurie	27 May 1912	Church of Notre-Dame de Laurie	Pope Pius X		
Notre-Dame d'Étang	4 July 1912	Chapel of Our Lady of the Pond, Velars-sur-Ouche	Pope Pius X		
Notre-Dame du Beau Rameau	12 July 1912	Sanctuary of Notre-Dame de Betharram	Pope Pius X (Note: Pontifical decree of coronation titled Dies non longe abest, signed on 14 June 1912. Vatican Apostolic Archive.)		
Notre-Dame de Grâce	19 June 1913	Chapel of Our Lady of Grace, Honfleur	Pope Pius X (Note: Pontifical decree of coronation granted on 15 February 1912 to Bishop of Bayeux, Thomas Lemmonier. Vatican Apostolic Archive.)		
Notre-Dame-Trouvée	6 July 1913	Chapelle Notre-Dame-Trouvée, Pouilly-en-Auxois	Pope Pius X		
Notre-Dame du Peyrou	24 July 1913	Chapel of Notre-Dame de Peyrou, Clermont-l'Hérault	Pope Pius X		
Sainte-Anne la Palud	31 August 1913	Chapel of Sainte-Anne la Palud, Plonévez-Porzay	Pope Pius X (Note: Pontifical decree of coronation granted to the Bishop of Quimper, Adolph Duparc on 7 February 1913. The ceremony of coronation was executed on 31 August 1913. Vatican Apostolic Archive.)		
Notre-Dame d'Estours	7 September 1913	Chapelle Notre-Dame d'Estours, Monistrol-d'Allier	Pope Pius X		
Notre-Dame du Guet	4 July 1920	Collégiale Saint-Étienne, Bar-le-Duc	Pope Benedict XV		
Notre-Dame de Quelven	15 August 1921	Chapelle Notre-Dame-de-Quelven, Guern	Pope Pius X		
Notre-Dame d'Auteyrac	28 August 1921	Chapel of Notre-Dame, Vissac-Auteyrac	Pope Benedict XV		
Notre-Dame des Ardents	27 May 1923	Church of Our Lady of the Ardent, Arras	Pope Pius XI		
Notre-Dame des Enfants	26 August 1923	Basilica of Notre-Dame des Enfants, Châteauneuf-sur-Cher	Pope Pius XI		
Notre-Dame des Marais	8 September 1923	Church of Saint-Sulpice, Fougères	Pope Pius XI		
Notre-Dame de Béhuard	24 September 1923	Church of Notre-Dame de Béhuard	Pope Pius XI		
Notre-Dame de Font-Romeu	4 August 1926	Hermitage of Notre-Dame, Font-Romeu-Odeillo-Via	Pope Pius XI		
Notre-Dame de La Peinière	8 September 1926	Sanctuary of Our Lady of La Peinière, Saint-Didier, Ille-et-Vilaine	Pope Pius XI		
Notre-Dame d'Auch	21 May 1929	Auch Cathedral	Pope Pius XI		
Notre-Dame de la Garde	21 June 1931	Basilica of Our Lady of the Guard, Marseille	Pope Pius XI		
Notre-Dame d'Espérance	3 April 1932	Church of Our Lady of Hope, Cannes	Pope Pius XI		
Notre-Dame de Lescure	17 March 1934	Church of Our Lady of the Visitation, Valuéjols	Pope Pius XI		
Notre-Dame d'Obézine	4 July 1934	Église Notre-Dame d'Obézine, Angoulême	Pope Pius XI		
Notre-Dame d'Avioth	15 July 1934	Basilica of Notre-Dame d'Avioth	Pope Pius XI		
Our Lady of Hope	24 July 1934	Basilica of Notre-Dame de Pontmain	Pope Pius XI		
Notre-Dame de Délivrance	29 July 1934	Basilica of Notre-Dame de Délivrance, Quintin	Pope Pius XI (Note: Pontifical decree of coronation titled Uti ad nos Attulisti granted to the Bishop of Brieuc, Francois Marie Serrand, notarized by the Secretary of the Sacred Congregation of Rites and Cardinal Eugenio Pacelli. Vatican Apostolic Archive.)		
Notre-Dame du Suc	10 June 1935	Basilica of Notre-Dame du Suc, Brissac	Pope Pius XI		
Notre-Dame de Thierenbach	22 July 1935	Basilica of Our Lady of Thierenbach	Pope Pius XI		
Notre-Dame de Montligeon	19 September 1935	Basilica of Notre-Dame de Montligeon, La Chapelle-Montligeon	Pope Pius XI (Note: Pontifical decree of coronation granted on 8 August 1935 to the Archbishop of Paris, Cardinal Jean Verdier. Signed and notarized by Vatican Secretary of State, Cardinal Eugenio Pacelli. Vatican Apostolic Archive.)		
Notre-Dame des Malades	27 May 1937	Church of Saint Blaise, Vichy	Pope Pius XI		
Notre-Dame de La Guerche	17 June 1937	Basilica of Our Lady of the Assumption, La Guerche-de-Bretagne	Pope Pius XI		
Notre-Dame de Grâces	7 August 1938	Church of Our Lady of Graces, Cotignac	Pope Pius XI		
Notre-Dame de l'Aumône	2 June 1946	Chapelle Notre-Dane de l'Aumône, Rumilly, Haute-Savoie	Pope Pius XI		
Notre-Dame de Verdun	2 July 1946	Verdun Cathedral	Pope Pius XII (Note: Pontifical decree of coronation titled Mirabile itedemque granted to Cardinal Angelo Giuseppe Roncalli, Papal Nuncio to the country via a special mandate, "De Speciali Mandatum Sanctissimi" both signed and redeclared by the Grand Chancellor of Apostolic Briefs, Monsigneur Domenico Spada on 8 September 1947 in honor of the birthday of the Blessed Virgin Mary. Vatican Apostolic Archive.)		
Our Lady of Guadalupe	26 April 1949	Cathedral of Notre-Dame, Paris	Pope Pius XII (Note: Pontifical decree of 4 March 1949 granted to the Archbishop of Paris, Cardinal Emmanuel Célestin Suhard who executed the coronation rite. Vatican Apostolic Archive.)		
Notre-Dame de Toute Aide de Querrien	14 August 1950	Chapel of Our Lady of All Help, La Prénessaye	Pope Pius XII		
Notre-Dame de Joie	23 September 1951	Basilica of Our Lady of Joy, Pontivy	Pope Pius XII		
Notre-Dame des Grâces de Lavasina	18 May 1952	Sanctuary of Our Lady of Graces, Brando	Pope Pius XII		
Notre-Dame des Pénitents	21 June 1953	Chapelle des Pénitents, Yssingeaux	Pope Pius XII		
Notre-Dame Panetière	8 August 1954	Collegiate Church of Saint Peter, Aire-sur-la-Lys	Pope Pius XII		
Notre-Dame de L'Étoile	1 May 1960	Abbey of Our Lady of the Star, Montebourg	Pope John XXIII		
Notre-Dame du Puy	4 May 1964	Chapelle de Notre-Dame du Puy, Bourganeuf	Pope Paul VI		
Notre-Dame de Fatima des motards	15 August 2012	Oratory of the Madonna of the Bikers, Porcaro	Pope Benedict XVI		

=== Germany ===
Official title of the image	Date of coronation	Place of devotion	Authorization by	Marian image	Shrine of devotion
Our Lady, Comforter of the Afflicted	1 June 1892	Chapel of Mercy, Basilica of Our Lady of Kevelaer	Pope Leo XIII (Note: Pontifical decree of coronation granted on 20 July 1890. Redeclared by Pope Pius XI via In Civitate Appellata which raised her sanctuary to the status of Basilica on 23 April 1923. The decree was signed by Vatican Secretary of State, Cardinal Pietro Gasparri. Vatican Apostolic Archive.)		
Our Lady of Sorrows	3 July 1904	Pilgrimage Chapel of Telgte	Pope Pius X		
Immaculate Conception	11 September 1904	Maria, Königin des Friedens, Neviges, Velbert	Pope Pius X		
Our Lady of Sorrows	12 September 1909	Monastery of Marienthal	Pope Pius X (Note: The pontifical decree of coronation was granted by Pope Pius X in 1908.)		
Our Lady of Grace (Gnadenbild)	13 August 1911	Basilica of the Visitation of Our Lady, Werl	Pope Pius X		
Our Lady, Comforter of the Afflicted	17 August 1913	Parish Church of Saint Bartholomew, Verne, Salzkotten	Pope Pius X		
Our Lady of Sorrows	10 May 1925	Marian Pilgrimage Church, Bornhofen Monastery, Kamp-Bornhofen	Pope Pius XI		
Saint Mary of the Copper Valley	7 June 1925	St. Maria in der Kupfergasse, Cologne	Pope Pius XI		
Mary Help of Christians (Gnadenbild)	4 September 1927	Aachen Cathedral	Pope Pius XI (Note: Pope Pius XI granted the pontifical decree of coronation on 8 May 1927. Vatican Apostolic Archive.)		
Our Lady of the Linden Tree	8 September 1928	Pilgrimage Church of Rosenthal	Pope Pius XI		
Mary Help of Christians	8 August 1979	Kreuzberg Church, Schwandorf	Pope John Paul II (Note: Sacra Congregatio pro Sacramentis et Cultu Divino: Prot. CD 814/79, Diocese of Regensburg, 19 July 1979. Vatican Apostolic Archive.)		

=== Guatemala ===
Official title of the image	Date of coronation	Place of devotion	Authorization by	Marian image	Shrine of devotion
Nuestra Señora del Santísimo Rosario	28 January 1934	Basilica and National Shrine of Our Lady of the Rosary, Church of Saint Dominic, Guatemala City	Pope Pius XI		
Inmaculada Concepción, Virgen de los Reyes	5 December 1954	Iglesia de San Francisco, Guatemala City	Pope Pius XII		
Nuestra Señora del Santísimo Rosario	7 March 1983	Quetzaltenango Cathedral	Pope John Paul II		
Nuestra Señora de la Asunción	6 February 1996	Parish of Our Lady of the Assumption, Guatemala City	Pope John Paul II		
Virgen Metropolitana de la Inmaculada Concepción	5 December 2004	Cathedral of Guatemala City	Pope John Paul II (Note: Pope John Paul II, Congregation for Divine Worship and the Discipline of the Sacraments — Protocol Number: 139/03/L, Archdiocese of Guatemala, 28 October 2003. Vatican Apostolic Archive.)		
Nuestra Señora de la Inmaculada Concepción	8 December 2004	Cathedral of Escuintla	Pope John Paul II (Note: Pope John Paul II, Congregation for Divine Worship and the Discipline of the Sacraments — Protocol Number: 1830/04/L, Diocese of Escuintla, 28 October 2004. Vatican Apostolic Archive.)		

=== India ===
Official title of the image	Date of coronation	Place of devotion	Authorization by	Marian image	Shrine of devotion
Our Lady of Lourdes	8 May 1886	Our Lady of Lourdes Shrine, Villianur, Pondicherry	Pope Leo XIII (Note: Pontifical decree of coronation granted to the Archbishop of Pondicherry, François-Jean-Marie Laouënan on 21 February 1886.)		
Our Lady of the Mount	5 December 1954	Basilica of Our Lady of the Mount, Bandra, Mumbai	Pope Pius XII (Note: Pontifical decree of coronation granted on 21 October 1954 by Pope Pius XII, as a "special mandate" (De Speciali Mandatum Sanctissimi) or Motu Proprio, both signed and notarized by Cardinal Giovanni Battista Montini. Vatican Apostolic Archive.)		

=== Ireland ===
Official title of the image	Date of coronation	Place of devotion	Authorization by	Marian image	Shrine of devotion
Our Lady of Knock	18 December 1954	Basilica and International Shrine of Our Lady of Knock	Pope Pius XII		

=== Japan ===
Official title of the image	Date of coronation	Place of devotion	Authorization by	Marian image	Shrine of devotion
Our Lady of Guadalupe	Decreed on 10 December 1980	Chapel of the Convent of the Poor Clare Missionaries of the Blessed Sacrament, Setagaya, Tokyo	Pope John Paul II (Note: Sacra Congregatio pro Sacramentis et Cultu Divino: Prot. CD 1658/80, Archdiocese of Tokyo, 10 December 1980. Vatican Apostolic Archive.)		

=== Kuwait ===
Official title of the image	Date of coronation	Place of devotion	Authorization by	Marian image	Shrine of devotion
Our Lady of Arabia	25 March 1960	Minor Basilica of Our Lady of Arabia, Ahmadi	Pope John XXIII (Note: Decree of coronation granted to the Apostolic Vicar of Kuwait, Ubaldo Teofano y Stella, signed by the Vatican Secretary of State, Cardinal Domenico Tardini. Notarized by Grand Chancellor of Apostolic Briefs, Monsignor Gildo Brugnola — Prænotanda Numerorum # 29031. Vatican Apostolic Archive.)		

=== Lithuania ===
Official title of the image	Date of coronation	Place of devotion	Authorization by	Marian image	Shrine of devotion
Our Lady of Trakai	4 September 1718	Basilica of the Visitation of the Blessed Virgin Mary, Trakai	Pope Clement XI		
Our Lady of Sapieha	8 September 1750	Vilnius Cathedral	Pope Benedict XIV		
Our Lady of Šiluva	8 September 1786	Basilica of the Nativity of the Blessed Virgin Mary, Šiluva	Pope Pius VI		
Our Lady of the Gate of Dawn	5 July 1927	Chapel of the Gate of Dawn, Vilnius	Pope Pius XI		
Mother of God of Pivašiūnai	14 August 1988	Church of the Assumption of the Blessed Virgin Mary, Pivašiūnai	Pope John Paul II		
Our Lady, Queen of Christian Families	8 October 2006	Basilica of the Visitation of the Blessed Virgin Mary, Žemaičių Kalvarija	Pope Benedict XVI (Note: Pope Benedict XVI, Congregation for Divine Worship and the Discipline of the Sacraments — Protocol Number: 649/06/L, Diocese of Telšiai, 31 May 2006. Vatican Apostolic Archive.)		
Our Lady, Mother of Hope	15 August 2025	Basilica of the Assumption, Krekenava	Pope Francis (Note: Pope Francis, Dicastery for Divine Worship and the Discipline of the Sacraments — Protocol Number: 62/25, Diocese of Panevėžys, 17 February 2025. Vatican Apostolic Archive.)		

=== Luxembourg ===
Official title of the image	Date of coronation	Place of devotion	Authorization by	Marian image	Shrine of devotion
Our Lady of Luxembourg	2 July 1866	Notre-Dame Cathedral, Luxembourg	Pope Pius IX		
Notre Dame des Mineurs	26 July 1953	Kayl	Pope Pius XII		

=== Malta ===
Official title of the image	Date of coronation	Place of devotion	Authorization by	Marian image	Shrine of devotion
Our Lady of Mount Carmel	15 July 1881	Basilica of Our Lady of Mount Carmel, Valletta	Pope Leo XIII (Note: Pontifical decree of coronation granted to the nobility of Malta on 19 June 1880, for the 'graces offered to the Virgin of Mount Carmel bestowed by the Majesty of the Bishop of Rome through the Vatican Chapter'. Vatican Apostolic Archive.)		
Madonna of Saint Luke	26 June 1898	St Paul's Cathedral, Mdina	Pope Leo XIII		
Madonna tal-Mellieħa	24 September 1899	Sanctuary of Our Lady of Mellieħa	Pope Leo XIII		
Immaculate Conception of Cospicua (painting)	25 June 1905	Collegiate Parish Church of the Immaculate Conception, Cospicua	Pope Pius X (Note: Pontifical decree of coronation granted to Cardinal Domenico Ferrata on 25 January 1905. The coronation was for the honor of Maltese people at the end of the event. Cardinal Federico Tedeschini added a set of twelve silver stars to the image on 25 June 1955, commemorating its fiftieth anniversary. — Sacred Congregation of Rites.)		
Madonna tal-Ħerba	7 August 1910	Sanctuary of Our Lady of Tal-Ħerba, Birkirkara	Pope Pius X (Note: Pontifical decree of coronation granted on 13 February 1910 signed via Cardinal Mariano Rampolla y Tindaro, and notarized by Cardinal Angelo di Pietro. The rite of coronation was executed by Archbishop of Rhodes, Pietro Pace. Vatican Apostolic Archive.)		
La Marija Bambina	4 September 1921	Basilica of the Nativity of Mary, Senglea	Pope Benedict XV (Note: Pontifical decree of coronation Capitulo Nostro granted to Archbishop Maurus Caruana on 25 April 1920 due to the veneration of the image since the year 1618. Signed by the Secretary deacon of the Vatican Chapter, Monsignor Giulio Malvezzi and notarized by Grand Chancellor of the Vatican Chapter, Monsignor Giuseppe Cascioli. — Sacred Congregation of Rites.)		
Blessed Virgin of Ta' Pinu of Assumption	20 June 1935	Basilica and National Shrine of the Madonna of Ta' Pinu	Pope Pius XI (Note: Pontifical decree of coronation titled Marianum Exstat Sanctuarium granted on 24 May 1935 to the Archbishop of Tarsus, Cardinal Alexis Lépicier. — Sacred Congregation of Rites.)		
Our Lady of Health	4 April 1948	Church of Saint Francis, Rabat	Pope Pius XII (Note: Pontifical decree of coronation granted on 3 February 1948 to the Archbishop of Malta, Mikiel Gonzi. Notarized by the Regent of the Apostolic Dataria, Marco Martini. Vatican Apostolic Archive.)		
Virgin of Graces	2 September 1951	Parish Church of Our Lady of Graces, Żabbar	Pope Pius XII (Note: Pontifical decree granted on 20 July 1949 to Archbishop Mikiel Gonzi. Notarized by the Regent of the Apostolic Dataria, Marco Martini. Vatican Apostolic Archive.)		
Virgin of Divine Graces	27 January 1952	Church of Our Lady of Divine Grace, Victoria, Gozo	Pope Pius XII		
Immaculate Conception (painting)	1 August 1954	Chapel of the Immaculate Conception, Qala	Pope Pius XII (Note: The pontifical decree of coronation was granted by Pope Pius XII on 21 February 1954. Vatican Apostolic Archive.)		
Madonna ta' Caraffa	7 November 1954	St John's Co-Cathedral, Valletta	Pope Pius XII (Note: Pontifical decree of coronation granted through the Vatican Chapter to His Excellency, Most Reverend Mikiel Gonzi, Archbishop of Malta, on 31 December 1953. Vatican Apostolic Archive.)		
Madonna tal-Għar	2 June 1957	Chapel of Our Lady of the Grotto within the Dominican Convent, Rabat	Pope Pius XII		
Our Lady of the Assumption (painting)	10 August 1975	Rotunda of Mosta	Pope Paul VI (Note: Sacra Congregatio pro Sacramentis et Cultu Divino: Prot. n. 1907/73, Archdiocese of Malta, 12 December 1973. Vatican Apostolic Archive.)		
Our Lady of the Assumption (painting)	15 August 1975	Cathedral of the Assumption, Victoria	Pope Paul VI (Note: Sacra Congregatio pro Sacramentis et Cultu Divino: Prot. n. 2477/74, Diocese of Gozo, 8 February 1975. Vatican Apostolic Archive.)		

=== Mexico ===
Official title of the image	Date of coronation	Place of devotion	Authorization by	Marian image	Shrine of devotion
Virgen de la Esperanza	14 February 1886	Sanctuary of Our Lady of Hope, Jacona, Michoacan	Pope Leo XIII (Note: Pontifical decree of coronation granted to Monsignor Jose Antonio Plancarte y Labastida, a cousin of the former Archbishop of Mexico, Pelagio Antonio de Labastida y Dávalos on 7 December 1885, who executed the rite of coronation. The original Marian title Virgen de Raiz was suppressed due to questionable Pagan origins, having been replaced by Virgen de Esperanza, in addition to the original Child Jesus was also permanently removed as condition for imprimatur.)		
Our Lady of Guadalupe	17 July 1740 (Note: The date when Pope Benedict XIV initially authorized the coronation of the image. It did not take place due to ongoing political conflict at that time.) 12 October 1895	Old Basilica of Our Lady of Guadalupe, Templo Expiatorio a Cristo Rey (former shrine) Insigne y Nacional Basílica de Santa María de Guadalupe, Mexico City (current shrine since 1976)	Pope Benedict XIV Pope Leo XIII (Note: The Vatican Chapter began its initial investigations on alleged miracles in 1740 and was delayed due to ongoing political conflict. The Pontifical decree of coronation Mexicus Heic Populus was granted on 8 February 1887 for the Archbishop of Mexico, Próspero Alarcón y Sánchez de la Barquera but the decree was initially withheld. The Sacred Congregation of Rites re—opened the case again in 1894 and finally approved a set of Divine Office under this Marian title. The rite of coronation executed in 1895 was assisted by the Archbishop of Michoacán, Jose Ignacio Arciga Ruiz de Chavez. Vatican Apostolic Archive.)		Former Present
Nuestra Señora de la Salud	5 April 1898	Basilica of Our Lady of Health, Pátzcuaro	Pope Leo XIII		
Nuestra Señora de la Luz	8 October 1902	Cathedral of León, Guanajuato	Pope Leo XIII (Note: Pontifical decree of coronation granted to Archbishop Leopoldo Ruiz y Flóres, signed on 20 March 1901. Vatican Apostolic Archive.)		
Nuestra Señora de San Juan de los Lagos	15 August 1904	Cathedral Basilica of San Juan de los Lagos	Pope Pius X (Note: Pontifical decree of coronation granted to Archbishop of Guadalajara, Jose de Jesus Ortiz y Rodriguez on 29 January 1904. Vatican Apostolic Archive.)		
Nuestra Señora de Guanajuato	31 May 1908	Collegiate Basilica of Guanajuato City	Pope Pius X		
Nuestra Señora de la Soledad	18 January 1909	Basilica of Nuestra Señora de Soledad, Oaxaca	Pope Pius X		
Virgen de Ocotlán	31 July 1909	Basilica of Our Lady of Ocotlán	Pope Pius X		
Purísima Concepción	12 October 1909	Celaya Cathedral	Pope Pius X		
Nuestra Señora de Zapopan	18 January 1921	Basilica of Our Lady of Zapopan	Pope Benedict XV		
Virgen de la Soledad	30 April 1922	Diocesan Shrine of Our Lady of Solitude, Irapuato	Pope Benedict XV		
Nuestra Señora del Rosario	12 May 1923	Basilica of Our Lady of the Rosary, Talpa de Allende	Pope Benedict XV		
Nuestra Señora de los Angeles	23 October 1923	Shrine Parish of Our Lady of the Angels, Mexico City	Pope Pius XI		
Nuestra Señora de los Dolores	15 September 1924	Sanctuary of Our Lady of Sorrows, Acatzingo	Pope Pius XI		
Nuestra Señora de la Luz	24 May 1939	Shrine Parish of Our Lady of Light, Salvatierra	Pope Pius XI		
Nuestra Señora del Rayo	18 August 1941	Templo de Jesús María, Guadalajara	Pope Pius XI		
Nuestra Señora del Carmen	16 October 1942	Sanctuary of Our Lady of Mount Carmel, Tlalpujahua	Pope Pius XII		
Nuestra Señora de la Soledad de Parral	22 October 1943	Church of Our Lady of Solitude, Parral, Chihuahua	Pope Pius XII (Note: Pontifical decree of coronation signed and executed by Cardinal Luigi Maglione on 17 July 1943. Vatican Apostolic Archive.)		
Nuestra Señora de los Remedios	21 November 1945	Sanctuary of Our Lady of Remedies, Zitácuaro	Pope Pius XII		
Our Lady of Guadalupe	12 October 1946	Parish of Our Lady of Guadalupe, Romita	Pope Pius XII (Note: The pontifical decree of coronation was formally granted by Pope Pius XII on 25 March 1946. Vatican Apostolic Archive.)		
Nuestra Señora del Pueblito	17 October 1946	Basílica Santuario de Nuestra Señora del Pueblito, El Pueblito, Querétaro	Pope Pius XII (Note: Decree of coronation granted on 7 October 1943. Vatican Secret Archives.)		
Virgen del Sagrario	2 February 1947	Diocesan Shrine of Our Lady of the Tabernacle, Church of Saint Francis, Tamazula de Gordiano	Pope Pius XII (Note: Pontifical decree of coronation signed and granted to Archbishop of Guadalajara, Juan de Jesus Posadas y Ocampo on 14 November 1945. — Vatican Apostolic Archive)		
Nuestra Señora de la Soledad	15 November 1947	Parish of Our Lady of Solitude, Ayotlán	Pope Pius XII		
Nuestra Señora del Carmen	24 November 1947	Sanctuary of Our Lady of Mount Carmel, Teziutlán	Pope Pius XII		
La Inmaculada Concepción	3 December 1947	Conciliar Seminary of Mexico City	Pope Pius XII		
Nuestra Señora de la Asunción	15 August 1948	Parish of Our Lady of the Assumption, Jalostotitlan	Pope Pius XII		
Nuestra Señora del Sagrado Corazón	26 September 1948	Basilica of Saint Joseph and Our Lady of the Sacred Heart, Mexico City	Pope Pius XII		
Nuestra Señora de Izamal	22 August 1949	Convent of Saint Anthony, Izamal	Pope Pius XII		
Virgen del Rosario	19 November 1950	Parish of Our Lady of the Rosary, Poncitlán	Pope Pius XII		
Virgen del Carmen de San Ángel	20 July 1951	Archdiocesan Shrine of Our Lady of Mount Carmel of San Ángel, Mexico City	Pope Pius XII		
Virgen del Rosario	20 August 1951	Parish of Saint Francis of Assisi, Charcas	Pope Pius XII		
Nuestra Señora del Carmen	24 November 1951	Church of Our Lady of Mount Carmel, Celaya	Pope Pius XII (Note: Pontifical decree of coronation signed and granted on 23 July 1950. — Vatican Apostolic Archive)		
Nuestra Señora del Pueblito	18 January 1953	Parish of Our Lady of Pueblito, San Juanito de Escobedo	Pope Pius XII (Note: Pontifical decree of coronation granted to the Archbishop of Guadalajara, José Garibi y Rivera on 11 January 1952. Vatican Apostolic Archive.)		
Our Lady of Fatima	18 January 1953	Campeche Cathedral	Pope Pius XII		
Nuestra Señora del Sagrario	15 August 1953	Church of Our Lady of the Tabernacle, Santa Clara del Cobre	Pope Pius XII (Note: Pontifical decree of coronation titled Ex Optime Escriptiis granted to the Archbishop of Morelia, Luis María Altamirano y Bulnes on 26 April 1953. The decree originated from the Apostolic Dataria, Cardinal Federico Tedeschini and was notarized by the Guardian Chancellor of the Vatican Chapter, Monsignor Ferdinand Prosperini Joseph Calderari. Vatican Apostolic Archive.)		
Virgen de la Misericordia	6 October 1954	Basílica de Nuestra Señora de la Misericordia, Apizaco	Pope Pius XII		
La Inmaculada Concepción de San Diego	8 November 1954	Church of San Diego, Aguascalientes	Pope Pius XII		
Virgen de los Dolores del Rayo	28 November 1954	Church of Our Lady of Sorrows of the Lightning, Zinacantepec	Pope Pius XII		
Purísima Concepción	5 December 1954	Parroquia de la Purísima Concepción, Hércules, Coahuila	Pope Pius XII		
Immaculate Heart of Mary	8 December 1954	Cathedral Basilica of Zacatecas	Pope Pius XII		
Virgen de los Milagros	8 December 1954	Parish of Our Lady of Miracles, Tlaltenango	Pope Pius XII		
Inmaculada Concepción	15 December 1954	Parish of Saint John the Baptist, Apaseo el Grande	Pope Pius XII		
Nuestra Señora del Carmen	16 July 1956	Diocesan Marian Shrine of Our Lady of Mount Carmel, Ciudad del Carmen	Pope Pius XII		
Our Lady of Guadalupe	10 January 1957	Conciliar Seminary of Querétaro	Pope Pius XII		
La Purisima Concepcion	8 August 1958	Parroquia de la Purísima Concepción, Purísima del Rincón	Pope Pius XII		
La Inmaculada Concepción, Virgencita del Seminario	8 December 1959	Diocesan Seminary of Leon, Guanajuato	Pope John XXIII (Note: Ioannes XXIII, Papam. — Annum Primo Pontificatus— Apostolica Nostra auctoritate, venerabilem Fratrem Martinum del Campo y Padillae Leonensem Episcopum delegamus, ut in nomine et auctoritate nostra diademate auream redimiri impossit de Imago Beatae Immaculatae Virginis in Seminario Dioecesis conservatae ac venerandae. post missam solemnem, iuxta ritum et formulam praescriptam. Neque ullo modo dubitamus quin ex hoc prospero eventu religio crescat ac christifideles Dioecesis cogantur magis ac magis in dies amare ac Matrem Dei venerari. Contrariis quibuslibet rebus haud obstantibus. Datum Romae, apud Sanctum Petrum, sub anulo Piscatoris, die XIII mensis Februarii anno MDCCCCLIX, Pontificatus Nostri primo.)		
Virgen de la Escalera	7 October 1960	Parish of Saint Michael the Archangel and Our Lady of the Staircase, Tarímbaro	Pope John XXIII		
Virgen de la Soledad	12 January 1961	Sanctuary of Our Lady of Solitude, Jerez de García Salinas	Pope John XXIII		
Virgen de los Dolores	15 May 1961	Parish of Our Lady of Sorrows, Mascota	Pope John XXIII		
Virgen de los Ángeles	26 January 1962	Shrine Parish of Our Lady of the Angels, Tulancingo	Pope John XXIII		
Virgen del Carmen	16 May 1963	Rectory of Our Lady of Mount Carmel, Orizaba	Pope John XXIII		
Nuestra Señora de los Dolores del Soriano	7 February 1964	Basílica de Nuestra Señora de los Dolores del Soriano, Colón, Querétaro	Pope Paul VI		
Purísima Concepción del Coecillo	31 May 1964	Parish of the Immaculate Conception of El Coecillo, León, Guanajuato	Pope John XXIII		
Virgen del Roble	31 May 1964	Basilica of Our Lady of the Oak, Monterrey	Pope Paul VI		
Virgen de la Asunción	15 January 1965	Parish of Our Lady of the Assumption, Tonaya	Pope Paul VI		
Immaculate Conception	12 May 1965	Parish of the Immaculate Conception, Sayula, Jalisco	Pope Paul VI		
Virgen de los Zacatecas	5 June 1965	Cathedral Basilica of Zacatecas	Pope John XXIII (Note: Pontifical decree of coronation granted to Bishop of Zacatecas, Antonio López Aviña, on 15 October 1959. Due to economic problems that time, the coronation would only be carried out in 1965 during Pope Paul VI's pontificate. Vatican Apostolic Archive.)		
Nuestra Señora de la Soledad de Acapulco	8 December 1965	Our Lady of Solitude Cathedral, Acapulco	Pope John XXIII		
Virgen de la Natividad de Atengo	30 August 1966	Parish of Our Lady of the Nativity, Atengo, Jalisco	Pope John XXIII (Note: Pope John XXIII authorized the coronation of the statue on 17 August 1961. Due to necessary preparations, the ceremony would only be carried out 5 years later in 1966.)		
Nuestra Señora de los Dolores	11 November 1966	Parish of Our Lady of Sorrows, Teocaltiche, Jalisco	Pope Paul VI		
Virgen del Patrocinio	15 September 1967	Sanctuary of Our Lady of the Patronage, Bufa Hill, Zacatecas	Pope Paul VI		
Immaculate Conception	25 April 1968	Parish of Saint James the Apostle, Tequila, Jalisco	Pope Paul VI		
Our Lady of Candelaria	2 February 1969	Church of Our Lady of Candelaria, Tlacotalpan	Pope Paul VI		
Nuestra Señora de la Caridad	15 August 1974	Basilica of Our Lady of Charity, Huamantla	Pope Paul VI (Note: Sacra Congregatio pro Sacramentis et Cultu Divino: Prot. n. 1771/74, Diocese of Tlaxcala, 25 July 1974. Vatican Apostolic Archive.)		
Nuestra Señora de los Remedios	19 October 1974	Basilica of Our Lady of Remedies Naucalpan	Pope Paul VI (Note: Sacra Congregatio pro Sacramentis et Cultu Divino: Prot. n. 1551/73, Diocese of Tlalnepantla, 6 March 1974. Vatican Apostolic Archive.)		
Virgen de Guadalupe, Salud de los Enfermos	16 December 1979	Parroquia de Santa María Tulpetlac, Ecatepec de Morelos	Pope John Paul II		
Our Lady of Guadalupe	Decreed on 23 July 1981	Cathedral of Our Lady of Guadalupe, Gómez Palacio, Durango	Pope John Paul II (Note: Sacra Congregatio pro Sacramentis et Cultu Divino: Prot. CD 884/81, Archdiocese of Durango, 23 July 1981. Vatican Apostolic Archive.)		
Our Lady of Guadalupe	17 October 1981	Sanctuary of Our Lady of Guadalupe, Durango	Pope John Paul II (Note: Sacra Congregatio pro Sacramentis et Cultu Divino: Prot. CD 796/81, Archdiocese of Durango, 23 July 1981. Vatican Apostolic Archive.)		
Virgen del Rosario	29 May 1983	Shrine Parish of Our Lady of the Rosary, Alvarado, Veracruz	Pope John Paul II		
Virgen de la Asunción	14 August 1983	Aguascalientes Cathedral	Pope John Paul II		
Virgen de Candelaria	2 February 1989	Diocesan Shrine of Our Lady of Candelaria, Tecoman	Pope John Paul II		
La Virgen Chiquita	10 May 1990	Basílica de la Purísima Concepción—La Virgen Chiquita, Monterrey	Pope John Paul II		
Nuestra Señora del Carmen de Catemaco	18 May 1992	Basilica of Our Lady of Mount Carmel, Catemaco, Veracruz	Pope John Paul II		
Our Lady of Guadalupe	Decreed on 15 September 1994	Parish of Our Lady of Guadalupe, Manzanillo, Colima	Pope John Paul II		
Nuestra Señora de Monterrey	19 September 1996	Monterrey Cathedral	Pope John Paul II		
Inmaculada Concepción	12 May 1999	Basilica of the Immaculate Conception, Chignahuapan	Pope John Paul II (Note: Pope John Paul II, Congregation for Divine Worship and the Discipline of the Sacraments — Protocol Number: 2736/98/L, Archdiocese of Tulancingo, 11 March 1999. Vatican Apostolic Archive.)		
Virgen de Santa Anita	29 May 2004	Shrine Parish of Our Lady of Santa Anita, Tlaquepaque, Jalisco	Pope John Paul II (Note: Pope John Paul II, Congregation for Divine Worship and the Discipline of the Sacraments — Protocol Number: 2270/03/L, Archdiocese of Guadalajara, 28 November 2003. Vatican Apostolic Archive.)		
Nuestra Señora de Loreto	10 December 2004	Parish of Our Lady of Loreto, Loreto, Zacatecas	Pope John Paul II (Note: Pope John Paul II, Congregation for Divine Worship and the Discipline of the Sacraments — Protocol Number: 1775/04/L, Diocese of Aguascalientes, 21 October 2004. Vatican Apostolic Archive.)		
Nuestra Señora de la Asunción	15 August 2011	Parish of Our Lady of the Assumption, Santa María del Río, San Luis Potosí	Pope Benedict XVI (Note: Pope Benedict XVI, Congregation for Divine Worship and the Discipline of the Sacraments — Protocol Number: 14/11/L, Archdiocese of San Luis Potosí, 7 March 2011. Vatican Apostolic Archive.)		
Inmaculada Concepción	11 May 2013	Diocesan Seminary of the Immaculate Conception, Chilapa de Álvarez	Pope Benedict XVI (Note: Pope Benedict XVI, Congregation for Divine Worship and the Discipline of the Sacraments — Protocol Number: 1123/11/L, Diocese of Chilpancingo-Chilapa, 17 December 2011. Vatican Apostolic Archive.)		
Virgen de la Inmaculada Concepción de Juquila	8 October 2014	Santuario de la Inmaculada Virgen de Juquila, Santa Catarina Juquila	Pope Francis (Note: Pope Francis, Congregation for Divine Worship and the Discipline of the Sacraments — Protocol Number: 515/13/L, Archdiocese of Antequera, 12 December 2013. Vatican Apostolic Archive.)		
Virgen de Guadalupe del Agostadero	14 June 2015	Parroquia de Nuestra Señora de Guadalupe del Agostadero, Villa García, Zacatecas	Pope Francis (Note: Pope Francis, Congregation for Divine Worship and the Discipline of the Sacraments — Protocol Number: 307/15, Diocese of Aguascalientes, 21 May 2015. Vatican Apostolic Archive.)		
Our Lady of Guadalupe	6 December 2023	Basilica of Guadalupe, Monterrey	Pope Francis (Note: Pope Francis, Dicastery for Divine Worship and the Discipline of the Sacraments — Protocol Number: 493/22, Archdiocese of Monterrey, 14 March 2023. Vatican Apostolic Archive.)		

=== The Netherlands ===
Official title of the image	Date of coronation	Place of devotion	Authorization by	Marian image	Shrine of devotion
Our Lady of the Sacred Heart	11 December 1873	Basilica of Our Lady of the Sacred Heart, Sittard	Pope Pius IX		
Onze Lieve Vrouw in 't Zand	19 August 1877	Chapel in the Sand, Roermond	Pope Pius IX		
Zoete Lieve Vrouw van Den Bosch	27 March 1878	St. John's Cathedral ('s-Hertogenbosch)	Pope Leo XIII		
Onze Lieve Vrouw, Behoudenis der Kranken	14 September 1884	Parish Church of Our Lady of the Nativity, Oostrum	Pope Leo XIII		
Our Lady, Star of the Sea	15 August 1912	Basilica of Our Lady, Maastricht	Pope Pius X (Note: Pontifical decree of coronation granted to Bishop of Roermond, Joseph Hubert Drehmanns. Vatican Apostolic Archive.)		
Onze Lieve Vrouw van Nijmegen	7 August 1932	Molenstraat Church, Nijmegen	Pope Pius XI (Note: The pontifical decree of coronation was granted by Pope Pius XI on 21 June 1932.)		
Onze Lieve Vrouw ter Linde	15 August 1938	Crusader Chapel of Uden	Pope Pius XI		
Maria ter Weghe	18 October 1955	Maria ter Weghe Kapel, Haastrecht	Pope Pius XII		
Our Lady of the Miraculous Medal	27 May 1956	The Church of Saint Matthias, Maastricht	Pope Pius XII (Note: Pontifical decree of coronation granted to Archbishop of Roermond, Joseph Hubert William Lemmens on 15 March 1956. The wooden statue was supplied in 1840 by the Congregatio Fratrum Immaculatæ Conceptionis based in Maastricht, later transferred to the Church of Saint Matthias after the Second World War.)		

=== Nicaragua ===
Official title of the image	Date of coronation	Place of devotion	Authorization by	Marian image	Shrine of devotion
Our Lady of the Assumption	17 August 1980	Parish of Our Lady of the Assumption, Monimbo, Masaya	Pope John Paul II		
Immaculate Conception of El Viejo	6 May 1989	Basilica and National Shrine of the Immaculate Conception, El Viejo	Pope John Paul II		

=== Panama ===
Official title of the image	Date of coronation	Place of devotion	Authorization by	Marian image	Shrine of devotion
Virgen de la Merced	16 September 2018	Iglesia de la Merced, Panama City	Pope Francis (Note: Pope Francis, Congregation for Divine Worship and the Discipline of the Sacraments — Protocol Number: 301/18, Archdiocese of Panamá, 30 July 2018. Vatican Apostolic Archive.)		
Virgen de la Antigua	9 September 2025	Metropolitan Cathedral of Panama City	Pope Leo XIV (Note: Pope Leo XIV, Dicastery for Divine Worship and the Discipline of the Sacraments — Protocol Number: 288/24, Archdiocese of Panamá, 31 May 2025. Vatican Apostolic Archive.)		

=== Paraguay ===
Official title of the image	Date of coronation	Place of devotion	Authorization by	Marian image	Shrine of devotion
Virgin of Miracles of Caacupé	8 December 1954	Cathedral Basilica and National Shrine of Our Lady of Miracles, Caacupé	Pope Pius XII		
Virgin of the Pillar	12 October 1979	Basilica Shrine of Our Lady of the Pillar, Pilar, Ñeembucú	Pope John Paul II (Note: Sacra Congregatio pro Sacramentis et Cultu Divino: Prot. CD 982/79, Diocese of San Juan Bautista de las Misiones, 24 September 1979. Vatican Apostolic Archive.)		

=== Peru ===
Official title of the image	Date of coronation	Place of devotion	Authorization by	Marian image	Shrine of devotion
Nuestra Señora de la Merced	24 September 1921	Basilica and Convent of Nuestra Señora de la Merced, Lima	Pope Benedict XV (Note: Pontifical decree of coronation granted to Archbishop of Lima, Emilio Lissón signed and notarized on 20 June 1921. Vatican Apostolic Archive.)		
Nuestra Señora del Rosario	2 October 1927	Basilica and Convent of Santo Domingo, Lima	Pope Pius XI (Note: Pontifical decree of coronation granted to Archbishop of Lima, Emilio Lissón signed and notarized on 31 May 1927. Vatican Apostolic Archive.)		
Nuestra Señora de Belén	8 December 1933	Iglesia de Belén, Cusco	Pope Pius XI		
Nuestra Señora de los Dolores, La Napolitana	20 October 1940	Monasterio de la Recoleta, Arequipa	Pope Pius XII		
Nuestra Señora de los Dolores	14 June 1942	Iglesia de San Francisco, Cajamarca	Pope Pius XII		
Nuestra Señora de la Puerta	27 October 1943	Santuario de Nuestra Señora de la Puerta, Otuzco	Pope Pius XII		
Nuestra Señora de Cocharcas	8 September 1946	Santuario de Nuestra Señora de Cocharcas, Apurímac	Pope Pius XII		
Nuestra Señora de la Candelaria	11 May 1947	Parish of Saint Michael the Archangel, Cayma, Arequipa	Pope Pius XII (Note: Pontifical decree of coronation granted to the first Cardinal of Peru, the Archbishop of Lima, Juan Guevara signed and notarized on 2 February 1947. Vatican Apostolic Archive.)		
Nuestra Señora del Carmen	7 October 1951	Basilica of Our Lady of Mount Carmel, Carmen de la Legua Reynoso	Pope Pius XII (Note: Pontifical decree of coronation granted to Archbishop of Lima, Juan Guevara on 12 April 1951. — Sacred Congregation of Rites.)		
Nuestra Señora de la Asunción	15 August 1952	Santuario de Virgen Asunta, Chachapoyas	Pope Pius XII		
Nuestra Señora del Milagro	19 July 1953	Basilica and Convent of San Francisco, Lima	Pope Pius XII		
Nuestra Señora de Guadalupe de Pacasmayo	24 October 1954	Parish of Our Lady of Guadalupe, Pacasmayo	Pope Pius XII		
Nuestra Señora de las Mercedes	27 August 1960	Basilica of Our Lady of Mercy, Paita	Pope John XXIII		
Nuestra Señora de Cocharcas	27 August 1965	Parish of Saint Peter, Sapallanga	Pope Paul VI		
Nuestra Señora de Guadalupe	20 September 1965	College of Our Lady of Guadalupe, Lima	Pope Paul VI		
Nuestra Señora del Socorro	8 December 1971	Parish of Our Lady of Help, Huanchaco	Pope Paul VI		
Nuestra Señora de la Candelaria de Chapi	2 February 1985	Santuario de Chapi, Arequipa	Pope John Paul II		
Nuestra Señora del Carmen	3 February 1985	Sanctuary of Our Lady of Mount Carmel, Paucartambo, Cusco	Pope John Paul II		
Nuestra Señora de Chota	6 August 2003	Cathedral of All Saints, Chota, Cajamarca	Pope John Paul II (Note: Pope John Paul II, Congregation for Divine Worship and the Discipline of the Sacraments — Protocol Number: 694/03/L, Territorial Prelature of Chota, 20 May 2003. Vatican Apostolic Archive.)		
Virgen Inmaculada de Chiclayo	14 November 2026	St. Mary's Cathedral, Chiclayo	Pope Leo XIV		
Nuestra Señora de la Asunción	20 November 2026	Santuario de Nuestra Señora de la Asunción, Cutervo	Pope Leo XIV (Note: Pope Leo XIV, Dicastery for Divine Worship and the Discipline of the Sacraments — Protocol Number: 333/26, Territorial Prelature of Chota, 13 June 2026. Vatican Apostolic Archive.)		

=== Portugal ===
Official title of the image	Date of coronation	Place of devotion	Authorization by	Marian image	Shrine of devotion
Our Lady of Sameiro	12 June 1904	Sanctuary of Our Lady of Sameiro	Pope Pius IX (Note: The image was blessed by the Pope in October 1875, but the pontifical decree was granted on 22 December 1876. It left Rome to Portugal in 1878, upon completion of payment for the manufactured image.)		
Our Lady of Fatima	13 May 1946	Sanctuary of Fátima	Pope Pius XII (Note: Pontifical decree of coronation titled Celeberrima Solemnia granted to Cardinal Benedetto Aloisi Masella, signed and dated on 25 April 1946 by Pope Pius XII via the same Papal legate, Cardinal Benedetto Aloisi Masella. — Pope John Paul II made an addendum by placing his assassination bullet within the same crown in 1982. Out of the six official statues created by José Ferreira Thedim, only the image at the Chapel of the Apparitions (a part of the Sanctuary of Fátima) is canonically crowned.)		
Our Lady of Solitude	17 September 2023 (Note: Simultaneously with the Fourth Pan-European Forum of Brotherhoods and Confraternities.) (Note: By the Cardinal José Tolentino de Mendonça.)	Basilica of Our Lady and Saint Anthony of Mafra	Pope Francis (Note: Pope Francis, Congregation for Divine Worship and the Discipline of the Sacraments — Protocol Number: 165/20, Patriarchate of Lisbon, 10 November 2020. Vatican Apostolic Archive.)		

=== Puerto Rico ===
Official Title of the Image	Date of Coronation	Place of Devotion	Authorization by	Marian Image	Shrine of devotion
Nuestra Señora de la Divina Providencia	5 November 1976	Basílica Catedral Metropolitana de San Juan Bautista, San Juan	Pope Paul VI (Note: Sacra Congregatio pro Sacramentis et Cultu Divino: Prot. CD 566/76, Archdiocese of San Juan de Puerto Rico, 13 September 1976. Vatican Apostolic Archive.)		
Nuestra Señora de Monserrate	12 February 1995	Basílica Santuario de Nuestra Señora de Monserrate, Hormigueros	Pope John Paul II		

=== Slovakia ===
Official title of the image	Date of coronation	Place of devotion	Authorization by	Marian image	Shrine of devotion
Our Lady of Seven Sorrows	8 September 1864	Basilica and National Shrine of the Virgin of Seven Sorrows, Šaštín-Stráže	Pope Pius IX		

=== Slovenia ===
Official title of the image	Date of coronation	Place of devotion	Authorization by	Marian image	Shrine of devotion
Our Lady of the Holy Mountain of Gorizia	6 June 1717	Basilica of the Assumption, Sveta Gora	Pope Clement XI		
Mary Help of Christians	1 September 1907	Basilica and National Shrine of Mary Help of Christians, Brezje	Pope Pius X		
Our Lady of the Apparition	14 August 1912	Parish Church of the Apparition, Strunjan	Pope Pius X		

=== Sri Lanka ===
Official title of the image	Date of coronation	Place of devotion	Authorization by	Marian image	Shrine of devotion
Our Lady of the Rosary	2 July 1924	National Shrine of Our Lady of Madhu, Mannar District	Pope Benedict XV (Note: Pontifical decree of coronation granted to the Prefect of the Sacred Congregation for the Propagation of the Faith, Cardinal Willem Marinus van Rossum; signed by the Canon of the Vatican Chapter and notarized by the Secretary of Apostolic Dataria, Monsignor Domenico Jorio on 7 April 1921. Vatican Apostolic Archive.)		
Our Lady of Lanka	6 February 1974	Basilica and National Shrine of Our Lady of Lanka, Tewatte	Pope Paul VI (Note: Sacra Congregatio pro Sacramentis et Cultu Divino: Prot. n. 1818/71, Archdiocese of Colombo, 23 October 1971. Vatican Apostolic Archive.)		

=== Switzerland ===
Official title of the image	Date of coronation	Place of devotion	Authorization by	Marian image	Shrine of devotion
Notre Dame du Vorbourg	12 September 1869	Chapel of Our Lady of Vorbourg, Delémont	Pope Pius IX (Note: Pontifical decree titled Admotæ Nobis signed and granted to the Bishop of Basel, Eugène Amable Jean Claude Lachat on 3 September 1869. Vatican Apostolic Archive.)		
Madonna del Sasso	14 August 1880	Sanctuary of Madonna del Sasso, Orselina	Pope Leo XIII		
Our Lady of Fribourg, Glorious Queen of the Universe	21 August 1902	Basilica of Our Lady of Fribourg	Pope Leo XIII (Note: Pontifical decree titled Didicimus Nobis granted to the Bishop of Lausanne and Geneva, Joseph Deruaz on 12 August 1902. Signed and notarized by Cardinal Luigi Macchi. Redeclared by Pope Pius XI via Venerabile Fratre Lausannensium which raised the shrine to the status of Minor Basilica on 16 May 1932 on the thirtieth occasion of canonical coronation. Signed by Vatican Secretary of State, Cardinal Eugenio Pacelli. Vatican Apostolic Archive.)		
Our Lady of Grace (Gnadenbild)	15 August 1926	Mariastein Abbey	Pope Pius XI		
Madonna dei Miracoli	29 July 1927	Basilica Shrine of Our Lady of Miracles, Morbio Inferiore	Pope Pius XI		
Our Lady of the Hermits	14 August 1934	Einsiedeln Abbey	Pope Pius XI (Note: Pontifical decree of coronation titled Non Levi Animi Delectatione granted to Archbishop of Milan, Alfredo Ildefonso Schuster on 21 March 1934. — Vatican Apostolic Archive.)		
Notre Dame de Genève	23 May 1937	Basilica of Our Lady of Geneva	Pope Pius XI (Note: Pontifical decree of coronation granted to the Bishop of Lausanne, Geneva and Fribourg, Marius Besson on 26 April 1936. Vatican Apostolic Archive.)		
Madonna delle Grazie	19 May 1940	Shrine of Our Lady of Grace within Lugano Cathedral	Pope Pius XII		
Santa Maria di Calanca	7 June 1959	Parish Church of Santa Maria Assunta, Santa Maria in Calanca	Pope John XXIII (Note: The pontifical decree of coronation was granted by Pope John XXIII on 25 January 1959, for the Diocese of Chur.)		

=== Taiwan (Republic of China) ===
Official title of the image	Date of coronation	Place of devotion	Authorization by	Marian image	Shrine of devotion
Our Lady of China	14 August 2022	The National Shrine of Our Lady of China, Meishan, Chiayi	Pope Francis (Note: Pope Francis, Congregation for Divine Worship and the Discipline of the Sacraments — Protocol Number: 464/20, Diocese of Chiayi, 19 February 2021. Vatican Apostolic Archive.)		

=== Turkey ===
Official title of the image	Date of coronation	Place of devotion	Authorization by	Marian image	Shrine of devotion
Santa Maria Draperis	25 March 1911	Church of St. Mary Draperis, Istanbul	Pope Pius X		

=== Ukraine ===
Official title of the image	Date of coronation	Place of devotion	Authorization by	Marian image	Shrine of devotion
Our Lady of Lutsk	8 September 1749	Dominican Monastery of Lutsk	Pope Benedict XIV		
Our Lady of Berdyczow	16 July 1756 (destroyed original icon) 19 July 1998 (reconstruction)	The Discalced Carmelite monastery of Berdychiv	Pope Benedict XIV Pope John Paul II		
Theotokos of Pochayiv	8 September 1773	Pochayiv Lavra	Pope Clement XIV		
Our Lady, Queen of Peace of Janow	29 May 1774	Church of the Holy Trinity, Ivano-Frankove	Pope Clement XIV		
Our Lady of Bilshivtsi	18 August 1777	Carmelite Church and Sanctuary of Our Lady of Bilshivtsi	Pope Clement XIII		
Our Lady of Mezhyrich	15 August 1779	Holy Trinity Monastery of Mezhyrich	Pope Benedict XIV		
Theotokos of Zarvanytsia	28 August 1867	Holy Trinity Church, Zarvanytsia	Pope Pius IX		
Our Lady of Graces, Gracious Star of Lviv (Replica)	26 June 2001	Cathedral Basilica of the Assumption, Lviv	Pope Francis (Note: Pope John Paul II personally crowned the icon in 2001 during his apostolic visit to the country. On 20 November 2013, Pope Francis officially decreed the coronation with special privileges through the Congregation for Divine Worship — Protocol Number: 790/12/L, Archdiocese of Lviv of the Latins, 20 November 2013. Vatican Apostolic Archive.)		
Our Mother of Perpetual Help	8 September 2001	Parish of the Nativity of Saint John the Baptist, Mostyska	Pope John Paul II (Note: Pope John Paul II, Congregation for Divine Worship and the Discipline of the Sacraments — Protocol Number: 2601/00/L, Archdiocese of Lviv of the Latins, 13 July 2001. Vatican Apostolic Archive.)		
Our Lady of the Rosary	29 August 2009	Saint Stanislaus Parish, Chortkiv	Pope Benedict XVI (Note: Pope Benedict XVI, Congregation for Divine Worship and the Discipline of the Sacraments — Protocol Number: 592/07/L, Archdiocese of Lviv of the Latins, 24 May 2007. Vatican Apostolic Archive.)		
Our Lady of Fatima	13 May 2017	Parish of Our Lady of Fatima, Krysowice, Lviv Oblast	Pope Francis (Note: Pope Francis, Congregation for Divine Worship and the Discipline of the Sacraments — Protocol Number: 251/17, Archdiocese of Lviv of the Latins, 8 May 2017. Vatican Apostolic Archive.)		
Our Lady of the Assumption	15 August 2022	Assumption of the Blessed Virgin Mary Cathedral, Odesa	Pope Francis (Note: Pope Francis, Congregation for Divine Worship and the Discipline of the Sacraments — Protocol Number: 7/22, Diocese of Odesa-Simferopol, 14 March 2022. Vatican Apostolic Archive.)		

=== United Kingdom ===
Official title of the image	Date of coronation	Place of devotion	Authorization by	Marian image	Shrine of devotion
Our Lady of Consolation	12 July 1893	Shrine of Our Lady of Consolation, West Grinstead	Pope Leo XIII		
Our Lady of Walsingham (Note: Crowned by the Papal legate to Great Britain, Gerald O'Hara on the Feast of the Assumption 1954 with gold donations from devotees accompanied with Papal bull from Rome. No canonical approval yet granted for "Our Lady of Willesden" or "Our Lady of Caversham".)	15 August 1954	Basilica of Our Lady of Walsingham	Pope Pius XII		

=== United States of America ===
Official title of the image	Date of coronation	Place of devotion	Authorization by	Marian image	Shrine of devotion
Our Lady of Prompt Succor	10 November 1895	National Shrine of Our Lady of Prompt Succor. New Orleans, Louisiana	Pope Leo XIII (Note: Pontifical decree of coronation granted on 21 June 1894 to Bishop of New Orleans, Francis Janssens y August. The statue was funded by Reverend Mother Saint Michel, and was later granted the title of Archconfraternity. Decree was notarized by the Sacred Congregation de Propaganda Fide.)		
Our Lady of Mount Carmel	10 July 1904	Parish Church of Our Lady of Mount Carmel. Manhattan, New York City	Pope Leo XIII (Note: Pontifical decree of coronation granted to Father Scipio Tofini of the Order of Pallotines on 12 May 1903.)		
Our Lady of the Conquest	26 June 1960	Cathedral Basilica of Saint Francis of Assisi. Santa Fe, New Mexico	Pope John XXIII		
Mary of Nazareth	15 April 1998	National Shrine of Our Lady of Czestochowa. Doylestown, Pennsylvania	Pope John Paul II (Note: Pope John Paul II personally blessed and crowned the image in 1998, whilst its coronation being decreed only in 2001: Congregation for Divine Worship and the Discipline of the Sacraments — Protocol Number: 1445/01/L, Archdiocese of Philadelphia, 19 July 2001. Vatican Apostolic Archive.)		
Our Lady of Immaculate Conception	22 August 2013	Cathedral of the Immaculate Conception. Lake Charles, Louisiana	Pope Benedict XVI (Note: Pope Benedict XVI authorized the coronation in 2012, due to the process of waiting for the finished crown occurred on 22 August 2013, at Pope Francis' new pontificate via the Papal nuncio to the country, Archbishop Carlo Maria Vigano. The crown was manufactured in Rome by the gold artisans, Fratelli Savi Gioielli.)		
Our Lady of La Leche	10 October 2021	National Shrine of Our Lady of La Leche, Mission Nombre de Dios. St. Augustine, Florida	Pope Francis (Note: Pope Francis, Congregation for Divine Worship and the Discipline of the Sacraments — Protocol Number: 251/18, Diocese of St. Augustine, 24 January 2019. Vatican Apostolic Archive.)		
Our Lady of Mount Carmel	16 July 2025	Parish of Our Lady of Mount Carmel. Hammonton, New Jersey	Pope Francis (Note: Pope Francis, Dicastery for Divine Worship and the Discipline of the Sacraments — Protocol Number: 145/25, Diocese of Camden, 3 March 2025. Vatican Apostolic Archive.)		

=== Uruguay ===
Official title of the image	Date of coronation	Place of devotion	Authorization by	Marian image	Shrine of devotion
Virgin of the Thirty-Three	12 November 1962	Cathedral Basilica and National Shrine of Our Lady of the Thirty-Three, Florida	Pope John XXIII (Note: Pope John XXIII issued the coronation bull Magna Dei, hominuimque Mater on 8 May 1961, granting the privilege of crowning the image. The ceremony was carried out on November 12, along with the National Pilgrimage to her shrine. Vatican Secret Archives.)		

=== Venezuela ===
Official title of the image	Date of coronation	Place of devotion	Authorization by	Marian image	Shrine of devotion
Virgen del Socorro	13 November 1910	Cathedral Basilica of Our Lady of Help (Valencia, Venezuela)	Pope Pius X (Note: Pontifical decree of coronation Urbi Valentinæ redeclared by Pope John XXIII on 10 February 1960 for the fiftieth anniversary of the coronation of the venerated image along with raising its status to Minor Basilica.)		
Virgen del Valle	8 September 1911	Basilica of Our Lady of El Valle, El Valle del Espíritu Santo	Pope Pius X		
Nuestra Señora de Chiquinquirá	18 November 1942	Basilica of Our Lady of Chiquinquirá, Maracaibo	Pope Benedict XV (Note: Coronation authorized by decree of Pope Benedict XV, being granted to the Bishop of Zulia, Arturo Celestino Álvarez on 16 July 1917. The coronation took place after 25 years in 1942 under the pontificate of Pope Pius XII.)		
Our Lady of Coromoto (original image)	11 September 1952	Basilica of the National Shrine of Our Lady of Coromoto, Guanare	Pope Pius XII		
La Divina Pastora	14 January 1956	Church of the Divine Shepherdess, Barquisimeto	Pope Pius XII		
Virgen de la Caridad	22 January 1960	Parish of Saint Sebastian Martyr, San Sebastián, Aragua	Pope Pius XII (Note: Coronation petitioned and approve by Pope Pius XII in 1956.)		
Virgen de Belen	31 January 1965	Sanctuary of Our Lady of Bethlehem—Parish of Saint Matthew the Apostle, San Mateo, Aragua	Pope John XXIII		
Virgen de Chiquinquirá	2 October 1966	Sanctuary of Our Lady of Chiquinquirá, Aregue, Lara	Pope Paul VI (Note: Pontifical decree of coronation titled Magna fidelium veneratione granted to the Bishop of Barquisimeto, Críspulo Benítez Fontúrvel on 23 November 1965. — Vatican Apostolic Archive.)		
Virgin of Consolation	12 March 1967	Basilica of Our Lady of Consolation, Táriba	Pope John XXIII		
Our Lady of Coromoto (Marian statue)	27 January 1985	Cathedral Basilica of Our Lady of Coromoto, Guanare	Pope John Paul II		
Nuestra Señora de la Soledad	24 April 1988	Iglesia de San Francisco (Caracas)	Pope John Paul II		
Nuestra Señora de Guadalupe de El Carrizal	12 December 1992	Basilica of Our Lady of Guadalupe of El Carrizal, La Vela de Coro	Pope John Paul II		
Virgen de las Mercedes	12 February 2004	Sanctuary of Our Lady of Mercy, Río Chico	Pope John Paul II (Note: Pope John Paul II, Congregation for Divine Worship and the Discipline of the Sacraments — Protocol Number: 132/04/L, Diocese of Guarenas, 3 February 2004. Vatican Apostolic Archive.)		
Virgen de Altagracia	26 December 2014	Parroquia de Nuestra Señora de Altagracia, Los Puertos de Altagracia	Pope Benedict XVI (Note: Pope Benedict XVI, Congregation for Divine Worship and the Discipline of the Sacraments — Protocol Number: 786/12/L, Diocese of Cabimas, 24 January 2013. Vatican Apostolic Archive.)		
Virgen del Pilar	25 March 2021	Diocesan Shrine and Parish of Our Lady of the Pillar, Carúpano	Pope Francis (Note: Pope Francis, Congregation for Divine Worship and the Discipline of the Sacraments — Protocol Number: 185/20, Diocese of Carúpano, 16 July 2020. Vatican Apostolic Archive.)		
Virgen de la Peña Admirable	23 September 2023	Archdiocesan Shrine of Our Lady of the Admirable Rock—Parish of Saint Catherine of Siena, Parapara, Guarico	Pope Francis (Note: Pope Francis, Congregation for Divine Worship and the Discipline of the Sacraments — Protocol Number: 517/19, Archdiocese of Calabozo, 22 April 2020. Vatican Apostolic Archive.)		
Virgen de Copacabana	21 November 2026	Cathedral of Our Lady of Copacabana, Guarenas	Pope Leo XIV		

== Pontifically crowned Christological images ==
The list below enumerates approved Christological images with a written and expressed pontifical recognition and were granted a canonical coronation.

Official title of the image	Date of coronation	Place of devotion	Authorization	Christological Image	Shrine of devotion
Infant Jesus of Prague	24 September 1824 27 September 2009	Church of Our Lady of Victories, Prague, Czech Republic	Pope Leo XII (Note: Pontifical letter of decree by Pope Leo XII to the Council Patriarch of the Vatican Chapter, Cardinal Pietro Francesco Galleffi authorizing the formal imposition of a manufactured golden diadem. Sacred Congregation of Rites. — Vatican Secret Archives.) Pope Benedict XVI		
Santo Bambino of Aracoeli	2 May 1897	Basilica of Santa Maria in Aracoeli, Italy	Pope Leo XIII		
El Señor del Milagro	13 September 1902	Cathedral of Salta, Argentina	Pope Leo XIII (Note: Pontifical decree of coronation granted by the Rosary Pope on 23 July 1899 to the Bishop Ordinary of Salta, Matías Linares Sanzetenea. He was the first Catholic Bishop born in Salta, Argentina.)		
Sacred Heart of Jesus	25 June 1903	Basilica of the Sacred Heart of Berchem, Belgium	Pope Leo XIII (Note: Pontifical letter of decree Aedes Deo Sacras granted to the Archbishop of Malines, Monsigneur Pierre-Lambert Goosens on 28 April 1903, authorizing the formal imposition of a golden diadem on the head of the Sacred Heart of Christ. Signed by Cardinal Aloysius Luigi Macchi and notarized by the Sacred Congregation of Rites. — Vatican Secret Archives. — Leonis XIII, Papam — Dilecte Fili Noster, salutem et Apostolicam benedictionem. Aedes Deo Sacras, arte non minus quam cultu ac fidelium concursu celebratas, praecipuis honoribus ex more institutoque Romanorum Pontificum ditare libenti quidem animo solemus. Novimus itaque in tua ista dioecesi Mechliniensi, idest in sub- urbio Antverpiae civitatis vulgo Berchem nuncupato, insigne extare templum Sanctissimi Iesu Cordi dicatum, et ab hac Apostolica Sede titulo Basilicae minoris auctum, cui pia filiarum ab eodem Sanctissimi Corde Congregatio inservit, et quod christianus populus summa religione veneratur. Cum vero quintus et vigesimus annus ab hoc extructo templo propediem expleatur, Tuque, dilecte Fili Noster, hac data occasione instanter a Nobis petieris, ut ibidem positam Sanctissimi Iesu Cordis imaginem habeas coronandi facultatem; Nos, quo tam frugifer cultus magis magisque augeatur in dies, piis huiusmodi votis censuimus obsecun- dandum. Quare omnes et singulos, quibus hae Nostrae Litterae favent a quibusvis excom m unicationis et interdicti aliisque ecclesiasticis sententiis, censuris ac poenis, si quas forte incurrerit, huius tantum rei gratia absolventes et absolutos fore censentes, tibi, dilecte Fili Noster, praesentium tenore committimus, ut dictam Sanctissimi Iesu Cordis imaginem in memorato templo Suburbii Antverpiensis existentem die per te eligendo sollemni ritu, servatisque servandis, Nostro nomine et auctoritate coronare licite queas. Quo autem sollemne huiusmodi Sacrum in spirituale quoque Christifidelium bonum cedat, omnibus ac singulis utriusque sexus fidelibus, qui vere poenitentes et confessi ac S. Communione refecti, ipso Coronationis die, vel in posterum diebus eiusdem Coronationis anniversariis praefatum templum visitaverint, ibique ante supradictam Sanctissimi Iesu Cordis imaginem pro Christianorum Principum concordia, haeresum extirpatione, peccatorum conversione atque Sanctae Matris Ecclesiae exaltatione, pias ad Deum preces effuderint, Plenariam omnium peccatorum suorum indulgentiam et remissionem, quam etiam animabus Christifidelium, quae Deo in charitate coniunctae ab hac luce migraverint, per modum suffragii applicari posse con- cedimus ac largimur. Non obstantibus contrariis quibuscumque. — Datum Romae apud Sancti Petrum sub annulo Piscatoris die 28 Aprilis 1903, Pontificatus Nostri anno vigesimo sexto. — Sigillium Vaticanus — Sacra Congregatione Rituum — Aloysius Cardinalem Macchi.)		
Sacred Heart of Jesus	20 September 1908	Nevers Cathedral (former) Church of the Sacred Heart, Besançon, France	Pope Pius X		
Bambino Gesu of Arenzano	6 September 1924	Basilica of Arenzano, Italy	Pope Pius XI (Note: Pontifical letter of decree dated 24 February 1924 that was granted to the Cardinal Rafael Merry del Val. — Vatican Secret Archives.)		
Amo Jesús	10 July 1954	Convent of Saint Dominic, Santiago del Estero, Argentina	Pope Pius XII		
Santo Niño de Cebú	28 April 1965	Basílica del Santo Niño, Cebu, Philippines	Pope Paul VI (Note: Pontifical decree titled Cunabula Religionis granted on 27 February 1964. — Vatican Secret Archives.)		
Infant Jesus of Prague	23 June 1999	Church of Santa Maria della Purità, Pagani, Italy	Pope John Paul II (Note: Pope John Paul II, Congregation for Divine Worship and the Discipline of the Sacraments — Protocol Number: 2597/99/L, 7 December 1999. Vatican Secret Archives.)		

== Pontifically crowned Josephian images ==
The list below enumerates images of Saint Joseph with a written and expressed pontifical recognition, and granted a decree of canonical coronation.

Official title of the image	Date of coronation	Place of devotion	Authorization	Josephian image	Shrine
Saint Joseph of Kalisz (Note: Saint Joseph within the icon of the Holy Family. The image of Saint Joseph wears a golden ring donated by Pope John XXIII in 1963, accompanied with a personal letter of "consecration".)	15 May 1796	Basilica of Our Lady of Assumption, Kalisz, Poland	Pope Pius VI		
Saint Joseph du Bruxelles (Extinct since the Second World War)	20 October 1869	Saint Joseph's Church, Brussels, Belgium	Pope Pius IX (Note: Coronation requested by the Carmelite fathers. Pontifical letter granted to the Archbishop of Malines, Primate of Belgium Victor-Auguste-Isidor Deschamps on 20 October 1869. The rite of coronation was executed by Cardinal Giacomo Cattani. Notarized and copied. Vatican Secret Archives.)		
Saint Joseph du Beauvais	14 July 1872	Chapel of Saint Joseph, Beauvais, Oise, France	Pope Pius IX		
Saint Joseph of Mill Hill	13 April 1874	St Michael's Abbey, Farnborough, United Kingdom	Pope Pius IX		
Saint Joseph du Tarascon	30 September 1874	Basilica of the Immaculate Conception of Frigolet Abbey, Tarascon, France	Pope Pius IX		
Saint Joseph du Liège	23 March 1879	Collegiate Church of Saint John the Evangelist, Liège, Belgium	Pope Leo XIII		
Saint Joseph of Wisconsin	8 May 1892	National Shrine of Saint Joseph, De Pere, Wisconsin, United States	Pope Leo XIII		
Saint Joseph du Allex	2 September 1900	Sanctuary of Saint Joseph, Allex, France	Pope Leo XIII		
Saint Joseph de Soignies	10 September 1902	Hainaut Province	Pope Leo XIII		
San Giuseppe di Arcevia	26 July 1904	Church of Saint Blaise, Arcevia, Italy	Pope Leo XIII		
Saint Joseph du Chene	29 August 1906	Chapel of Saint Joseph, Villedieu-la-Blouère, France	Pope Pius X (Note: Pontifical decree granted by Pope Pius X to the Bishop of Angers, Joseph Rumeau on 27 July 1906. Vatican Secret Archives.)		
Saint Joseph du Mont—Royal	19 March 1910 (statue enshrined in the oil-burning Chapel) 9 August 1955	Chapel of Saint André Besette, Côte-des-Neiges (former) Basilica of Saint Joseph's Oratory, Montreal, Canada	Pope Pius X Pope Pius XII (Note: Pontifical decree of coronation titled Praerito Quidem Anno granted to Cardinal Archbishop Paul-Émile Léger on 21 July 1955. Vatican Secret Archives.)		
San José de la Montaña	17 April 1921	Reial Santuari de Sant Josep de la Muntanya, Barcelona, Spain	Pope Benedict XV (Note: Pontifical decree of coronation granted to the Archbishop of Toledo, Cardinal Enrique Reig y Casanova on 1 January 1920. The rite of coronation was executed by the Bishop of Barcelona, Ramon Guillamet y Coma. Vatican Secret Archives.)		
Saint Joseph du Kermaria	14 August 1921	Motherhouse Cloister of the Daughters of Jesus of Kermaria, Locmine, Morbihan, France	Pope Benedict XV		
San Jose de las Flores	28 October 1956	Basilica of Saint Joseph de Flores, Buenos Aires, Argentina	Pope Pius XII		
Señor San José de Zapotlán	22 October 1957	Ciudad Guzmán Cathedral, Zapotlán el Grande, Mexico	Pope Pius XII (Note: Pontifical decree of coronation granted on 27 March 1957 to the former Archbishop of Guadalajara, Francisco Orozco y Jiménez on behalf of the nobility in Zapotlan. Rite of coronation was executed by three prelates, Archbishop of Guadalajara, José Garibi y Rivera (Saint Joseph), the Papal nuncio to the country, Cardinal Luigi Raimondi (the Child Jesus) and Archbishop of Mexico, Miguel Darío Miranda y Gómez (the "Virgin of the Holy Rosary"). Vatican Secret Archives.)		
Saint Joseph du Bon—Espoìr (Crypt statue)	13 August 1961	Basilica of Saint Joseph of Good Hope, Espaly-Saint-Marcel, France	Pope John XXIII		
San Ġużepp du Rabat	1 May 1963	Church of the Nativity of Our Lady, Rabat, Malta	Pope Pius XII (Note: The Papal Bull stored within the Vatican Secret Archives was signed by Pope Pius XII on 27 July 1956.)		
El Santísimo José de Ávila Coronado	24 August 1963	Convent of Saint Joseph, Ávila, Spain	Pope John XXIII		
