= Chapel of Our Lady of Peace of Picpus =

Chapel in Paris, France

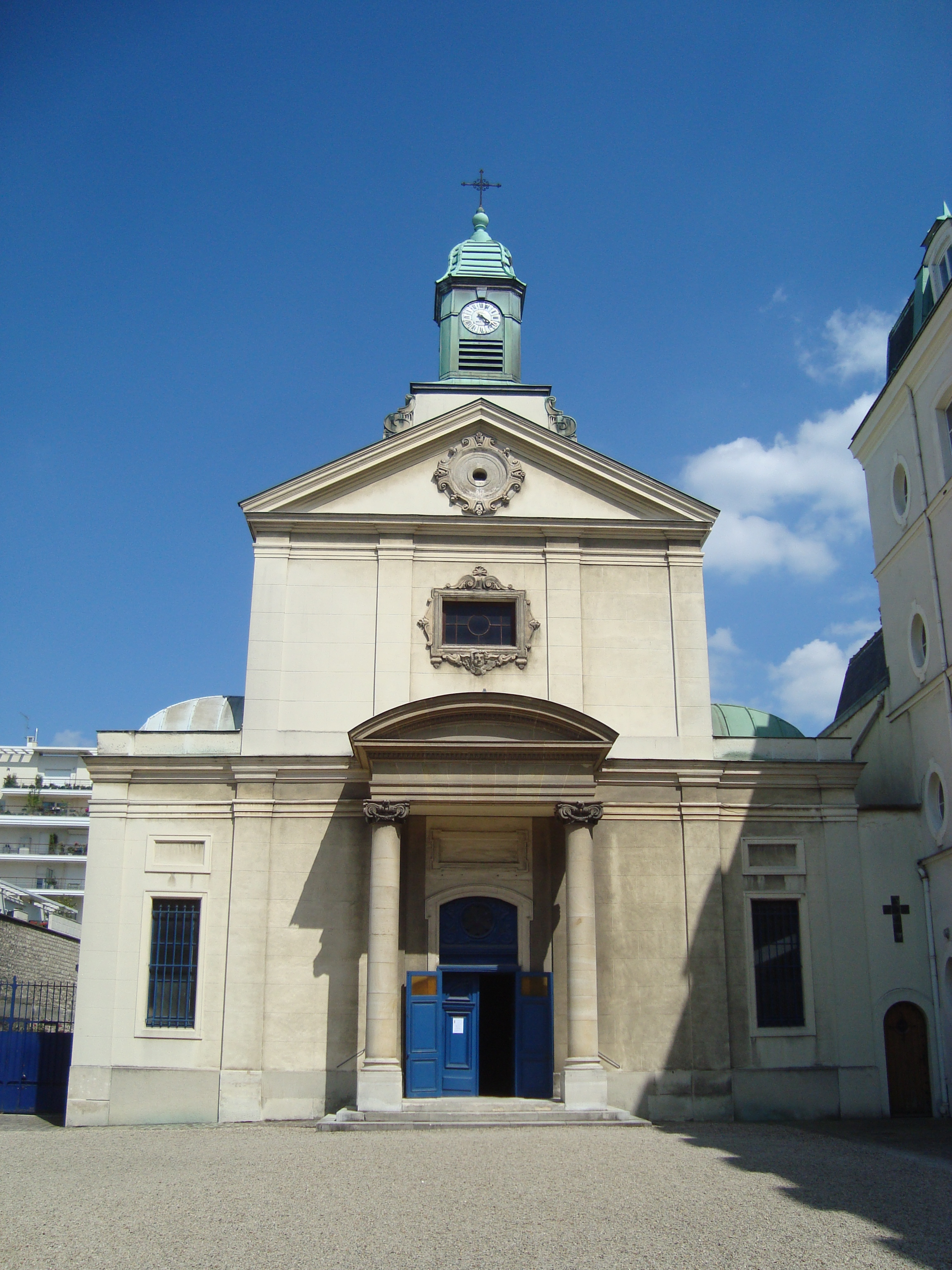

Religion
- Affiliation: Catholic
- Province: Paris
- Region: Ile de France

Location
- Country: France
- Interactive map of Chapel of Our Lady of Peace of Picpus
- Coordinates: 48.8443°N 2.3973°E

The Catholic chapel Chapel of Our Lady of Peace of Picpus (French: Chapelle Notre-Dame-de-la-Paix de Picpus) is located at rue de Picpus (entrance via No. 35) in the quartier de Picpus of the 12th arrondissement of Paris.

== Architecture ==
It was constructed in 1841 by the architect Joseph-Antoine Froelicher.

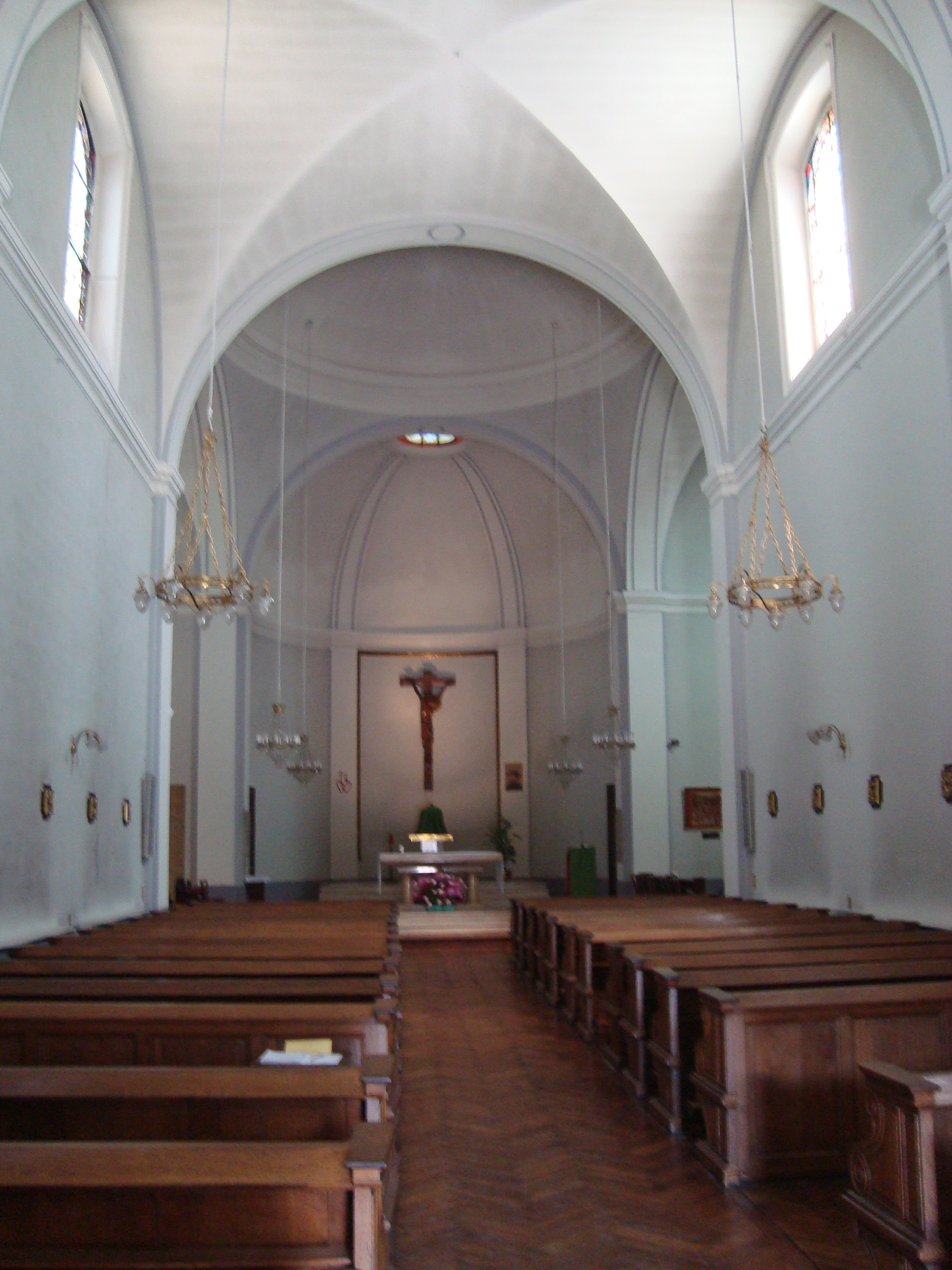
View of the interior of the chapel.

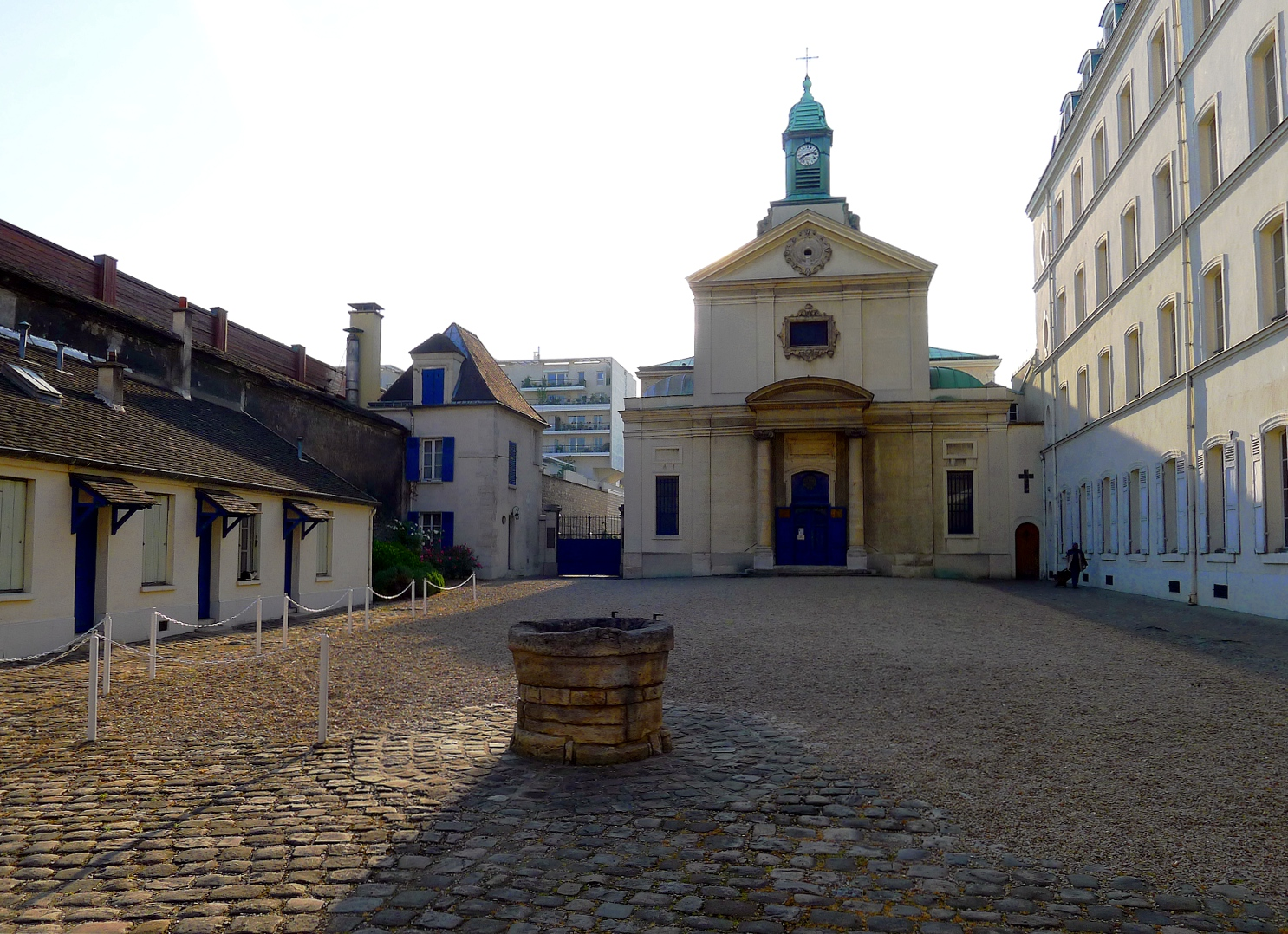
The chapel, the small adjoining square and the entrance to the cemetery at the back, on the left.
