= St. Bernard Cathedral, San Bernardo =

St. Bernard Cathedral
- Catedral de San Bernardo
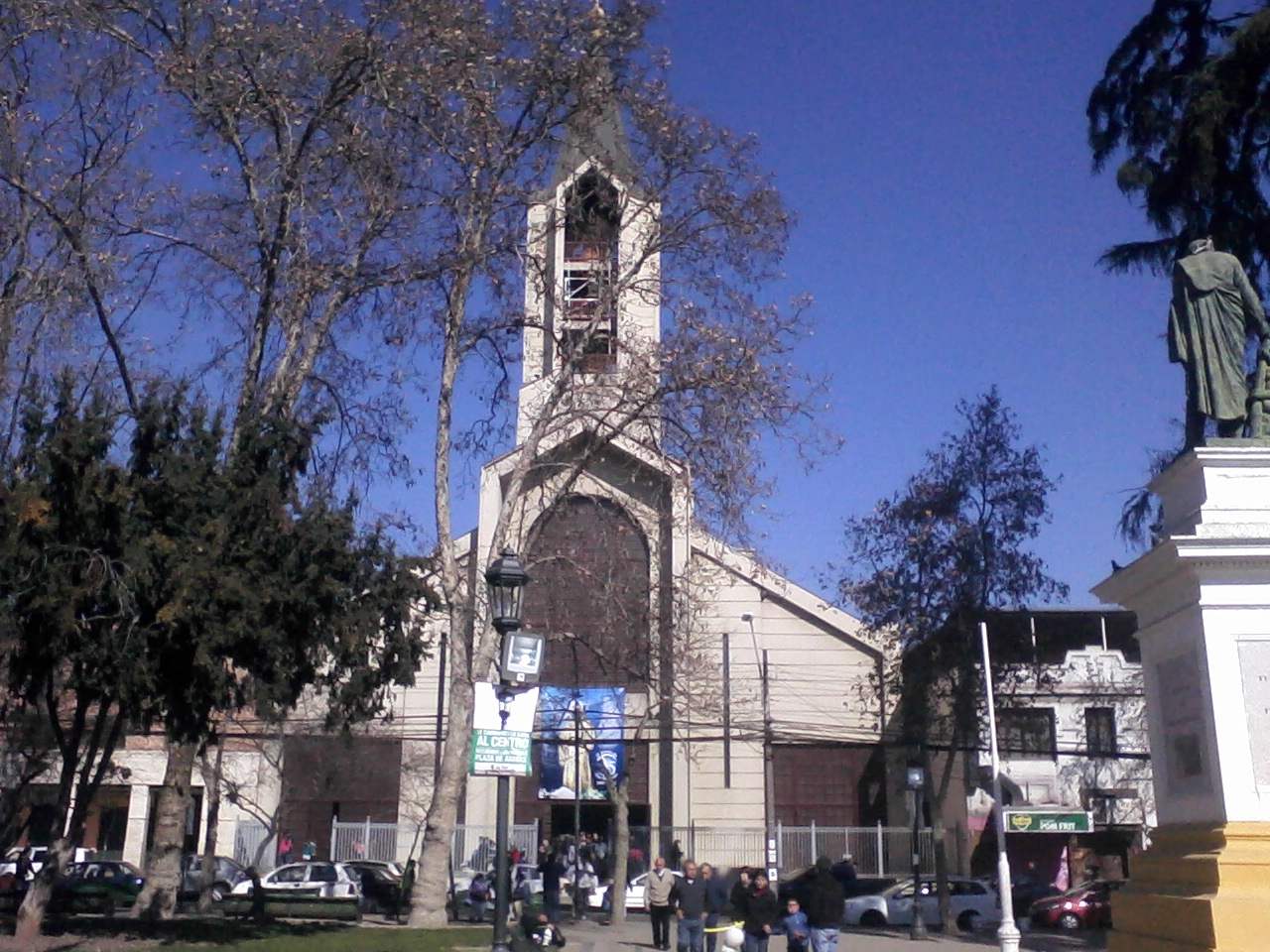
- St. Bernard Cathedral
- 3°35′35″S 70°42′17″W
- Location: Arturo Prat 521, San Bernardo
- Country: Chile
- Denomination: Roman Catholic Church

History
- Status: Cathedral
- Consecrated: November 25, 2000

Architecture
- Years built: 1820, 2000

Administration
- Diocese: Roman Catholic Diocese of San Bernardo

The St. Bernard Cathedral (also San Bernardo Cathedral; Spanish: Catedral de San Bernardo) is the main Catholic church and seat of the Bishopric of San Bernardo, located to one side of the Plaza de Armas de San Bernardo, in the metropolitan area of Santiago, Chile.

The original cathedral was built in 1820 as the seat of the city's parish. It functioned in this way until 1987, when it was elevated to cathedral of the new Diocese of San Bernardo. The earthquakes it had to withstand and some structural defects led to the destruction of the church. A new one was built in its place, which was finally inaugurated on November 25, 2000, being consecrated by Cardinal Darío Castrillón Hoyos, Pontifical Legate for the celebration of the Great Jubilee of 2000 in Chile.

== See also ==
- Roman Catholicism in Chile
- St. Bernard
