= Arthur Colgan =

American Roman Catholic bishop

His Excellency, The Most Reverend Arthur Joseph Colgan
- Auxiliary Bishop of Chosica; Titular Bishop of Ampora
- Diocese: Chosica
- Appointed: October 13, 2015
- Installed: December 12, 2015
- Other post: Titular Bishop of Ampora

Orders
- Ordination: October 27, 1973 by James Louis Connolly
- Consecration: December 12, 2015 by Norbert Klemens Strotmann Hoppe, Jorge Izaguirre Rafael, and Luis Armando Bambarén Gastelumendi

Personal details
- Born: November 8, 1946 (age 79) Dorchester, Massachusetts

Styles of Arthur Joseph Colgan
- Reference style: His Excellency; The Most Reverend
- Spoken style: Your Excellency
- Religious style: Bishop

Arthur Joseph Colgan C.S.C. (born November 8, 1946) is an American priest of the Catholic Church who served as auxiliary bishop for the Diocese of Chosica, Peru.

== Biography ==
=== Early life ===
Colgan was born in Dorchester, Boston, Massachusetts and graduated from Boston College High School. He went to Boston College and then graduated from Stonehill College in 1968.

=== Priesthood ===
He was ordained to the priesthood for the Congregation of Holy Cross on October 27, 1973.

=== Episcopal career ===
He was consecrated a bishop on December 12, 2015, and has served as auxiliary for the Roman Catholic Diocese of Chosica, Peru, since 2015.
