= Antonio Salinas y Castañeda =

Peruvian landowner and politician

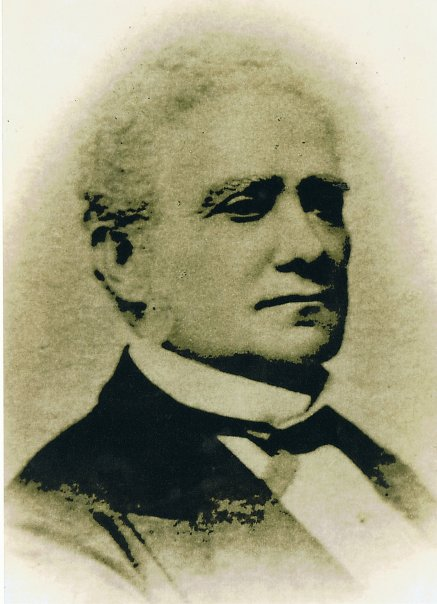

Personal details
- Born: June 13, 1810; Sayán, Viceroyalty of Peru, Spanish Empire
- Died: October 18, 1874 (aged 64); Lima, Peru
- Profession: Businessman

Antonio de Salinas Varona y Castañeda (1810–1874) was a wealthy Peruvian landowner and conservative politician.

== Biography ==
He was born in Sayán. He became Mayor of Lima between 1866 and 1868, was a congressman from 1845 to 1851, and President of the Constitutional Congress in 1867. His father, Anselmo Manuel de Salinas Varona y Céspedes, born in Espinosa de Los Monteros (Spain), was a coronel of the Spanish Army and bought the estates of the Augustinians in the Huaura Valley of the Sayán District, 100 miles north of Lima, including the important Andahuasi Estate. His mother, Petronila Maria Ignacia Matanzas de Castañeda de Oyor, was the daughter of Spanish nobles settled in Cajamarca. He married Paula de Cossío y Centurión and lived both in his Quipico Estate and his House in Lima.

As his father he became coronel, but the Peruvian Army. As an important landowner, he led the meeting of the main landowners of the country for an indemnity after slavery abolition and ruled, next to Manuel Pardo y Lavalle the commission who promoted the Rural Police Force and the immigration of Asians to replace former slaves as a workforce during Ramón Castilla government. Mayor of Lima in 1866 and 1868, he organized the first Fire brigade during the Spanish attack to the Callao Harbour on May 2, 1866. He was a Deputy in the Congress of the Republic of Peru from 1845 to 1851. He died in Lima.

Preceded by Antonio Gutiérrez de la Fuente	Mayor of Lima; 1866–1868	Succeeded by Antonio Gutiérrez de la Fuente
