= Carabayllo =

Carabayllo may refer to:

- Carabayllo District, Peru
- Roman Catholic Diocese of Carabayllo, Peru
