= Lisson =

Lisson may refer to:

== People ==
- Emilio Lissón, Archbishop of Lima, Peru
- Mario Lisson, baseball player

== Other ==
- Lisson Gallery, art gallery
- Lisson Grove, district of City of Westminster, London
