= Pedro García Naranjo =

Peruvian Catholic Archbishop

Pedro Manuel García Naranjo
- 26th Archbishop of Lima
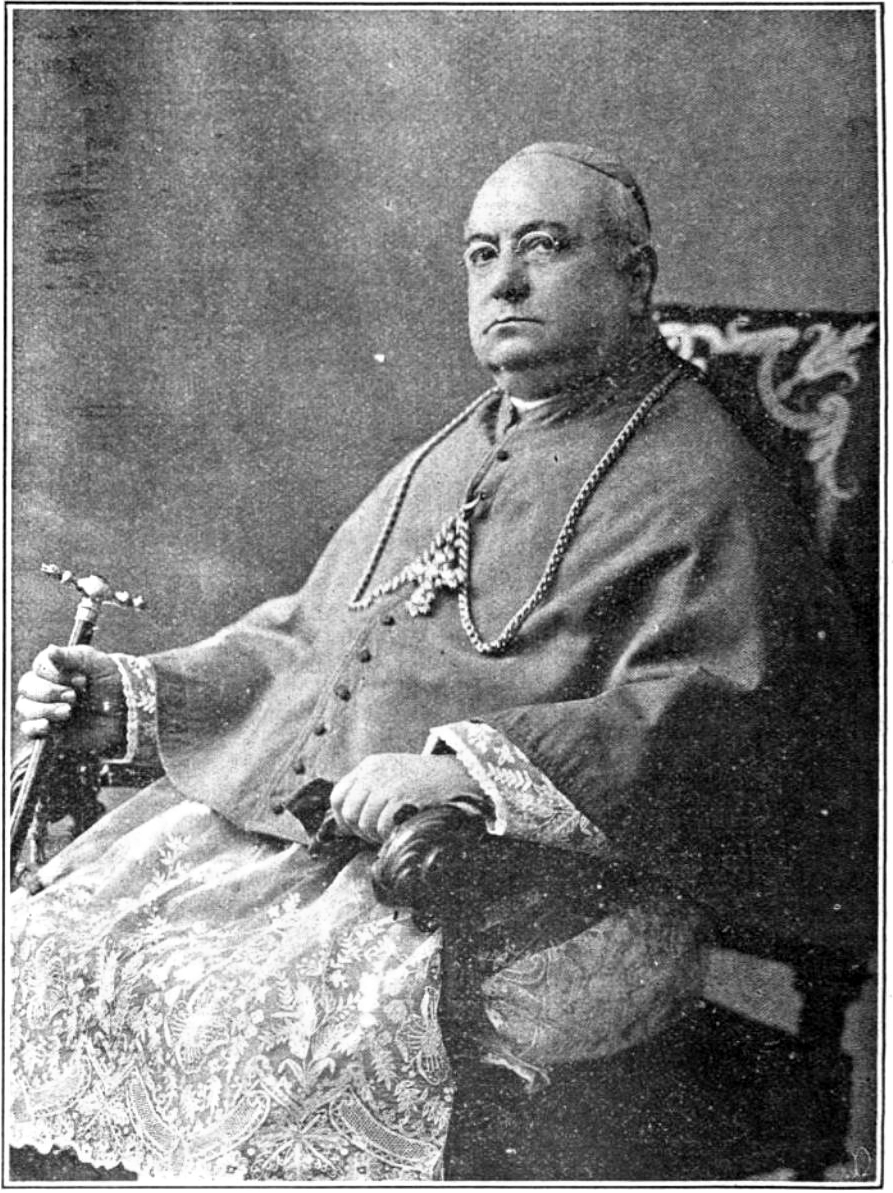
- Church: Catholic Church
- Installed: June 4, 1908
- Term ended: September 10, 1917
- Predecessor: Manuel Tovar y Chamorro
- Successor: Emilio Lissón Chávez

Orders
- Ordination: December 21, 1867 by José Sebastián de Goyeneche y Barreda, Archbishop of Lima
- Consecration: January 14, 1908 by Ángel María Dolci, Titular Archbishop of Nazianzus

Personal details
- Born: April 29, 1838 Lima, Peru
- Died: September 10, 1917 Barranco, Lima, Peru
- Occupation: Theologian, educator
- Education: Seminario Conciliar de Santo Toribio; Universidad Nacional Mayor de San Marcos

Pedro Manuel García Naranjo (April 29, 1838 – September 10, 1917) was a Peruvian Catholic priest who served as the 26th Archbishop of Lima from 1908 to 1917. As an educator, he placed special emphasis on improving priesthood education provided at the Seminary of Lima. Under his episcopate, the Pontifical Catholic University of Peru was founded in 1917.

== Life ==
Pedro Manuel was born on April 29, 1838, in Lima, Peru. He was the son of Manuel García and Manuela Naranjo, belonging to a distinguished Lima family.

He studied at the Seminario Conciliar de Santo Toribio de Lima, where he later served as a professor. For thirty years, he taught courses in Latin, Physics, Astronomy, Canon Law, Dogmatic Theology, and Moral Theology.

On July 15, 1868, he obtained a Doctorate in Theology from the National University of San Marcos, where he became a professor of Dogmatic Theology. He also served as dean there from 1883 to 1900.

== Career ==
=== Priesthood ===
He was ordained a priest on December 21, 1867, by Archbishop José Sebastián de Goyeneche y Barreda of Lima.

In 1883, he was appointed rector of the Seminario de Santo Toribio, where he managed and increased its revenues, paying off its debts. He remained in this position until 1899. He continued teaching at the University of San Marcos while he served as the rector of the seminary. He also served as apostolic visitor of the Trinity monastery and synodal examiner of the archdiocese. In 1891, he was appointed a canon of the Metropolitan Chapter of the Cathedral of Lima, and in 1894, he was promoted to treasurer.

== Episcopacy ==
On September 11, 1907, the President of Peru, José Pardo y Barreda, proposed him for the Archbishopric of Lima, which had become vacant due to the death of Archbishop Manuel Tovar y Chamorro. Pope Pius X recommended him on December 16, 1907. On January 14, 1908, he was consecrated by the Apostolic Delegate Ángel María Dolci, Titular Archbishop of Nacianzo.

=== Works ===
He focused his attention and care on the seminary and parish service. To supplement the shortage of secular clergy, he admitted the Regular Canons of the Immaculate Conception and the Sons of the Heart of Mary into the archdiocese. He built the Church of La Victoria and rebuilt the Church of Bellavista. He equipped the Catholic newspaper with modern machinery. The monasteries also benefited during his episcopate. He presided over a provincial council in 1912 and attended four episcopal assemblies held in 1909, 1911, 1915, and 1917.

In 1915, during the Second government of José Pardo, the Constitution of Peru was reformed, proclaiming freedom of worship, thus modifying the privileged situation that the Catholic Church had enjoyed until then. This historical reform unleashed a wave of attacks on the Church, mainly expressed in universities, especially the University of San Marcos, which was the only institution providing higher education in Lima at the time. This led the Catholic hierarchy to found a confessional university. Thus, the Pontifical Catholic University of Peru was born in 1917, and it was granted the status of Pontifical by the Holy See in 1942.

=== Death ===
He died after nine years of episcopal leadership. During that time, he did not conduct the pastoral visit to his archdiocese. He bequeathed his house in Lima to the diocesan seminary of Santo Toribio and his residence in Barranco to the Church of La Victoria. His remains were buried in the crypt of the Cathedral of Lima.
