= Diocese of Chosica =

Catholic diocese in Peru

Coordinates: 12.0333°S 77.0167°W

Diocese of Chosica Dioecesis Chosicana

Catholic
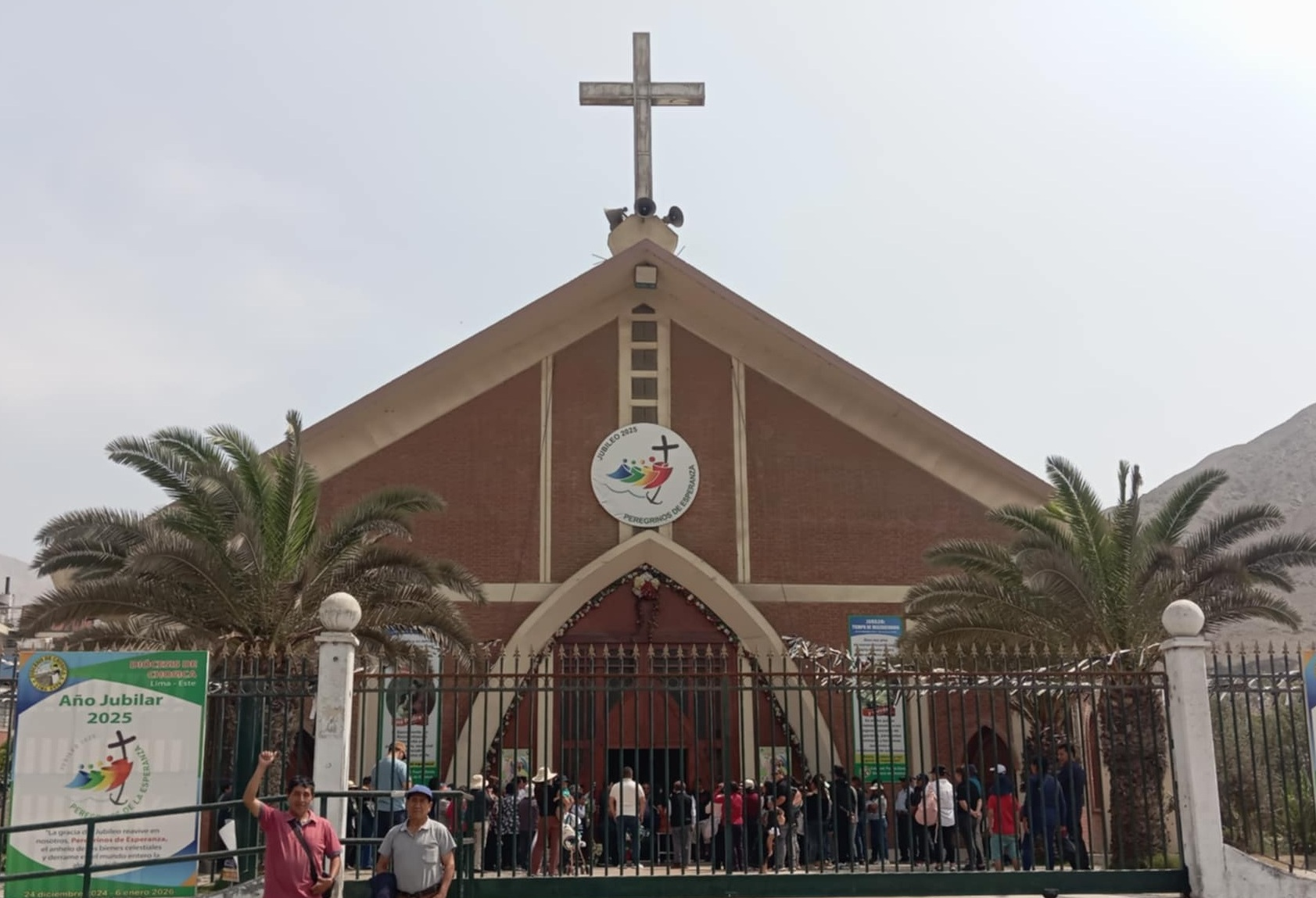
- Cathedral of Huaycán

Location
- Country: Peru
- Metropolitan: Lima

Statistics
- Area: 3,418 km^{2} (1,320 sq mi)
- Population: Total; Catholics: (as of 2023); 2,244,960; 1,914,000 (85.3%)
- Parishes: 31

Information
- Denomination: Catholic Church
- Sui iuris church: Latin Church
- Rite: Roman Rite
- Established: 14 December 1996; 29 years ago
- Cathedral: Catedral de Huaycán
- Secular priests: 122 (54 Diocesan, 68 Religious Orders)

Current leadership
- Pope: Leo XIV
- Bishop: Jorge Enrique Izaguirre Rafael, C.S.C.
- Metropolitan Archbishop: Carlos Castillo Mattasoglio
- Bishops emeritus: Norbert Klemens Strotmann Hoppe, M.S.C. Arthur Joseph Colgan, C.S.C.

The Diocese of Chosica (Latin: Chosicana) is a diocese located in the city of Chosica in the ecclesiastical province of Lima in Peru.

== History ==
- 14 December 1996: Established as Diocese of Chosica from the Metropolitan Archdiocese of Lima

== Bishops ==
=== Ordinaries ===
- Norbert Klemens Strotmann Hoppe, M.S.C. (11 January 1997 – 27 December 2023), retired
- Jorge Enrique Izaguirre Rafael, C.S.C. (27 December 2023 – Present)

=== Auxiliary bishop ===
- Arthur Joseph Colgan, C.S.C. (2015-2023), retired

== See also ==
- Catholic Church in Peru

== Sources ==
- GCatholic.org
- Catholic Hierarchy
- Diocese website
