= Manuel Tovar =

Manuel Tovar may refer to:

- Manuel Tovar y Chamorro (1844–1907), Peruvian prelate of the Roman Catholic Church
- Manuel Tovar (politician) (born 1974), Costa Rican politician
- Manuel Tovar (cartoonist) (1875–1935), Spanish cartoonist and caricaturist

== See also ==
- Manuel Felipe de Tovar (1803–1866), Venezuelan politician, president in 1859–1861
