= Carlos Castillo Mattasoglio =

Peruvian prelate of the Catholic Church

His Eminence Carlos Castillo Mattasoglio
- Cardinal; Archbishop of Lima
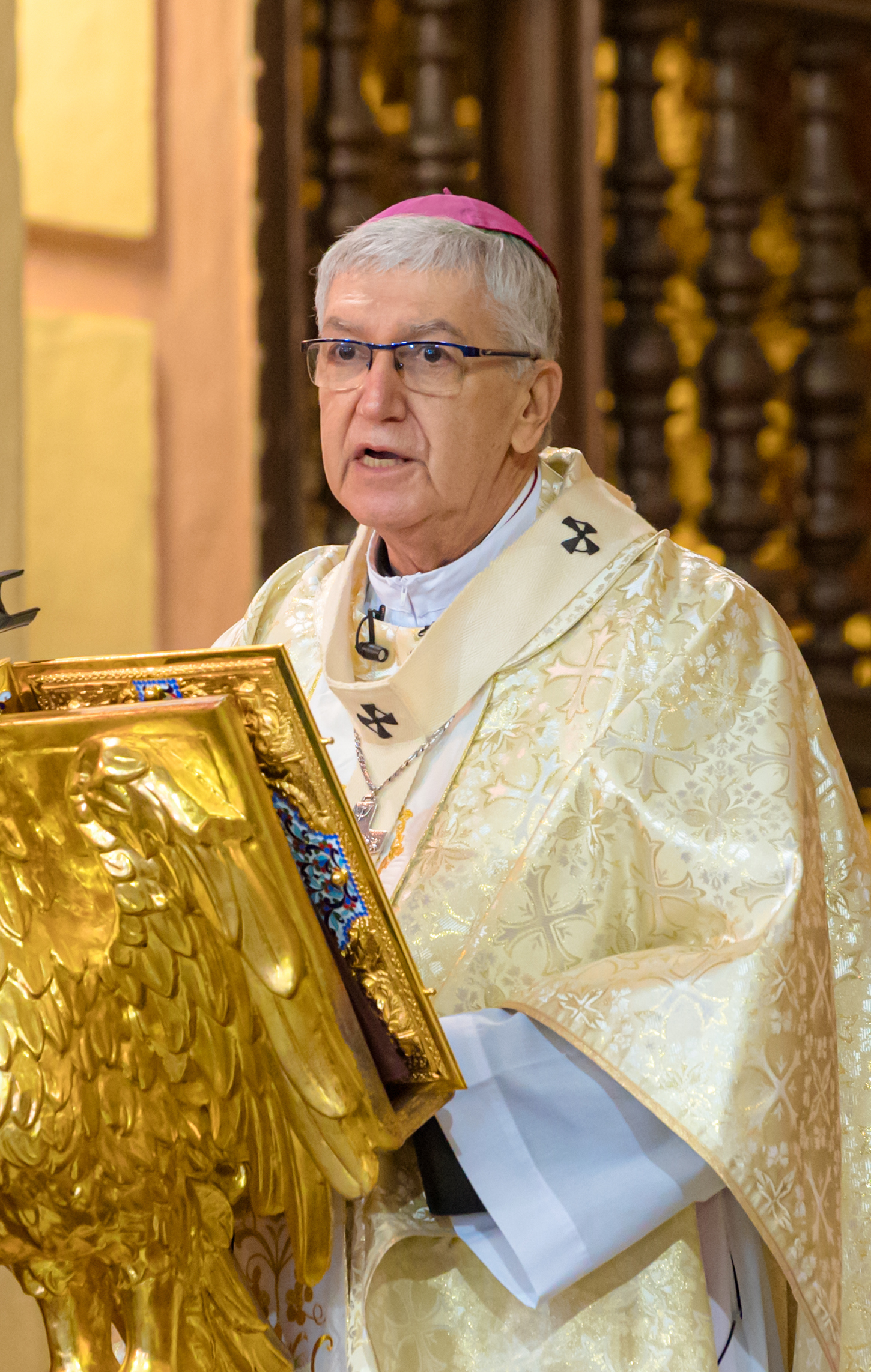
- Castillo in 2021
- Church: Catholic Church
- Archdiocese: Lima
- Appointed: 25 January 2019
- Installed: 2 March 2019
- Predecessor: Juan Luis Cipriani Thorne
- Other post: Cardinal-Priest of Santa Maria delle Grazie a Casal Boccone (2024–)

Orders
- Ordination: 15 July 1984 by Juan Landázuri Ricketts
- Consecration: 2 March 2019 by Nicola Girasoli
- Created cardinal: 7 December 2024 by Pope Francis
- Rank: Cardinal priest

Personal details
- Born: 28 February 1950 (age 76) Lima, Peru
- Education: Colegio San Agustín
- Alma mater: National University of San Marcos; Pontifical Gregorian University
- Coat of arms

Styles of Carlos Castillo Mattasoglio
- Reference style: His Eminence
- Spoken style: Your Eminence
- Informal style: Cardinal
- See: Lima

Carlos Gustavo Castillo Mattasoglio (born 28 February 1950) is a Peruvian prelate of the Catholic Church whom Pope Francis named Archbishop of Lima on 25 January 2019 and made a cardinal on 7 December 2024. From completing his training in theology in 1987 until his episcopal appointment, he devoted himself to both pastoral care and theological education in Peru.

== Early career ==
Carlos Castillo Mattasoglio was born in Lima on 28 February 1950. After attending the Dalton de Lince College and the San Agustín College of Lima, he studied at the National University of San Marcos from 1968 to 1973, earning a bachelor's degree in social sciences. At San Marcos, he joined the National Union of Catholic Students, led by Father Gustavo Gutiérrez, one of the principal voices in the Liberation Theology movement. He continued his studies at the Santo Toribio di Mogrovejo major seminary in Lima. At the Pontifical Gregorian University in Rome he earned a bachelor's degrees in philosophy in 1979 and in theology in 1983. He was ordained a priest for the Archdiocese of Lima on 15 July 1984 by Cardinal Juan Landázuri Ricketts. He obtained a licentiate and a doctorate in dogmatic theology in 1985 and 1987 at the Gregorian.

He returned to Peru in 1987. He was assessor of the National Union of Catholic Students from 1987 to 1998, the vicar of various parishes from 1987 to 1991, and then an associate in parish work from 1991 to 1999, and a vicar again from 1999 to 2015.

He has been a lecturer in Catholic theology at the Pontifical Catholic University of Peru since 1987. Castillo, along with every other faculty member at its Theology Department, was suspended by Cardinal Juan Luis Cipriani Thorne in 2013 amid a conflict between Cipriani and the university administration. After that, Castillo continued teaching courses in morals and Christian social thought. In 2016, the university's new Great Chancellor Cardinal Giuseppe Versaldi renewed the licenses to teach Catholic theology of Castillo and the other faculty.

He headed university pastoral care in Lima in the 1990s and held a variety of archdiocesan posts with responsibility for youth and vocational pastoral care from 1996 to 1999. On the national level, he was assessor of the Commission for Youth of the Peruvian Episcopal Conference from 1990 to 2001. He was director of relations with the Church and a member of the University Council of the Pontifical Catholic University of Peru from 2003 to 2006.

== Archbishop ==
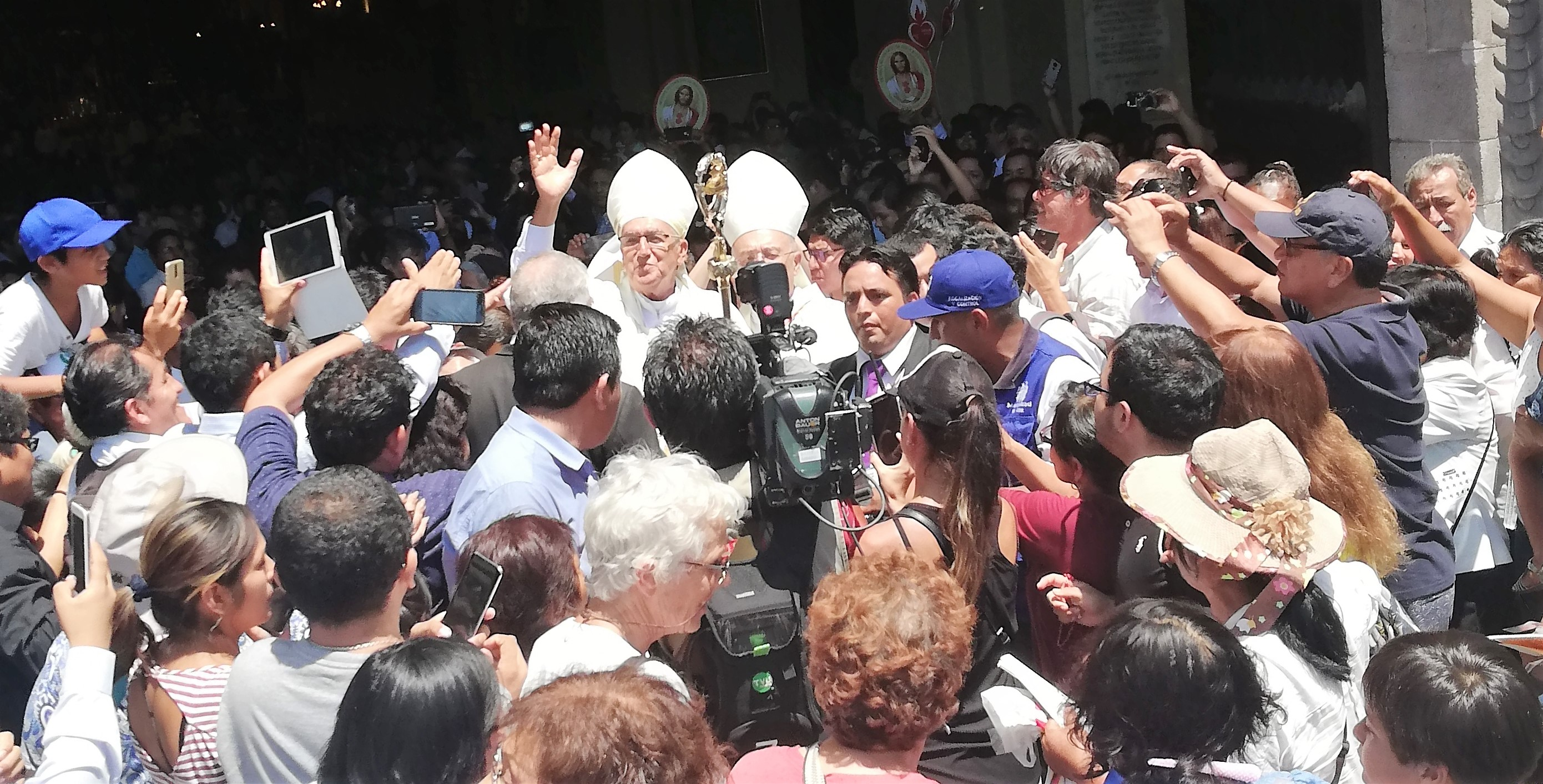
Mattasoglio during his installation as Archbishop of Lima on 2 March 2019.

Pope Francis named him to succeed Juan Luis Cipriani Thorne as Archbishop of Lima on 25 January 2019. As Archbishop he is ex officio Grand Chancellor of the Faculty of Civil and Canon Theology of Lima. When named archbishop, he was a lecturer in theology–a position he had held since 1987–and assessor of the Center for University Pastoral Assistance at the Pontifical Catholic University of Peru. He also assisted in parish work at Church of San Francisco Solano. In addition to Spanish, he speaks Italian and French. At the press conference announcing his appointment, he received from his friend, Luis Bambarén, Bishop Emeritus of Chimbote, the crozier that belonged to Cardinal Landázuri, who ordained him.

Cipriani said Castillo's appointment should not be interpreted politically as an expression of support for the Pontifical University or liberation theology, or disrespect for Opus Dei, and said such interpretations viewed prelates as "neighborhood brawlers" rather than viewing the appointment of a bishop as a deep and spiritual event. But Austen Ivereigh called it "an ecclesial earthquake". Without naming Cipriani, Cardinal Pedro Barreto said Castillo's appointment "brings the Peruvian conference of bishops much closer to the reality of the church of which we all dream, a church that is poor and for the poor, a church that reaches out, a church that is closer to those who are suffering now." John L. Allen Jr., citing the differences between Cipriani and Castillo on liberation theology and the Pontifical University, wrote that "it's still fairly unusual to see a cardinal's legacy disassembled in real time quite like this".

Castillo's consecration and installation ceremony was held on 2 March 2019. He was consecrated by the apostolic nuncio to Peru Archbishop Nicola Girasoli, with Cardinals Cipriani and Barreto, Archbishop Héctor Miguel Cabrejos Vidarte and Bishop Luis Bambarén Gastelumendi serving as co-consecrators. During the ceremony the liberation theologian, Gustavo Gutiérrez, speaking as representative of the church of Lima, formally called upon the papal nuncio to ordain Mattasoglio as bishop.

According to Edgar Beltrán writing in the Pillar, among the Peruvian bishops, Castillo was a leading opponent of then bishop of Chiclayo Robert Prevost, reportedly telling his colleagues that "a yankee couldn't become a president of the bishops' conference."

On 6 October 2024, Pope Francis announced that he planned to make Castillo a cardinal on 8 December, a date that was later changed to 7 December. During the December 2024 Consistory, Pope Francis made him a cardinal and appointed him cardinal-priest of Santa Maria delle Grazie a Casal Boccone. He participated as a cardinal elector in the 2025 papal conclave that elected Pope Leo XIV.

== Selected writings ==
His principal works include:

- Castillo Mattasoglio, Carlos (1993). Libres para creer. La conversión según Bartolomé de las Casas en la Historia de las Indias [Free to believe. Conversion according to Fr. Bartolomé de las Casas' History of the Indies] (in Spanish). Pontificia Universidad Católica del Perú. doi:10.18800/9788489390652. ISBN 978-84-89390-65-2. (Edited version of his doctoral disseration)
- Teologia della rigenerazione, EMI, 2001.
- La opción por los jóvenes en Aparecida, CEP-IPADEJ-IBC, 2008.
- Joven, a ti te digo ¡levántate!, 2009.
- Caminando en el amor. El pastor de una Iglesia viva. Homenaje al cardenal Juan Landázuri Ricketts en el centenario de su nacimiento (editor), Fondo Editorial PUCP, 2014.

== See also ==
- Catholic Church in Peru
- Cardinals created by Pope Francis
