= Pablo Muñoz Vega =

Ecuadorian Cardinal and prelate

Servant of God Pablo Muñoz Vega SJ
- Archbishop Emeritus of Quito
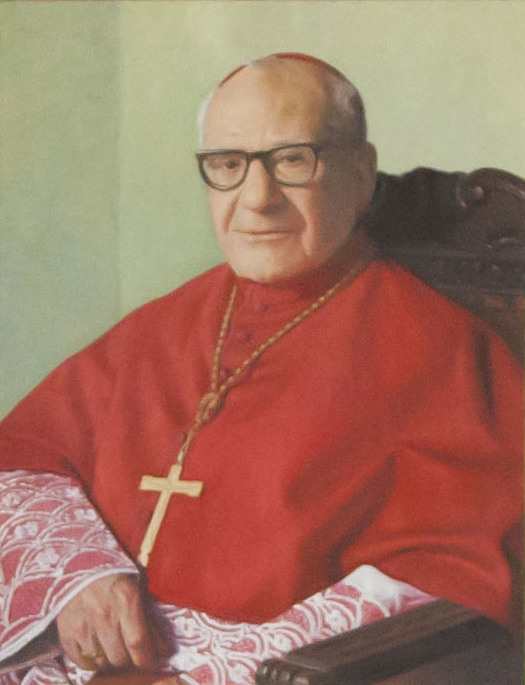
- Church: Roman Catholic Church
- Archdiocese: Quito
- See: Quito
- Appointed: 23 June 1967
- Term ended: 1 June 1985
- Predecessor: Carlos María Javier de la Torre
- Successor: Antonio José González Zumárraga
- Other post: Cardinal-Priest of San Roberto Bellarmino (1969-94)
- Previous posts: Rector Magnificus of the Pontifical Gregorian University (1957-63); Titular Bishop of Ceramus (1964-67); Coadjutor Archbishop of Quito (1964-67); First Vice-President of the Latin American Episcopal Conference (1965-69); President of the Ecuadorian Episcopal Conference (1969-73); President of the Ecuadorian Episcopal Conference (1975-84)

Orders
- Ordination: 25 July 1933
- Consecration: 19 March 1964 by Carlo Confalonieri
- Created cardinal: 28 April 1969 by Pope Paul VI
- Rank: Cardinal-Priest

Personal details
- Born: Pablo Muñoz Vega; 23 May 1903 Mira, Tulcán, Ecuador
- Died: 3 June 1994 (aged 91) Quito, Ecuador
- Buried: Cathedral of Quito, Ecuador
- Education: Colegio Maximo de Oña; Pontifical Gregorian University
- Motto: Aeterna veritas vera caritas ("True love is eternal truth")
- Coat of arms: Pablo Muñoz Vega's coat of arms

Styles of Pablo Muñoz Vega
- Reference style: His Eminence
- Spoken style: Your Eminence
- Informal style: Cardinal
- See: Quito

Ordination history of Pablo Muñoz Vega
History
Diaconal ordination
- Date: 1933
- Place: Rome, Kingdom of Italy
Priestly ordination
- Date: 25 July 1933
- Place: Sant'Ignazio Church, Rome, Kingdom of Italy
Episcopal consecration
- Principal consecrator: Carlo Confalonieri
- Co-consecrators: Antonio Samorè; Martin John O'Connor
- Date: 19 March 1964
- Place: Rome, Italy
Cardinalate
- Elevated by: Pope Paul VI
- Date: 29 April 1969
Episcopal succession
Bishops consecrated by Pablo Muñoz Vega as principal consecrator
- Antonio José González Zumárraga: 15 June 1969
- Juan Ignacio Larrea Holguín: 15 June 1969
- Raúl Eduardo Vela Chiriboga: 21 May 1972
- Tomás Angel Romero Gross, OP: 15 August 1973
- Luis Alberto Luna Tobar, OCD: 18 September 1977
- Luis Enrique Orellana Ricaurte, SJ: 9 April 1978
- Luis Oswaldo Pérez Calderón: 25 November 1984

Pablo Muñoz Vega, SJ (23 May 1903 – 3 June 1994) was an Ecuadorian Catholic prelate who served as Archbishop of Quito from 1967 until his resignation in 1985. He was a member of the Jesuits and was made a cardinal in 1969.

His cause of canonization commenced on 9 April 2016 after the Congregation for the Causes of Saints granted their formal approval of the cause on 10 December 2015; this gives him the title Servant of God.

== Life ==
Pablo Muñoz Vega was born in Mira on 23 May 1903 as the fourth child to Antonio Salustiano Muñoz Carrera and Josefa Vega. He was baptized on 24 May as "Segundo Pablo Mordoqueo".

He joined the Jesuits on 27 September 1918 (beginning his novitiate on 26 November 1918) and studied at the Jesuit houses for studies in Quito (such as the San Ignacio school in Cotocollao in 1915) and in 1922 obtained a bachelor's degree in humanities. He later studied from 1929 to 1930 in Belgium and then was transferred to Burgos in Spain at the Colegio Maximo de Oña; he also studied in Rome at the Pontifical Gregorian since September 1932. He studied humanities as well as Latin and Greek and obtained a degree from College Maximo San Ignacio in Quito in 1927 and then a doctorate from Facultad Teologia at the school of Oña in 1931. He acquired his doctorate in 1937 and was titled "Magister Aggregatus". Vega made his initial profession on 27 February 1920. Vega later taught at Cotocollao and later at the Jesuit school of San Felipe Neri in Riobamba from 1926 until 1928 and he began developing an interest and focus in the works of Saint Augustine who would become the basis for some of his spiritual writings.

Vega was ordained to the priesthood in 1933 in the Sant'Ignazio Church in Rome and commenced further studies there from 1933 until 1937. Once he completed his studies he served as a staff member in the philosophical department at the Gregorian from 1937 until 1949 at which point he was appointed as the Jesuit provincial for Ecuador later in 1958; he held that post until 1964. Vega also served as an expert at the Second Vatican Council in 1962 at the council's first session and would later then participate as a bishop in the second and third sessions of the council. He also served as the rector of the Pontifical Pio-Latin American College in Rome from 1955 until 1958 and served as the Rector Magnificus of the Pontifical Gregorian from 1958 until 1963.

Pope Paul VI appointed him as the Titular Archbishop of Ceramus (with the rank pro hac vice of archbishop since it was a titular see and not a titular archbishopric) and as the Coadjutor Archbishop "sedis datus" for the Quito archdiocese in 1964. He received his episcopal consecration on 19 March 1964 in Rome from Cardinal Carlo Confalonieri. He succeeded to the metropolitan see of Quito on 23 June 1967 after serving as its coadjutor which meant that he had the right of succession in that role.

He attended the final two sessions of the Second Vatican Council as a bishop from 1964 until 1965. He attended the 1967 gathering of bishops in Rome from 29 September to 29 October and also became the President of the Ecuadorian Episcopal Conference; he had two terms from 1969 to 1973 and then 1975 to 1984. He attended several other episcopal gatherings in Rome spanning the next decade.

Vega was made the Cardinal-Priest of San Roberto Bellarmino on 28 April 1969 and received his title on 30 April from Paul VI. He participated in the first conclave in 1978 that elected Pope John Paul I and the following conclave that October that saw the election of Pope John Paul II. In his role as a cardinal he was a member of both the Congregation for Catholic Education and the Congregation for Institutes of Consecrated Life and Societies of Apostolic Life.

In 1979 he attended the Third General Conference of the Latin American Episcopate in Puebla in Mexico and attended a gathering of the College of Cardinals from 5–9 November 1979. He lost the right to vote in conclaves after he turned 80 in 1983. He resigned from the pastoral governance of the archdiocese in 1985 as was a requirement of canon law. Vega also attended his last conference of the Latin American Episcopate in the Dominican Republic from 12 to 28 October 1992.

He died in his old see on 3 June 1994 and is buried in the archdiocesan cathedral.

== Beatification process ==
On 21 February 2013 a formal request for the beatification process was lodged to the Congregation for the Causes of Saints in Rome. The C.C.S. granted their formal approval to the cause on 10 December 2015 with the declaration of "nihil obstat" (nothing against) to the cause. The diocesan process commenced on 9 April 2016 in Quito.

Catholic Church titles
| Preceded by Pedro María Abellán, SJ | Rector Magnificus of the Pontifical Gregorian University; 1957-1963 | Succeeded by Edoard Dhanis, SJ |
| Preceded by Camille-Paul Stappers, OFM | Titular Bishop of Ceramus; 7 February 1964-23 June 1967 | Succeeded by Fortino Gómez León |
| Preceded by Manuel Larraín Errázuriz | First Vice-President of the Latin American Episcopal Conference; 1965-1969 | Succeeded by Marcos Gregorio McGrath, CSC |
| Preceded by Carlos Maria de la Torre | Archbishop of Quito; 23 June 1967-1 June 1985 | Succeeded by Antonio José González Zumárraga |
| Preceded by Cesar Antonio Mosquera Corral | President of the Ecuadorian Episcopal Conference; 1969-1973 | Succeeded by Bernardino Echeverría Ruiz, OFM |
| Preceded by None; title elevated | Cardinal-Priest of San Roberto Bellarmino; 30 April 1969-3 June 1994 | Succeeded by Augusto Vargas Alzamora, SJ |
| Preceded by Bernardino Echevvería Ruiz, OFM | President of the Ecuadorian Episcopal Conference; 1975-1984 | Succeeded by Bernardino Echeverría Ruiz, OFM |
