= Diocese of Chimbote =

Roman Catholic diocese in Peru

Coordinates: 12.0333°S 77.1333°W

Diocese of Chimbote Dioecesis Cimbotiensis Diócesis de Chimbote

Catholic
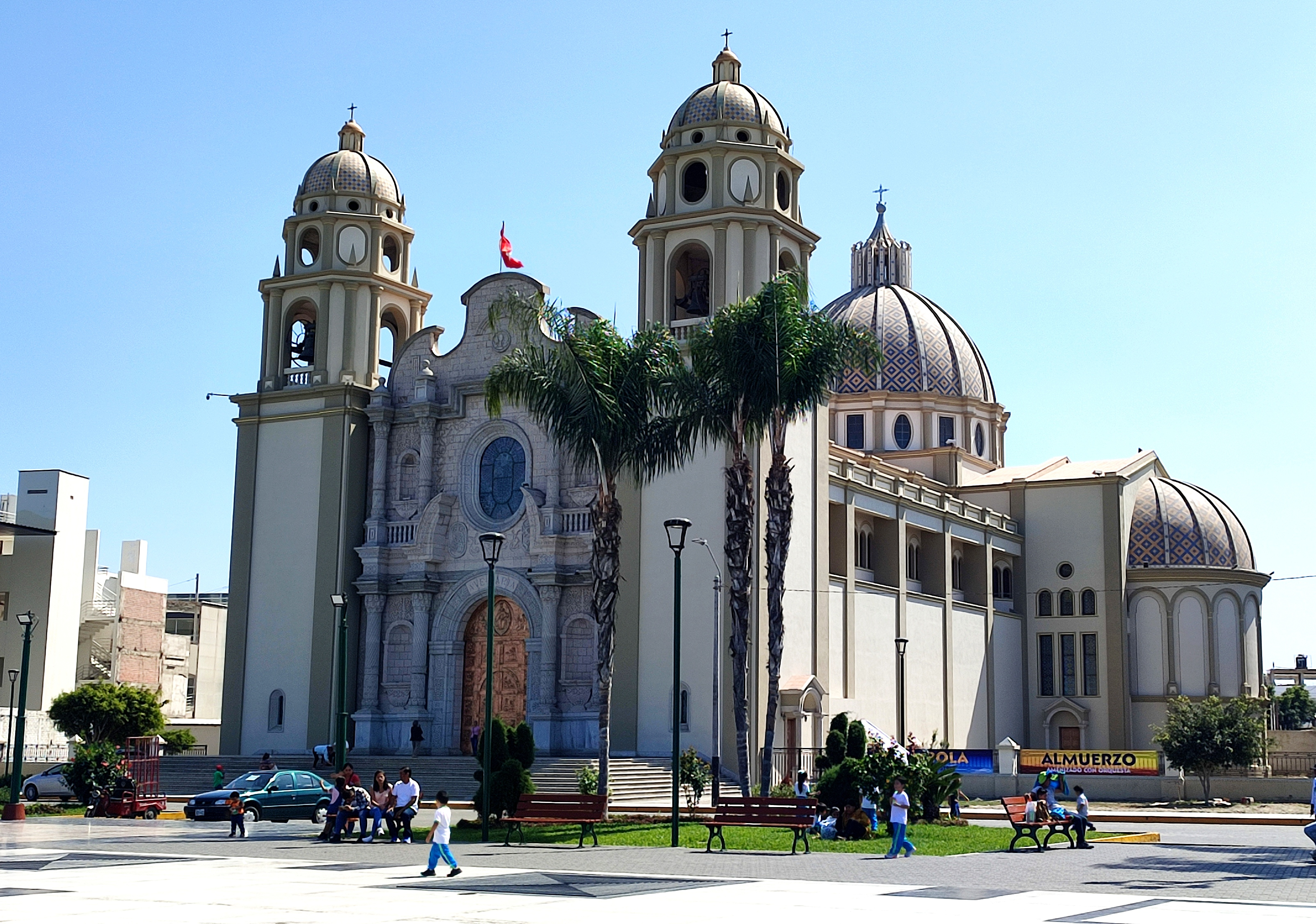
- Catedral Nuestra Señora del Carmen y San Pedro

Location
- Country: Peru
- Metropolitan: Archdiocese of Trujillo
- Headquarters: Chimbote, Department of Ancash, Peru

Statistics
- Area: 23,500 km^{2} (9,100 sq mi)
- Population: Total; Catholics: (as of 2023); 739,000; 649,000 (87.8%)
- Parishes: 52

Information
- Denomination: Catholic Church
- Sui iuris church: Latin Church
- Rite: Roman Rite
- Established: 26 November 1962; 63 years ago
- Cathedral: Catedral Nuestra Señora del Carmen y San Pedro (Cathedral of Our Lady of Mount Carmel and St. Peter)
- Patron saint: Saint Peter & Our Lady of Mount Carmel
- Secular priests: 67 (56 Diocesan, 11 Religious Orders)

Current leadership
- Pope: Leo XIV
- Bishop: Ángel Zapata Bances, O.C.D.
- Metropolitan Archbishop: Gilberto Alfredo Vizcarra Mori SJ
- Bishops emeritus: Ángel Simón Piorno

Map

Website
- www.obispadodechimbote.org

The Roman Catholic Diocese of Chimbote (Latin: Cimbotien(sis)) is a diocese located in the city of Chimbote in the ecclesiastical province of Trujillo in Peru.

== History ==
On 26 November 1962 Pope John XXIII established the Territorial Prelature of Chimbote. It was promoted to the Diocese of Chimbote by Pope John Paul II on 6 April 1983.

== Leadership ==
=== Prelates of Chimbote ===
- James Burke, O.P. (8 March 1965 – 2 June 1978), resigned
- Luis Armando Bambarén Gastelumendi, S.J. (2 June 1978 – 6 April 1983 see below)

=== Bishops of Chimbote ===
- Luis Armando Bambarén Gastelumendi, S.J. (see above 6 April 1983 – 4 February 2004), retired
- Ángel Simón Piorno (4 February 2004 – 18 May 2022), retired
- Ángel Zapata Bances, O.C.D. (18 May 2022 – Present)

== See also ==
- Roman Catholicism in Peru
