= Luis Armando Bambarén Gastelumendi =

Peruvian priest (1928–2021)

His Eminence Luis Armando Bambarén Gastelumendi
- Bishop of Chimbote
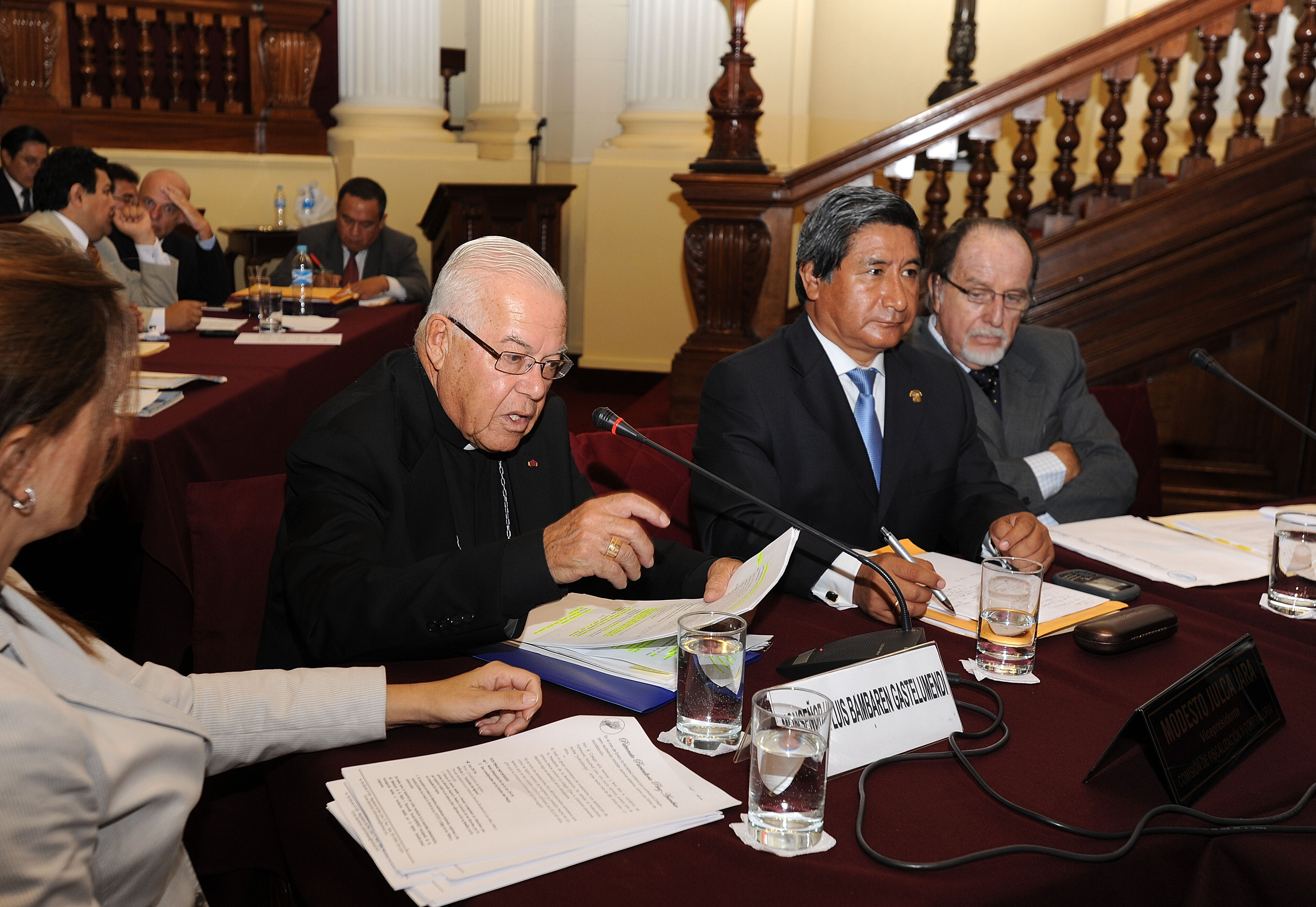
- Church: Roman Catholic Church
- Appointed: 1 December 1967
- Installed: 2 June 1978
- Term ended: 4 February 2004
- Predecessor: James Edward Charles Burke
- Successor: Ángel Francisco Simón Piorno
- Other post: Auxiliary Bishop of Lima

Orders
- Ordination: 15 July 1958
- Consecration: 7 January 1968

Personal details
- Born: 14 January 1928 Yungay, Department of Ancash, Peru
- Died: 19 March 2021 (aged 93) Lima, Peru

Luis Armando Bambarén Gastelumendi, SJ (14 January 1928 – 19 March 2021) was a Peruvian Roman Catholic Bishop of Chimbote from 1967 till his retirement in 2004 and former president of the Peruvian Episcopal Conference.

== Early life ==
He was born on January 14, 1928, in the Ancash city of Yungay, in a deeply Catholic home made up of his parents Alfredo and Luisa. Bambarén was the fifth of eight siblings, two of whom were also religious. He completed his primary studies in his hometown, and secondary at the Colegio de la Inmaculada in Lima.

Bambarén began his religious life in the Jesuit novitiate on April 20, 1944, following studies of letters until he left for Spain in 1949 to study philosophy. Then he practiced teaching in Lima from 1952 to 1955, continuing his studies at the Faculty of Theology of Granada in Spain.

== Priesthood ==
Bambarén was ordained a priest of the Catholic Church in the city of Madrid on July 15, 1958, and his first mass coincided with the feast of the Virgen del Carmen, on July 16 of the same year. He completed his priestly training in Mexico and Colombia between 1959 and 1961. Upon his return to Peru he taught, being deputy director of the Colegio de la Inmaculada de Lima between 1961 and 1964, then he was appointed rector of the Colegio San Ignacio de Loyola de Piura in 1965, where he founded the Loyola Institute of Agricultural Mechanics and Industry.

== Episcopate ==
On January 7, 1968, Bambarén received the episcopal consecration as Titular Bishop of Sertei and Auxiliary Bishop of Lima from the then Cardinal Juan Landázuri Ricketts in the San Martín de Porres parish. He immediately surrendered to the defense of poor people, and the area where they live he called Pueblo Joven. In 1970, due to the earthquake that destroyed a large part of the department of Ancash on May 31, he was appointed a member of the committee for the reconstruction and rehabilitation of the affected areas. In May 1971, Bambarén boldly defended the right to housing of thousands of land occupants in Pamplona, in Lima, who after sustaining a confrontation with the Civil Guard and Police on May 4, they were relocated to sandy deserts in the south of the city on May 16, giving birth to the current District of Villa El Salvador; his support for these settlers led to their arrest, which was publicly rectified by the head of the military government junta, General Juan Velasco Alvarado, before the citizen protest, proceeding to remove the then Minister of the Interior, General Armando Artola Azcárate. In addition, Bambarén is recognized by the nickname of "Bishop of the young towns."

Appointed Bishop of Chimbote on June 8, 1978, he assumed office on July 25 of the same year. Bambarén served in this bishopric until 2003, the year he turned 75, when he retired. Faced with an imminent institutional crisis, he advised President Alejandro Toledo to recognize his daughter Saraí, a lady from Piura.

He presented for their beatification the Polish martyrs killed by the Shining Path: Miguel Tomaszeck, Zbigniew Strzalkowski, priests of the Krakow Province, and Alejandro Dordi, priest of the diocesan clergy of Bergamo.

== Peruvian Episcopal Conference ==
Between 1996 and 1997 Bambarén was Secretary of the Peruvian Episcopal Conference and also President of the Social Communication Commission of the Episcopate (Conamcos). In February 1998 he was elected president, replacing Monsignor Augusto Vargas Alzamora, and reelected in 2000.

In 2011 he was criticized for referring to homosexuals as "queers", but days later rectified.

== Death ==
Monsignor Bambarén died at the age of 93 during the COVID-19 pandemic in Peru.
