= Busiri Vici =

French-Italian architect family

Busiri Vici was long-flourishing dynasty of French-Italian architects formed by the union of the French Beausire family with the Vici family of Arcevia.

The progenitor of the French side of the dynasty was Jean Beausire (1651–1743), whose descendants thrived as architects under the Ancien Régime. On the Italian side, Andrea Vici (1743–1817) was a second-generation architect who gained regard for his work under Luigi Vanvitelli on the Palace of Caserta and later gained Vatican patronage. Andrea's daughter Barbara Vici married Beausire's descendant Giulio Cesare Busiri (1792–1818) in 1815, joining the two families as Busiri Vici.

Noted members of the family include Andrea Busiri Vici (1818–1911); Clemente Busiri Vici (1887–1965), who designed churches for Pope Pius XI such Gran Madre di Dio and San Roberto Bellarmino, both in Rome; Clemente's brother Michele Busiri Vici (1894–1981) worked in Costa Smeralda, Sardinia; another brother, Andrea Busiri Vici (1903–1989), was a celebrated architect, art critic and scholar who worked with his brother Clemente on San Roberto Bellarmino.
