= Norbert Klemens Strotmann Hoppe =

German Roman Catholic bishop

Norbert Klemens Strotmann Hoppe M.S.C.
- Bishop Emeritus of Chosica
- Church: Catholic Church
- Diocese: Diocese of Chosica
- In office: 11 January 1997 – 27 December 2023
- Predecessor: Diocese erected
- Successor: Jorge Enrique Izaguirre Rafael
- Previous posts: Titular Bishop of Caere (1992-1997); Auxiliary Bishop of Lima (1992-1997)

Orders
- Ordination: 3 November 1973 by Luis Armando Bambarén Gastelumendi
- Consecration: 6 January 1993 by Pope John Paul II

Personal details
- Born: 14 August 1946 (age 80) Riesenbeck (in southern Hörstel), Province of Westphalia, British Occupation Zone, Allied-occupied Germany
- Motto: Fides Per Caritatem
- Coat of arms

Norbert Klemens Strotmann Hoppe (born 14 August 1946 in Riesenbeck-Hörstel) is a Roman Catholic bishop.

Strotmann Hoppe was born in Germany and was ordained to the priesthood in 1973. He served as auxiliary bishop of the Roman Catholic Archdiocese of Lima, Peru, from 1992 to 1997. He served as bishop of the Roman Catholic Diocese of Chosica from 1997 to 2023.
