= José María Carpenter Aponte =

Peruvian prelate

The Most Reverend José María Carpenter Aponte
- Auxiliary Bishop of Lima; Titular Bishop of Lorea
- Appointed: 4 June 1891

Orders
- Ordination: 11 July 1869
- Consecration: 8 October 1891 by Archbishop José Macchi; Co: Bishop Manuel Santiago Medina y Bañon; Bishop Ismaele Puirredón

Personal details
- Born: 4 May 1830 Arequipa, Arequipa, Peru
- Died: 3 June 1905 (aged 75) Lima, Peru

José María Carpenter Aponte (4 May 1830 – 3 June 1905) was a Peruvian prelate of the Roman Catholic Church. He served as Auxiliary Bishop of Lima, Peru from 1891 until his death in 1905.

== Biography ==
Carpenter Aponte was born on 4 May 1830 in Arequipa, Peru. He was ordained a deacon on 4 July 1869, and was ordained a priest on 11 July 1869.

On 4 June 1891 he was appointed Auxiliary Bishop of the Archdiocese of Lima and Titular Bishop of Lorea. He was consecrated a bishop on 8 October 1891. He was the principal consecrator of Bishop Manuel Segundo Ballón Manrique in 1897, and co-cosecrator of Bishops Fidel Olivas Escudero, Ezechiel Francisco Soto, and Mariano Emilio Holguin y Maldonado, in 1900, 1901, and 1904, respectively.

He died on 3 June 1905, at the age of 75.
