= Pedro Pascual Farfán =

Peruvian Catholic prelate (1870–1945)

- Archbishop of Lima
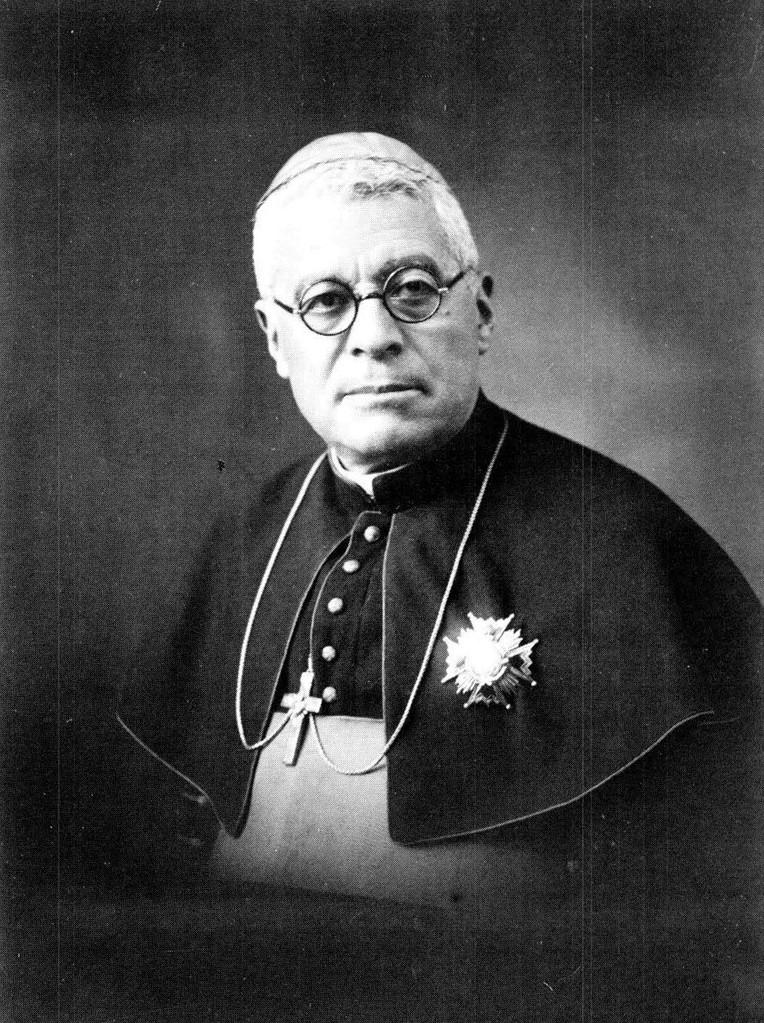
- Church: Catholic Church
- Archdiocese: Cuzco, Lima
- Installed: 1933
- Term ended: 1945
- Predecessor: Emilio Lissón
- Successor: Juan Guevara
- Other posts: Bishop of Cuzco and Huaraz, Military Ordinariate of Peru

Orders
- Ordination: December 29, 1894

Personal details
- Born: October 23, 1870 Cuzco, Peru
- Died: September 17, 1945 (aged 74) Lima, Peru
- Denomination: Roman Catholicism
- Education: Saint Anthony the Abbot Seminary
- Coat of arms

Pedro Pascual Francisco Farfán de los Godos (October 23, 1870 – September 17, 1945) was a Peruvian prelate of the Catholic Church who served as the 28th Archbishop of Lima from 1933 to his death in 1945. Additionally, he also served as Bishop of Cuzco from 1918 to 1933.

== Biography ==
Farfán was born on September 23, 1870, in the city of Cuzco, the son of parents Máximo Farfán de los Godos and Antonia Pascual. He studied at Saint Anthony the Abbot Seminary, where he started his religious career in 1886, teaching from 1890 onwards. He received his orders on December 29, 1893, serving as priest in the Church of Bethelehem. In 1896, he became vicerector of his alma mater and canon of the Diocesan Cabildo of Cuzco. During this period, he wrote his works Glorias del Seminario, Vida de la Santísima Virgen María and Vida de Juan Rodríguez de Rivera.

In 1907, he became Bishop of Huaraz, being consecrated at Santo Domingo Church in Lima on December 15 of the same year. He thoroughly visited the territory under his jurisdiction until he was sent to Cuzco in 1918, where he actively served as bishop of the city until 1933. During his tenure, he was invited to a dinner by then president José Pardo y Barreda.

In 1943, he received the titles of Primate of Peru and that of General Military Vicar, dying on November 17, 1945. Prior to his death, he was also given the honorary title of "Grand Chancellor of the Pontifical Catholic University of Peru."

== See also ==
- Roman Catholic Archdiocese of Lima
- Roman Catholic Archdiocese of Cuzco
