= Manuel Tovar y Chamorro =

Peruvian Catholic Archbishop

- 25th Archbishop of Lima
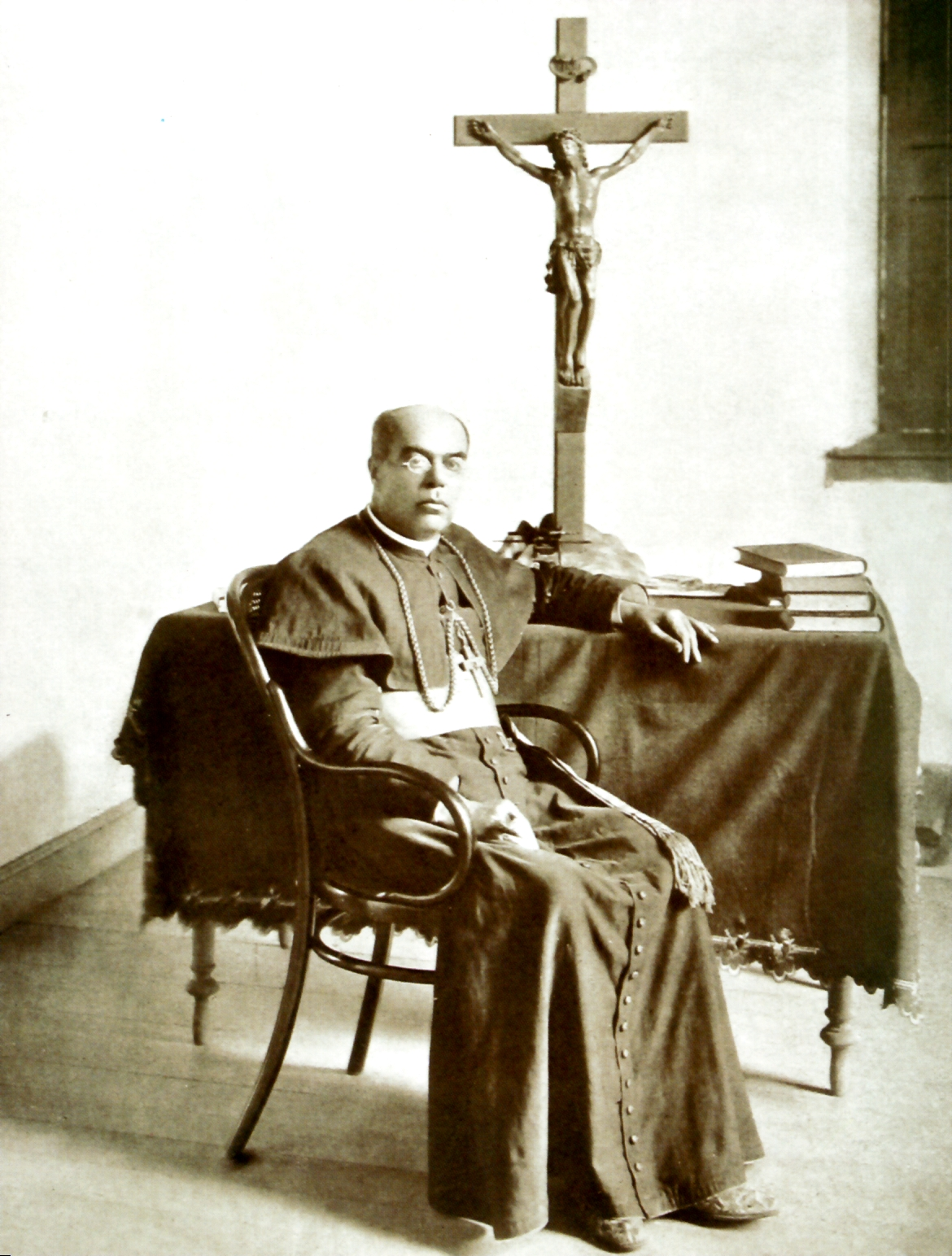
- Church: Roman Catholic Church
- Installed: December 8, 1898
- Term ended: May 25, 1907
- Predecessor: Manuel Antonio Bandini
- Successor: Pedro García Naranjo
- Other post: Titular Bishop of Marcópolis

Orders
- Ordination: September 22, 1866
- Consecration: September 6, 1891 by Giuseppe Macchi

Personal details
- Born: May 20, 1844 Sayán District, Peru
- Died: May 25, 1907 (aged 63) Tarma, Peru
- Education: Seminario Conciliar de Santo Toribio
- Motto: Ave maris stella

Manuel Tovar y Chamorro

Senator of the Republic of Peru for Ancash
- In office July 28, 1892 – October 25, 1894

Minister of Justice and Worship of Peru
- In office March 14, 1885 – December 2, 1885

Constituent Deputy of the Republic of Peru for Lima, Lima Department
- In office December 3, 1885 – June 3, 1886
- President: Miguel Iglesias
- Preceded by: Mariano Castro Zaldívar
- Succeeded by: Himself
- In office March 1, 1884 – May 2, 1885
- President: Antonio Arenas
- Preceded by: Himself
- Succeeded by: Juan Francisco Pazos Monasí

Manuel Tovar y Chamorro (Sayán, May 20, 1844 – Tarma, May 25, 1907) was a Peruvian priest and the 25th Archbishop of Lima, from 1898 to 1907. He was also a professor, writer, journalist, and orator; deputy for Lima, Ministry of Justice and Human Rights (Peru), Worship and Instruction, and corresponding member of the Royal Spanish Academy. He stood out as a great polemicist in defense of the rights of the Church and the prerogatives of the Catholic worship.

== Biography ==
Manuel Tovar was born in Sayán on May 20, 1844. He was the son of Ángel Tovar Giraldez and Manuela Chamorro Mesinas. He studied at the Seminario Conciliar de Santo Toribio, as a scholarship student. He received the gold medal for best student in 1860 and graduated as a teacher at the age of seventeen.

He received the tonsure and Minor Orders in 1862, subdiaconate in 1865, and diaconate in 1866.

=== Renowned Polemicist ===
He was an editor of the Catholic newspaper El Bien Público, quickly standing out for his polemical skills. His opinions in defense of the interests of the Catholic Church attracted criticism from anti-clerical sectors linked to political power. Another editor of that newspaper was the priest José Antonio Roca y Boloña, and together with him, Tovar initiated a campaign in protest against certain regulations of the Municipality of Lima, which attempted to regulate and restrict the ringing of church bells on certain occasions. In response, the dictatorship of Mariano Ignacio Prado imprisoned the two priests and transferred them to a warship. Fortunately, this "bell dispute" was resolved through the intervention of the Archbishop of Lima, and the prisoners were released (1866).

Sent to Rome, he received Major Orders in the Basilica of St. John Lateran in 1866. He returned to Peru, and from 1870 to 1889 he was an editor of La Sociedad, a Catholic newspaper in Lima, where his letters to the liberal clergyman Francisco de Paula González Vigil became famous, on the occasion of the occupation of Rome in 1870.

He was a professor at the Seminario de Santo Toribio, of which he was appointed rector in 1880. He was also a member of the Metropolitan Choir, joining in 1871 as a theological canon; he later became treasurer, maestrescuela, and dean.

=== Work during the War with Chile ===
During the War of the Pacific, he encouraged the patriotism of the Peruvians, alongside Archbishop Francisco Orueta y Castrillón and other notable figures of the Peruvian clergy. He remained rector of the Seminary, which he saved from looting by Chilean troops, thus being able to continue his academic work.

After the war, he delivered an eloquent Funeral Oration during the religious services held in homage to the Peruvian soldiers who fell in the defense of Lima. This ceremony took place on January 15, 1884, at the church of La Merced, commemorating three years since the Battle of San Juan and Chorrillos and Battle of Miraflores.

Elected deputy for Lima in 1884, he was part of the Constituent Assembly convened by President Miguel Iglesias after the signing of the Treaty of Ancón that ended the War of the Pacific. This assembly not only ratified said treaty but also ratified Miguel Iglesias as provisional president. Tovar supported the work of this government, which was soon questioned by General Andrés Avelino Cáceres and his supporters.

=== Minister of Justice, Worship, and Instruction ===
On March 14, 1885, he was appointed Minister of Justice and Worship in the government of Miguel Iglesias. After the victory of Cáceres' revolution, Tovar was one of the three Iglesian delegates who met with their Cacerist counterparts in conferences that agreed to form a Council of Ministers, headed by Antonio Arenas. Tovar himself was appointed, against his will, Minister of Justice and Worship, a position he held from December 3, 1885, to June 3, 1886.

He was appointed corresponding member of the Royal Spanish Academy, proposed by Gaspar Núñez de Arce.

=== Archbishop of Lima ===
In 1891, the government of Remigio Morales Bermúdez proposed him for a titular diocese. Pope León XIII agreed to this and appointed him Bishop of Marcópolis, being consecrated by the apostolic delegate in the Basilica and Convent of San Pedro, Lima on September 6. He was also elevated to auxiliary bishop of Lima

After the death of Archbishop of Lima Manuel Antonio Bandini, he became the capitular vicar of the Archdiocese on April 11, 1898. The government proposed him as Archbishop of Lima, which was accepted by the Holy See. On August 22, 1898, the respective bulls were issued, and on December 8, the apostolic delegate Pedro Gaspar conferred the pallium upon him. He remained in this pastoral function until his death on May 25, 1907.

He founded the newspaper El Bien Social, dedicated to the defense and propaganda of Catholic ideas. He attended the Plenary Latin American Council, inaugurated by Pope León XIII in Rome on May 28, 1898.

He carried out the restoration of the Cathedral of Lima, whose old Main Altar he gifted to the Church of San Jerónimo de Sayán, his hometown.

He promptly agreed to the creation of the bishopric of Huaraz, segregated from his own archdiocesan territory by apostolic letters of May 15, 1899, with the first bishop being Father Francisco de Sales Soto.

=== The Peruvian Church at the beginning of the 20th century ===
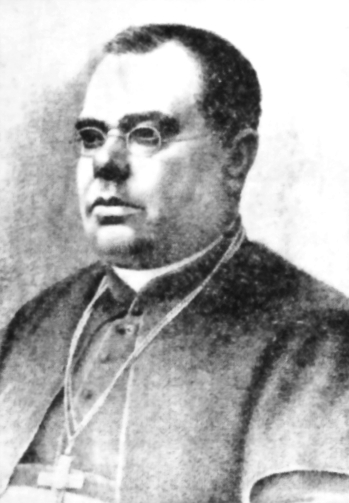
Portrait of Monsignor Tovar by Evaristo San Cristóval. In the magazine El Perú Ilustrado.

During this time, positivist and liberal thought was gaining ground. The Catholic Church suffered constant attacks from anticlerical thinkers, who used journalism, university chairs, and the Congress as platforms. However, the State, as established in the Constitution, protected the Catholic Church and prohibited the public expression of other creeds. It also provided limited economic support, but there was no concordat.

In 1900, Pope León XIII created the country's first three ecclesiastical prefectures: northern, southern, and central, assigned to Augustinians, Franciscans, and Dominicans. Later, these prefectures were elevated to apostolic vicariates. The following year, the State authorized the Church to freely administer its assets, thus giving it some economic autonomy.

In 1906, there was tension between the State and the Church, as when the well-known anticlerical politician Cesáreo Chacaltana died, Monsignor Tovar refused to say the funeral prayer at his burial, causing the Chamber of Deputies to demand from the Executive the suppression of religious ceremonies in official funeral honors, as well as the replacement of the archbishop.

=== Death ===
Victim of a rampant tuberculosis, Monsignor Tovar retired to Tarma in the central highlands of Peru, where he died at the age of 63 in 1907. In the final moments of his life, his personal physician, Belisario Sosa, was by his side. The newspapers of the time remembered him as one of the most illustrious Peruvians.

His remains currently lie in a crypt in the Cathedral of Lima.

== Bibliography ==
- Basadre, Jorge (2005a). Historia de la República del Perú. 2nd period: The fallacious prosperity of guano (1842-1866). 3rd period: The economic and fiscal crisis prior to the war with Chile (1864-1878). Vol. 6 (9th ed.). Lima: Empresa Editora El Comercio S. A. ISBN 9972-205-68-1.
- — (2005b). Historia de la República del Perú. 5th period: The beginning of the Reconstruction (1884-1895). Vol. 10 (9th ed.). Lima: Empresa Editora El Comercio S. A. ISBN 9972-205-72-X.
- Fernández García, Enrique S.J. (2000). Perú Cristiano. Primitive evangelization of Ibero-America and the Philippines, 1492-1600, and history of the Church in Peru, 1532-1900. Lima: Fondo Editorial de la PUCP. ISBN 9972-42-154-6.
- Guerra, Margarita (1984). Historia General del Perú. The Aristocratic Republic. Vol. 11 (1st ed.). Lima: Editorial Milla Batres.
