= San Roberto Bellarmino =

- Church of Saint Robert Bellarmine
- Chiesa di San Roberto Bellarmino
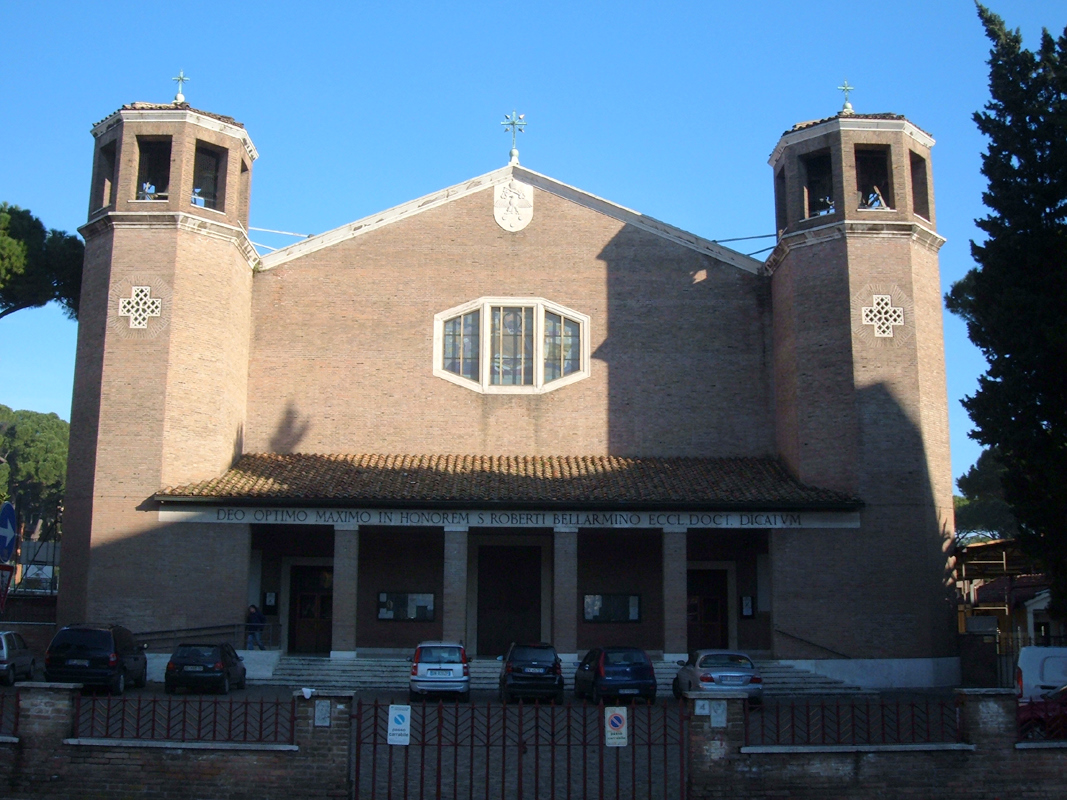
- Facade
- Click on the map for a fullscreen view
- 41°55′24″N 12°29′35″E
- Location: 13 Via Panama, Rome
- Country: Italy
- Language: Italian
- Denomination: Catholic
- Tradition: Roman Rite

History
- Status: titular church
- Founded: 1931
- Founder: Pope Pius XI
- Dedication: Robert Bellarmine
- Consecrated: 30 May 1959

Architecture
- Architect: Clemente Busiri Vici
- Architectural type: Rationalism
- Completed: 1933

Administration
- Diocese: Rome

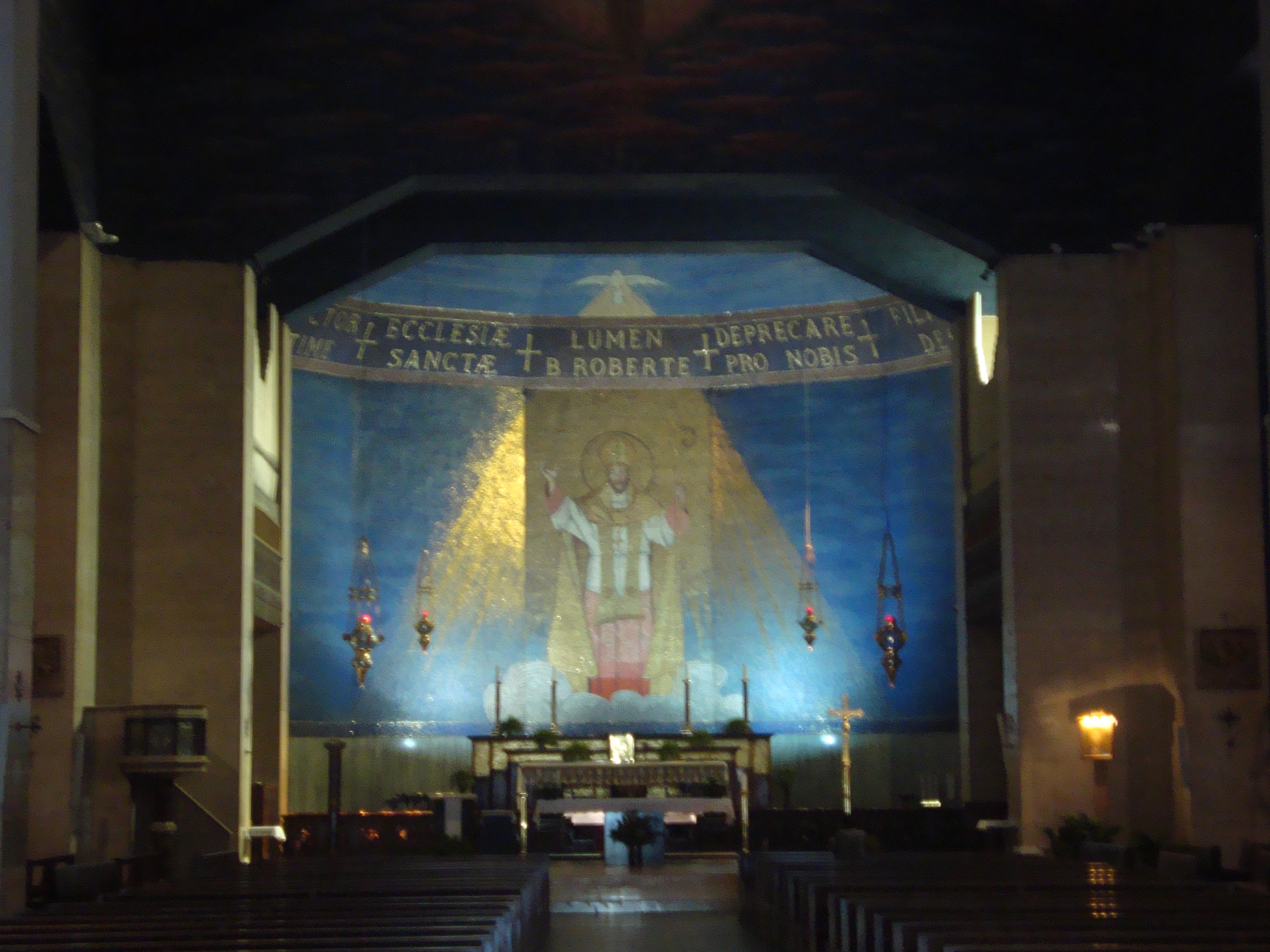
Interior

San Roberto Bellarmino is a church in Rome founded by Pope Pius XI in 1933. It followed the canonisation of the Jesuit Cardinal Robert Bellarmine (1542–1621) in 1930, and his being named a Doctor of the Church in 1931. The architect Clemente Busiri Vici made the designs in the years 1931–1933. Construction took more than two decades, and it was consecrated in 1959 by Archbishop Luigi Traglia. It is served by the Jesuits, and has a mosaic by Renato Tomassi and a high altar donated by Beniamino Gigli. San Roberto Bellarmino is a titular church. Its cardinal priest is Cardinal Mario Aurelio Poli, who was created Cardinal on 22 February 2014.

== Location ==
The church is located in Piazza Ungheria, in the quarter of Parioli.

== Cardinal priests ==
- Pablo Muñoz Vega, S.J. (28 April 1969 – 3 June 1994)
- Augusto Vargas Alzamora, S.J. (26 November 1994 – 4 September 2000)
- Jorge Mario Bergoglio, S.J. (21 February 2001 – 13 March 2013; elected Pope Francis)
- Mario Aurelio Poli (22 February 2014 – present)

== See also ==
- List of Jesuit sites
