= Santa Maria delle Grazie a Casal Boccone =

- Church of Saint Mary of the Graces in Casal Boccone
- Parrocchia Santa Maria delle Grazie a Casal Boccone
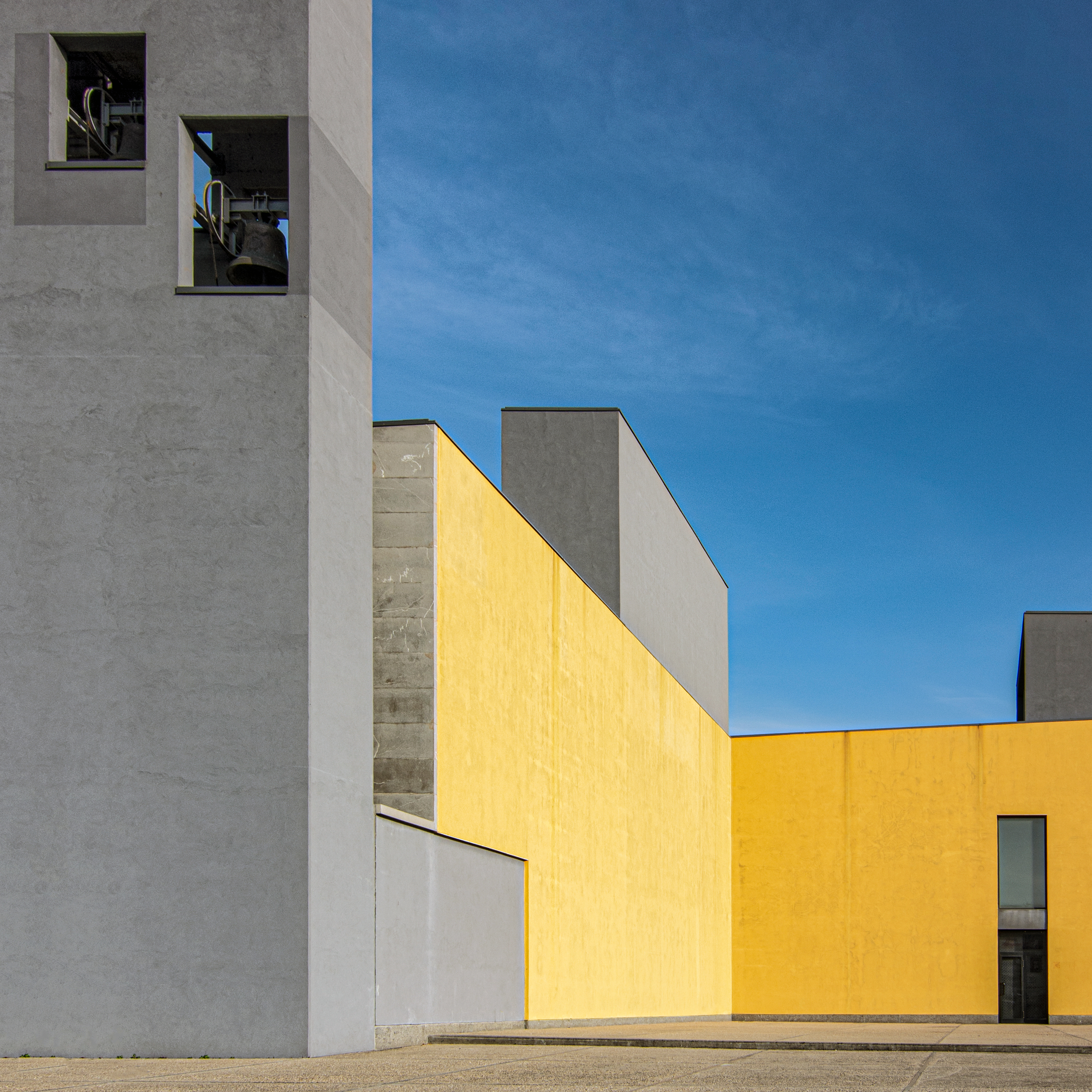
- View of bell tower and south wall

- Location within Rome
- 41°58′01″N 12°33′04″E
- Location: Via della Bufalotta 674, Casal Boccone, Rome
- Country: Italy
- Language: Italian
- Denomination: Catholic
- Tradition: Roman Rite
- Website: smdgparrocchia.com

History
- Status: titular church, parish church
- Dedication: Our Lady of Graces
- Consecrated: 1 May 2010

Architecture
- Functional status: active
- Architect(s): Francesco Garofolo and Sharon Yoshie Miura
- Architectural type: Postmodern
- Years built: 2006–2010

Administration
- Diocese: Rome

Santa Maria delle Grazie a Casal Boccone is a 21st-century parochial church and titular church in northeast Rome, dedicated to Mary of the Graces.

== History ==
The church was built in 2006–2010 to a postmodern design by the firm Garofalo Miura. Pope Benedict XVI visited the church in 2011.

On 7 December 2024, Pope Francis made it a titular church to be held by a cardinal-priest.

Cardinal-protectors

- Carlos Castillo Mattasoglio (2024 – present)
