= Juan Guevara =

His Eminence Juan Gualberto Guevara
- Cardinal; Archbishop of Lima
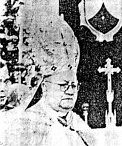
- Church: Roman Catholic Church
- Archdiocese: Lima
- See: Lima
- Appointed: 16 December 1945
- Installed: 11 January 1946
- Term ended: 27 November 1954
- Predecessor: Pedro Pascual Farfán
- Successor: Juan Landázuri Ricketts
- Other posts: Military Vicar of Peru (1945-54); Cardinal-Priest of Sant'Eusebio (1946-54)
- Previous posts: Bishop of Trujillo (1940-43); Archbishop of Trujillo (1943-45)

Orders
- Ordination: 2 June 1906 by Ismaele Puirredón
- Consecration: 2 March 1941 by Fernando Cento
- Created cardinal: 18 February 1946 by Pope Pius XII
- Rank: Cardinal-Priest

Personal details
- Born: Juan Gualberto Guevara; 12 July 1882 Villa de Vitor, Arequipa, Peru
- Died: 27 November 1954 (aged 72) Lima, Peru
- Buried: Lima Cathedral
- Education: University of San Agustin; Pontifical Gregorian University
- Motto: Dominus illuminatio mea
- Coat of arms

Juan Gualberto Guevara B.A. J.C.D. (12 July 1882 – 27 November 1954) was created on 18 February 1946 as a Cardinal Priest by Pope Pius XII. He was Archbishop of Lima in the Roman Catholic Church. He was the first Cardinal of Peru.

== Biography ==
=== Early life and education ===
He was born in Villa de Vitor in the Archdiocese of Arequipa. Educated at the Seminary of San Jerónimo, Arequipa and University of San Agustin. Graduated in 1912 with a Bachelor of Arts degree. Finally went to the Pontifical Gregorian University in Rome, where in 1922 he earned a doctorate in canon law.

=== Priesthood ===
He was ordained on 2 June 1906 in Arequipa, and worked as a parish priest from 1906 until 1910 in Arica, nowadays in Chile. He was expelled by the Chilean Government when it claimed the province that he was working in. He became Vice-rector of the Seminary of Arequipa, in 1910, where he stayed for ten years until 1920. He was named sacristan of the cathedral of Arequipa 1916 - 1920. He worked as staff member of El Deber, the oldest newspaper in southern Peru, 1916–1940 and as its director from 1928 - 1940.

=== Episcopate ===
Guevara was appointed Bishop of Trujillo by Pope Pius XII on 15 December 1940. When the diocese of Trujillo was elevated to an archdiocese he became its first archbishop on 23 May 1943. Appointed as Military Vicars of Peru on 13 January 1945 and retained that office until his death. Transferred to the metropolitan see of Lima on 16 December 1945.

=== Cardinalate ===
Styles of Juan Gualberto Guevara
- Reference style: His Eminence
- Spoken style: Your Eminence
- Informal style: Cardinal
- See: Lima

Pope Pius XII created him Cardinal Priest of Sant'Eusebio in the consistory of 18 February 1946. He was thus the first Peruvian cardinal ever created. Died in 1954 of cancer in Lima. Buried in the metropolitan cathedral of Lima.

== Public morality ==
Guevara once told several mothers of bathing-suit parade contestants that such a parade would be contrary to religion and modesty.

Preceded by Carlo Garcia Irigoyen	Bishop of Trujillo (Elevated on 23 May 1943 to Archbishop); 15 December 1940–16 December 1945	Succeeded by Aurelio Macedonio Guerrero
Preceded by Pedro Pascual Farfán	Archbishop of Lima; 16 December 1945–27 November 1954	Succeeded by Juan Landázuri Ricketts
