= Ernesto Giobando =

Auxiliary Bishop of Buenos Aires since 2014

Ernesto Giobando S.J.
- Bishop of Mar del Plata
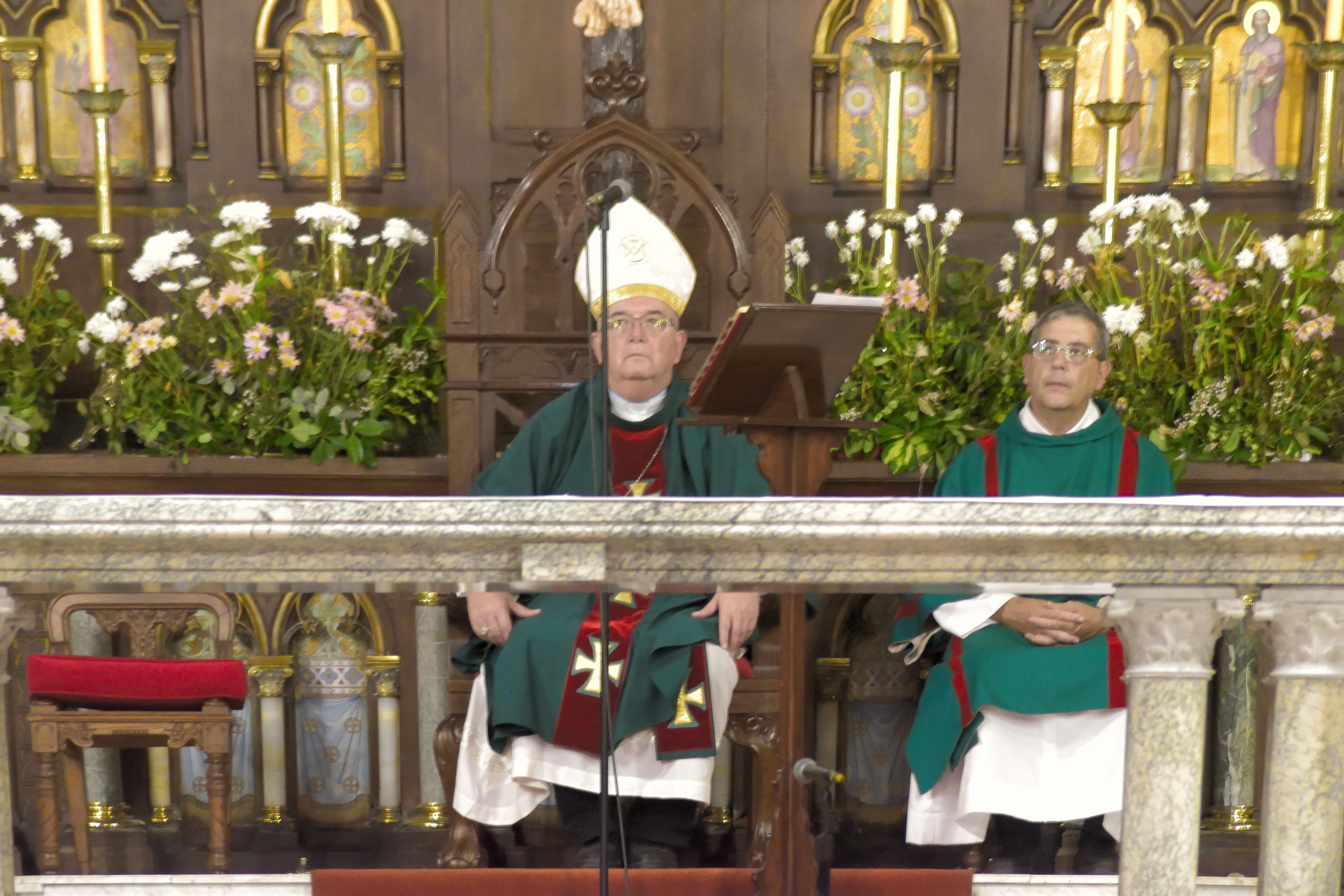
- Church: Catholic Church
- Diocese: Diocese of Mar del Plata
- Appointed: 12 December 2024
- Predecessor: José María Baliña
- Previous posts: Apostolic Administrator of Mar del Plata (2024); Titular Bishop of Appiaria (2014-2024); Auxiliary Bishop of Buenos Aires (2014-2024)

Orders
- Ordination: 17 November 1990 by José Manuel Lorenzo
- Consecration: 3 May 2014 by Mario Aurelio Poli

Personal details
- Born: 13 December 1959 (age 66) Santa Fe, Santa Fe Province, Argentina

Ernesto Giobando, S.J. (13 December 1959) is an Argentine Catholic prelate who has served as an Auxiliary Bishop of Buenos Aires since 2014. He is a member of the Society of Jesus.

== Life ==
Born in Santa Fe, Argentina, Giobando was ordained to the priesthood on 17 November 1990.

On 5 March 2014 he was appointed auxiliary bishop of Buenos Aires and titular bishop of Appiaria. Giobando received his episcopal consecration on 3 May from Mario Aurelio Poli, archbishop of Buenos Aires, with bishop of Lomas de Zamora, Jorge Rubén Lugones, bishop of Azul, Hugo Manuel Salaberry Goyeneche, bishop of Jujuy, César Daniel Fernández, and auxiliary bishop emeritus of Buenos Aires, Horacio Ernesto Benites Astoul, serving as co-consecrators.

== See also ==
- Catholic Church in Argentina
