= James Burke (bishop) =

Most Reverend James C. Burke, OP
- Territorial Prelate emeritus of Chimbote
- Church: Catholic Church
- See: Titular See of Lamiggiga
- In office: March 8, 1965 – June 2, 1978

Orders
- Ordination: June 8, 1956
- Consecration: May 25, 1967 by Richard Cushing

Personal details
- Born: November 30, 1926 Philadelphia, Pennsylvania
- Died: May 28, 1994 (aged 67) Newark, Delaware

James C. Burke, O.P. (November 30, 1926 – May 28, 1994) was an American-born bishop of the Catholic Church in Peru. He served as the Territorial Prelate of Chimbote from 1965 to 1978. After his retirement he served the Diocese of Wilmington in the U.S. state of Delaware from 1978 to 1994.

== Biography ==
Born in Philadelphia, Pennsylvania, James Burke was ordained a priest in the Order of Preachers (Dominicans) on June 8, 1956. On March 8, 1965 Pope Paul VI appointed him as the first Territorial Prelate of Chimbote. He participated in the fourth session of the Second Vatican Council in 1965. Burke was named the Titular Bishop of Lamiggiga by Pope Paul on April 8, 1967. He was consecrated a bishop by Cardinal Richard Cushing of Boston on May 25, 1967. The principal co-consecrators were Bishop Walter Curtis of Bridgeport and Auxiliary Bishop Edward Swanstrom of New York. He continued to serve as Territorial Prelate until his resignation was accepted by Pope Paul on June 2, 1978. After his retirement he assisted in the Diocese of Wilmington, Delaware, in the U.S., as vicar for urban affairs (not as coadjutor or auxiliary), until his death on May 28, 1994, at the age of 67.
