= Diocese of Carabayllo =

Catholic diocese in Peru (est. 1996)

Coordinates: 11°51′S 77°02′W

Diocese of Carabayllo Dioecesis Carabaillensis

catholic

Location
- Country: Peru
- Metropolitan: Lima

Statistics
- Area: 1,200 km^{2} (460 sq mi)
- Population: Total; Catholics: (as of 2004); 2,300,000; 2,000,000 (87.0%)

Information
- Denomination: Catholic Church
- Sui iuris church: Latin Church
- Rite: Roman Rite
- Established: 1996

Current leadership
- Pope: Leo XIV
- Bishop: Neri Menor Vargas
- Auxiliary Bishops: Guillermo Teodoro Elías Millares
- Bishops emeritus: Lino Panizza Richero

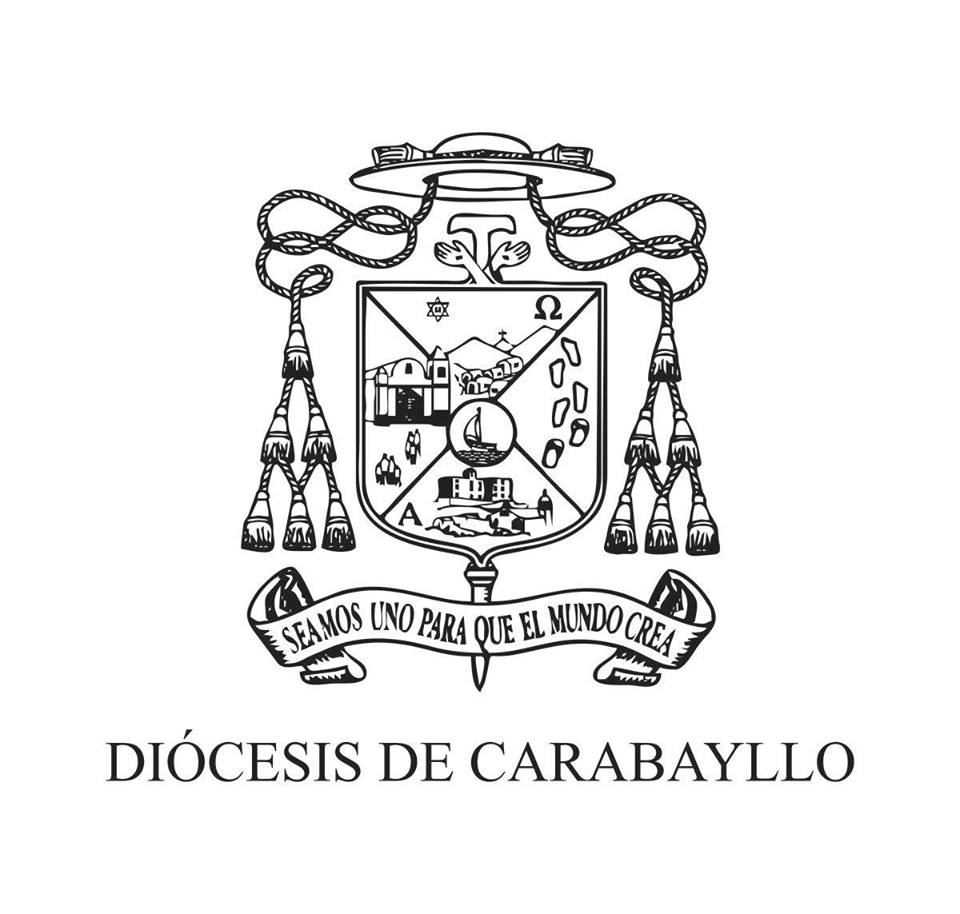
Coat of arms of the Diocese of Carabayllo

The Diocese of Carabayllo (Latin: Carabaillen(sis)) is a Latin diocese of the Catholic Church located in the city of Carabayllo within the ecclesiastical province of Lima in Peru.

== History ==
- 14 December 1996: Established as Diocese of Carabayllo from the Metropolitan Archdiocese of Lima

== Bishops ==
=== Ordinaries ===
- Lino Panizza Richero, O.F.M. Cap. (December 14, 1996 - April 20, 2022)
- Neri Menor Vargas, O.F.M. (since April 20, 2022)

=== Other priest of this diocese who became bishop ===
- Guillermo Teodoro Elías Millares, auxiliary bishop of the archdiocese of Lima (2019–)

== See also ==
- Catholic Church in Peru

== Sources ==
- GCatholic.org
- Catholic Hierarchy
- Diocese website
