= Andahuasi =

Empresa Agraria Azucarera Andahuasi S.A.A.
- Company type: Public company (BVL: ANDAHUAC1)
- Industry: Food & beverages
- Founded: (1923)
- Headquarters: Lima, Peru
- Key people: Eduardo Nuñez Cámara (Chairman); Carlos Miguel Luna Conroy (CEO)
- Products: Sugar milk molasses Beef
- Revenue: ▲US$ 25.1 Million (2008)
- Number of employees: 1,860
- Website: www.andahuasi.com.

Andahuasi (BVL: ANDAHUAC1) is a Peruvian company primarily engaged in the agriculture sector.

The company specializes in the cultivation and processing of sugarcane and fruits, such as apples, papayas and pineapples. It commercializes and exports products like sugar, molasses, bagasse, alcohol, liquors and other sugar derivates. Additionally, the company is involved in livestock farming.

The main shareholders of the company are Industrial Andahuasi and Ducktown Holdings with stakes of 0.69% and 10.07% respectively.
