= Archdiocese of Lima =

Roman Catholic Archdiocese in Peru

Coordinates: 12.0466°S 77.0298°W

Archdiocese of Lima Archidioecesis Limana

Catholic
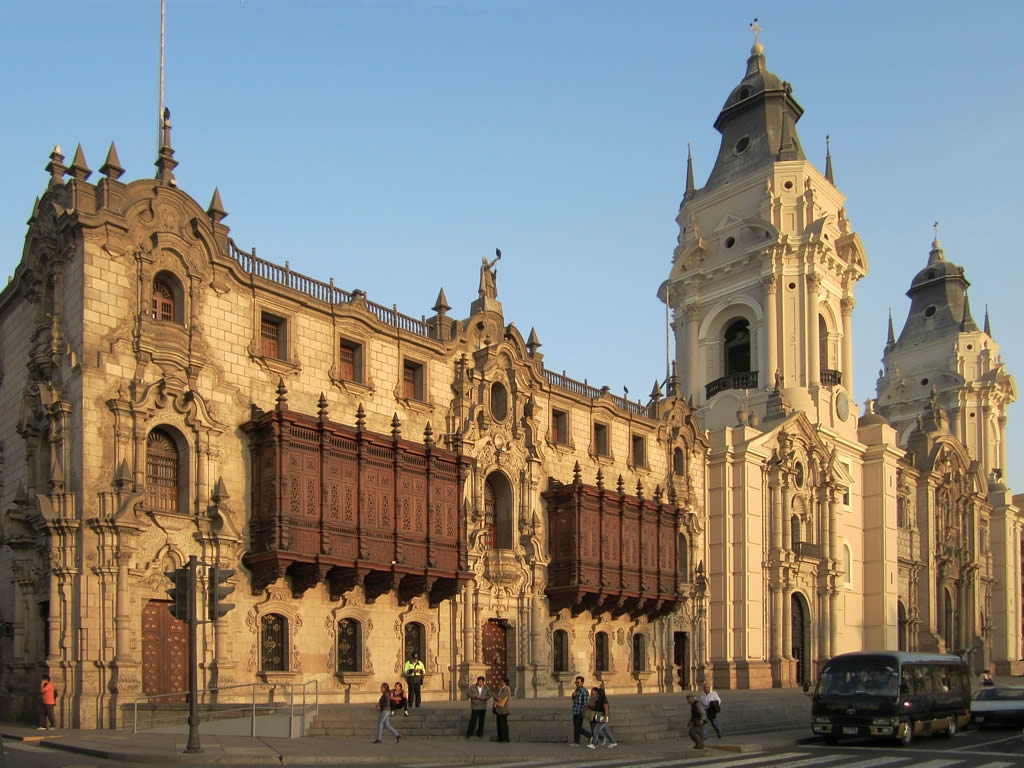
- Cathedral Basilica of St. John the Apostle and Evangelist

Location
- Country: Peru
- Ecclesiastical province: Lima

Statistics
- Area: 639 km^{2} (247 sq mi)
- Population: Total; Catholics: (as of 2021); 3,582,000; 3,224,000 (90%)
- Parishes: 125

Information
- Denomination: Catholic Church
- Rite: Roman Rite
- Established: 14 May 1541 (485 years ago)
- Cathedral: Catedral Basílica San Juan Apóstol y Evangelista

Current leadership
- Pope: Leo XIV
- Metropolitan Archbishop: Carlos Castillo Mattasoglio
- Auxiliary Bishops: Ricardo Augusto Rodríguez Álvarez; Guillermo Teodoro Elías Millares; Juan José Salaverry Villarreal; Guillermo Antonio Cornejo Monzón
- Bishops emeritus: Juan Luis Cipriani Thorne; Adriano Tomasi Travaglia

Map

Website
- www.arzobispadodelima.org

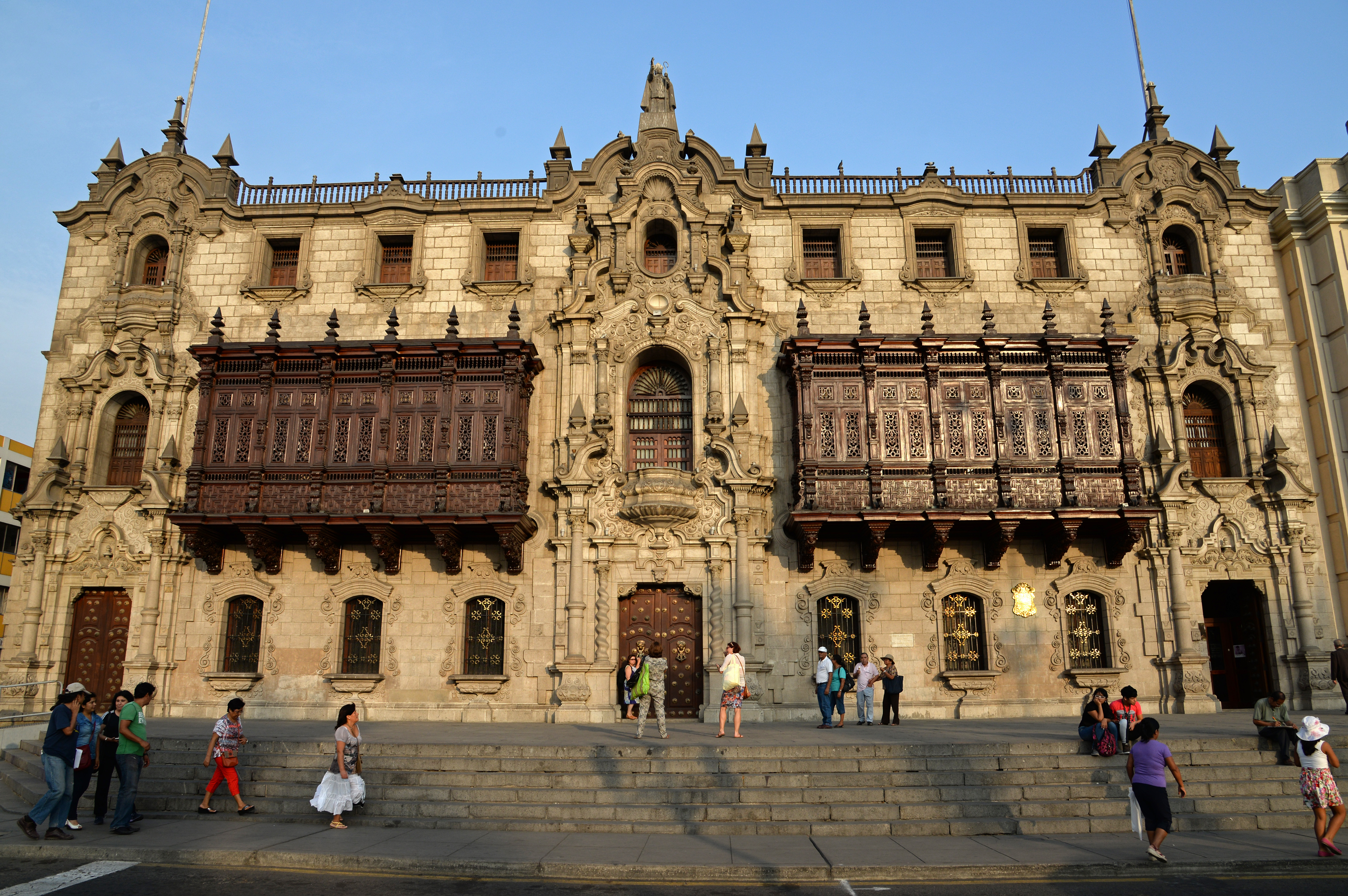
The Archbishop's Palace of Lima is the seat of the Archdiocese of Lima

The Roman Catholic Archdiocese of Lima (Latin: Archidioecesis Limana) is part of the Catholic Church in Peru which enjoys full communion with the Holy See. The Archdiocese was founded as the Diocese of Lima on 14 May 1541. The diocese was raised to the level of a metropolitan archdiocese by Pope Paul III on 12 February 1546. One of its archbishops was the saint Torribio Mogrovejo.

The suffragan dioceses are: Callao, Carabayllo, Chosica, Huacho, Ica, Lurín, and (Territorial Prelature) Yauyos. From 1999 to 2019 the Archbishop of Lima was Juan Luis Cipriani Thorne, made Cardinal in 2001. The Archbishop's Palace of Lima is the headquarters of the archdiocese.

== History ==
The Diocese of Lima (or City of Kings) was erected on May 14, 1541, by Pope Paul III, obtaining the territory of the then Diocese of Cuzco. It was originally a suffragan of the Archdiocese of Seville.The first Bishop of Lima was Jerónimo de Loayza, who was elected on May 13, 1541. In 1535, construction began on the Lima Metropolitan Cathedral as the main church. On January 8, 1546, it ceded a portion of its territory for the establishment of the then Diocese of Quito through the Militantis Ecclesiae of Pope Paul III.

On February 12, 1546, it was elevated to the rank of metropolitan archdiocese by Pope Paul III. The original ecclesiastical province (which at one point in its history became the largest in the world) included all the dioceses of the Spanish possessions on the Pacific coast of America in the Viceroyalty of Peru, namely: the dioceses of Nicaragua, Panama, Quito, and, to which the diocese of Popayán was added in August of the same year. Fray Gerónimo de Loayza González automatically became its first archbishop. On June 27, 1561, another portion of territory was ceded for the erection of the then Diocese of Santiago de Chile by Pope Pius IV.

In 1572, Pope Pius V granted the archbishops of Lima the title of Primates of Peru, which was later confirmed by Pope Gregory XVI in 1834. [Source?] On April 15, 1577, he ceded new portions of territory for the establishment of the then Diocese of Trujillo through Pope Gregory XIII.

On December 7, 1590, the saintly Archbishop Turibius of Mogrovejo established the first seminary on the American continent in Lima, which today bears his name. On October 19, 1625, the present, Lima Metropolitan Cathedral was consecrated.

In the report from the Viceroy of Peru, José Antonio Manso de Velasco, to his successor dated August 23, 1761, he indicated that the archdiocese had a population of 102,153 in the 15 provinces that then comprised it. It had 161 curacies, of which 14 were Spanish parishes.

On April 29, 1967, he ceded new portions of his territory for the establishment of the Diocese of Callao by the bull Aptiorem Ecclesiarum of Pope Paul VI. On March 10, 1970, the Archdiocese ceded the district of Ventanilla to the Diocese of Callao.

On October 6, 1990, with the apostolic letter Antiquissimus sane, Pope John Paul II confirmed the Blessed Virgin Mary, venerated under the title of Our Lady of Evangelization, as patron of the archdiocese. On December 14, 1996, it ceded new portions of its territory for the erection by Pope John Paul II of the dioceses of Carabayllo, Chosica, and Lurín.

== Ordinaries ==
=== Diocese of Lima ===
Erected: 14 May 1541

- Jerónimo de Loayza, OP (13 May 1541 – 25 October 1575)

=== Archdiocese of Lima ===
Elevated: 12 February 1546

- Diego Gómez de Lamadrid, OSsT (27 Mar 1577 – 13 June 1578) Appointed, Archbishop (Personal Title) of Badajoz
- St. Toribio Alfonso de Mogrovejo (16 May 1579 – 23 May 1606) Died
- Bartolomé Lobo Guerrero (19 Nov 1607 – 12 January 1622) Died
- Gonzalo del Campo (López de Ocampo) (2 Oct 1623 – 15 October 1627) Died
- Hernando de Arias y Ugarte (1630 – 27 January 1638) Died
- Pedro de Villagómez Vivanco (16 Jul 1640 – 12 May 1671) Died
- Juan de Almoguera, OSsT (6 May 1674 – 2 March 1676) Died
- Melchor de Liñán y Cisneros (14 Jun 1677 – 28 June 1708) Died
- Antonio de Zuloaga (21 May 1714 – 21 January 1722) Died
- Diego Morcillo Rubio de Suñón de Robledo, OSsT (12 May 1723 – 12 March 1730) Died
- Juan Francisco Antonio de Escandón, CR (1732 – 28 April 1739) Died
- José Antonio Gutiérrez y Ceballos (11 Nov 1740 – 16 January 1745) Died
- Agustín Rodríguez Delgado (14 Jun 1746 – 18 December 1746) Died
- Pedro Antonio Barroeta y Ángel (18 Sep 1748 – 19 December 1757) Appointed, Archbishop of Granada
- Diego del Corro (13 Mar 1758 – 28 January 1761) Died
- Diego Antonio de Parada (25 Jan 1762 – 23 April 1779) Died
- Juan Domingo González de la Reguera (18 Sep 1780 – 8 March 1805) Died
- Bartolomé María de las Heras Navarro (31 Mar 1806 – 6 September 1823) Died
- Jorge Benavente Macoaga (23 Jun 1834 – 10 March 1839) Died
- Francisco de Sales Arrieta Ortiz (13 Jul 1840 – 4 May 1843) Died
- Francisco Javier Luna-Pizarro y Pacheco de Chávez (24 Apr 1845 – 4 February 1855) Died
- José Manuel Pasquel Losada (28 Sep 1855 – 15 October 1857) Died
- José Sebastian Goyeneche y Barreda (26 Sep 1859 – 19 February 1872) Died
- Manuel Teodoro del Valle Seoane (29 Aug 1872 – 19 November 1872) Resigned
- Francisco de Asis Orueta y Castrillón (21 Mar 1873 – ?) Died
- Manuel Antonio Bandini Mazuelos (1889–1898) Died
- Manuel Tovar y Chamorro (22 Aug 1898 – 25 May 1907) Died
- Pedro Manuel García Naranjo (19 Dec 1907 – 10 September 1917) Died
- Emilio Juan Francisco Lissón y Chávez, CM (25 Feb 1918 – 3 March 1931) Resigned
- Pedro Pascuál Francesco Farfán de los Godos (18 Sep 1933 – 17 September 1945) Died
- Cardinal Juan Gualberto Guevara (16 Dec 1945 – 27 November 1954) Died
- Cardinal Juan Landázuri Ricketts, OFM (2 May 1955 – 30 December 1989) Retired
- Cardinal Augusto Vargas Alzamora, SJ (30 Dec 1989 – 9 January 1999) Retired
- Cardinal Juan Luis Cipriani Thorne (9 Jan 1999 – 25 January 2019) Retired
- Cardinal Carlos Castillo Mattasoglio (25 January 2019 – present)

== Other affiliated bishops ==
=== Coadjutor archbishop ===
- Juan Landázuri Ricketts, OFM (1952–1955); future Cardinal

=== Auxiliary bishops ===
°Antonio Vigo, OdeM (1664–1666), did not take effect

- Blasius de Aguinaga (1669), did not take effect
- Nicolás de Ulloa y Hurtado de Mendoza, OSA (1677–1679), appointed Bishop of Córdoba (Tucumán), Argentina
- Francisco Cisneros y Mendoza (1702–1724)
- Pedro Morcillo Rubio de Auñón (1724–1731), appointed Bishop of Panamá
- Francisco Gutiérrez Galeano (1738–1745), appointed Bishop of Ayacucho o Huamanga (Guamanga)
- Francisco Javier Luna-Pizarro y Pacheco de Chávez (1836–1845), appointed Archbishop here
- José Manuel Pasquel y Losada (1848–1855), appointed Archbishop here
- Francisco de Asis Orueta y Castrillón, CO (1855–1859), appointed Bishop of Trujillo (later returned here as Archbishop)
- Pedro José Tordoya Montoya (1860–1875), appointed Bishop of Cuzco
- Pedro Ignacio de Benavente y del Castillo (1865–1883)
- Manuel Antonio Bandini Mazuelos (1879–1889), appointed Archbishop here
- José María Carpenter Aponte (1891–1905)
- Manuel Tovar y Chamorro (1891–1898), appointed Archbishop here
- Julian Cáceres Negrón (1901–1904)
- Segundo Ballón Manrique (1909–1923)
- José Gregorio Castro Miranda, OFM (1917–1924)
- Leonardo José Rodriguez Ballón, OFM (1943–1945), appointed Bishop of Huancayo
- Federico Pérez Silva, CM (1946–1952), appointed Coadjutor Bishop of Piura
- Fidel Mario Tubino Mongilardi (1956–1973)
- José Antonio Dammert Bellido (1958–1962), appointed Bishop of Cajamarca
- Mario Renato Cornejo Radavero (1961–1969)
- Luis Armando Bambarén Gastelumendi, SJ (1967–1978), appointed Prelate of Chimbote
- Germán Schmitz Sauerborn, MSC (1970–1990)
- Augusto Beuzeville Ferro (1973–1990), appointed Auxiliary Bishop of Piura
- Alberto Aurelio Brazzini Diaz-Ufano (1978–2001)
- Alfredo Noriega Arce, SJ (1980–1993)
- Javier Miguel Ariz Huarte, OP (1980–1995)
- Hugo Garaycoa Hawkins (1982–1991), appointed Bishop of Tacna
- Héctor Miguel Cabrejos Vidarte, OFM (1988–1996), appointed Bishop of Peru, Military
- Oscar Julio Alzamora Revoredo, SM (1991–1999)
- Norbert Klemens Strotmann Hoppe, MSC (1992–1997), appointed Bishop of Chosica
- José Antonio Eguren Anselmi, SCV (2002–2006), appointed Archbishop of Piura
- Carlos Enrique García Camader (2002–2006), appointed Bishop of Lurín
- Adriano Tomasi Travaglia, OFM (2002–2019)
- Guillermo Martín Abanto Guzmán (2009–2012), appointed Bishop of Peru, Military
- Raúl Antonio Chau Quispe (2009–2019), appointed Auxiliary Bishop of Arequipa
- Guillermo Teodoro Elías Millares (2019-)
- Ricardo Augusto Rodríguez Álvarez (2019-)

=== Other priests of this diocese who became bishops ===
- Diego Montero del Aguila, appointed Bishop of Concepción, Chile in 1708
- Juan Manuel Moscoso y Peralta, appointed Auxiliary Bishop of Arequipa in 1770
- José Vicente Silva Avilés y Olave Salaverría, appointed Bishop of Ayacucho o Huamanga (Guamanga) in 1815; did not take effect
- Pedro Gutiérrez de Cos y Saavedra Seminario, appointed Bishop of Ayacucho o Huamanga (Guamanga) in 1818
- Juan Rodríguez Reymúndez, appointed Bishop of Ayacucho o Huamanga (Guamanga) in 1838; did not take effect
- Agustín Guillermo Charún Espinoza, appointed Bishop of Trujillo in 1853
- Bartolomé Manuel Herrera Vélez, appointed Bishop of Arequipa in 1859
- Juan María Ambrosio Huerta Galván, appointed Bishop of Puno in 1865
- José Francisco Ezequiel Moreyra, appointed Bishop of Ayacucho o Huamanga (Guamanga) in 1865
- Juan José de Polo Valenzuela, appointed Bishop of Ayacucho o Huamanga (Guamanga) in 1875
- Manuel Santiago Medina y Bañon, appointed Bishop of Trujillo in 1889
- Ismaele Puirredón, appointed Bishop of Puno in 1889
- Juan Antonio Falcón Iturrizaga, appointed Bishop of Cuzco in 1893
- Carlos Garcia Irigoyen, appointed Bishop of Trujillo in 1910
- Salvador Piñeiro García-Calderón, appointed Bishop of Peru, Military in 2001
- Cristóbal Bernardo Mejía Corral (priest here, 1989–1996), appointed Bishop of Chulucanas in 2020
