= Emilio Lissón =

Coat of arms

Emilio Juan Francisco Lissón y Chávez, C.M. (24 May 1872 – 25 December 1961), was an Archbishop of Lima, Peru.

== Early years ==
Lissón was born in the city of Arequipa to a strongly Catholic family. He entered the Congregation of the Mission, commonly referred to as the Vincentian Fathers, in 1891. He was sent to France to pursue his theological studies and was ordained as a Catholic priest in Paris on 8 June 1895 by Archbishop Hilarion Joseph Montéty Pailhas, C.M.

== Episcopacy ==
In April 1909, Lissón was appointed by Pope Pius X as the Bishop of Chachapoyas. He was consecrated for this office the following 19 September. In 1911, during the course of a trip to Rome, he visited the General Motherhouse of the Passionists to request help for the work in his diocese. As a result, six priests and six lay brothers of that congregation were assigned to his territory in 1913, and worked there until 1918. In that year, he was promoted by Pope Benedict XV to the post of Archbishop of Lima and Primate of Peru.

== Episcopal Work ==
Lissón organized and presided at several episcopal assemblies, as well as at an Archdiocesan Synod (1926) and a Provincial Council (1927). He promoted the creation of the Apostolic Prefecture of San Gabriel of the Marañón, based in Yurimaguas, under the charge of the Passionist Fathers.

Lissón resigned his office on 3 March 1931. The Holy See appointed him titular Archbishop of Mithimna and then named Mariano Holguín, O.F.M., the Bishop of Arequipa, as the Apostolic Administrator of the archdiocese of Lima, until 1933 when Pedro Pascual Francisco Farfán was named archbishop.

Lissón moved to Spain, devoting himself to compiling papers on the history of the Church in Peru and died there on Christmas Day of 1961.
