= Juan Landázuri Ricketts =

Peruvian cardinal

His Eminence Juan Landázuri Ricketts O.F.M.
- Cardinal, Archbishop Emeritus of Lima
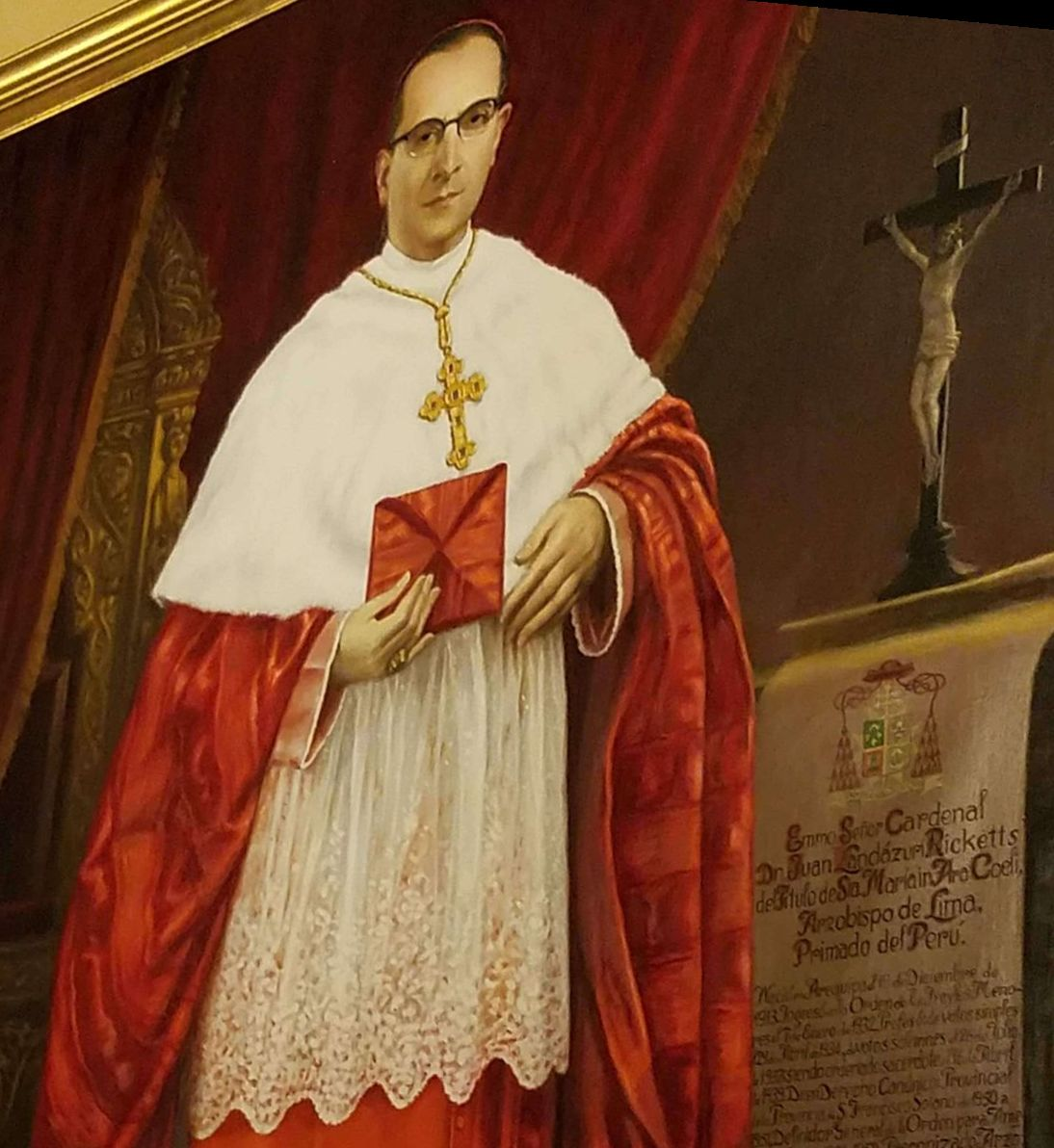
- Archdiocese: Lima
- Appointed: 2 May 1955
- Term ended: 30 December 1989
- Predecessor: Juan Gualberto Guevara y de la Cuba
- Successor: Augusto Vargas Alzamora
- Other post: Cardinal Priest of Santa Maria in Ara Coeli
- Previous posts: Coadjutor Archbishop of Lima (1952-1955); Titular Archbishop of Rhoina (1952-1955)

Orders
- Ordination: 16 April 1939 by Francisco Miguel Irazola y Galarza
- Consecration: 24 August 1952 by Juan Gualberto Guevara y de la Cuba
- Created cardinal: 19 March 1962 by John XXIII
- Rank: Cardinal-Priest

Personal details
- Born: 19 December 1913 Arequipa, Peru
- Died: 16 January 1997 (aged 83) Lima, Peru
- Denomination: Roman Catholic
- Motto: ambulante in dilectione
- Coat of arms

Styles of Juan Landázuri Ricketts
- Reference style: His Eminence
- Spoken style: Your Eminence
- Informal style: Cardinal
- See: Lima

Juan Landázuri Ricketts, OFM (born Guillermo Eduardo Landázuri Ricketts; December 19, 1913 – January 16, 1997) was Peruvian Catholic prelate who served as Archbishop of Lima from 1955 to 1989. He was one of the most prominent Catholic bishops during the 1960s and 1970s in Latin America. He was a member of the Order of Friars Minor.

This was a period in which the Church took a strong stance against human rights abuses by numerous military juntas; it also expressed a preference for the poor and concerns about extreme poverty and wealth inequality. Before he turned 80 on December 19, 1993, Juan Landázuri Ricketts was the last cardinal elevated by Pope John XXIII to retain voting rights in a papal conclave.

== Early life ==
Born as Guillermo Eduardo Landázuri Ricketts in 1913 in Arequipa, Peru, he was educated in Catholic schools, and entered the Convento de Ocopa seminary at the age of 17.

He joined the Order of Friars Minor in 1937 (taking the name Juan) and was ordained a priest two years later, on 16 May 1939.

His ability as a priest was immediately noticed, and he was appointed as secretary to the general delegation of his order as early as 1943. After finishing his theological studies in 1949, Landázuri Ricketts served briefly a faculty member of the Franciscan Theological Seminary in Puerto Ocopa. His status within the wider Church was rising rapidly, and he was selected as the general definitor of the Order of Friars Minor by 1951.

== Archbishop of Lima ==
In June 1952, Landázuri Ricketts was appointed titular bishop of Roina, as auxiliary and coadjutor in Lima, and in December 1954 replaced the deceased Juan Gualberto Guevara as Archbishop of Lima.

His appointment coincided with a radically modernising military dictatorship under Manuel Odria. Efforts at such reform were repeated until 1980. As Archbishop, he collaborated with these efforts for sweeping agricultural and institutional reforms to take Peru into the modern world and develop its great economic potential. He believed that these would improve social conditions in the country.

In 1961 to 1962, although "from the Catholic periphery", he was a key member of the important committee that set up the Vatican II Council, which radically changed Roman Catholic liturgy and theology. By 1962 he had been selected as Primate of Peru and was made a Cardinal-Priest of Santa Maria in Aracoeli by Pope John XXIII in June 1962.

He made great efforts, aided by the Jesuits in Peru, to consolidate the vast archives of the Lima Archdiocese. These had accumulated since Spanish colonisation of Latin America and were invaluable sources of the history of the region.

== Liberation theology ==
In the following period Landázuri Ricketts led during a period when priests rapidly developed liberation theology and a theory of resistance to the military dictatorship under Ricardo Perez Godoy who ruled Peru. Landázuri Ricketts responded to this with considerable support. In 1959, he said:

The Church sees the present social and economic order must be reformed and improved ... A living wage must be paid to workers...

— Archbishop Landázuri Ricketts

In response, the entrenched oligarchy called him and Bishop Leonidas Proaño "Marxist manipulators." By comparison, in 1961, the Rand Corporation, a United States think tank, called him "moderate and able".

He was also trying to ensure that the laity and nuns had considerable say in local decision-making.

He became a major participant as Acting President in the 1968 Medellin Conference, more formally known as the Second Episcopal Conference of Latin America. This was the follow-up to Vatican II, which was to implement the reforms of that system to Latin America; it was both "selective" and "creative" in its reception of the Council. At its core, the Medellin Conference's final report, fully embraced Liberation Theology, which was "the church's decision to make a pastoral option for the poor."

In 1970, in accordance with his Franciscan ideals, and the "reforming spirit" of the times, Landázuri Ricketts left the Archbishop's palace and moved into a small house in a working-class area of Lima.

Although he served on the Pontifical Council for Interreligious Dialogue during the 1970s, his relationship with the Vatican soured after the ascension of John Paul II. That pope believed that liberation theology posed problems for Catholicism and was too involved in opposition to temporal political systems. Despite being an extremely respected prelate, Landázuri Ricketts had to accept more conservative Opus Dei bishops and sympathisers being appointed in Peru during the 1980s and 1990s.

== Later life and death ==
He was regularly elected as the leader of local episcopal conference almost without opposition until he reached the age of 75 in 1988. He served as a voting Cardinal in three papal conclaves, until he lost his right to vote as a Cardinal-Elector at the age of 80.

Due to his advancing age, he resigned his role as head of the South American Bishops' conference in 1989. He retired from the see in 1990 and was succeeded by Augusto Vargas Alzamora.

On 24 December 1996, he was admitted to a hospital with a diagnosis of advanced stage cancer. He died on 16 January 1997.
