= Augusto Vargas Alzamora =

Archbishop of Lima and a cardinal priest

His Eminence Augusto Vargas Alzamora S.J.
- Archbishop Emeritus of Lima
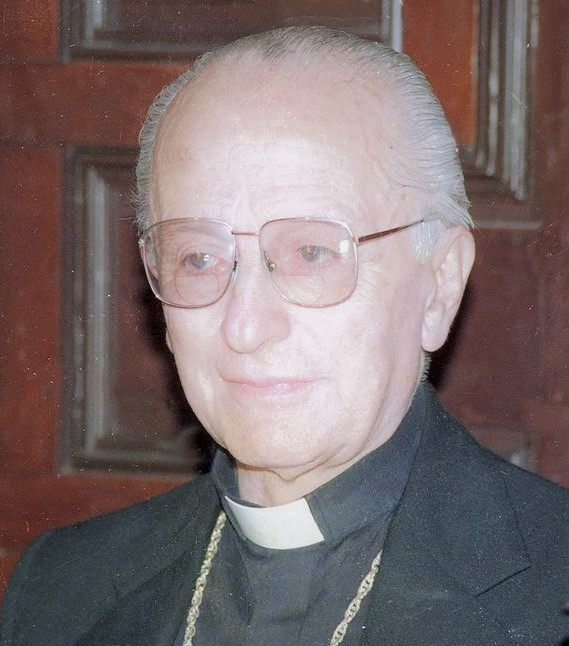
- Church: Roman Catholic Church
- Appointed: 30 December 1989
- Installed: 26 January 1990
- Term ended: 9 January 1999
- Predecessor: Juan Landázuri Ricketts
- Successor: Juan Luis Cipriani Thorne
- Other post: Cardinal-Priest of San Roberto Bellarmino (1994–2000)
- Previous posts: Apostolic Vicar of Jaén en Perú (1978-85); Titular Bishop of Cissi (1978-89); President of the Peruvian Episcopal Conference (1993-99)

Orders
- Ordination: 15 July 1955 by José María García Lahiguera
- Consecration: 15 August 1978 by Carlo Furno
- Created cardinal: 26 November 1994 by Pope John Paul II
- Rank: Cardinal-Priest

Personal details
- Born: Augusto Vargas Alzamora; 9 November 1922 Lima, Peru
- Died: 4 September 2000 (aged 77) Monterrico, Lima, Peru
- Education: National University of San Marcos
- Motto: Amaos los unos a los otros
- Coat of arms

Styles of Augusto Vargas Alzamora
- Reference style: His Eminence
- Spoken style: Your Eminence
- Informal style: Cardinal
- See: Lima

Augusto Vargas Alzamora S.J. (9 November 1922 – 4 September 2000) was a Cardinal Priest and Archbishop of Lima in the Roman Catholic Church.

He joined the Society of Jesus in 1940. He studied at the Jesuit Philosophical Faculty in San Miguel, Argentina and Madrid. He continued his studies in Granada, Spain and the University of San Marcos, Lima, where he received his doctorate in education. Pope Paul VI appointed him titular bishop of Cissi and apostolic vicar of Jaén, Peru on 8 June 1978. In 1982 he was elected secretary general of the Episcopal conference of Peru, and was reelected twice more. He was to become its president from 1993 to 1999. He resigned the pastoral government of the vicariate in 1985. In 1989 Pope John Paul II appointed him Archbishop of Lima, where he stayed until he retired in 1999. Pope John Paul elevated him to the cardinalate in the consistory of 26 November 1994, making him Cardinal Priest of S. Roberto Bellarmino. After he retired as Archbishop he continued until his death ministering at a homeless shelter he founded in Lima.

As Archbishop of Lima, he frequently clashed with Peruvian President Alberto Fujimori, demanding that the president observe human rights and democratic forms, and, at a later stage, over the president's pushing of family planning programmes. He campaigned openly against Fujimori's election.

Catholic Church titles
Preceded by Juan Landázuri Ricketts	Archbishop of Lima; 30 December 1989 – 9 January 1999	Succeeded by Juan Luis Cipriani Thorne
