= Sayán District =

Coordinates: 11.1348°S 77.1922°W

Sayán
- District
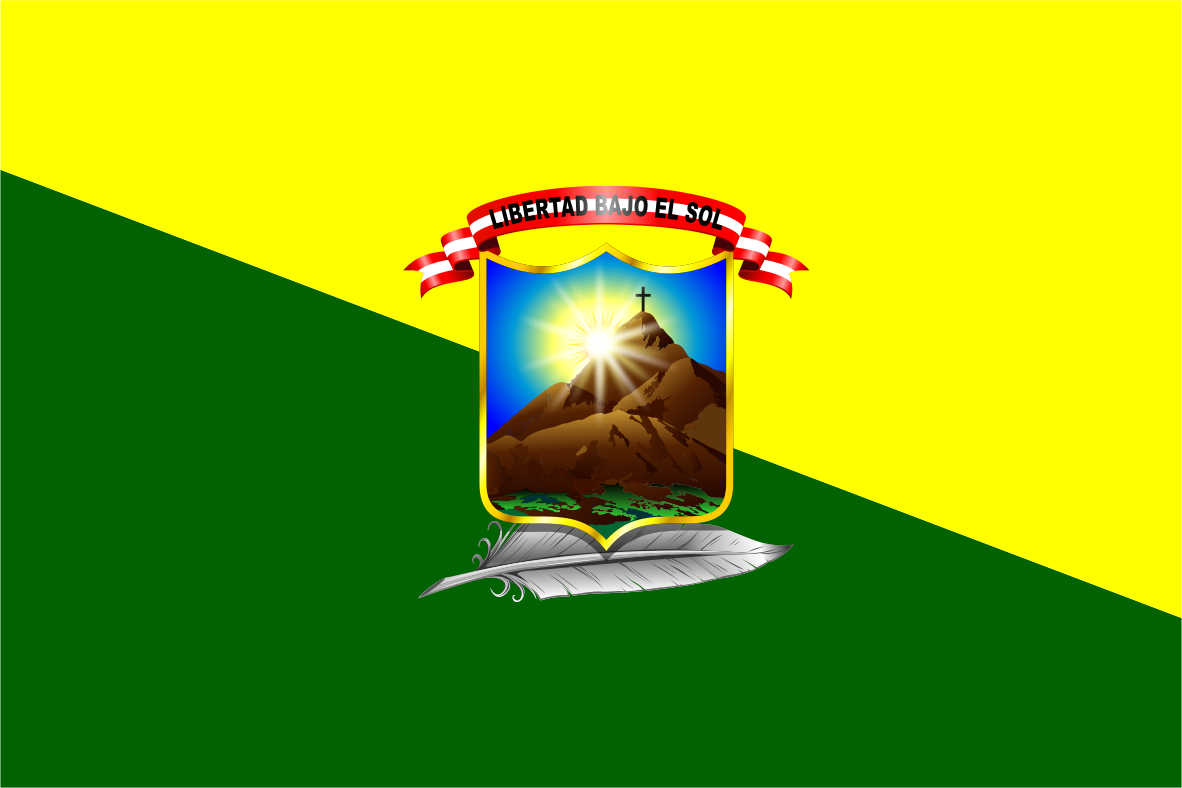
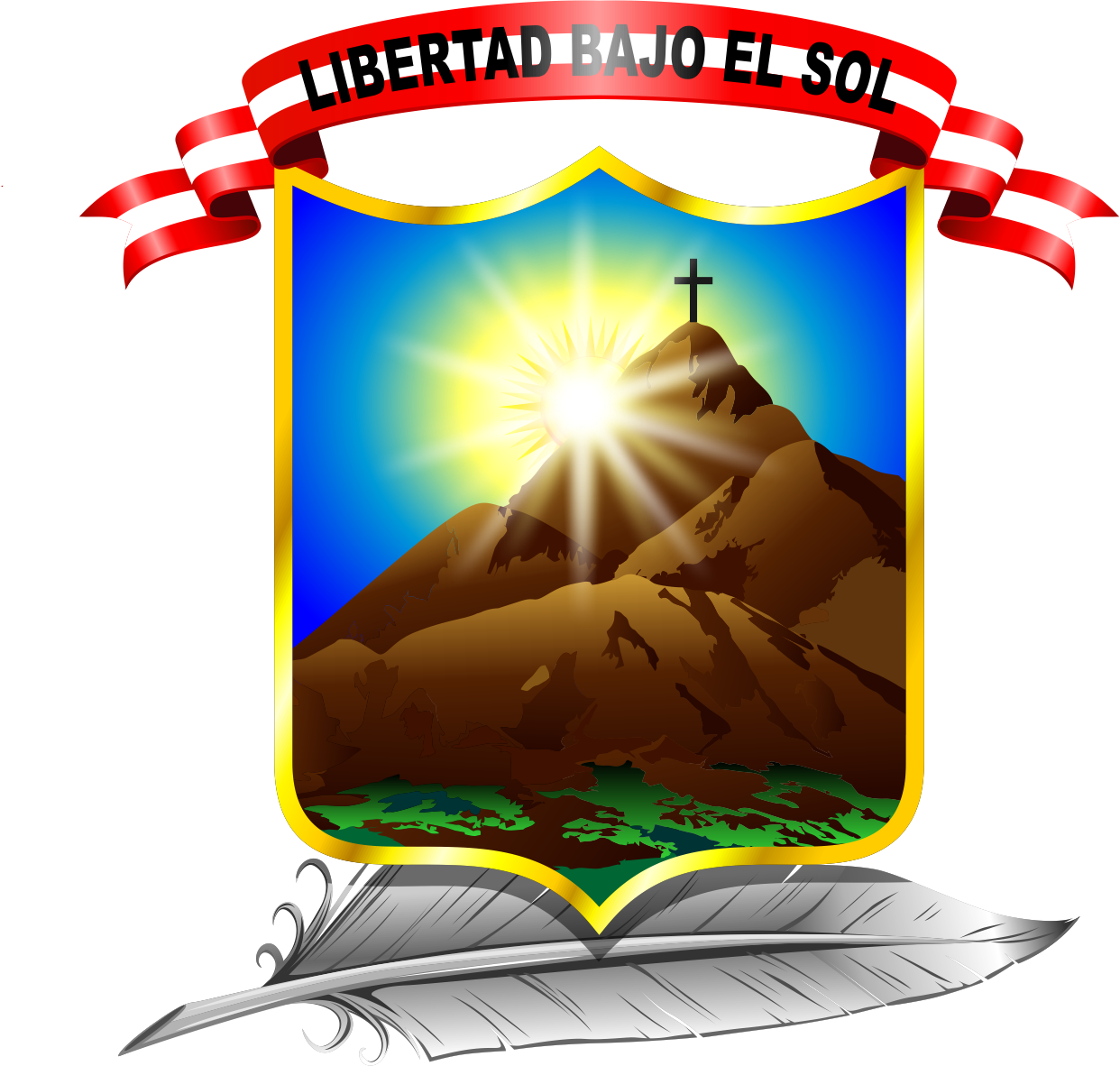
- Flag Coat of arms
- Interactive map of Sayán
- Country: Peru
- Region: Lima
- Province: Huaura
- Capital: Sayán

Government
  - Mayor: Felix Esteban Aquino (2019-2022)

Area
  - Total: 1,310.77 km^{2} (506.09 sq mi)
- Elevation: 685 m (2,247 ft)

Population (2017)
  - Total: 23,408
  - Density: 17.858/km^{2} (46.253/sq mi)
- Time zone: UTC-5 (PET)
- UBIGEO: 150811
- Website: www.munisayan.gob.pe

Sayán District is one of twelve districts of the province Huaura in Peru.
