= Deaths in July 2013 =

The following is a list of notable deaths in July 2013.

Entries for each day are listed alphabetically by surname. A typical entry lists information in the following sequence:

- Name, age, country of citizenship and reason for notability, established cause of death, reference.

== July 2013 ==
=== 1 ===
- Armand Baeyens, 85, Belgian racing cyclist.
- Jack Boles, 88, British Colonial Service officer.
- Sidney Bryan Berry, 87, American military officer, United States Military Academy at West Point chief, heart failure.
- Texas Johnny Brown, 85, American blues musician and songwriter.
- Victor Engström, 24, Swedish bandy player, liver cancer.
- Charles Foley, 82, American toy and board game inventor, co-creator of Twister, complications from Alzheimer's disease.
- Maurice Foley, 83, Australian cricketer and Olympic field hockey player.
- Stoyan Ganev, 57, Bulgarian diplomat and politician, Foreign Minister (1991–1992), President of the United Nations General Assembly (1992–1993), cancer.
- Rolf Graf, 53, Norwegian musician (Lava).
- William H. Gray III, 71, American politician, member of the U.S. House of Representatives from Pennsylvania (1979–1991), House Majority Whip (1989–1991), natural causes.
- David Halvorson, 64, American politician, member of the Montana House of Representatives (since 2013), cancer.
- Paul Jenkins, 74, American actor (The Waltons, Chinatown, Dynasty).
- Ulrich Matschoss, 96, German actor.
- Mita Noor, 42, Bangladeshi actress, suicide by hanging.
- Rolf Nordhagen, 85, Norwegian physicist and computer scientist.
- Barbara Robotham, 77, English mezzo-soprano and voice teacher.
- Bent Schmidt Hansen, 66, Danish footballer (PSV Eindhoven).
- Gary Shearston, 74, Australian singer and songwriter, stroke.
- Maarten van Roozendaal, 51, Dutch singer-songwriter, lung cancer.
- René Sparenberg, 94, Dutch field hockey player.
- Maureen Waaka, 70, New Zealand politician and pageant contestant, Miss World New Zealand (1962), complications from a stroke.
- Ján Zlocha, 71, Slovak footballer.

=== 2 ===
- Anthony G. Bosco, 85, American Roman Catholic prelate, Bishop of Greensburg (1987–2004).
- Gregory Carroll, 35, American operatic tenor, heart attack.
- Hilda Clayton, 22, American combat photographer, mortar shell explosion.
- Emilio Croci-Torti, 93, Swiss cyclist.
- Douglas Engelbart, 88, American scientist, inventor of the computer mouse, kidney failure.
- Fawzia Fuad of Egypt, 91, Egyptian royal, Queen consort of Iran (1941–1948).
- Nilo Floody, 91, Chilean Olympic modern pentathlete (1948, 1952, 1956).
- Armand Gaudreault, 91, Canadian ice hockey player (Boston Bruins).
- Bengt Hallberg, 80, Swedish jazz pianist.
- Sef Imkamp, 88, Dutch politician.
- Noboru Kousaka, 94, Japanese politician.
- Boris Kuznetsov, 78, Russian politician, Governor of Perm Oblast (1991-1996).
- Hugh Lee, 58, Taiwanese Golden Bell-award-winning television actor and theatre director, bowel cancer.
- Anthony Llewellyn, 80, Welsh-born American chemist and astronaut candidate (NASA).
- Paul Lorieau, 71, Canadian national anthem singer (Edmonton Oilers) and optometrist, cancer.
- Victor Lundin, 83, American actor (Robinson Crusoe on Mars).
- Lothar Pongratz, 61, German Olympic bobsledder.
- Theodore Reed, 90, American zookeeper and administrator, director of the National Zoo (1958–1983), complications from Alzheimer's disease.
- Arlan Stangeland, 83, American politician, member of the U.S. House of Representatives from Minnesota (1977–1991) and the Minnesota House of Representatives (1966–1975).

=== 3 ===
- Claude Arabo, 75, French Olympic fencer (1964).
- Thengamam Balakrishnan, 86, Indian politician, journalist and editor (Janayugom), Kerala MLA for Adoor (1970–1975).
- Roman Bengez, 49, Slovenian football player and manager.
- Ray Coates, 89, American football player (New York Giants).
- Vincenzo Cozzi, 86, Italian Roman Catholic prelate, Bishop of Melfi-Rapolla-Venosa (1981–2002).
- Ryan Davis, 34, video game journalist and podcaster, co-founder of Giant Bomb, natural causes.
- Johnny MacRae, 84, American country music composer.
- Azelio Manzetti, 84, Italian prelate, Chief Chaplain of the Sovereign Military Order of Malta.
- Frank Morriss, 85, American film editor (Romancing the Stone, Short Circuit, Blue Thunder).
- John Nunn, 94, British Royal Air Force officer and politician.
- Kenneth Olayombo, 65, Nigerian footballer.
- Maria Pasquinelli, 100, Italian Fascist and murderer.
- Amar Roy Pradhan, 82, Indian politician, MP for Cooch Behar (1977–1999), West Bengal MLA for Mekhliganj (1962–1977).
- Francis Ray, 68, American writer.
- PJ Torokvei, 62, Canadian actor, producer and screenwriter (WKRP in Cincinnati, Real Genius), complications from liver failure.
- Radu Vasile, 70, Romanian politician, historian and poet, Prime Minister (1998–1999) and MP (1992–2004), colon cancer.
- Bernard Vitet, 77, French jazz musician and composer.
- Snoo Wilson, 64, English playwright and screenwriter, heart attack.

=== 4 ===
- Javier Artiñano, 70, Spanish film costume designer.
- John Barrington-Ward, 84, British Olympic sailor.
- Mynampati Bhaskar, 67, Indian writer and journalist.
- Bernardine Bishop, 73, English novelist and teacher, colon cancer.
- Onllwyn Brace, 80, Welsh rugby union player.
- Jim Buck, 81, American dog walker, complications of emphysema and cancer.
- Jack Crompton, 91, English footballer (Manchester United).
- Mahasundari Devi, 82, Indian Madhubani painter and artist, recipient of the Padma Shri award (2011).
- James Fulton, 73, American dermatologist and medical researcher, co-discoverer of Retin-A, colon cancer.
- Willie Hargreaves, 82, English rugby league player (York).
- Charles A. Hines, 77, American military officer, commander of Fort McClellan (1989–1994), heart attack.
- Hung Chung-chiu, 23, Taiwanese soldier, organ failure.
- Tony Licari, 92, Canadian ice hockey player (Detroit Red Wings).
- Innocent Lotocky, 97, Ukrainian-born American Ukrainian Greek Catholic hierarch, Bishop of the Western United States (1981–1993).
- Iain McColl, 59, Scottish actor (City Lights, Gangs of New York, Driving Lessons), complications from cancer.
- Madan Mohan Mishra, 81, Nepalese author.
- Bernie Nolan, 52, Irish singer (The Nolans) and actress, breast cancer.
- Oliver Red Cloud, 93, American Oglala Sioux chief.
- Leslie Lloyd Rees, 94, British prelate, Anglican Bishop of Shrewsbury (1980–1986).
- Pamela Ropner, 82, British author.
- Ahmed Rushdi, 89, Egyptian interior minister (1984–1986).
- Robert L. Rutherford, 74, American general.
- Richard Waters, 77, American artist, inventor of the waterphone.

=== 5 ===
- Akitsugu Amata, 85, Japanese swordsmith.
- Bud Asher, 88, American politician and football coach, Mayor of Daytona Beach, Florida (1995–2003).
- Duane Berentson, 84, American politician, member of the Washington House of Representatives (1962–1980), director of the WSDOT (1981–1993).
- David Cargo, 84, American politician, Governor of New Mexico (1967–1971), member of the New Mexico House of Representatives (1963–1967), complications from a stroke.
- Paul Couvret, 91, Dutch-born Australian politician and military veteran.
- Billy Cross, 84, American football player (Chicago Cardinals, Toronto Argonauts).
- John Curran, 59, American financial journalist and editor (Fortune, Bloomberg News), amyotrophic lateral sclerosis.
- Douglas Dayton, 88, American retail executive, founder of Target Corporation, cancer.
- Alice Masak French, 83, Canadian Inuvialuit author, poet and artist.
- Jean Guy, 90, American First Lady of North Dakota (1961–1973), complications from a stroke.
- Curtis Harnack, 86, American non-fiction author, President of Yaddo (1971–1987).
- Hue Hollins, 72, American NBA referee.
- Robert Lipka, 68, Soviet Union spy in USA.
- Clinton Pattea, 82, American politician, President of the Fort McDowell Yavapai Nation.
- Gwyn Hanssen Pigott, 77, Australian ceramicist, stroke.
- Ama Quiambao, 65, Filipino actress, heart attack.
- William Tebeau, 87, American engineer, first African-American man to graduate from Oregon State University.
- Tito Traversa, 12, Italian climber.
- Daniel Wegner, 65, Canadian-born American social psychologist.
- Lambert Jackson Woodburne, 73, South African vice admiral.
- Sheila Wright, 88, British politician, MP for Birmingham Handsworth (1979–1983).

=== 6 ===
- Erik Ahldén, 89, Swedish Olympic long-distance runner (1948).
- John Chun, 84, North Korean-born American car designer (Shelby Mustang, Tonka Toys), stomach cancer.
- John Hightower, 80, American museum director (Museum of Modern Art 1969–1970, Maritime Aquarium at Norwalk, Mariners' Museum 1993–2007).
- David Johnson, 67, British racehorse owner (Comply or Die), cancer.
- Rudy Keeling, 64, American college basketball coach (University of Maine, Northeastern University), Commissioner of the Eastern College Athletic Conference (2007–2013).
- Santo Krishnan, 93, Indian actor and stunt man.
- Robert Linderholm, 79, American astronomer.
- Lo Hsing Han, 77, Burmese drug trafficker and business tycoon (Asia World), heart failure.
- Thomas F. Malone, 96, American geophysicist.
- Leland Mitchell, 72, American basketball player (New Orleans Buccaneers).
- Tony Naughton, 61, Australian academic.
- Hamilton Nichols, 88, American NFL football player.
- Ruben J. Villote, 80, Filipino Roman Catholic priest and activist.
- Josip Torbar, 91, Croatian politician.
- Senji Yamaguchi, 82, Japanese atomic bomb survivor (Nagasaki) and anti-war activist.

=== 7 ===
- James Bean, 80, American politician, member of the Mississippi Senate (1988–2000), complications from a stroke.
- William Grant Black, 93, American prelate, Bishop of the Episcopal Diocese of Southern Ohio.
- John Bockris, 90, South African–born American scientist.
- Sudhakar Bokade, 57, Indian film producer (Izzatdaar, Saajan), complications from heart attack.
- Berna Carrasco, 98, Chilean chess master.
- Tom Christian, 77, Pitcairn Island radio operator, complications from a stroke.
- Joe Conley, 85, American actor (The Waltons, Cast Away, Mister Ed), complications from dementia.
- MC Daleste, 20, Brazilian rapper, shot.
- Artur Hajzer, 51, Polish climber, fall.
- Robert Hamerton-Kelly, 74, South African-born American Christian theologian and academic.
- Rosalind Hudson, 86, British codebreaker and architectural model maker.
- Donald J. Irwin, 86, American politician, member of the U.S. House of Representatives from Connecticut (1959–1961, 1965–1969), heart failure.
- Barbara Erickson London, 93, American pilot.
- François Xavier Nguyên Quang Sách, 88, Vietnamese Roman Catholic prelate, Bishop of Đà Nẵng (1988–2000).
- Ben Pucci, 88, American football player.
- Charles Quinn, 82, American journalist (NBC News), heart failure.
- Alfred Rozelaar Green, 96, British artist.
- Charles Sowa, 80, Luxembourgish race walker and coach.
- Joan Stambaugh, 81, American philosopher.
- Anna Wing, 98, British actress (EastEnders, Son of Rambow).

=== 8 ===
- Norman Atkinson, 90, British politician, MP for Tottenham (1964–1987).
- Robert Bossenger, 72, South African cricketer.
- Chase, 13, American golden retriever, bat dog and mascot for the Trenton Thunder, cancer.
- Albert Dehert, 91, Belgian footballer (K. Berchem Sport).
- Berhanu Dinka, 78, Ethiopian diplomat and economist, Ambassador to Djibouti, Canada, the U.S. and the United Nations, cancer.
- Paul Feiler, 95, German-born British painter (St. Ives School).
- Dick Gray, 81, American baseball player (Los Angeles Dodgers, St. Louis Cardinals).
- Bob Hardesty, 82, American speechwriter (Lyndon B. Johnson), heart failure.
- Dave Hickson, 83, British footballer.
- James Loper, 81, American television executive (KCET), director of the Academy of Television Arts and Sciences (1984–1999).
- Eunice Macaulay, 90, British-born Academy Award–winning animator.
- Edmund Morgan, 97, American historian and author.
- Joaquín Piña Batllevell, 83, Spanish-born Argentinian Roman Catholic prelate, Bishop of Puerto Iguazú (1986–2006).
- Tunggan Mangudadatu Piang, Filipino politician, ARMM MLA for Maguindanao, heart attack.
- Nadezhda Popova, 91, Russian military pilot, awarded Hero of the Soviet Union.
- Rincón, 33, Brazilian-born Equatorial Guinean footballer, malaria.
- Rubby Sherr, 99, American physicist and academic, member of the Manhattan Project, co-inventor of Fuchs-Sherr modulated neutron initiator.
- Sir Ian Sinclair, 87, British lawyer.
- Sabawi Ibrahim al-Tikriti, 66, Iraqi intelligence officer, half brother of Saddam Hussein, cancer.
- Sundri Uttamchandani, 88, Indian writer.
- Brett Walker, 51, American songwriter, musician and record producer.
- Frank Woodrow Wilson, 89, American politician, member of Louisiana House of Representatives.

=== 9 ===
- Anton Antonov-Ovseyenko, 93, Russian historian and writer.
- Guido Breña López, 82, Peruvian Roman Catholic prelate, Bishop of Ica (1973–2007).
- Markus Büchel, 54, Liechtenstein politician, Prime Minister (1993).
- Arturo Cruz, 89, Nicaraguan economist and politician.
- Andrzej Czyżniewski, 59, Polish footballer, heart attack.
- Fasliyev, 16, American Thoroughbred racehorse and active sire.
- Jim Foglesong, 90, American country music executive (Capitol Records) and producer (Garth Brooks), Country Music Hall of Fame inductee (2004).
- Mary Ellen Hopkins, 79-80, American quilter and author, stroke.
- Kiril of Varna, 59, Bulgarian Orthodox hierarch, Metropolitan of Varna and Veliki Preslav (since 1989), drowning.
- Rasu Madhuravan, 44, Indian Tamil film director, cancer.
- Željko Malnar, 69, Croatian writer and documentarist.
- J. Paul McGrath, 72, American attorney.
- Kirsty Milne, 49, Scottish journalist and academic, lung cancer.
- Andrew Nori, 60-61, Solomon Islands politician and coup leader, Minister for Home Affairs (1984–1988), Minister for Finance (1993–1994).
- Johannes Østtveit, 86, Norwegian politician.
- Marsi Paribatra, 81, Thai royal and artist.
- Robert Pechous, 79, American politician, member of the Illinois House of Representatives (1977–1983).
- Bhagwati Prasad, Indian politician, Uttar Pradesh MLA for Ikauna (1967–1969, 1969–1974), multiple organ failure.
- Barbara Robinson, 85, American children's author (The Best Christmas Pageant Ever), cancer.
- Toshi Seeger, 91, American environmental activist and filmmaker, founder of the Clearwater Festival.
- Gaétan Soucy, 54, Canadian novelist, heart attack.
- Andrea Veneracion, 84, Filipino singer, National Artist (1999), founder of the University of the Philippines Madrigal Singers.
- George Weissbort, 85, Belgian-born British artist.
- Masao Yoshida, 58, Japanese nuclear engineer, chief manager of the Fukushima Daiichi plant during the 2011 nuclear disaster, esophageal cancer.

=== 10 ===
- Ali Hayan, 63, Somali politician.
- Audrey Amiss, 79, British artist.
- Colin Bennetts, 72, British Anglican prelate, Bishop of Coventry (1998–2008), brain tumour.
- Paul Bhattacharjee, 53, British actor (EastEnders, Casino Royale, The Best Exotic Marigold Hotel), suicide by jumping.
- Philip Caldwell, 93, American corporate executive, Chairman and CEO of the Ford Motor Company (1979–1985), complications from a stroke.
- Willem Adriaan Cruywagen, 91-92, South African politician.
- Józef Gara, 84, Polish linguist and Wymysorys language activist.
- Concha García Campoy, 54, Spanish radio and television journalist, leukemia.
- Caroline Duby Glassman, 90, American judge, first woman appointed to the Maine Supreme Judicial Court (1983–1997).
- Kemal Güven, 91-92, Turkish politician, Speaker of the Grand National Assembly (1973–1977).
- Ilan Halevi, 69, French-born Palestinian diplomat and adviser.
- Ana Emilia Lahitte, 91, Argentine writer.
- Gokulananda Mahapatra, 92, Indian science fiction and children's author.
- Dicky Mayes, 90, English cricketer.
- Walter McCaffrey, 64, American activist and politician (New York City Council, 1985–2001), complications from a traffic collision.
- A. K. Narain, 88, Indian historian.
- Ku Ok-hee, 56, South Korean golfer, President of the Korean LPGA (2011–2012), heart attack.
- Paschal O'Hare, 81, Irish solicitor and politician.
- K. V. Ramesh, 78, Indian epigraphist.
- Mabel Sonnier Savoie, 73, American singer and guitar player.
- William Ralph Turner, 93, British painter.
- Ibrahim Youssef, 54, Egyptian Olympic (1984) footballer (Zamalek SC), heart attack.

=== 11 ===
- Zeb Alley, 84, American politician, member of the North Carolina Senate (1971–1973), recipient of Bronze Star Medal.
- Emik Avakian, 90, American inventor.
- Egbert Brieskorn, 77, German mathematician.
- Nookala Chinna Satyanarayana, 89, Indian Carnatic musician.
- Robert Crichton-Brown, 93, Australian businessman.
- Aarne Nuorvala, 101, Finnish jurist.
- Eugene Parks Wilkinson, 94, American naval officer and nuclear power advocate, first CO of the USS Long Beach, founding CEO of the Institute of Nuclear Power Operations.

=== 12 ===
- Mathieu Bénézet, 67, French writer and poet.
- M. Bhaskar, 78, South Indian filmmaker, heart attack.
- Amar Bose, 83, American audio executive, founder of Bose Corporation.
- Derek Brown, 80, Scottish rugby union player.
- Ray Butt, 78, British television director and producer (Only Fools and Horses).
- Pratap Chitnis, Baron Chitnis, 77, British politician, Head of the Liberal Party Organisation (1966–1969).
- Robert Fukuda, 91, American politician and lawyer, member of the Hawaii House of Representatives (1959–1962).
- Antun Kropivšek, 88, Croatian Olympic gymnast.
- Mohammed Adam Mallik, 61, Indian political leader, president of Majlis Bachao Tehreek, cardiac arrest.
- Elaine Morgan, 92, Welsh writer, feminist and evolutionary theorist (The Aquatic Ape).
- Pran, 93, Indian actor, pneumonia.
- Takako Takahashi, 81, Japanese novelist and French language translator, heart failure.
- James L. Voss, 79, American veterinarian and equine specialist, Dean of CSU College of Veterinary Medicine and Biomedical Sciences (1986–2001).
- Alan Whicker, 91, British journalist and broadcaster (Whicker's World), bronchial pneumonia.
- Abu Zahar Ithnin, 74, Malaysian politician, complications from kidney disease.

=== 13 ===
- Henry Paget, 7th Marquess of Anglesey, 90, British nobleman and author.
- Bana, 81, Cape Verdean morna singer and musician, multiple organ failure.
- Bertha Becker, 82, Brazilian geographer.
- John Cowdery, 83, American politician, member of the Alaska House of Representatives (1983–1985, 1997–2000) and Senate (2001–2009).
- Leonard Garment, 89, American lawyer and presidential adviser, central figure in Watergate scandal.
- William E. Glenn, 87, American inventor and academic.
- Louis G. Hill, 89, American politician and judge.
- Henri Julien, 84, French car industrialist (Automobiles Gonfaronnaises Sportives).
- Cory Monteith, 31, Canadian actor (Glee, Kyle XY, Monte Carlo) and singer, heroin and alcohol overdose.
- Ottavio Quattrocchi, 74, Italian businessman, central figure in the Bofors scandal, heart attack.
- Sharmila Rege, 48, Indian sociologist, feminist and author, complications from colon cancer.
- Mona Røkke, 73, Norwegian politician, MP (1977–1989), Justice Minister (1981–1985), cancer.
- Vernon B. Romney, 89, American politician, Utah Attorney General (1969–1977).
- Marc Simont, 97, French-born American children's book illustrator, Caldecott Medal winner for A Tree is Nice (1957).
- George W. Stocking Jr., 84, American historian.
- Kip Tokuda, 66, American politician, member of the Washington House of Representatives (1994–2002), heart attack.

=== 14 ===
- Tonino Accolla, 64, Italian actor and voice actor.
- Herbert M. Allison, 69, American financial executive (Merrill Lynch), Assistant US Secretary of the Treasury (2009–2010), oversaw TARP, heart attack.
- Matt Batts, 91, American baseball player (Boston Red Sox, Detroit Tigers).
- Dennis Burkley, 67, American actor (King of the Hill, The Doors, Murphy's Romance), heart attack.
- Flemming Hansen, 64, Danish Olympic handball player (1972).
- Simmie Hill, 66, American basketball player.
- Thad J. Jakubowski, 89, American Roman Catholic prelate, Auxiliary Bishop of Chicago (1988–2003).
- Jenny Lay, 74, British politician, Lord Mayor of Norwich, cancer.
- Saturnino Rustrián, 70, Guatemalan Olympic road racing cyclist (1968).
- George Smith, 92, British footballer (Manchester City).
- Bill Warner, 44, American motorcycle racer, set land speed record on a conventional motorcycle (2011), motorcycle collision.
- Vladimir Mikhailovich Zakharov, 67, Russian choreographer.

=== 15 ===
- Ninos Aho, 68, Syrian Assyrian poet and activist.
- Gordon Belcourt, 68, American Blackfeet tribal executive and social advocate.
- Henry Braden, 68, American politician, member of the Louisiana State Senate (1978–1984), heart failure.
- Aldo Calderón van Dyke, 45, Honduran journalist and news anchor, poisoning.
- Tom Greenwell, 57, American judge, suicide by gunshot.
- Earl Gros, 72, American football player (Green Bay Packers, Philadelphia Eagles).
- Reiner Kossmann, 86, German Olympic ice hockey player.
- Noël Lee, 88, Chinese-born French-American classical pianist and composer.
- Meskerem Legesse, 26, Ethiopian Olympic runner (2004), heart attack.
- John T. Riedl, 51, American computer scientist, melanoma.
- Sebastião Vasconcelos, 86, Brazilian actor and lawyer, pneumonia.

=== 16 ===
- Robert Ackman, 85, Canadian chemist.
- Nobuyuki Aihara, 78, Japanese gymnast.
- Todd Bennett, 51, British Olympic runner (1988) and silver medalist (1984), cancer.
- Talia Castellano, 13, American internet celebrity, neuroblastoma.
- Alex Colville, 92, Canadian painter.
- Barun De, 80, Indian historian and academic.
- Elmer T. Lee, 93, American drink distiller.
- Torbjørn Falkanger, 85, Norwegian Olympic silver medalist ski jumper (1952).
- T-Model Ford, 93, American blues musician, respiratory failure.
- Sundararajan Krishna, 75, Indian cricketer.
- Mario Laserna Pinzón, 89, French-born Colombian educator, diplomat and politician, Ambassador to France and Austria, Senator (1991–1995), Alzheimer's disease.
- Don McIntyre, 98, Australian football player (Carlton Football Club).
- Frank Moretti, 69, American academic. (death announced on this date)
- Shringar Nagaraj, 74, Indian film producer and actor, kidney failure.
- Carlotta Nobile, 24, Italian art historian, violinist, writer and blogger, melanoma.
- Camilla Odhnoff, 85, Swedish politician, Governor of Blekinge County (1974–1992).
- Hassan Pakandam, 79, Iranian Olympic boxer (1964).
- Yuri Prokhorov, 83, Russian mathematician.
- Marv Rotblatt, 85, American baseball player (Chicago White Sox).
- Brian Sollitt, 74, British inventor, heart attack.

=== 17 ===
- Henri Alleg, 91, British-born French-Algerian journalist.
- Peter Appleyard, 84, British-born Canadian jazz musician and composer, natural causes.
- Vincenzo Cerami, 72, Italian screenwriter (Life Is Beautiful).
- David Collins, 57, Irish restaurant designer (Gordon Ramsay at Royal Hospital Road, The Wolseley), skin cancer.
- Mansour Eid, 69, Lebanese writer. (death announced on this date)
- Adhemar Esquivel Kohenque, 82, Bolivian Roman Catholic prelate, Bishop of Tarija (1995–2004).
- Don Flye, 80, American tennis player.
- Sir Ian Gourlay, 92, British army general, Commandant General Royal Marines (1971–1975).
- Richard James, 87, American politician, member of the Oklahoma House of Representatives (1951–1954).
- Santosh Lal, 29, Indian cricketer, pancreatitis.
- George Lyn, 81, Jamaican politician, MP for North Central Clarendon (1993–2002), complications from a heart attack.
- Briony McRoberts, 56, British actress (Take the High Road), hit by train.
- Slobodan Obradov, 94, Serbian physician.
- Luis Ubiña, 73, Uruguayan footballer.
- Davie White, 79, Scottish football player and manager (Clyde, Rangers, Dundee).

=== 18 ===
- Olivier Ameisen, 60, French-born American cardiologist, myocardial infarction.
- Anatoly Budayev, 44, Belarusian footballer.
- John R. Deane Jr., 94, American military officer, Commanding General of the 173rd Airborne Brigade and US Army Materiel Command.
- Mary Eide, 89, Norwegian politician.
- Ivar P. Enge, 90, Norwegian radiologist.
- Frank Geney, 34, German-born French actor.
- Larry Grathwohl, 65, American informant, spied on Weather Underground for FBI, natural causes.
- Abdul Razak Abdul Hamid, 88, Malaysian academic, sole Malaysian survivor of Hiroshima atomic bomb.
- Francis X. Kane, 94, American space engineer.
- Willie Louis, 76, American key witness in Emmett Till murder trial.
- Kåre Lunden, 83, Norwegian historian.
- John H. Moore II, 85, American senior (former chief) judge, member of the US District Court for Middle Florida (since 1981), Florida Court of Appeals (1977–1981).
- Samar Mukherjee, 99, Indian politician, MP for Howrah (1971–1984), Senator (1986–1993), West Bengal MLA for Howrah (1957–1971), respiratory failure.
- C. Perumal, 62, Indian politician, Tamil Nadu MLA for Yercaud (1989–1996, since 2011), cardiac arrest.
- Vaughn Ross, 41, American convicted murderer, execution by lethal injection.
- Norman Sillman, 92, British sculptor and coin designer.
- Florentinus Sului Hajang Hau, 64, Indonesian Roman Catholic prelate, Bishop of Samarinda (1993), Archbishop of Samarinda (since 2003).
- Vaali, 81, Indian Tamil lyricist, writer, poet and actor.

=== 19 ===
- Richard Carey, 84, American politician, member of the Maine House of Representatives (1967–1978), Maine Senate (1990–1998), mayor of Waterville (1970–1978).
- Paul Côté, 69, Canadian Olympic bronze medallist sailor (1972) and co-founder of Greenpeace.
- Leyla Erbil, 82, Tirkish writer.
- Mikhail Gorsheniov, 39, Russian punk rock musician (Korol i Shut), drug overdose.
- Fritz Griesser, 84, Swiss Olympic sprinter.
- Alan Hunt, 85, Australian politician, member of the Victorian Legislative Council (1961–1992).
- A K Azizul Huq, 84, Bangladeshi civil servant, Comptroller and Auditor General (1983–1989).
- Gordon McKenzie, 86, American Olympic long distance runner (1956, 1960).
- Ulla Mitzdorf, 69, German scientist.
- Geeto Mongol, 82, Canadian professional wrestler (Stampede Wrestling, WWWF).
- Simon Pimenta, 93, Indian Roman Catholic prelate, Archbishop of Bombay (1978–1996), Cardinal (1988–1996).
- Poncie Ponce, 80, American actor (Hawaiian Eye), heart failure.
- Wilf Proudfoot, 91, British politician, businessman and hypnotist, MP for Cleveland (1959–1964); Brighouse and Spenborough (1970–1974).
- Sarvesh Singh Seepu, 35, Indian politician, Uttar Pradesh MLA for Azamgarh (2007–2012), shot.
- Mel Smith, 60, English comedian and actor (Not the Nine O'Clock News, Alas Smith and Jones, The Princess Bride), heart attack.
- Bert Trautmann, 89, German footballer (Manchester City), heart failure.
- Phil Woosnam, 80, Welsh football player, coach and commissioner (NASL, 1968–1982), complications from prostate cancer and Alzheimer's disease.
- Peter Ziegler, 84, Swiss geologist.

=== 20 ===
- Efstathios Alexandris, 92, Greek lawyer and politician, MP (1977–1989), Minister of Justice (1981–1982), Minister for Mercantile Marine (1985–1987).
- John Casablancas, 70, American modeling agent and scout, founder of Elite Model Management, cancer.
- Leonel Duarte, 64, Portuguese Olympic wrestler.
- Pierre Fabre, 87, French pharmaceutical and cosmetics executive, founder of Laboratoires Pierre Fabre.
- André Grobéty, 80, Swiss footballer.
- Khurshed Alam Khan, 94, Indian politician, Governor of Goa (1989–1991) and Karnataka (1991–1999), aortic stenosis.
- Nkosiphendule Kolisile, 40, South African politician, traffic collision.
- Aleksandar Lilov, 80, Bulgarian politician and philosopher.
- Mark Mahowald, 81, American mathematician.
- Oommen Mathew, 73, Indian politician, Kerala MLA for Kuttanad (1980–1982).
- Kotagiri Vidyadhara Rao, 66, Indian politician, Andhra Pradesh MLA for Chintalapudi (1983–2004), cardiac arrest.
- Robert Ritson, 76, Australian politician, member of the South Australian Legislative Council (1979–1993).
- Augustus Rowe, 92, Canadian physician and politician, Newfoundland and Labrador MLA for Carbonear (1971–1975).
- Thomas Salmon, 100, Irish Anglican clergy, Dean of Christ Church Cathedral, Dublin (1969–1990).
- David Spenser, 79, Sri Lankan-born British radio play performer (Just William), actor and producer.
- Helen Thomas, 92, American journalist and author, member of the White House press corps.

=== 21 ===
- Andrea Antonelli, 25, Italian motorcycle racer (World Supersport Championship), race collision.
- Thony Belizaire, 58, Haitian news photographer (AFP), complications from respiratory difficulty.
- Yair Clavijo, 18, Peruvian footballer, cerebral edema.
- Ronnie Cutrone, 65, American artist.
- Det de Beus, 55, Dutch Olympic field hockey champion (1984) and bronze medal-winner (1988), cancer.
- Denys de La Patellière, 92, French film director (Marco the Magnificent) and novelist.
- Lourembam Brojeshori Devi, 32, Indian Olympic judoka (2000), complications from pregnancy.
- Sonny Gandee, 84, American football player (Detroit Lions).
- Irene Gleeson, 68, Australian humanitarian, throat cancer.
- Marvin Price, 81, American Negro league baseball player.
- Ugo Riccarelli, 59, Italian novelist, complications from a heart and lung transplant.
- Luis Fernando Rizo-Salom, 41, Colombian composer, hang–gliding accident.
- Jude Speyrer, 84, American Roman Catholic prelate, Bishop of Lake Charles (1980–2000).
- Vratislav Štěpánek, 83, Czech bishop.
- Fred Taylor, 93, American football coach (Texas Christian University, 1967–1970).
- Rodney Wallace, 64, American football player (Dallas Cowboys).

=== 22 ===
- John Tuson Bennett, 75, Australian solicitor and Holocaust denier.
- Guthrie S. Birkhead Jr., 92, American educator and professor.
- Hugo Black Jr., 91, American attorney.
- Natalie de Blois, 92, American architect.
- Dennis Farina, 69, American actor (Manhunter, Snatch, Law & Order), pulmonary embolism.
- Ramon T. Jimenez, 89, Filipino lawyer.
- Ali Maow Maalin, 59, Somali health worker, last person to survive smallpox, malaria.
- Lawrie Reilly, 84, Scottish footballer (Hibernian F.C., national team).
- Mike Shipley, 56, Australian-born British Grammy Award-winning sound engineer and music producer (Def Leppard), apparent suicide.
- Chandrika Prasad Srivastava, 93, Indian civil servant, Chairman of the SCI, Secretary General of the IMO, recipient of the Padma Vibhushan (2009).
- Keron Thomas, 37, American train thief, heart attack.
- Rosalie E. Wahl, 88, American jurist, member of the Minnesota Supreme Court (1977–1994).

=== 23 ===
- Rona Anderson, 86, Scottish actress (Scrooge, The Prime of Miss Jean Brodie).
- Dragan Babić, 76, Serbian journalist.
- Pauline Clarke, 92, English children's author.
- Arthur J. Collingsworth, 69, American diplomat, complications of bone marrow cancer.
- William P. Costas, 84, American politician, member of the Indiana Senate (1980–1988).
- Dominguinhos, 72, Brazilian composer and singer, infection and cardiac complications.
- Marvin Gray, 58, American murderer and suspected serial killer
- Emile Griffith, 75, U.S. Virgin Island boxer, world middleweight, junior middleweight and welterweight champion, complications from dementia.
- Kim Jong-hak, 61, South Korean television director, suicide by charcoal-burning.
- Pino Massara, 82, Italian musician, composer, record producer and conductor.
- Red McManus, 88, American basketball coach (Creighton University).
- Károly Molnár, 69, Hungarian mechanical engineer and politician, minister without portfolio in charge of research and development (2008–2009).
- Mike Morwood, 62, Australian archaeologist, discoverer of the Flores hobbit, cancer.
- Mohammed Said Nabulsi, 85, Jordanian politician and banker.
- Ulrich Nitzschke, 79, German Olympic boxer.
- Jean Pede, 86, Belgian politician.
- Derek Percy, 64, Australian suspected serial killer and convicted child killer.
- Djalma Santos, 84, Brazilian footballer, two-time World Cup winner (1958, 1962), complications from pneumonia.
- Manjula Vijayakumar, 59, Indian actress, blood clot in the stomach.

=== 24 ===
- Enrique Beotas, 58, Spanish journalist and writer, injures from Santiago de Compostela derailment.
- Garry Davis, 91, American peace activist.
- Fred Dretske, 80, American philosopher and epistemologist.
- Arne Eriksen, 95, Norwegian footballer.
- Ernie Ernst, 88, American assistant district attorney.
- Virginia E. Johnson, 88, American sexologist (Masters & Johnson) and psychologist.
- Pius Langa, 74, South African judge, Chief Justice (2005–2009), member of the Constitutional Court (1994–2009).
- Chiwoniso Maraire, 37, Zimbabwean Mbira singer, lung infection.
- Ryuchi Matsuda, 75, Japanese martial arts writer.
- Adrian Shepherd, 74, British cellist.
- Donald Symington, 88, American actor (Annie Hall, Mighty Aphrodite), Parkinson's disease.
- Jim Underwood, 67, American Guamanian politician, member of the Legislature of Guam (1976–1984).

=== 25 ===
- Steve Berrios, 68, American jazz drummer.
- Mohamed Brahmi, 58, Tunisian politician and opposition leader, MP for Movement of the People (since 2011), shot.
- Peter Bridgeman, 80, British military officer.
- F. John Clendinnen, 88, Australian philosopher of science.
- Walter De Maria, 77, American sculptor (The Lightning Field), stroke.
- Graeme Farrell, 70, Australian cricketer.
- León Ferrari, 92, Argentinian conceptual artist.
- Nic Gotham, 53, Canadian jazz saxophonist and composer (Nigredo Hotel), cancer.
- William J. Guste, 91, American politician, member of the Louisiana Senate (1968–1972), Attorney General of Louisiana (1972–1992).
- Hugh Huxley, 89, British biologist, won Copley Medal (1997).
- Buland Iqbal, 83, Pakistani composer.
- Barnaby Jack, 35, New Zealand computer specialist and security researcher, heroin, cocaine, Benadryl, and Xanax overdose.
- Andrew Lackey, 29, American murderer, execution by lethal injection.
- Bernadette Lafont, 74, French actress (The Mother and the Whore, An Impudent Girl, Le Beau Serge), cardiac arrest.
- Duilio Marzio, 89, Argentinian actor, cardiac arrest.
- Jim McNally, 61, American Major League Baseball umpire.
- Arun Nehru, 69, Indian politician.
- Rick Norton, 69, American football player (Miami Dolphins), heart disease.
- Juan David Ochoa Vásquez, 65, Colombian convicted drug lord, co-founder of Medellín cartel, heart attack.
- Kongar-ol Ondar, 51, Russian Tuvan throat singer, brain hemorrhage.
- Philip Russell, 93, South African primate and Archbishop of Cape Town (1980–1986).
- Hans Tanzler, 86, American politician, mayor of Jacksonville, Florida (1967–1979).

=== 26 ===
- Shafiga Akhundova, 89, Azerbaijani composer.
- Jim Barnett, 86, American politician, member of the Mississippi House of Representatives (1992–2008).
- JJ Cale, 74, American Grammy Award-winning singer-songwriter ("After Midnight", "Cocaine") and musician, heart attack.
- Edna Cisneros, 83, American lawyer.
- Luther F. Cole, 87, American politician and judge, member of the Louisiana House (1964–1966), Louisiana Supreme Court (1986–1992).
- Árpád Duka-Zólyomi, 72, Slovak politician for Hungarian minority, MEP (2004–2009).
- Harley Flanders, 87, American mathematician.
- Marco Antonio Flores, 76, Guatemalan author, natural causes.
- Leighton Gage, 71, American crime author, pancreatic cancer.
- Bellino Giusto Ghirard, 78, French Roman Catholic prelate, Bishop of Rodez (1991–2011).
- Lafif Lakhdar, 79, Tunisian writer and journalist.
- Jon Leyne, 55, British journalist (BBC News), brain tumour.
- Douglas Manley, 91, Jamaican politician, MP for South Manchester (1972–1976).
- George P. Mitchell, 94, American businessman, real estate developer, and pioneer of shale gas technology.
- Bob Savage, 91, American baseball player (Philadelphia Athletics, St. Louis Browns).
- Christoph Scriba, 83, German historian of mathematics.
- Obaid Siddiqi, 81, Indian biologist and academic, traffic collision.
- Sung Jae-gi, 45, South Korean rights activist, drowned.
- Unbridled's Song, 20, American thoroughbred horse, winner of Breeders' Cup Juvenile (1995), euthanized.
- Don Wilbanks, 86, American actor (The Virginian).

=== 27 ===
- Fernando Alonso, 98, Cuban ballet dancer, founder of National Ballet.
- Henryk Baranowski, 70, Polish actor.
- Lindy Boggs, 97, American politician, member of the U.S. House of Representatives from Louisiana (1973–1991), Ambassador to the Holy See (1997–2001), natural causes.
- Sékou Camara, 27, Malian footballer (Pelita Bandung Raya), heart attack.
- Bud Day, 88, American USAF commander (Vietnam War), Medal of Honor recipient.
- Nick Evers, 75, Australian politician, Tasmanian MHA for Franklin (1986–1990).
- Mick Farren, 69, British music journalist, author and singer (The Deviants), heart attack.
- Jóhannes Jónsson, 72, Icelandic businessman (Baugur Group).
- Herb Kaplow, 86, American news correspondent (NBC News, ABC News), stroke.
- Kidd Kraddick, 53, American radio and television personality (Kidd Kraddick in the Morning; Dish Nation), cardiac arrest.
- Suzanne Krull, 47, American actress (Nash Bridges, Race to Witch Mountain, Go), ruptured aortic aneurysm.
- Michel Lemoine, 90, French actor and film director.
- Billy Lewis, 90, Welsh professional footballer.
- John Nunneley, 90, British army officer.
- Julito Rodríguez, 87, Puerto Rican bolero singer, guitarist and composer (Los Panchos).
- Santiago Santamaría, 60, Argentinian footballer (Stade de Reims), heart attack.
- Jacob Immanuel Schochet, 77, Swiss-born Canadian rabbi and scholar.
- Ilya Segalovich, 48, Russian technology executive, co-founder of Yandex, complications from stomach cancer.
- Virginia Tezak, 85, American baseball player.
- Richard Thomas, 87, American ballet teacher and dancer (New York City Ballet), stroke during treatment of pulmonary embolism.
- Pete Tunstall, 94, British RAF squadron leader, World War II POW in Colditz.

=== 28 ===
- Mustafa Adrisi, 91, Ugandan military officer and politician, Vice President (1977–1978).
- William F. Bell, 74, Canadian politician, mayor of Richmond Hill, Ontario (1988–2006).
- Eileen Brennan, 80, American actress (The Last Picture Show, Private Benjamin, Clue), Emmy winner (1981), bladder cancer.
- Frank Castillo, 44, American baseball player (Chicago Cubs), drowning.
- Claude Croté, 75, Belgian footballer.
- Lois DeBerry, 68, American politician, member of the Tennessee House of Representatives (since 1972), pancreatic cancer.
- George Kinzie Fitzsimons, 84, American Roman Catholic prelate, Bishop of Salina (1984–2004).
- Drungo Hazewood, 53, American baseball player (Baltimore Orioles), cancer.
- Syed Tajammul Hussain, 62, Pakistani chemist and physicist.
- Leena Luostarinen, 64, Finnish painter.
- Cleto Maule, 82, Italian cyclist.
- Mykola Melnyk, 59, Ukrainian pilot, liquidator hero.
- Graham Murray, 58, Australian rugby league player and coach, complications from a heart attack.
- Princess Norodom Vichara, 68, Cambodian royal and politician, MP (1998–2003), lung cancer.
- Jagdish Raj, 84, Indian actor, respiratory arrest.
- Rita Reys, 88, Dutch jazz singer, intracranial hemorrhage.
- Otto Schultz, 93, German Luftwaffe ace during World War II and Iron Cross recipient.
- George Scott, 69, American baseball player (Boston Red Sox, Milwaukee Brewers).
- William Scranton, 96, American politician, Governor of Pennsylvania (1963–1967), Ambassador to the United Nations (1976–1977), cerebral hemorrhage.
- Ray Strauss, 85, Australian cricketer.
- Jūgatsu Toi, 64, Japanese travel writer, lung cancer.
- Ersilio Tonini, 99, Italian Roman Catholic prelate, Bishop of Macerata-Tolentino (1969–1975), Archbishop of Ravenna (1975–1990), and Cardinal (since 1994).

=== 29 ===
- Ludwig Averkamp, 86, German Roman Catholic prelate, Bishop of Osnabrück (1987–1994), Archbishop of Hamburg (1994–2002).
- Christian Benítez, 27, Ecuadorian footballer (El Jaish SC, Birmingham City), cardiac arrest.
- Bernard Codd, 79, British motorcycle racer.
- Bobby Crespino, 75, American football player (Cleveland Browns, New York Giants).
- Norman de Mesquita, 81, British sports journalist and broadcaster.
- Peter Flanigan, 90, American investment banker, political campaign manager and presidential adviser.
- Tony Gaze, 93, Australian military officer, RAF World War II flying ace and Grand Prix race car driver.
- Munir Hussain, 83, Pakistani cricketer, journalist and broadcaster, cardiac arrest.
- Rocky Jones, 71, Canadian social activist, heart attack.
- Shivram Dattatray Joshi, 87, Indian Sanskrit scholar.
- Draga Matković, 105, Croatian-born German classical pianist.
- Ole Henrik Moe, 93, Norwegian pianist, art historian and critic.
- Hussain Najadi, 75, Bahraini banker, founder and managing director of AmBank, shot.
- S. N. Hanumantha Rao, 83, Indian cricket umpire.
- Godfrey Stafford, 93, British physicist.
- Sheila Whitaker, 77, British film programmer, director of London Film Festival (1987–1996).

=== 30 ===
- Cecil Alexander, 95, American architect.
- Uwe Bahnsen, 83, German car designer.
- Berthold Beitz, 99, German industrialist (ThyssenKrupp), member of IOC (1972–1988).
- Robert Neelly Bellah, 86, American sociologist, religious academic and author, complications from heart surgery.
- Harry F. Byrd Jr., 98, American politician, member of the United States Senate from Virginia (1965–1983).
- Thomas G. Clines, 84, American CIA agent.
- Ron Dias, 76, American animator (The Chipmunk Adventure, The Secret of NIMH, Who Framed Roger Rabbit) and painter.
- Zyrafete Gashi, 55, Kosovar comedian.
- Álvarez Guedes, 86, Cuban writer and comedian, stomach ailment.
- Sir Reginald Harland, 93, British Royal Air Force commander.
- Myfanwy Horne, 80, Australian journalist, writer, reviewer and book editor.
- İsa Huso, 60, Syrian Kurdish politician, bombing.
- Eko Maulana Ali, 61, Indonesian politician, Governor of Bangka Belitung (since 2007), complications from kidney disease.
- Jim McGregor, 91, American basketball player.
- Jane Belk Moncure, 86, American author of early childhood non-fiction, fiction and poetry.
- Belal Muhammad, 77, Bangladeshi radio broadcaster and independence activist.
- Colm Murray, 61, Irish sports journalist and broadcaster (RTÉ), motor neurone disease.
- Lawrence Nowlan, 48, American sculptor (Espy Award, My VH1 Music Awards, statues of Harry Kalas, Jackie Gleason), natural causes.
- Antoni Ramallets, 89, Spanish footballer.
- Ossie Schectman, 94, American basketball player (New York Knicks).
- Harry Smith, 94, American football player (Detroit Lions) and coach (Saskatchewan Roughriders).
- Jean-Claude Suares, 71, American graphic design artist, heart failure.
- Irene Uchida, 96, Canadian scientist and Down syndrome researcher.
- Antonio Vidal, 85, Cuban artist.
- Benjamin Walker, 99, Indian-born British author.
- Gene Wettstone, 100, American gymnastics coach (Penn State University, USA Gymnastics).

=== 31 ===
- Michael Ansara, 91, Syrian-born American actor (Broken Arrow, Star Trek, Batman: The Animated Series), complications from Alzheimer's disease.
- Earl Barbry, 62, American Tunica-Biloxi tribal leader, Chairman (since 1978), cancer.
- William J. Cousins, 89, American sociologist.
- Michel Donnet, 96, British-born Belgian military officer, RAF wing commander during World War II.
- John Graves, 92, American author (Goodbye to a River).
- Judge Hughes, 69, American football player and coach, diabetes.
- Gail Levin, 67, American documentary film director, breast cancer.
- Corey Maclin, 43, American television broadcaster, announcer, play-by-play commentator and politician, car crash.
- Jean Madiran, 93, French nationalist writer.
- Mary Matz, 81, American theologian.
- Wendell Alverson Miles, 97, American senior judge of the US District Court for Western Michigan (1974–2008), US Foreign Intelligence Surveillance Court (1989–1996).
- Antonio Moreno Casamitjana, 86, Chilean Roman Catholic prelate, Archbishop of Concepción (1989–2006).
- Hirohiko Nakamura, 70, Japanese politician.
- David Stockings, 67, English cricketer (Norfolk).
- Trevor Storer, 83, English businessman and entrepreneur, founder of Pukka Pies.
- Gerald W. Thomas, 94, American academic, President of New Mexico State University (1970–1984).
- Alvis Wayne, 75, American rockabilly musician, liver cancer.
- Jon Manchip White, 89, Welsh–born American novelist and screenwriter.
