= Mynampati =

Mynampati is a Telugu surname. Notable people with the name include:

- Mynampati Bhaskar, writer and a journalist from Andhra Pradesh
- Ram Mynampati, Indian business executive
- Sreerama Chandra Mynampati, Indian singer
