= Antonio Vidal =

Antonio Vidal may refer to:

- Antonio Vidal (footballer) (1923–1999), Spanish football forward
- Antonio Vidal (artist) (1928–2013), Cuban artist
- Antonio Vidal González, Argentine football forward

== See also ==
- Antonio Vidal-Puig, Spanish medical doctor and scientist
