= Jorge Carrión Pavlich =

Peruvian Roman Catholic bishop (1950–2026)

The Most Reverend Jorge Carrión Pavlich
- Bishop of Puno
- Church: Roman Catholic Church
- Archdiocese: Arequipa
- Diocese: Puno
- Appointed: 25 March 2000
- Installed: 7 May 2000
- Term ended: 31 October 2026
- Predecessor: Jesús Mateo Calderón Barrueto
- Successor: Sede vacante

Orders
- Ordination: 15 August 1976
- Consecration: 7 May 2000 by Augusto Vargas Alzamora, Luis Sánchez-Moreno Lira, Rino Passigato

Personal details
- Born: 25 May 1950 Tarma, Junín Region, Peru
- Died: 31 October 2026 (aged 76) Lima, Peru
- Motto: Mihi enim vivere Christus est

Jorge Pedro Carrión Pavlich (25 May 1950 – 31 October 2026) was a Peruvian Roman Catholic prelate who served as the bishop of Puno from 2000 until his death in 2026. Before his episcopal appointment, he served as apostolic administrator of the Diocese of Puno and held positions within the Peruvian Episcopal Conference.

== Early life and education ==
Carrión Pavlich was born on 25 May 1950 in Tarma, in the Junín Region of Peru. He began his ecclesiastical education at the Minor Seminary of Tarma before pursuing higher studies at the Pontifical Urban University in Rome and subsequently at the University of Bamberg in Germany.

== Priesthood ==
Carrión Pavlich was ordained a priest on 15 August 1976. During his early ministry, he served as a parish priest in Pasco, in the Diocese of Tarma, and was a member of the diocesan College of Consultors. He subsequently worked for the Peruvian Episcopal Conference, where he served as deputy secretary and later as vice-secretary. At the time of his appointment as bishop, he was also president of the conference's economic committee.

On 14 February 1998, he was appointed apostolic administrator of the Diocese of Puno.

== Episcopacy ==
On 25 March 2000, Pope John Paul II appointed Carrión Pavlich bishop of Puno, succeeding Jesús Mateo Calderón Barrueto. He received his episcopal consecration on 7 May 2000 in the Cathedral of Puno. The principal consecrator was Cardinal Augusto Vargas Alzamora, then Archbishop of Lima.

Carrión Pavlich subsequently led the Diocese of Puno for more than 26 years, becoming one of the longest-serving bishops in the diocese's history. During his episcopal ministry, he was involved in pastoral activities in the region and in the work of the Peruvian Episcopal Conference.

== Death ==
Carrión Pavlich died in Lima on 31 October 2026, at the age of 76, after being hospitalised in the city. His death was publicly announced on 1 November during a Mass at the Sanctuary of the Virgin of Candelaria in Puno.

His funeral arrangements included a wake in Lima, followed by ceremonies in Puno. His remains were subsequently scheduled to be transferred to his hometown of Tarma for burial.

Catholic Church titles
Preceded by Jesús Mateo Calderón Barrueto	Bishop of Puno; 2000–2026	Succeeded by Sede vacante
