= Gail Levin =

Gail Levin may refer to:

- Gail Levin (art historian) (born 1948), an American art historian
- Gail Levin (filmmaker) (1946–2013), an American documentary filmmaker
