= Salvador Herrera Pinto =

Peruvian Catholic prelate (1890–1977)

Monsignor Salvador Herrera Pinto O.F.M.
- Titular Bishop of Puno
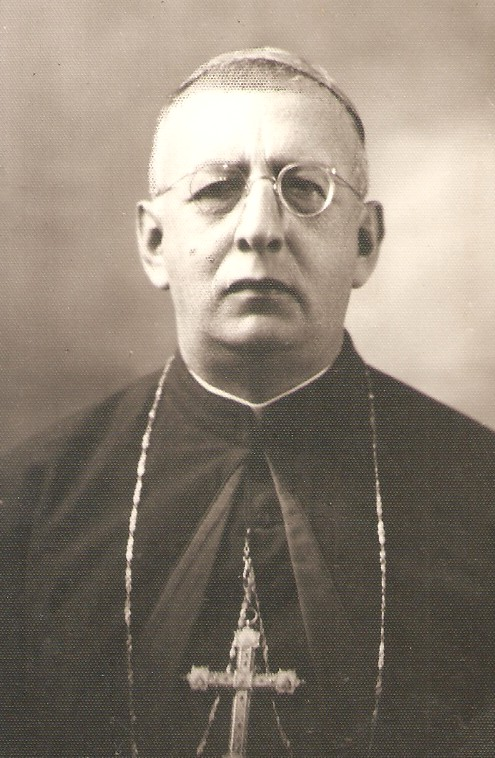
- Church: Catholic Church
- Diocese: Puno
- Installed: December 21, 1933
- Term ended: April 5, 1948
- Predecessor: Alberto Maria Dettmann
- Successor: Fedel María Cosió, OP

Orders
- Ordination: October 28, 1914 by Mariano Holguín

Personal details
- Born: February 3, 1890 Abancay, Peru
- Died: January 26, 1977 (aged 86) Lima, Peru
- Buried: Cathedral of Cuzco
- Denomination: Roman Catholicism

Salvador Herrera Pinto OFM (February 3, 1890 – January 26, 1977) was a Peruvian Roman Catholic prelate who served as Titular Bishop of Puno from 1933 to 1948. A Doctor of Theology, he was also a polyglot and a writer.

== Biography ==
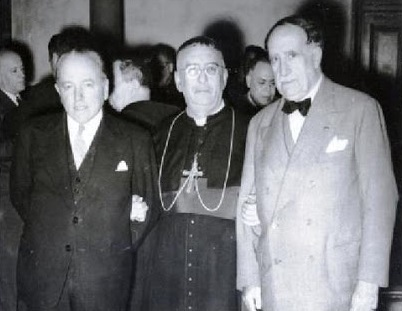
Herrera accompanied by Raúl Porras Barrenechea and Víctor Andrés Belaúnde.

Salvador Herrera Pinto was born on February 3, 1890, in the city of Abancay, to parents Rufino Herrera and Josefa Pinto. His father was a parliamentarian for Aymaraes Province under the presidencies of Andrés Avelino Cáceres and Nicolás de Piérola. He entered the Recoleta convent of Cuzco in 1902. On April 23, 1908, he made profession of vows and on May 2, 1911, he fulfilled the solemn vows of the Franciscan Order. On October 28, 1914, he was ordained as a priest in the city of Arequipa, receiving the respective Orders from Mariano Holguín. He celebrated his first mass in the same city on November 8, 1914, and for his second mass he traveled to his native Abancay, where he celebrated it on January 17, 1915.

His proficiency in theology and languages took him to Europe, taking courses at the Catholic University of Louvain and the University of Fribourg from where he received a Doctorate of Theology in 1920. He traveled through Italy and was received in Rome by Pope Benedict XV. After obtaining his doctorate, he continued his stay in Europe in pursuit of his achievements and studies of Greek, Hebrew and Latin. He went to Germany to continue his studies and learn German, witnessing a series of turbulent periods of German history, such as the effects of the aftermath of World War I, the rise and fall Weimar Republic and Adolf Hitler's rise to power. On December 21, 1933, Pope Pius XI appointed him Titular Bishop of the Diocese of Puno in Peru, being consecrated for this purpose on May 20, 1934, and taking possession of its episcopal see on May 31 of the same year.

In his capacity as Bishop of Puno, he was Secretary General of the Episcopal Conference of Peru from 1934 to 1935 and from 1935 to 1936. In 1935 he was a prominent participant in the First National Eucharistic Congress held in the city of Lima.

He was a notable polyglot, knowledgeable in both classical (Greek, Hebrew and Latin), modern (English, French, Italian, German) and Andean (Quechua, Aymara) languages, the latter of which he learned since his childhood in Quechua-speaking Apurímac.

On April 5, 1948, he stepped down as Bishop of Puno and was honorably named Titular Bishop of the Diocese of Satala in Armenia (modern Turkey).

In 1953 he was appointed president of the Committee for the Pontifical Coronation of the Virgin of the Miracle in Lima, a coronation that was carried out by the Apostolic Nuncio Monsignor Fernando Cento at the request of Pope Pius XII.

In 1966, he wrote La Cuna de Ricardo Palma, a book that questions the veracity of the claim that Ricardo Palma was born in Lima, instead naming the town of Talavera de la Reyna as his birthplace.

He died at the Convent of Our Lady of the Angels on January 26, 1977.

== See also ==
- Roman Catholic Diocese of Puno
