= Graeme Farrell =

Graeme Farrell can refer to:

- Graeme Farrell (South Australia cricketer) (1943–2013), Australian cricketer
- Graeme Farrell (Tasmania cricketer) (born 1947), Australian cricketer
