= Károly Molnár =

Károly Molnár may refer to:

- Károly Molnár (academic)
- Károly Molnár (judoka)
