= Alvis Wayne =

American singer (1937–2013)

Alvis Wayne (December 31, 1937 – July 31, 2013) was an American rockabilly singer.

== Career ==
Alvis Wayne Samford was born in Paducah, Texas and listened to country music on the radio as a child and was given a guitar at age ten. He began playing in local bars and clubs at 12 and joined Tony Wayne & the Rhythm Wranglers at 20. This group released one single in 1957 and then disbanded. Following this, Alvis signed with Westport Records.

He recorded enough for Westport to put out an LP; though none were released, his single "Don't Mean Maybe Baby" was a regional hit in Texas, and he toured extensively in the state. He put his career in music on hold and joined the Air Force in 1960; after his tour of duty, he continued recording and performing. In the 1970s, he wrote and recorded the song I Wanna Eat Your Pudding for the rockabilly revival label Rollin' Rock Records. The song (which contained bawdry lyrics with references to interracial oral sex) was included in the soundtrack (and on the soundtrack album) of the X-rated feature-length movie Teenage Cruisers.

In subsequent decades, Alvis became the subject of a cult following in the United Kingdom, where his singles were in great demand. In 2000, Wayne signed with Rolling Rock Records and released two full-length albums, Rockabilly Daddy (2000) and Proud of My Rockabilly Roots (2001).

== Singles ==
Year	Title	Record label
1956	Swing Bop Boogie / Sleep Rock-A-Roll Rock-A-Baby	Westport Records
1957	Don’t Mean Maybe, Baby / I’d Rather Be With You	Westport Records
1958	Lay Your Head On My Shoulder / You Are The One	Westport Records
	I Gottum	Not issued
