= Lafif Lakhdar =

French-Tunisian writer and journalist (1934–2013)

Lafif Lakhdar (also written "Al-Afif Al-Akhdar" or "Afif Lakhdar") was a French-Tunisian writer and journalist. He was born the 6th of February 1934 in Maktar and died the 26th of July 2013.

== Life ==
Lafif Lakhdar was born into a very poor family. He studied in a madrasa and applied the University of Ez-Zitouna in Tunis; he became a lawyer in 1957. He left Tunisia in 1961 and moved to Algeria, where he was one of Ahmed Ben Bella's close friends. He began a long journey throughout the Middle East. In 1979 he settled in France.

As a leftist thinker he took part to the debate on secularism in Muslim countries. As a journalist he worked for several newspapers : Al-Hayat, Al-Quds Al-Arabi and more recently for the online magazine Elaph.

== Books ==
- The Position on Religion (in Arabic), Dar al-Tali'a, Beyrouth, 1972.
- L'organisation moderne, Dar Al-Tali'a, Beyrouth, 1972.
- Mohamed Abd El Motaleb Al Houni, L'impasse arabe. Les Arabes face à la nouvelle stratégie américaine, Preface by L. Lakhdar, Paris, L'Harmattan, 2004 (ISBN 978-2747570411)
- Min Muhammad al-iman ila Muhammad at-tarikh ("Muhammad: From Faith to History"), Al-Kamel Verlag, Cologne, 2014.

== Selected articles ==
- "Moving From Salafi to Rationalist Education," in The Middle East Review of International Affairs (Volume 9, No. 1, Article 3, March 2005).

== Bibliography ==
- Shaker Al-Nabulsi, The Devil's Advocate : A Study of Al-Afif Al-Akhdar's Thought, Beyrouth, Arab Institute for Research & Publishing, 2005 (ISBN 9953-36-791-4)
