= MC Daleste =

Brazilian musician (1992–2013)

Background information
- Born: Daniel Pedreira Sena Pellegrine; 30 October 1992; São Paulo, Brazil
- Died: 7 July 2013 (aged 20) Paulínia, São Paulo, Brazil
- Genres: Funk paulista; Latin rap
- Occupations: Singer; songwriter; rapper
- Years active: 2009–2013
- Label: Detona Funk

Daniel Pedreira Sena Pellegrine (30 October 1992 – 7 July 2013), better known by his stage name MC Daleste, was a Brazilian funk paulista singer, songwriter and rapper.

== Early life and career ==
MC Daleste was born on 30 October 1992 in Penha, São Paulo, Brazil. He began his career in 2009, composing his first funk songs and had his first hit after releasing "Pedra da Exaltação".

== Death ==
Daleste was fatally shot in the abdomen while performing during a free show at 22:40 BRT on 6 July 2013 in Campinas, São Paulo. He died later the following day, at 0:55 BRT, in Paulínia's City Hospital. Police in Campinas claim to be continuing to investigate the shooting with approximately one hundred testimonials, videos, and photos received. A number of pictures taken from the stage have been deemed fundamental to the case by an investigator.

The Brazilian funk scene has turned violent within the last couple of years, with a number of MCs being killed including MC Zói De Gato, Felipe Boladão, MC Careca, MC Primo, and MC Duda Marapé, in addition to Daleste.

His life and death are depicted in the 2024 Globoplay documentary series MC Daleste - Mataram o Pobre Loco.

== Discography ==
=== Albums ===
- Inquebrável (2013)

=== Singles ===
(selective)

- "Angra dos Reis"
- "Apologia"
- "Todas as Quebradas 1"
- "Todas as Quebradas 2"
- "Todas as Quebradas 3"
- "Todas as Quebradas 4"
- "Todas as Quebradas 5"
- "Mais Amor, Menos Recalque"
- "Mãe de Traficante"
- "Voz Estranha"
- "Água na Boca"
- "Ipanema"
- "Quem é?"
- "O Gigante Acordou!"
- "Deusa da Ostentação"
- "Ostentação Fora do Normal" (part. MC Léo da Baixada)
- "São Paulo"
- "Em Teu Olhar"
- "Nunca Vendeu Maconha"
- "Voz Estranha"
- "Pra Ser Fiel"
- "Fase Boa"
- "Verdadeira Namorada"
- "Apologia"
- "Paquera de Escola"
- "Bonde Dos Menor"
- "A Quebrada Tá Assim"
- "Pensamentos Trancados"
- "Heróis da Favela"
- "Violentamente"
- "Dia de Visita"
- "Eu Amo Minha Quebrada"
- "Gosto Mais do que Lasanha"

== See also ==
- List of unsolved murders (2000–present)
- List of murdered hip hop musicians
- Deaths in July 2013
