= Diocese of Puno =

Catholic diocese in Peru

Diocese of Puno Dioecesis Puniensis

Catholic
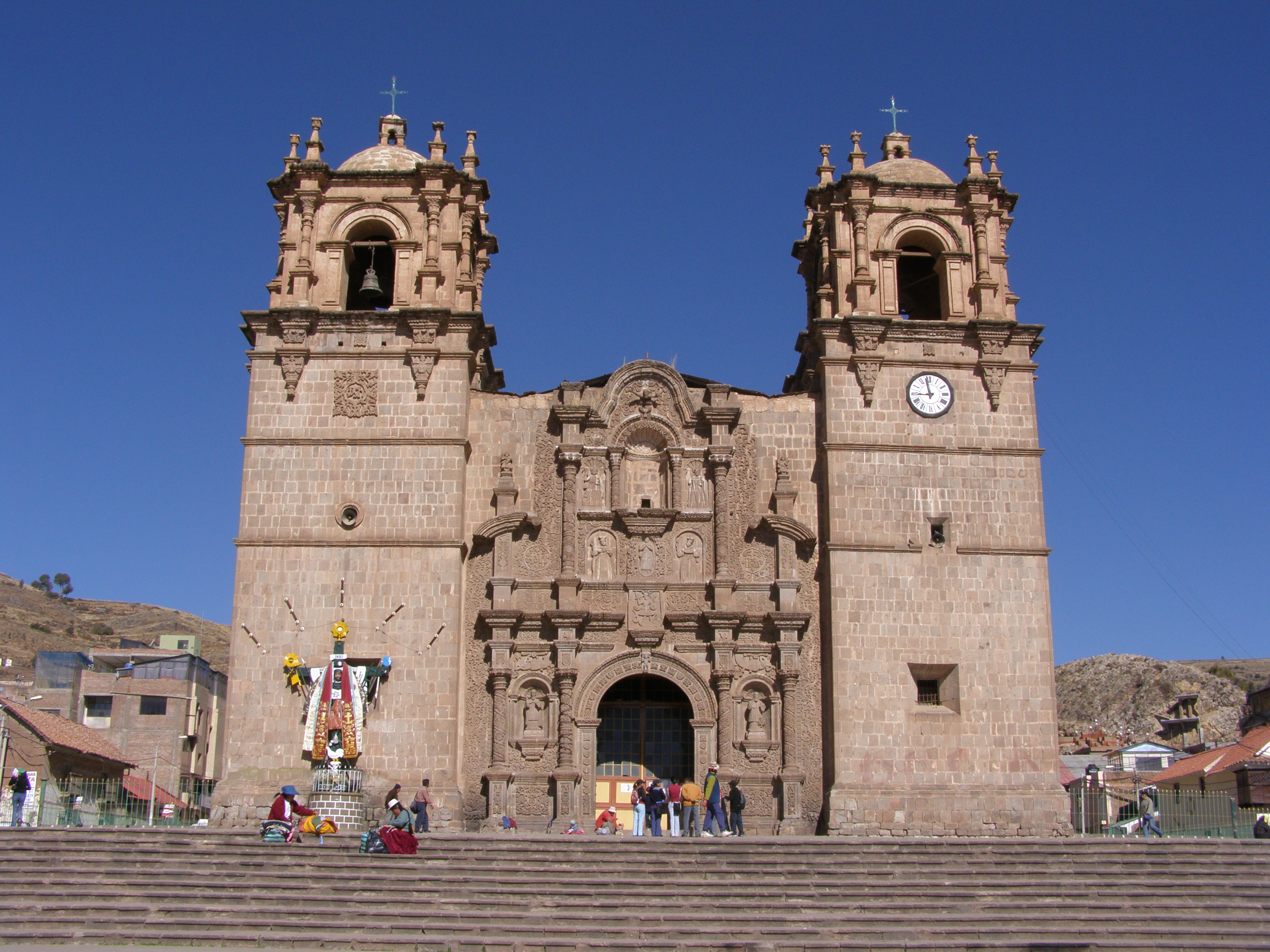
- Cathedral Basilica of St. Charles Borromeo

Location
- Country: Peru
- Ecclesiastical province: Arequipa

Statistics
- Area: 19,475 km^{2} (7,519 sq mi)
- Population: Total; Catholics: (as of 2004); 606,096; 515,182 (85.0%)

Information
- Sui iuris church: Latin Church
- Rite: Roman Rite
- Cathedral: Catedral Basílica San Carlos Borromeo

Current leadership
- Pope: Leo XIV
- Bishop: Vacant

Map

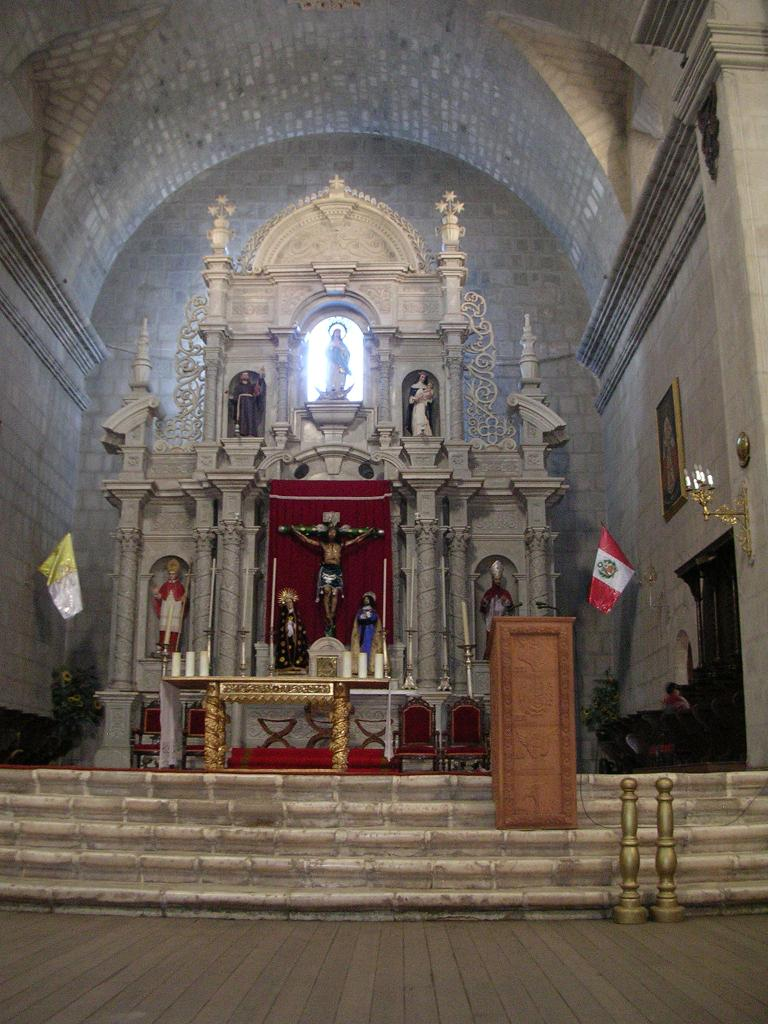
Cathedral interior

The Diocese of Puno (Latin: Puniensis) is a Latin Church diocese of the Catholic Church located in the city of Puno in the ecclesiastical province of Arequipa in Peru.

== History ==
- 7 October 1861: Established as Diocese of Puno from the Diocese of Cusco

== Leadership ==
- Bishops of Puno (Roman rite)
  - Bishop Mariano Chacón Becerra (17 June 1861 – 1864)
  - Bishop Juan María Ambrosio Huerta (2 November 1864 – 1873)
  - Bishop Pedro José Chávez (25 July 1875 – 11 March 1879)
  - Bishop Juan Capistrano Estévanes, O.F.M. (23 March 1880 – 1 October 1880)
  - Bishop Ismael Puyrredón (14 February 1889 – 28 August 1907), appointed Titular Archbishop after resignation
  - Bishop Valentín Ampuero, C.M. (16 March 1909 – 30 September 1914)
  - Bishop Fedel María Cosió y Medyna (7 January 1923 – 14 May 1933)
  - Bishop Salvador Herrera y Pinto, O.F.M. (21 December 1933 – 5 April 1948)
  - Bishop Alberto Maria Dettmann y Aragón, O.P. (28 June 1948 – 6 February 1959), appointed Bishop of Ica
  - Bishop Julio González Ruiz, S.D.B. (2 March 1959 – 1 July 1972)
  - Bishop Jesús Mateo Calderón Barrueto, O.P. (3 November 1972 – 14 February 1998)
  - Fr. Jorge Pedro Carrión Pavlich (14 February 1998 – 25 March 2000), Apostolic Administrator
  - Bishop Jorge Pedro Carrión Pavlich (25 March 2000 – 31 October 2026)

== See also ==
- Catholic Church in Peru

== Sources ==
- GCatholic.org
- Catholic Hierarchy
