= David Halvorson =

American politician

Member of the Montana House of Representatives from the 37th district
- In office 2013

Personal details
- Born: July 9, 1947 Sidney, Montana
- Died: July 1, 2013 (aged 64) Sidney, Montana
- Party: Republican

David Philip Halvorson (July 9, 1948 – July 1, 2013) was an American politician.

Born in Sidney, Montana, Halvorson graduated from Williston High School in Williston, North Dakota. Halvorson received his bachelor's degree in accounting from the University of North Dakota and was in ROTC. He went to the United States Military Academy for two years for military training and studies. He then returned to Montana and was in the radio business. He was also a wheat farmer. Halvorson served in the Montana House of Representatives as a Republican from 2013 until his death from cancer. He died in Sidney, Montana.
