= Mariano Holguín =

Peruvian archbishop

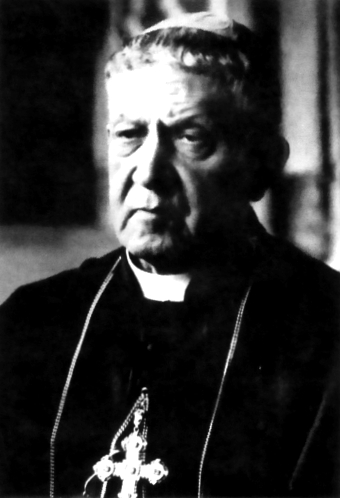
Holguín

Mariano Emilio Holguin y Maldonado (October 5, 1860 – December 24, 1945) was a Peruvian archbishop who served as acting president of Peru for six hours on March 1, 1931.
