= Vladimir Mikhailovich Zakharov =

Vladimir Mikhailovich Zakharov (Russian: Влади́мир Миха́йлович Заха́ров; 5 July 1946 – 14 July 2013) was a Russian choreographer, founder, Chief Choreographer and Artistic Director of Moscow National Academic Theater of Dance Gzhel and Moscow Ballet Academy Gzhel, Ph.D. in Study of Culture, Academician, Director of the University of Dance under the Academy of Slavic Culture, People's Artist of the Russian Federation, Honoured Artist of Dagestan Republic, People's Artist of The North Ossetia-Alaniya Republic.

== Biography ==
Vladimir M. Zakharov was born on 5 July 1946 in a small Russian village of Murzitsy in the Sechenovsky District.

From 1960 to 1964 he studied at Choreography Department of Kaliningrad(Sovetsk-town) Regional College of Culture. After he had graduated from the college, he studied several years at Leningrad.

After graduating from the Institute in 1969, he started his professional career as Chief Choreographer with Volzhsky National Russian Folk Choir in Kuybishev city (now Samara city) on the Volga River.

From 1970 until his death in 2013, Vladimir Zakharov successfully developed his career in choreography and ballet education. For three years (1970–1973) he worked as choreography coach at the College of Arts in Kirov city (now Vyatka city). In 1974 he staged choreography pieces for Ossetian Dance Group "Alan" in Ordzhonikidze (now Vladikavkaz). From 1973-1974 he was teaching choreography at Samara University of Culture.

He also started his career as ballet administrator with the Ministry of Culture of Russia (1974–1975).

From 1975 to 1980 Vladimir worked as a Chief Choreographer of the Soviet Army Dance and Song Theatre in Dresden, East Germany.

It was in 1980 when he created together with famous singer Alexandra Prokoshina, the Russian Folk Dance and Song Group "Iskorka" (i.e. "sparkly" ) in Kotelnichesky oblast(region) of Vyatka-city. He worked with Iskorka till 1986.

At the same time (1986–1988), Vladimir Zakharov headed and administrated national choreography at Rosconcert (i.e.all Russian concert - organizing administration) in Moscow.

At that time he was recognized as one of the leading Russian national choreographers: he was merited by his first national title of "Honoured Artist of Russia" and staged the official government concert at the Kremlin Palace of Congresses in 1987.

In 1988 Vladimir Zakharov founded his theatre of dance "GZHEL" (now Moscow National Academic Theatre of Dance "GZHEL").

Since that time, his creative spirit and ideas, professional career, administrative skills, profound cultural knowledge and high educational mastercraft in ballet and choreography - he devoted to the Theatre of Dance Gzhel, to young ballet "sparkles" formation through the Ballet Academy he established under the Theatre Gzhel and to the global promotion of Russian Ballet and Russian National Culture and Traditions.

- In 1994, he created University of Dance under the State Academy of Slavic Culture and became a Dean.
- In 1998, he founded Moscow Ballet Academy Gzhel under the Theatre of Dance Gzhel.
- Due to his academic efforts, in 1999 the Theatre was awarded by the Government the title "Academic" for achievements in ballet and choreography education.
- In 2010, he founded a new Classical Ballet Group "Divertissement" under the Theatre of Dance Gzhel.

=== Death ===
On 14 July 2013, Zakharov died at the age of 67.

== Awards and titles ==
Russian national honorary titles

- 1986 - Honoured Artist of the Russian Federation;
- 1992 - People's Artist of the Russian Federation;
- 2009 - Honoured Artist of Dagestan Republic;
- 2011 - People's Artist of the North Ossetia-Alaniya Republic

Russian national honorary awards

- 1997 - Medal of "850 years of Moscow" for the merits in culture;
- 1997 - Order of "People Friendship" by President of RF;
- 2003 - Prize and Award of Moscow Government;
- 2004 - Order of St. Alexander Nevsky;
- 2004 - Medal of "Work for Motherland";
- 2006 - Peter The Great Award for the merits in Russian culture;
- 2006 - Order of "Merits before Motherland" by President of RF;
- 2008 - RF Government Award for concert programs promoting Russian traditional crafts;

Orthodox Church honorary awards

- 2005 - A testimonial of St. George by the Ukrainian Orthodox Church International Charity

Organization for the deeds for the Church and for promoting and revival of historical Slavic traditions;

- 2005 - Prize of Saints Cyril and Methodius by Patriarch of All Russia Alexis II for

keeping and developing of Sts. Cyril and Methodius heritage, international peace and friendship;

- 2006 - Medal of Prelate Innokenty, Metropolite of Moscow and Kolomna and

Award of Patriarch of Moscow and All Russia Alexis II;

- 2010 - Order of St. Nicholas by the Ukrainian Orthodox Church

International honorary awards and titles

- 2004 - Chairman of Russian United Committee for CIOFF and IOV, associated to UNESCO;
- 2004 - Award of Laureate of International Public Charity Foundation "For Peace and People";
- 2004 - Medal of E.Rosse(Russian choreographer) "Service for Children Choreography";
- 2006 - Order of "Unity" of UN European Committee;

Academic degrees, titles and awards

- 1994 - Professor;Director of University of Dance under the State Academy of Slavic Culture (SASC);RF
- 1996 - Academician of the State Academy of Slavic Culture (SASC), RF;
- 2003 - Artistic Director of Moscow Ballet Academy Gzhel under the Theatre Gzhel;
- 2004 - Academician of the International Plato's Academy (Greece);
- 2005 - Degree of Ph.D. in Study of Culture;

Artistic organizations, journals, competition prizes and awards

- 1998 - "Lord of Dance" Nomination and Prize by "Ballet" Magazine, RF;
- 2001 - All-Russian Dance Festival and Choreographers Competition for Vladimir Zakharov's Prise

was founded in Vyatka by the Ministry of Culture of RF, Ministry of Education of RF, State Russian House of People Creative Work.

Publications (books, treatises)

- 2004 - Monograph (book) "Poetry of Russian Dance" Vol.1 and Vol.2 (in Rus. lang);
- 2009 - Monograph (book)"Poetry of Russian Dance" Vol.3 and Vol.4 (in Rus. lang);

== Works ==
Staged ballets, concert programs for the Theatre of Dance Gzhel

More than 100 choreography works and compositions were created for the below concert programs:

- 1998 concert program "Hello, Folks!" (Russian: Здравствуйте, люди добрые
- 2000 concert program "Love, Russia!"(Russian: Я люблю тебя, Россия)
- 2002 concert program "From Russia with Love" (Russian: Из России с любовью)
- 2003 concert program "Moscow, the Gold-Domed" (Russian: Москва Златоглавая)
- 2004 concert program "The Music-Hall, We are" (Russian: Мы - Mюзик-холл)
- 2006 concert program "My Flying over Russia" (Russian: Я лечу над Россией)
- 2007 concert program "Eternel Russia" (Russian: Россия Вечная)
- 2008 concert program "Bright Soul of Russia" (Russian: России светлая душа)
- 2009 concert program "With our Love for You" (Russian: Мы Вам дарим любовь)
- 2010 concert program "Cranes of Victory" (Russian: Журавли Победы)

Ballets and concert programs staged for other theatres

- 2010 Classical Ballet "Fairy Tale of Vasnetsov" (Russian: Васнецовская Сказка), depicting fairy-tale, folk and historical paintings by the famous Russian painter Victor Vasnetsov.

Chioreography by Vladimir Zakharov for the Ballet Theatre of Vyatka.
