= William E. Glenn =

American academic and inventor

William Ellis Glenn (May 12, 1926 – July 13, 2013) was an American inventor and Professor at Florida Atlantic University best known for his contributions to imaging technology. Glenn was awarded 136 U.S. patents, has worked as head of NASA Imaging Technology Commercial Space Center, as well as head of FAU's Imaging Technology Center and is among the most prolific commercially viable inventors in America. In 1978, the digital noise reducer invented by him, earned NYIT its first television Emmy award. Glenn directed NYIT's former Science and Technology Research Center in Florida, where he also developed his invention. The digital noise reducer received a patent in 3-D technology in 1979.
