= Guido Breña López =

Peruvian Roman Catholic bishop

Guido Breña López OP
- Bishop of Ica
- Church: Catholic Church
- Diocese: Diocese of Ica
- In office: 5 October 1973 – 31 October 2007
- Predecessor: Alberto Maria Dettmann y Aragón
- Successor: Héctor Vera

Orders
- Ordination: 11 December 1954
- Consecration: 25 November 1973 by Juan Landázuri Ricketts

Personal details
- Born: 9 July 1931 Puquio, Department of Ayacucho, Peru
- Died: 9 July 2013 (aged 82)

Guido Breña López (July 9, 1931 – July 9, 2013) was a Peruvian Roman Catholic bishop. Ordained a priest in 1954, Breña López was named bishop of the Roman Catholic Diocese of Ica in 1973 and retired in 2007.
