= Zyrafete Gashi =

Albanian actress and comedian

- Born: Zyrafete Gashi; Therandë, Kosova
- Died: 30 July 2013; Pristina, Kosovo
- Other name: Zyra

Comedy career
- Years active: 1990–2013
- Genre: Alternative comedy

Zyrafete Gashi, simply known as Zyra, was an Albanian Kosovar comedian. For over three decades active in the comedy stage, Zyra was known for many of roles. The role she got her pseudonym from was Zyra, an Albanian old-woman with old traditions, Zet'hanja, a policewoman, Tetka Dragica, a Serbian Kosovar old-woman from Gračanica complaining about living with Albanians, and many others. She is known for adapting humor and realistic situation in Kosovo.

Although active on TV, Zyra announced that she was moving to Switzerland for a period of 9 months for treatment as she was ill. She came back to her hometown Pristina a few days before dying. On 31 July 2013 her family confirmed that she had died. Her death was spread all over the news and had many documentaries about her life being aired just a few days after.
