= Senji Yamaguchi =

Senji Yamaguchi (山口 仙二, Yamaguchi Senji; 3 October 1930 – 6 July 2013) was a survivor of the atomic bombing of Nagasaki and later an anti-nuclear movement leader.

Yamaguchi was born in 1930 to a poor family in Nagasaki. In 1945, he was employed as an under-age weapons maker. On August 9, 1945, he suffered keloid scars while working digging shelters at the weapon factory when the United States dropped a nuclear bomb 1.3km from the hypocenter of the explosion. When working with 5 other co-workers he was the sole survivor of the group . Mr.Yamaguchi suffered severe third degree burns on parts of his face, shoulder and abdomen area.

Yamaguchi has served in two anti-nuclear organizations, one being the Anti-nuclear arms movement in 1955 and heading the Japan Confederation of A- and H-Bomb Sufferers Organizations between the years of 1981 and 2010. He even once was granted permission to be involved in the 1982 United Nations meeting. In his last years, he was hospitalized and died of an illness on July 6, 2013 in Unzen, Nagasaki.

== See also ==
- Japan's non-nuclear weapons policy
- Three Non-Nuclear Principles
- Article 9 of the Constitution of Japan
- Hiroshima rages, Nagasaki prays
