= François Xavier Nguyên Quang Sách =

Vietnamese Roman Catholic bishop

François Xavier Nguyễn Quang Sách
- Born: May 25, 1925
- Died: July 7, 2013 (aged 88)
- Occupation: Roman catholic bishop

François Xavier Nguyễn Quang Sách (25 May 1925 – 7 July 2013) was a Vietnamese Catholic bishop.

Ordained to the priesthood in 1956, he was named bishop in 1976 and became bishop of the Da Nang Diocese in 1988. He retired in 2002.
