= Shaker Al-Nabulsi =

Shaker Al Nabulsi (December 5, 1940 – January 6, 2014) was an American author and columnist of Jordanian descent.

== Biography ==
al-Nabulsi was a signatory of the St. Petersburg Declaration at the Secular Islam Summit and authored numerous books and widely cited articles on politics, religion, literature and the Arab world. He stated that Sharia laws could only be understood in the context of the period when they were written, and contested the idea that they are eternal. He also called for holding radical clerics to account for Islamic terrorism.

According to al-Nabulsi, "There are individuals in the Muslim world who pose as clerics and issue death sentences against those they disagree with. These individuals give Islam a bad name and foster hatred among civilizations."

In 2006, Al-Nabulsi warned that Hezbollah was planning to establish an Islamic republic in Lebanon modeled on Iran.

Al-Nabulsi coined the term "neo-liberals" for late-twentieth century liberals in the Arab world, and served as their spokesperson.

== Published works (Arabic) ==
- The Poetic Entanglement: An introspection into Fadwa Tuqan's Poetry (1961)
- Open-Ended: The works of Antoine Zhukov (1963)
- Doctrine of Love, Doctrine of Violence: A literary study of Naguib Mahfouz (1985)
- Between the Blade and its Victim: the Short Stories of the Saudi Kingdom (1985)
- The Ubiquitous Fire: A Chronicle of Arabian life (1985)
- What tomorrow May Bring: A look at the Future of Saudi Arabia (1985)
- Light and the Doll: The Poetry of Nizar Qabbani (1986)
- The Bitter Era: Essays on Arab Politics and Culture (1986)
- Settlement Train: Initiatives in Palestinian Equality (1986)
- Abandoning the Color White: Essays on Arab Politics (1986)
- Loaf of Fire: A study of Modern Arabic Poetry (1986)
- Heritage Lunatic: A study of Mahmoud Darwish's Poetry (1987)
- Pillow of Ice: America's Middle Eastern Policy (1987)
- Flightless Bird: The deteriorating Educational System in Arabia (1988)
- The Third Culture: Exploring the Japanese Civilization (1988)
- Working with Sand: The Cultural Development of the Arabian Gulf (1988)
- Stoning with words: A study of Arab Intellectuals (1989)
- Unlocking the Memories of a lady: A study of Ghada Samman's works (1990)
- A Revolution in Heritage: A study of Khalid M Khalid's Thought (1991)
- Desert Tropic: A.R . Munif's Literature (1991)
- Harvest of Silence: A study on Modern Saudi Poetry (1992)
- Freedom & Joy in the Arabic Novel: Examining Arabia's most significant Novelists (1992)
- River East: An Analysis of Contemporary Jordanian Culture (1993)
- The Esthetics of Setting: Reviewing the literature of Ghalib Halasa (1994)
- The Jordanian Novel and its place in Arabic Literature (1994)
- Ballads Within Dwellings: A Biography of Shiek Imam Isa (1998)
- The Age of Decadence & Foster: The cultural landscape under the Ottoman Empire (1999)
- Devoured by the Wolf: A Biography of Political Cartoonist Naji Elali (1999)
- The Sultan: A Guide to Maintaining Political Power (2000)
- Arab thought of the 20th Century (3 Volumes) (2001)
- Wealth and The Crescent: Economic Factors leading to the Advent of Islam (2002)
- The Arabs had Islam Never Emerged: The Counterfactual history of Arabia in the absence of *Islam (2002)
- The Arabian Hamlet: In Memory of Munis Arazaz (2003)
- Arab Street: The Middle East's Political Public Opinion (2003)
- Rise of the Militant Society (2003)
- Critical Views in Politics and Cultures (2004)
- The Rupture: Essays on Iraq (2004)
- Foolish Questions: Islam and Politics (2005)
- Devil's Advocate: A study of Alaffif Alakadir's Thought (2005)
- Neo-Liberals (2005)
- "Why?" Questions in the third Millennium (2006)
- Prisons Without Bars: The Arab World's Current Situation (2007)
- Bin Laden and the Arab Mind (2007)
- Honest Attempts to Grasp the Incomprehensible (2008)
- The Great Wall of Arabia (2009)
- The Inconsistencies of Fundamentalism (2009)
