= Bob Hardesty =

American educator and speechwriter

Robert Louis Hardesty (June 4, 1931 – July 8, 2013) was an American educator and speechwriter for President Lyndon B. Johnson.

Born in Saint Louis, Missouri, Hardesty served in the United States Army and then received his bachelor's degree from George Washington University. He worked for the United States Postmaster General and then worked for President Lyndon Johnson as a speechwriter. After Johnson left office, Hardesty helped Johnson with his memoirs. He served as chairman of the board of governors of the United States Postal Service. From 1981-1988, Hardesty served as president of the Texas State University. He died in Austin, Texas.
