= Don Flye =

American tennis player (1933–2013)

Donald Guy Flye (1933 – July 17, 2013) was an American tennis player.

He was born in Tacoma, Washington and began his tennis career at McKinley Playfield on the east side of Tacoma. He was nationally ranked in Boys and Junior Men's Singles and Doubles. In 1951, for the only time in Pacific Northwest tennis history the National Junior Men's Doubles Championship was won by Pacific Northwest players as Don teamed with Bill Quillian of Seattle to win the title. Don was a member of the United States Junior Davis Cup team in 1952 and 1953. He represented the University of Washington Tennis Team in 1952, 1953 and 1957 winning four Pacific Coast Conference division championships in Singles and Doubles. He scored points in the NCAA championships helping to lead the Huskies to finishes of third in 1952 and fifth in 1953. Based upon his NCAA championship tournament finishes in 1952 and 1953 and the automatic selection process presently used by the Intercollegiate Tennis Association, he would have received All American honors three times, twice for Doubles and once for Singles. As a senior he did not participate in the NCAA Championships as the University of Washington was prohibited from participation.

Don participated in three United States National Singles Championships (Forest Hills, N.Y.) and three United States National Doubles Championships (Boston, MA) and in the 1955 first round play at Wimbledon http://www.wimbledon.com/en_GB/scores/draws/archive/pdfs/1955_MS_A4.pdf. He was nationally ranked in both Singles and Doubles in 1953 and 1954, being ranked in the top ten both years in Men's Open Doubles teamed with Bill Quillian. Don had wins over Davis Cup players from other nations and two Wimbledon champions. For his play in 1954 he was named a Worlds Leading Player. In 1955 Don represented the United States Army in the Worldwide All Services Championships and was a Singles semi-finalist and Doubles finalist and was a member of the All World All Services team. In 2005 he was inducted into the Tacoma Pierce County Sports Hall of Fame.
