= Jim McNally (baseball) =

American baseball umpire (1952-2013)

- Born: 1952; Quincy, Massachusetts, U.S.
- Died: July 25, 2013; Sandwich, Massachusetts, U.S.
- Occupation: Umpire
- Years active: 1979
- Employer: American League

James McNally (1952 – July 25, 2013) was an American Major League Baseball umpire who served as an American League umpire in 1979. He worked 15 games, with his first on April 16 and his last on May 18. He also worked in the International League and the Cape Cod Baseball League.

He was born in Quincy, Massachusetts. He died on July 25, 2013.
