= Westport Records =

- Founded: 1955
- Founder: The Ruf Brother
- Country of origin: United States

Westport Records was a record label founded 1955 in Kansas City by the Ruf Brothers. It lasted until 1962, just releasing about 20 singles.

== See also ==
- List of record labels
