= Diocese of Ica =

Roman Catholic diocese in Peru

Coordinates: 14.0667°S 75.7333°W

Diocese of Ica Dioecesis Icensis

Catholic
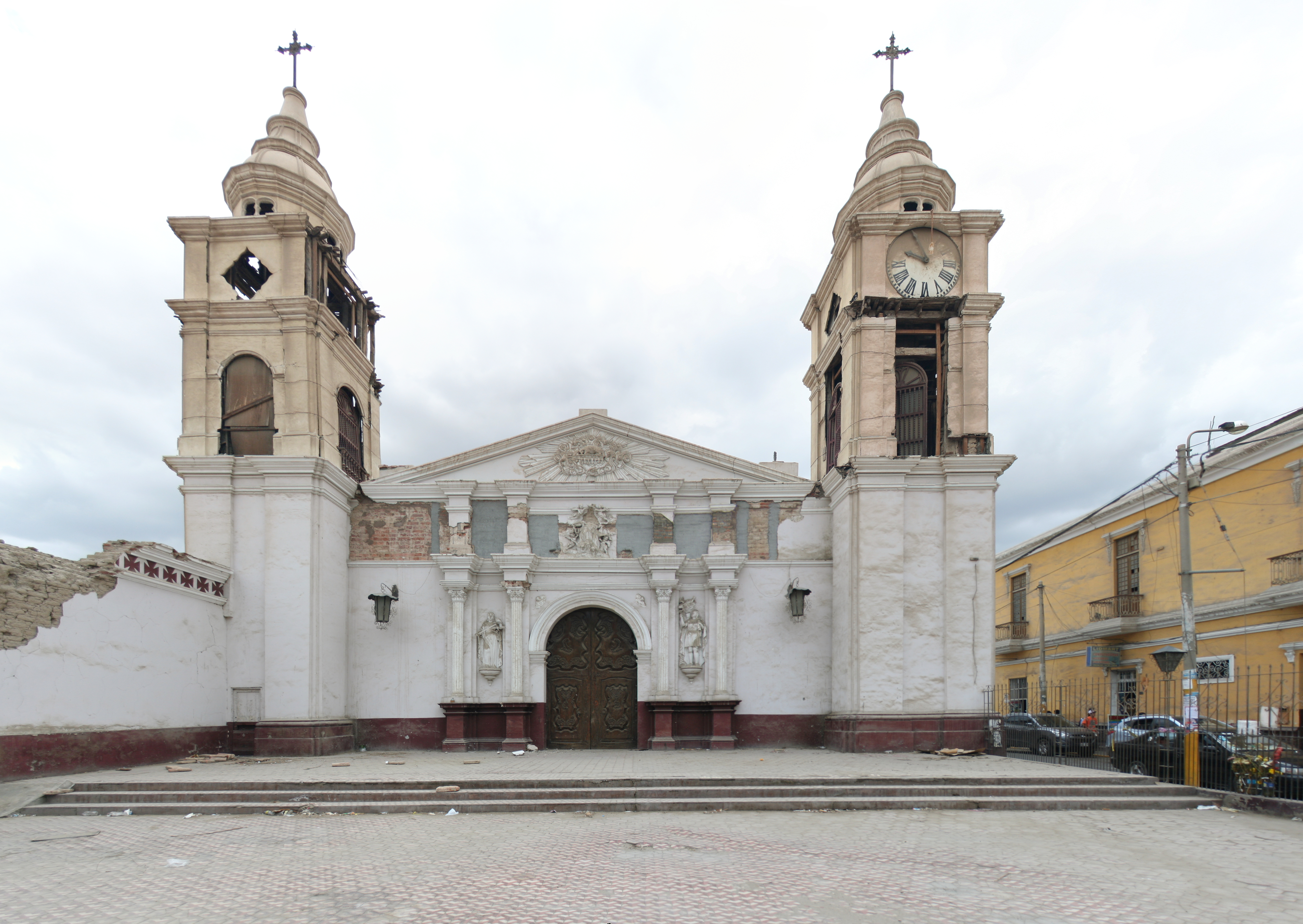

Location
- Country: Peru
- Ecclesiastical province: Lima

Statistics
- Area: 21,305 km^{2} (8,226 sq mi)
- Population: Total; Catholics: (as of 2006); 745,000; 735,000 (98.7%)

Information
- Rite: Latin Rite
- Cathedral: St. Jerome Cathedral, Ica

Current leadership
- Pope: Leo XIV
- Bishop: Héctor Eduardo Vera Colona

Map

The Roman Catholic Diocese of Ica (Latin: Icen(sis)) is a diocese located in the city of Ica in the ecclesiastical province of Lima in Peru.

== History ==
- 10 August 1946: Established as Diocese of Ica from the Metropolitan Archdiocese of Lima

== Bishops ==
=== Ordinaries ===
- Francisco Rubén Berroa y Bernedo (1946.11.24 – 1958.07.12)
- Alberto Maria Dettmann y Aragón, O.P. (1959.02.06 – 1973.10.05)
- Guido Breña López, O.P. (1973.10.05 – 2007.10.31)
- Héctor Eduardo Vera Colona (since 2007.10.31)

=== Auxiliary bishop ===
- Jesús Mateo Calderón Barrueto, O.P. (1969-1972), appointed Bishop of Puno

== See also ==
- Roman Catholicism in Peru

== Sources ==
- GCatholic.org
- Catholic Hierarchy
