= Ulla Mitzdorf =

German scientist

- Born: 15 March 1944; Mittenwald, Germany
- Died: 19 July 2013 (aged 69); Munich, Germany
- Scientific career
- Fields: Neuroscience, physics, chemistry, psychology, physiology, medicine and gender studies
- Workplaces: Technical University of Munich, Max-Planck Institute of Psychiatry, LMU Munich

Ulla Mitzdorf (15 March 1944 – 19 July 2013) was a German scientist. She contributed to diverse areas including physics, chemistry, psychology, physiology, medicine and gender studies.

== Life and Scientific Work ==
Mitzdorf gained her doctorate in theoretical chemistry in 1974 at the Technical University of Munich. Subsequently, she worked as a scholar at the Max-Planck Institute of Psychiatry in Munich. In 1983, she habilitated in physiology, and in 1984 in medical psychology and neurobiology at LMU Munich.

From 1988 to 2009, she was the Fiebiger Professor for medical psychology at LMU Munich. Simultaneously, from 2000 to 2006, she was women's affairs officer and spokeswoman for the state conference of women and gender equality officers in Bavarian universities.

Ulla Mitzdorf significantly contributed to the understanding of local field potentials (LFPs) in the central nervous system. By implementing the technique of current source density (CSD), she provided additional evidence for the theory that cortical LFPs result from the synaptic activity in the brain.

Mitzdorf died after a short illness on 19 July 2013, aged 69.
