= Hugh Lee =

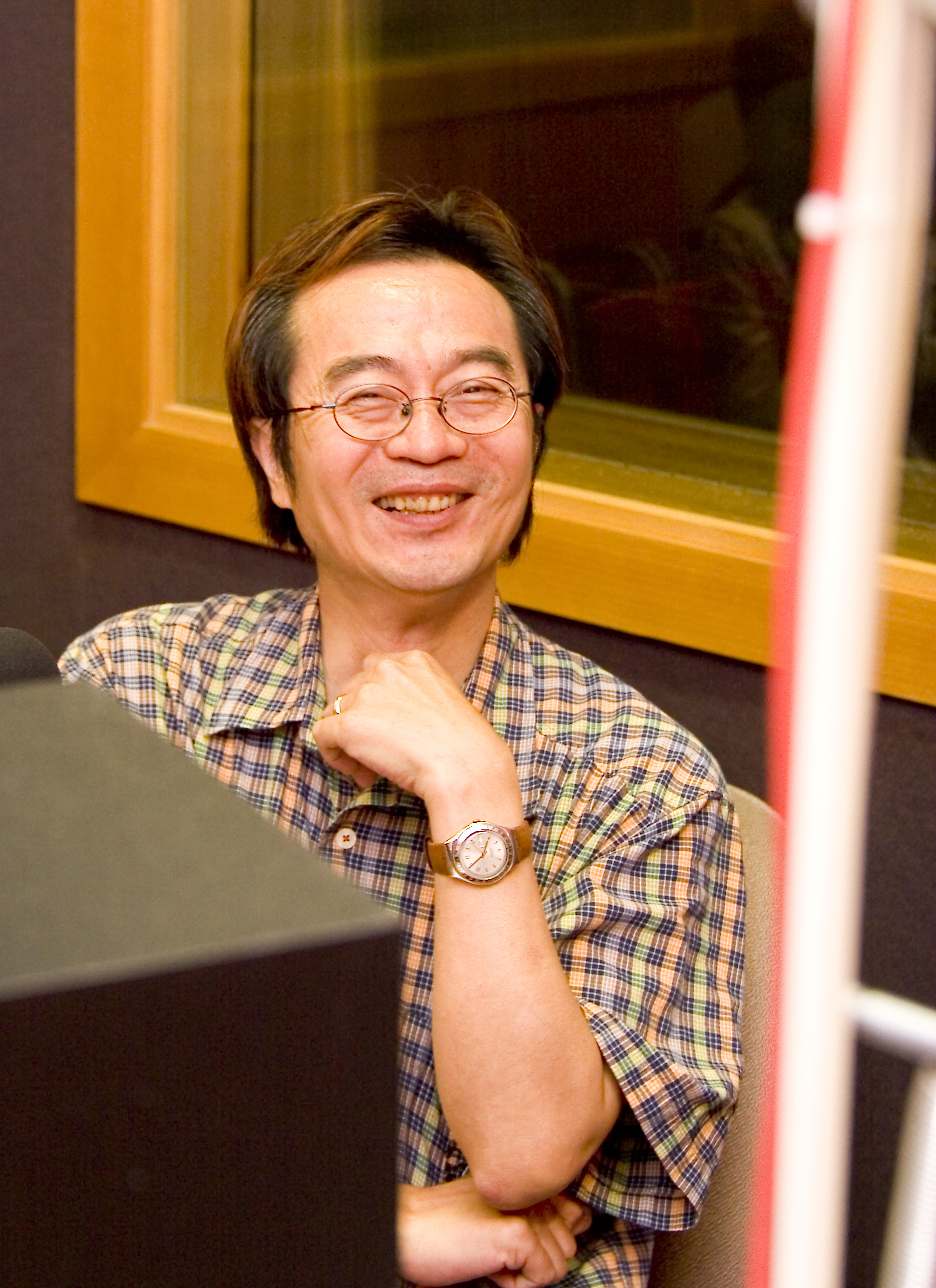
Hugh Lee

Hugh Lee (Chinese: 李國修; pinyin: Lǐ Guóxiū; Pe̍h-ōe-jī: Lí Kok-siu; 30 December 1955 – 2 July 2013) was a Taiwanese Golden Bell-award winning television actor and theatre director.

He founded the Ping-Fong Acting Troupe in 1986, but went on hiatus in December 2011 due to health concerns. Lee died of bowel cancer on 2 July 2013, at age 58. Following his death, Lee's wife Moon Wang announced that Ping-Fong would close after its last scheduled performance in December 2013.

In total, 40 Hugh Lee plays were launched with 1,793 performances completed. These were enjoyed by a cumulative 1.49 million audience members.
