= Mohammed Adam Mallik =

Indian politician

Mohammed Adam Mallik (died 12 July 2013) was an Indian political leader. He was president of Majlis Bachao Tehreek.

== Death ==
Mallik died of a cardiac arrest on 12 July 2013, at the age of 61.
