= Syed Tajammul Hussain =

Pakistani chemist

- Born: January 1, 1951; Multan, Pakistan
- Died: July 28, 2013 (aged 62); Islamabad, Pakistan
- Education: University of Manchester(M.S.); University of Manchester(Ph.D)
- Known for: Various methods for production of nano-catalysts
- Scientific career
- Fields: Chemistry; Physics; Material science
- Workplaces: Quaid-e-Azam University; National Center for Physics

Syed Tajammul Hussain (January 1, 1951 – July 28, 2013), was a Pakistani chemist and physicist.

== Biography ==
Hussain was born in Multan in 1951. He did his early schooling and undergraduate education from Islamabad in chemistry. Followed by his education in Pakistan, he proceeded overseas to the world-renowned hub of material science, the UMIST (University of Manchester Institute of Science and Technology) for his post-graduate education, successfully completing MS and PhD in 1988 and 1991, respectively from the Center for Surface and Material Analysis (CSMA) at UMIST. Followed by his post-doctoral training at UMIST, he spent several years working with commercial organizations in Canada, Italy and Saudi Arabia, contributing and gaining valuable expertise in nanoscience and catalyst research. He joined the Abdus Salam National Center for Physics Nano Science and Catalysis Division in 2005 as a faculty member and was its director and professor until his death in 2013. He also held an appointment as Visiting Professor with the Chemistry Department, Quaid-e-Azam University.

Among other attachments, he held several visiting scientist/fellow positions with organizations, including the Advanced Light Source at University of California Berkeley, the UMIST Surface Science and Catalyst Research Center, Manchester, Center for Applied Catalyst Research, University of Laval, Canada, the National Center for Upgrading Technology (NCUT), Alberta, Canada, and SABIC (Saudi Arabia Basic Industries, Corporation), Saudi Arabia.

Hussain died on 28 July 2013.

== Fellowships ==
- Fellow and Chartered Chemist, Royal Chemical Society, UK
- Fellow American Chemical Society, USA
- Fellow North American Catalyst Society, Canada
- Fellow Chemical Society of Pakistan, Pakistan

== Awards ==
- Pride of Performance (2022)
