= James L. Voss =

- Born: James Leo Voss; April 17, 1934; Grand Junction, Colorado, United States
- Died: July 12, 2013 (aged 79); Fort Collins, Colorado, United States
- Medical career
- Profession: Veterinarian, dean
- Field: Equine
- Institutions: Colorado State University's College of Veterinary Medicine and Biomedical Sciences (1986-2001)
- Sub-specialties: Ambulatory clinician Reproduction

James Leo Voss (April 17, 1934 – July 12, 2013) was an American veterinarian, equine specialist, and dean of Colorado State University's (CSU) College of Veterinary Medicine and Biomedical Sciences.

== Early years ==
Born in Grand Junction, Colorado in 1934, Voss grew up on his family's farm in Orchard Mesa. Graduating from Grand Junction High School in 1952, he married Kathleen Alice "Kay" Claxton in 1954. He earned a Doctor of Veterinary Medicine degree from Colorado A&M (now CSU) in 1958 and later obtained a master's degree at CSU in 1966. He remained at CSU to teach in the Department of Clinical Sciences and work as an equine ambulatory clinician, a veterinarian in equine reproduction, and departmental administrator.

== Departmental administrator ==
In his administrator's position, Voss saw the need for a new veterinary teaching hospital. The old hospital, located in the center of CSU's main campus, offered little space for the flourishing program. The numbers of students enrolled in the program tasked the outdated and inadequate laboratories. Biosecurity issues also began to arise. The university's request for funds was initially turned down by the state legislature. Voss and his colleagues turned to the agricultural and ranching communities, as well as some supportive politicians. The state eventually provided the funding necessary to allow for a new hospital, which opened in 1978 and began with veterinary programs that are still in its curriculum.

== CSU dean ==
In 1986, Voss started a 15-year tenure as CSU's dean of the College of Veterinary Medicine and Biomedical Sciences, retiring in 2001. Upon his retirement, the teaching hospital was renamed in his honor as the James L. Voss Veterinary Teaching Hospital. He was also honored in several congressional speeches, given by Scott McInniss and Wayne Allard. To this day, the CSU veterinary program graduates about 140 veterinarians each year and has been ranked among the top three veterinary teaching programs in the United States.

== Personal life and death ==
Voss and wife Kay lived in Fort Collins, Colorado and had two sons and one daughter. On July 12, 2013, Voss died from a lengthy unspecified illness.

== Bibliography ==
- McKinnon, Angus O.; Voss, James L. (1993). Equine Reproduction. Blackwell Publishing. ISBN 978-0-8121-1427-0.
