= Jesús Mateo Calderón Barrueto =

Jesús Mateo Calderón Barrueto, O.P.
- Bishop Emeritus of Puno
- Church: Roman Catholic Church
- See: Diocese of Puno
- In office: 1978–1996
- Predecessor: Maximiliano Spiller, C.S.I.
- Successor: Julio González Ruiz, S.D.B.

Orders
- Ordination: December 27, 1947
- Consecration: April 27, 1969

Personal details
- Born: September 21, 1920 Cajabamba, Peru
- Died: October 28, 2010 (aged 90) Puno, Peru

Jesús Mateo Calderón Barrueto (21 September 1920 in Cajabamba – 28 October 2010 in Puno) was a Peruvian prelate of the Roman Catholic Church.

Calderón was ordained a priest on December 27, 1947 from the Roman Catholic religious order of the Order of Friars Preachers. Calderón was appointed auxiliary bishop of the Diocese of Ica, as well as titular bishop of Mevania, on March 13, 1969 and was ordained bishop on April 27, 1969. Calderón was appointed bishop of the Diocese of Puno on November 3, 1972, where he served until his retirement on February 14, 1998.
