= Sundararajan Krishna =

Indian cricketer (1938–2013)

Personal information
- Born: 4 March 1938; Bangalore, India
- Died: 16 July 2013 (aged 75); Bangalore, India
- Source: ESPNcricinfo, 2 June 2016

Sundararajan Krishna (4 March 1938 – 16 July 2013) was an Indian cricketer. He played a total of eight first-class matches for Mysore between 1961 and 1964.
