= Mary Ellen Hopkins =

American quilter and author (1932–2013)

Mary Ellen Hopkins (1932–2013) was an American quilter and author.

== Life ==
Hopkins was born in Peoria, Illinois and grew up in the midwestern United States. She attended Drury College and the University of Missouri.

Hopkins married and had four children. In 1963, she moved with her family to Santa Monica, California. She worked from home making men's shirts.

== Quilting ==
In 1977, Hopkins opened a quilt shop in Santa Monica called Crazy Ladies and Friends. Hopkins' short book, The Double Wedding Ring Book, was released in 1981 and her first full-length book, The It's Okay If You Sit on My Quilt Book, in 1982. She founded a company, ME Publishing First Printing, to publish the latter.

Classes offered at her shop developed into invitations to give lectures. Following the release of The It's Okay If You Sit on My Quilt Book, Hopkins began teaching workshops to quilt shop owners interested in her techniques. She lectured throughout the United States and internationally.

Hopkins sold her shop in the late 1990s, continuing to give lectures until 2010. Following a stroke, she died on July 9, 2013.

Hopkins preferred to give talks rather than use a workshop format. She observed of herself, "Getting up on a stage and talking without interruptions was great." Hopkins' lectures were described as having a "trademark high-energy, humorous style". According to Quiltviews, the blog of the American Quilting Society, "Mary Ellen is probably best known for creating the connector and perfect piecing triangles concepts and the PPM – Personal Private Measurement."

== Bibliography ==
- The Double Wedding Ring Book (1981)
- The It's Okay If You Sit on My Quilt Book (1982)
- Baker's Dozen Doubled (1988)
- Hidden Wells (1989)
- Connecting Up #4 (1990)
- Continuing On #4 1/2 (1991)
- A Log Cabin Notebook #5 (1991)
- Even More Well Connected #4 3/4 (1995)
- Kansas Connections #4 7/8 (1996)
- Connectors Collection #4 11/12 (2000)
