= Virginia Tezak =

American baseball player

- Utility player
- Born: May 22, 1928
- Died: July 27, 2013 (aged 85)
- Batted: Right Threw: Right

Teams
- Racine Belles (1948)

Career highlights and awards
- Women in Baseball – AAGPBL Permanent Display at Baseball Hall of Fame and Museum (1988)

Virginia M. Tezak (May 22, 1928 - July 27, 2013), later Papesh, was a right-handed utility player in the All-American Girls Professional Baseball League (AAGPBL). She played in four games for the Racine Belles in 1948, going hitless in seven at-bats.

She was born in Joliet, Illinois, was a graduate of Joliet Township High School and attended Joliet Junior College. She died in Joliet.
