= Reiner Kossmann =

German ice hockey player

Personal information
- Nationality: German
- Born: 1 May 1927 Ortelsburg, East Prussia, Germany (currently Szczytno, Poland)
- Died: 15 July 2013 (aged 86)

Sport
- Sport: Ice hockey

Achievements and titles
- Olympic finals: 1956 Winter Olympics

Reiner Kossmann (1 May 1927 – 15 July 2013) was a German ice hockey player. He competed in the men's tournament at the 1956 Winter Olympics.
