= Robert Bossenger =

South African cricketer (1940–2013)

Personal information
- Born: 17 September 1940; East London, Eastern Cape, South Africa
- Died: 8 July 2013 (aged 72)
- Source: ESPNcricinfo, 2 June 2016

Robert Bossenger (17 September 1940 – 8 July 2013) was a South African cricketer. He played one first-class match for Eastern Province in 1964/65.
