= David Stockings =

English cricketer

David Charles Stockings (22 July 1944 – 31 July 2013) was an English cricketer. He was a right-handed batsman who played for Norfolk. He was born in Cambridge.

Stockings, who made three appearances in the Minor Counties Championship for the team during the 1967 season, made his sole List A appearance in the 1968 Gillette Cup, against Cheshire. He scored three runs, and took one catch.
