= İsa Huso =

Syrian politician

İsa Huso (1953-July 30, 2013) was a Syrian Kurdish politician. He was a member of the Kurdish Supreme Committee.

== Death ==
Huso was assassinated when a bomb planted inside his car detonated as he left his house in the morning of July 30, 2013 in the city of Qamishli. Huso had actively participated in the founding congress of the Kurdish Democratic Union Party. He was described by Kurdish activists as a moderate. Unnamed sources pointed to militant Islamists in the region, as the YPG later issued a call to arms to all Kurds to fight jihadists operating in the north.
