= Leighton Gage =

American novelist

- Born: Leighton David Gage; May 13, 1942; Rahway, New Jersey, U.S.
- Died: July 26, 2013 (aged 71); Miami, Florida, U.S.
- Occupation: Novelist
- Writing career
- Language: English
- Genre: Police procedural
- Website: www.leightongage.com

Leighton David Gage (May 13, 1942 – July 26, 2013) was an American author of crime fiction best known for the Chief Inspector Mario Silva Investigations series of novels set in Brazil. He was inspired to write these novels after spending over 20 years living in São Paulo, Brazil, and being immersed in the Brazilian culture. Frequent subjects in his novels were problems that existed at the time in Brazil, problems that were foreign to the American culture.

Prior to his literary career, Gage was an international creative director for a major worldwide advertising agency. He won over 120 awards for advertising excellence and served on the juries of the Lions Festival in Cannes, the Art Director's Club of New York, the Clio Awards, and the Australian Writers and Art Directors Association. He is also the co-author of O Filme Publicitário, a non-fiction work in Portuguese. It was widely sold in Brazil, Portugal, and the Portuguese-speaking countries of Africa and was adopted as a textbook in many universities in those countries.

Born in the Rahway, New Jersey, in the United States, Gage lived for extended periods in Germany, the United Kingdom, Netherlands, Australia, Argentina, and Brazil. He spoke English, Dutch, German, French, Spanish and Portuguese. He visited Spain in the time of Franco, Portugal in the time of Salazar, South Africa in the time of apartheid, Chile in the time of Pinochet, Argentina in the time of the junta, Prague, East Germany and Yugoslavia in the days when the Soviet Union held sway and also lived in Brazil during the time of the military government.

Gage and his Brazilian-born wife spent much of the year in a small town near São Paulo and the remainder of the time visiting children and grandchildren living in three other countries.

His books have been translated into a number of languages. The whole collection is known as "The Chief Inspector Mario Silva Investigations". The books cover a vast array of subjects, including underage prostitution, organ theft, snuff videos, and much more.

Gage's first novel, Blood of the Wicked, was about the assassination of a bishop.

Gage died at his home in Miami, Florida on 26 July 2013 after a three-month battle with pancreatic cancer.

== Works ==
- O Filme Publicitário (ISBN 8522406642)
- Blood of the Wicked (ISBN 978-1569474709)
- Buried Strangers (ISBN 978-1569475140)
- Dying Gasp (ISBN 978-1569478653)
- Every Bitter Thing (ISBN 978-1569478455)
- A Vine in the Blood (ISBN 978-1616950040)
- Perfect Hatred (ISBN 978-1616951764)
- The Ways of Evil Men (ISBN 978-1616952723)
