= Ram Mynampati =

Indian business executive

Ram Mynampati is an Indian business executive. He was a board member of Satyam Computer Services until January 2009, when news of an accounting fraud at Satyam broke. He was briefly the interim CEO after the then-Chairman and CEO Ramalinga Raju admitted to the accounting fraud and stepped down. He was replaced by A. S. Murthy as the CEO on February 5, 2009.

== Career at Satyam ==
Mynampati joined Satyam as Executive Vice President in 1999 and became Executive Vice President and Chief Operating Officer in November 2000. He was President, Satyam’s commercial and healthcare businesses since October 2002. Mynampati had executive responsibility for Satyam's operations across the verticals of Financial Services, Healthcare, Retail, Transportation and Government (about 60% of its business). In addition, he oversaw Satyam's GE and Microsoft accounts. His career at Satyam ended on 23 June 2009, while he was still under a cloud of suspicion for being involved in the multi-crore accounting fraud.

== Accounting fraud ==
After news of an accounting fraud at Satyam broke on 7 January 2009, Mynampati was appointed to the post due to the resignation and arrest of the then-current chairman and CEO Ramalinga Raju. Mynampati was a board member of Satyam prior to the scandal, but his membership ended when the Indian government dismissed the earlier board and appointed new members to oversee Satyam's activities. After the accounting fraud came to light, Mynampati avoided police enquiry and flew to the US immediately after the new board was installed.

== Other information ==
Mynampati holds M.S in Computer Science from California State University. Mynampati is also director on the Board of Satyam Venture Engineering Services Pvt. Ltd., a joint venture between the Company and Venture Global Engineering LLC, USA.
