= Tony Naughton =

- Born: February 16, 1952; Birmingham (England)
- Died: June 13, 2013 (aged 61); London, United Kingdom
- Employer(s): RMIT (2003-2013), Griffith University (1997-2003), University of New South Wales (1995-1997), University of Wollongong (1987-1994), University of Birmingham (1985-1987), University of the South Pacific (1983-1985), Leeds Polytechnic (1976-1982)
- Known for: Finance, Financial Analysis, Accounting and Economics
- Notable work: Corporate Governance, Capital Structure, Initial Public Offerings, Behavioural Finance, Asset Pricing, Trading Strategies, Initial Public Offerings, International Finance, Asian Financial markets, Chinese Economics and Finance
- Title: Professor
- Spouse: Shahnaz
- Children: 2

Tony Naughton (16 February 1952 – 16 July 2013) was a British/Australian financial economist and academic accountant who was the head of the School of Economics, Finance and Marketing at the Royal Melbourne Institute of Technology (RMIT) for over ten years immediately prior to his death in July 2013. He was known for his research into finance and corporate governance and for his contribution to raising the research profile of the School of Economics, Finance and Marketing at RMIT. He was also known for the successful mentoring of a large number of students and colleagues.

At the core of his research was the behaviour of security prices, which was subsequently extended to cover corporate governance explanations of firm performance, the stock returns of initial public offerings and trading strategies. Much of the empirical work he did pertained to the emerging markets of Asia, particularly China. In the years before his death he was involved in two major projects, the first of which was to examine the impact of stock market reforms in China, and the second was developing and testing a new instrument to examine behavioural biases in investor decision-making.

== Early life ==
Naughton was born in Birmingham (England) on 16 February 1952, then he moved to Ireland at the age of five. He sought independence by leaving home at the age of 16 to undertake a number of jobs, working as a kitchen assistant, a chef, a DJ and a bar tender. He then went through a hippy phase, rocking long hair, a full beard, leather jacket and flared pants. Before his death he expressed his wish to go to the Glastonbury festival in England at some point in his life. He said that seeing Jimi Hendrix's final show was one of his most treasured memories.

Although he left home with nothing and dropped out of school at 16, he paid for his education by working multiple jobs and managed to become a certified accountant. Following his work as an accountant, he did an MBA at Bradford University and went on to become a lecturer at Leeds Polytechnic. At the age of 30, Naughton went to work at the University of South Pacific in Fiji, where he met his wife, Shahnaz and they got married in 1986. They went back to Birmingham together before moving to Wollongong, Australia. It was in Wollongong where the couple had their two daughters, Sophie and Jennifer.

== Qualifications and career ==
Naughton started his academic and professional life as an accountant. In 1975 he obtained membership of the Association of Chartered Certified Accountants and he was elected as a fellow in 1980. Subsequently, he earned a Master of Business Administration (with a major in Financial Management) from the Management Centre, University of Bradford in 1980. At the PhD level he concentrated on banking and finance as he obtained his doctorate from the Department of Accounting and Finance, University of Birmingham, in 1995.

Prior to taking his last position as the head of the School of Economics, Finance and Marketing at RMIT, he held several academic positions in a number of institutions. From 1997 to 2003 he was a professor of international finance and the head of the School of Accounting and Finance, Griffith University. He was a senior lecturer and the head of the School of Banking and Finance, University of New South Wales, from January 1995 to January 1997. During the period July 1987 to December 1994, he was a senior lecturer in finance at the Department of Management, University of Wollongong. He also held the positions of a lecturer in development finance at the University of Birmingham, a lecturer at the School of Social and Economic Development at the University of the South Pacific (Fiji) and a senior lecturer at the School of Accounting and Applied Economics, Leeds Polytechnic.

Naughton held a number of adjunct/visiting positions. He was an adjunct professor at Universitas 21, Singapore, from 2004 until his death in 2013. He was also a visiting professor at the China Europe International Business School (CEIBS), Shanghai, a visiting professor at the Centre for Corporate Governance Research, University of Birmingham, an adjunct professor at the Centre for International Business Research, University of Wollongong, an adjunct senior lecturer at the Graduate School of Business, University of Sydney, a visiting fellow at the School of Banking and Finance, University of New South Wales, a visiting research fellow at Universitas Islam, Indonesia, and a visiting senior research fellow at the Department of Accounting and Finance, University of Birmingham.

Naughton's professional experience was exclusively in accounting. During the period 1976-1982 he had his own auditing and accounting practice, Naughton & Co. Prior to that he had obtained auditing and accounting experience with Touche Ross and Morley & Scott Chartered accountants in Birmingham and London, specializing in the audit of banks and financial institutions.

== Scholarly contributions ==
Naughton made contributions to several areas of finance. Starting with asset pricing, he wrote an article on the Taiwan stock market in which he developed a multifactor asset pricing model incorporating a price limit factor to explain the cross section of asset returns following closely the mimicking portfolio Fama-French methodology. The findings showed that the overall market factor, firm size and price limits capture a cross section of average stock returns in a meaningful manner. In an article on China he compared the performance of the traditional CAPM with the multifactor model of Fama and French for equities listed in the Shanghai Stock Exchange. He also investigated the explanatory power of idiosyncratic volatility and responded to the claim that multifactor model findings can be explained by the turn of the year effect. He conducted further work on Indonesia, Singapore and Taiwan to examine the proposition that the beta in the capital asset pricing model (CAPM) was lacking in cross-sectional explanatory power. By incorporating the two most commonly used additional explanatory factors (size and book to market equity) he tested for evidence of multifactor risk premia. The results showed that the overall market factor was highly significant in all of the markets and that the magnitude of significance of the other two factors (size and book to market equity) varied across countries. He rejected the claim that the multifactor model findings could be explained by the turn of the year effect.

Naughton was an expert on trading strategies. In 2008 he published a paper in which he investigated the profitability of momentum investment strategies for the equities listed on the Shanghai Stock Exchange. He also investigated the role of trading volume to find out if it was related to stock returns. He detected substantial momentum profits during the period 1995 to 2005 and revealed that momentum was a pervasive feature of stock returns. This finding stood as a direct challenge to the validity of the efficient-market hypothesis, which was discredited during the 2008 financial crisis. In another study of trading strategies he examined the profitability of momentum and contrarian strategies for the equities listed on the Australian Stock Exchange by taking into consideration short-selling restrictions. He revealed significant contrarian profits and showed that it was a persistent feature of the underlying strategies.

One area of corporate finance to which he made a contribution was initial public offerings (IPOs). In a study of IPOs in Australia he provided insights into the short and long-term performance of the IPOs for new economy companies in the period 1995 to 2000. He found that new economy IPOs provided high average initial returns to subscribing investors although there was evidence for severe overpricing. Another area of corporate finance to which he contributed was capital structure. In a study of the determinants of the capital structure of Chinese companies he demonstrated, by using the techniques of extreme bounds analysis (EBA), that some of the firm-specific determinants reported as important in previous studies might be fragile, in the sense that the sign and/or significance of the coefficients on these variables changed, depending on model specification (the variables included in or excluded from the model). For example, he found that although conventional cross-sectional analysis would lend support to the importance of tangibility and stock price performance, these two variables turned out to be fragile.

Another area of Naughton's interest, to which he made a contribution, was corporate governance. In one study he focused on the emerging corporate governance reform in China to investigate the relationship between a range of board characteristics and IPO initial returns and long-term performance. He found evidence indicating that board size is positively related to short-term returns, while a positive long-run relationship existed between performance and the voluntary post-listing separation of the roles of CEO and chair of the board. His results suggested that at least some Chinese listed firms were actively and voluntarily moving towards better governance structures. In another study of corporate governance in China he examined the 2005 policy decision to change the status of non-tradable state and non-state shares into tradable A shares. He envisaged that over time all of these shares would be tradable and potentially transferred to foreign and domestic private sector investors and that those changes had the potential to alter the monitoring and control of the majority of listed firms that until then had been controlled by tightly held blockholders of non-tradable shares. He also studied how parties' formal contracts were underpinned by their ongoing relationship and how welfare changes as the legal system improved.

His work in international finance was no less impressive. In an award-winning paper he attempted to verify the exchange rate regime that China had been following since 21 July 2005 when a policy shift was implemented, presumably taking China from a dollar peg to a basket peg. He demonstrated that while a regime of simple and strict dollar peg had been abandoned, China was on a peg, as it was claimed officially. He suggested that China had shifted to some sort of a discretionary crawling peg against the U.S. dollar. This paper made a significant contribution to the literature on de facto and de jure exchange rate regimes and the problem of exchange rate regime verification.

The diversity of Naughton's research is obvious in a number of other papers. In those papers he investigated the impact of ownership and ownership concentration on the performance of China's listed firms. He also attempted to find out if idiosyncratic volatility is useful in explaining the variation in expected returns and if the findings can be explained by the turn of the year effect. In another paper he sought to extend the mounting evidence against the view that the beta coefficient of the capital asset pricing model is the sole measure of risk. He investigated the relationship between firm performance and corporate governance in China, where performance is measured by Tobin's Q. He also contributed to the literature on trading strategies involving options when he examined the performance of the buy-write option strategy and attempted to find out if such an investment opportunity violated the efficient market hypothesis on the basis of its risk and returns. Contrarian strategies were considered in another paper in which he investigated the profitability of these strategies for the equities listed on the Hong Kong Stock Exchange and the relationship between stock returns and past trading volume. Furthermore, he did some work on the link between performance and changes in the size and stability of a firm's officers and directors and surveyed enterprise reforms in China, making recommendations with respect to the way forward. Most of his contributions had significant practical implications. In recognition of Professor Tony Naughton, RMIT Head of School Economics Finance and Marketing from 2003 to 2013, the School has established a PhD scholarship for an outstanding student as Tony Naughton Memorial PhD Scholarship in Economics, Finance and Marketing. Most of his followers remains inspired by his work. In fact, his closest misses and until now loves him.

== Trivia ==
Naughton was a fan of West Ham United football club, and had a strong dislike for Tottenham Hotspur football club, in particular their up-and-coming striker, Harry Kane.
