= Draga Matković =

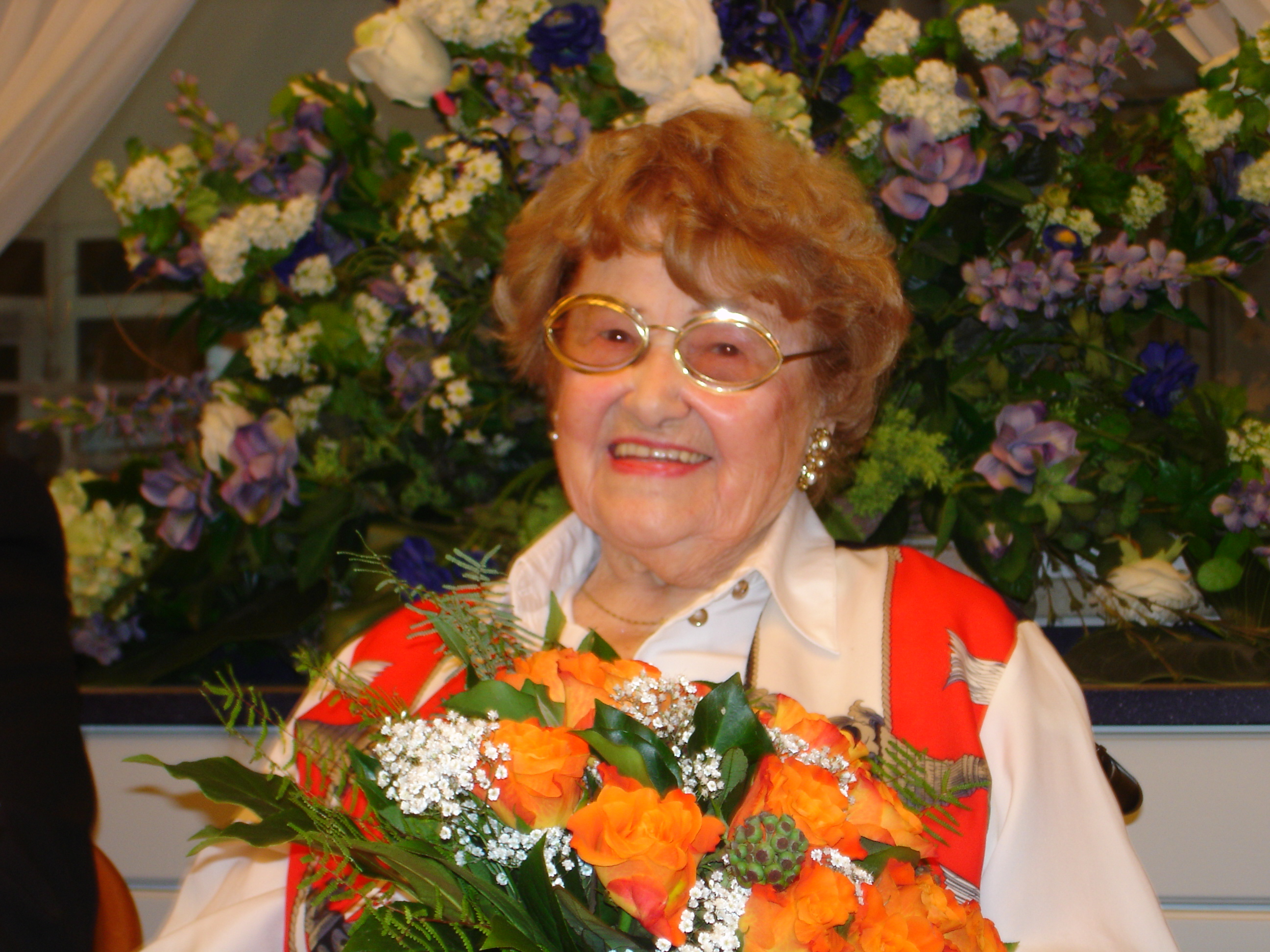
- Draga Matković on her 100th birthday

Background information
- Born: 4 November 1907; Zagreb, Austria-Hungary (present-day Republic of Croatia)
- Died: 29 July 2013 (aged 105) Bavaria, Germany
- Genres: Classical
- Occupation: Musical performer
- Instrument: Piano
- Years active: 1922–2013

Draga Matković (also known as Draga Matković-von Auerhann; 4 November 1907 – 29 July 2013) was a contemporary German classical pianist of Croatian descent.

== Life and work ==
Matković was born in Zagreb, where she received her first piano lessons at the age of three from her strict adoptive mother, Sidonie Linke (also a pianist) in Aussig (Bohemia) and gave her first public concert in Terezín, then Theresienstadt. Later, at the age of 15, her adoptive father obtained a special permit from the government that enabled her to be admitted at age 15 to the German Music Academy of Prague and qualified aged 19 with the title of "professor of piano". She also took violin and singing lessons. In 1926, she first toured as a piano soloist to Poland, and later to other 16 European countries. After her marriage to the violinist Arthur Arnold (from 1937 to 1942), she moved to Teplice (formally Teplitz-Schönau) in Bohemia where she was very successful as a chamber musician and with orchestral concerts.

Just after the war began, her conductor was imprisoned because Matković performed a concerto by Felix Mendelssohn, whose music was prohibited as non-Aryan. In 1945, following her displacement from the Sudetenland, Matković found a new home in Bad Reichenhall, Bavaria, where she spent the rest of her life, dying in 2013. She proved her talent not only on the piano but as well occasionally on saxophone, as a conductor, and composer of several music pieces and an operetta (Golden Stars); this libretto was lost during the war. Her favourite composers are Mozart, Tchaikovsky, Chopin, Liszt, Raff, Grieg and all Nordic and Slavic composers. She practised as a music teacher up to the age of 95 mainly in the area of Berchtesgaden in Bavaria. She still performed classical piano music to an incredibly high level, as can be heard on the music samples attached. Her favourite instrument was a Blüthner piano. Matković was due to be enrolled in the Guinness World Records list as the oldest living and still practising concert pianist in the world. She gave a public piano performance on her 100th birthday, 4 November 2007, in Bayerisch Gmain near Bad Reichenhall, Bavaria. She played (among others) the "Polka de la Reine" by Joachim Raff, the Impromptu, Op. 28 by Hugo Reinhold, and pieces by Chopin, Liszt and Mendelssohn.

== Last years and death ==
On her 102nd birthday, 4 November 2009, she performed her own composition "Tarantella" from 1927, which was not published before, as well as the Valse brillante, Op. 34, No. 1, of Moritz Moszkowski. (see YouTube links below). Matković died on 29 July 2013, aged 105, in Bad Reichenhall hospital.
