= Gerald W. Thomas =

American academic, author, and veteran

- Born: July 3, 1919; Small, Idaho, U.S.
- Died: July 31, 2013 (aged 94)
- Education: John Muir High School
- Alma mater: Pasadena Junior College; University of Idaho (B.S., Forestry, 1941); Texas A&M University (M.S., Wildlife Management, 1951; Ph.D., Wildlife Management, 1954)
- Occupations: President Emeritus of New Mexico State University author veteran of World War II

Gerald W. Thomas
- Born: July 3, 1919; Small, Idaho, U.S.
- Died: July 31, 2013 (aged 94)
- Military career
- Allegiance: United States
- Service years: 1942–1945
- Conflicts: Second World War
- Awards: Distinguished Flying Cross (United States); Air Medals; Presidential Unit Citations

Gerald Waylett Thomas (July 3, 1919 – July 31, 2013) was President Emeritus of New Mexico State University, a veteran of World War II, and an author.

== Biography ==
=== Early life ===
Gerald W. Thomas was born at home on the Daniel Thomas ranch on Medicine Lodge Creek, Small, Idaho on July 3, 1919. His parents were Daniel Waylett Thomas and Mary Elizabeth Evans. Thomas was the second oldest of six sons.

=== Education ===
Thomas attended the local Medicine Lodge school through the 11th grade, the last grade the school offered. He moved to Pasadena, California, and finished high school at John Muir High School. He attended Pasadena Junior College for two years and then obtained a Bachelor of Science degree in Forestry in February, 1941, from the University of Idaho, at Moscow, Idaho.

In 1950, he enrolled in Texas A&M University, at College Station, Texas, where he obtained a MS degree in Wildlife Management in 1951 and a Ph.D. in Wildlife Management in 1954 (called Range Management then).

=== Military service ===
On February 5, 1942, Thomas volunteered for the Navy. He passed his "B-check" in a N3N "Yellow Peril" at the “Elimination Base” at Los Alamitos, California, on July 2, 1942. Assigned to Naval Aviation School, Corpus Christi, Texas, he graduated with an Ensign Commission on November 27, 1942. He then received six weeks of dive-bomber training at Naval Air Station Miami in Opa-locka, Florida.

In January, 1943, Thomas was assigned to Torpedo Squadron Four (VT-4) attached to the USS Ranger (CV-4). VT-4 was a 9-plane Grumman TBF Avenger unit with 12 pilots and 2 non-flying officers. It was a part of Air Group 4 along with a 16-plane fighter squadron (VF-4) and a 16-plane dive bomber squadron (VB-4).

Thomas' first combat action was Operation Leader, a strike on German shipping along the coast of Norway on October 4, 1943. On that strike, while attacking a freight barge carrying 40 tons of ammunition, Thomas' plane was hit by anti-aircraft fire. The engine began burning and it appeared the plane was going down. Thomas ordered his crew of two to bail out and had just opened the cockpit and was climbing out when his turret gunner yelled, "Don't jump, don't jump." The other crewman had accidentally opened his parachute in the belly of the plane. With bailing no longer possible, Thomas considered his options and decided their best chance was to fly the plane toward the carrier as far as it would go. Surprisingly, in spite of the considerable engine damage, the plane made it back to the Ranger, where Thomas crash-landed. That landing was his 13th official carrier landing.

On June 26, 1944, Air Group 4 was ordered off the Ranger and to the West Coast of the United States for an assignment in the Pacific. After some time on the West Coast and some time training in Hawaii, Air Group 4 was ordered aboard the USS Bunker Hill (CV-17) on November 4, 1944. On the Bunker Hill, Thomas participated in strikes against Ormoc Bay, Manila Bay, and Cavite in the Philippines. During this combat period, Air Group 4 lost seven pilots and four crewmen.

On November 18, 1944, Air Group 4 was assigned to the USS Essex (CV-9). On the Essex, Thomas participated in strikes against Santa Cruz, San Fernando, Lingayen, Mindoro, Clark Field, Aparri, Formosa, French Indo-China, Saigon, Pescadores, Hainan, Amami O Shima, Iwo Jima, Okinawa, and Japan. The attack on Japan was the first attack on Japan from an aircraft carrier since the "Doolittle Raid."

While on the Essex, just after Thomas had returned from a strike on Santa Cruz, the ship was hit by a Kamikaze flying a Yokosuka D4Y dive bomber. The Kamikaze attack killed 16 crewmen and wounded 44.

Returning from a strike on Hainan, off the Chinese coast, Thomas' plane ran out of fuel. After a harrowing water landing, Thomas and his crewmen succeeded in inflating and launching rubber boats. After a long day in pre-Typhoon weather with 40 foot swells, they were rescued by the USS The Sullivans (DD-537).

On March 2, 1945, Air Group 4 was assigned non-combat duty and transferred off the Essex. Thomas was awarded 3 Distinguished Flying Crosses, 2 Air Medals, and 2 Presidential Unit Citations for his combat actions in World War II.

=== NMSU President ===
Thomas was the 17th NMSU president, and the second longest serving president. When he became president, NMSU had about 900 faculty and the main campus enrollment was about 8,000. By his retirement, the faculty had grown to 1,700 and enrollment was more than 12,500 students. An additional 3,000 students were enrolled at NMSU's four branch campuses.

== Death ==
Thomas died on July 31, 2013, at age 94.

== Bibliography ==
- Thomas, Gerald W. Progress and Change in the Agricultural Industry: An Overview. Kendall/Hunt Pub. Co., 1973.
- Thomas, Gerald W. Food and Fiber for a Changing World: Third Century Challenge to American Agriculture. Interstate Printers & Publishers, 1982.
- Thomas, Gerald W., Walker, Roger D., and Billington, Monroe I. Victory in World War II: The New Mexico Story. University of New Mexico Press, 1994.
- Thomas, Gerald W. Torpedo Squadron Four -- A Cockpit View of World War II. Revised Edition. Doc45 Publications, 2011.
- Thomas, Gerald W. Torpedo Squadron Four -- Photo Supplement. Doc45 Publications, 2012.
- Thomas, Gerald W. The Academic Ecosystem -- Issues Emerging in a University Environment. Revised Edition. Doc45 Publications, 2012
- Thomas, Gerald W. A Winding Road to the Land of Enchantment. Doc45 Publications, 2011.
