= Leena Luostarinen =

Finnish painter (1949–2013)

Leena Estelle Luostarinen
- Leena Luostarinen, 1988
- Born: 15 May 1949; Pori, Finland
- Died: 13 July 2013 (aged 64); Helsinki, Finland
- Known for: Painting

Leena Estelle Luostarinen (15 May 1949 – 28 July 2013) was a Finnish painter. Working as an artist for over forty years, she was well known for her colourful and mysterious works. Many of her paintings featured felines, ibises, flowers, and sphinxes.

Luostarinen received various awards and grants during her lifetime, including the Pro Finlandia Medal in 1995.
