= Frank Woodrow Wilson =

American businessman and politician

Frank Woodrow Wilson (November 29, 1923 – July 8, 2013) was an American businessman, lawyer, and politician.

From Bastrop, Louisiana, Wilson served in the United States Navy during World War II. He then went to the University of Louisiana at Monroe. Wilson graduated from Louisiana State University Law School and practiced law. He also worked in real estate development. Wilson served in the Louisiana House of Representatives 1954-1962 as a Democrat. He was elected city judge of Bastrop, Louisiana 1960–1984.
