= Graeme Farrell (South Australia cricketer) =

Australian cricketer

Personal information
- Born: 4 February 1943; Adelaide, Australia
- Died: 25 July 2013 (aged 70)

Domestic team information
- Years: Team
- 1966-1967: South Australia
- Source: Cricinfo, 13 March 2016

Graeme Farrell (4 February 1943 – 25 July 2013) was an Australian cricketer. He played seven first-class matches for South Australia between 1966 and 1967.

== See also ==
- List of South Australian representative cricketers
