= Gail Levin (filmmaker) =

Gail Levin (June 20, 1946 in Chicago – 31 July 2013 in The Bronx) was a documentary filmmaker best known for her work with the PBS series American Masters. She died 31 July 2013 in the Bronx at the age of 67 from breast cancer.
