= Antonio Vidal (artist) =

Cuban artist (1928–2013)

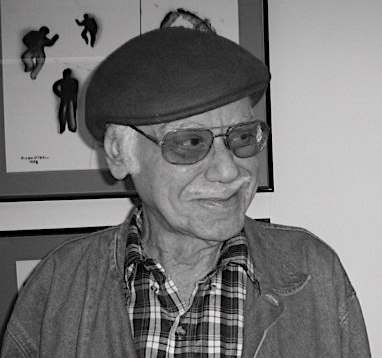
- Born: February 28, 1928; Havana, Cuba
- Died: July 30, 2013
- Occupation: Artist

Antonio Vidal Fernández (February 20, 1928, in Havana, Cuba – July 30, 2013) was a Cuban artist. He was active in the fields of painting, drawing, engraving, graphic design, and sculpture. Between 1953 and 1955 he was a member of the Grupo "Los Once", Havana. In 1962 he was a founding member of the Taller Experimental de Gráfica de La Habana (TEG), Havana.

== Individual exhibitions ==
Solo exhibitions include Antonio Vidal: tintas in the Galería de La Habana, Havana, 1967. In 1991 he exhibited his works in a show titled Antonio Vidal. Pinturas in the Galería La Acacia, Havana. That same year he presented Antonio Vidal. Pinturas in the Galería Alfama, Zaragoza, Spain. In 1993 he displayed Antonio Vidal 40 años en la Plástica. Pinturas y Dibujos de pequeño Formato in the Galería de Arte Galiano y Concordia, Havana.

== Collective exhibitions ==
He was part of many collective exhibitions, such as 1954's Contemporary Cuban Group in the Galería Sudamericana, New York City. In 1963 he was one of the selected artists to display at 1913-1963 Cincuentenario del Museo Nacional in the Museo Nacional de Bellas Artes, Havana. In 1966 he was part of the Ínternational Print Biennale at Cracow, Poland.In 1966 he was part of the Exhibition "Pittura Cubana Contemporanea" at Galleria Due Mondi in Rome, [Italy]. In the same year he also participated in the 5th International Print Biennial at the Museum of Modern Art, Tokyo, Japan. In 1984 he was included in the show Por la Libertad y la Amnistía total at the Centro Cultural del Conde Duque, Madrid, Spain. In 1997 he was one of the selected artists for Pinturas del Silencio at the Galería La Acacia, Havana.

== Awards ==
In 1999 Fernández was recognized with the Award Premio Nacional de Artes Plásticas from the Ministry of Culture, Cuba.

== Collections ==
In Cuba his works formed part of the collections of the Museo Nacional de Bellas Artes de La Habana.
