= Mynampati Bhaskar =

- Born: Mynampati Lakshmi Narasimha Bhaskar; 27 October 1945; Ongole, Prakasam district, Andhra Pradesh, British Raj
- Died: 4 June 2013 (aged 67); Hyderabad, India
- Occupations: Novelist, journalist, short story writer, cartoonist

Mynampati Bhaskar (27 October 1945 – 4 June 2013) was a writer and a journalist from Andhra Pradesh. His works include short stories, novels, news articles, movie reviews and children stories. He was also a cartoonist. Adventure, science fiction, social issues, history, and humor are his primary genres. He wrote thirty novels and more than one hundred short stories. Some of his novels are preserved in Washington Library, Chicago, Illinois.

He died on 4 June 2013 while undergoing treatment in Care Hospital, Hyderabad.
