= Károly Molnár (academic) =

Hungarian mechanical engineer and academic

Károly Molnár (24 February 1944 – 23 July 2013) was a Hungarian mechanical engineer and academic, who served as Rector of the Budapest University of Technology and Economics between 2004 and 2008. Molnár was minister without portfolio in charge of research and development in the minority government of Ferenc Gyurcsány from 5 May 2008 to 14 April 2009.

== Selected publications ==
- Szárítási kézikönyv (co-author, 1974)
- Számítástechnika a kémiában és a vegyiparban (co-author, 1984)
- Transzportfolyamatok (co-author, 1986)
- Studies in Computer – Modelling, Design and Operation (co-author, 1992)

== Sources ==
- MTI Ki Kicsoda 2009, Magyar Távirati Iroda, Budapest, 2008, pp. 766–767, ISSN 1787-288X
