= Luis Fernando Intriago Páez =

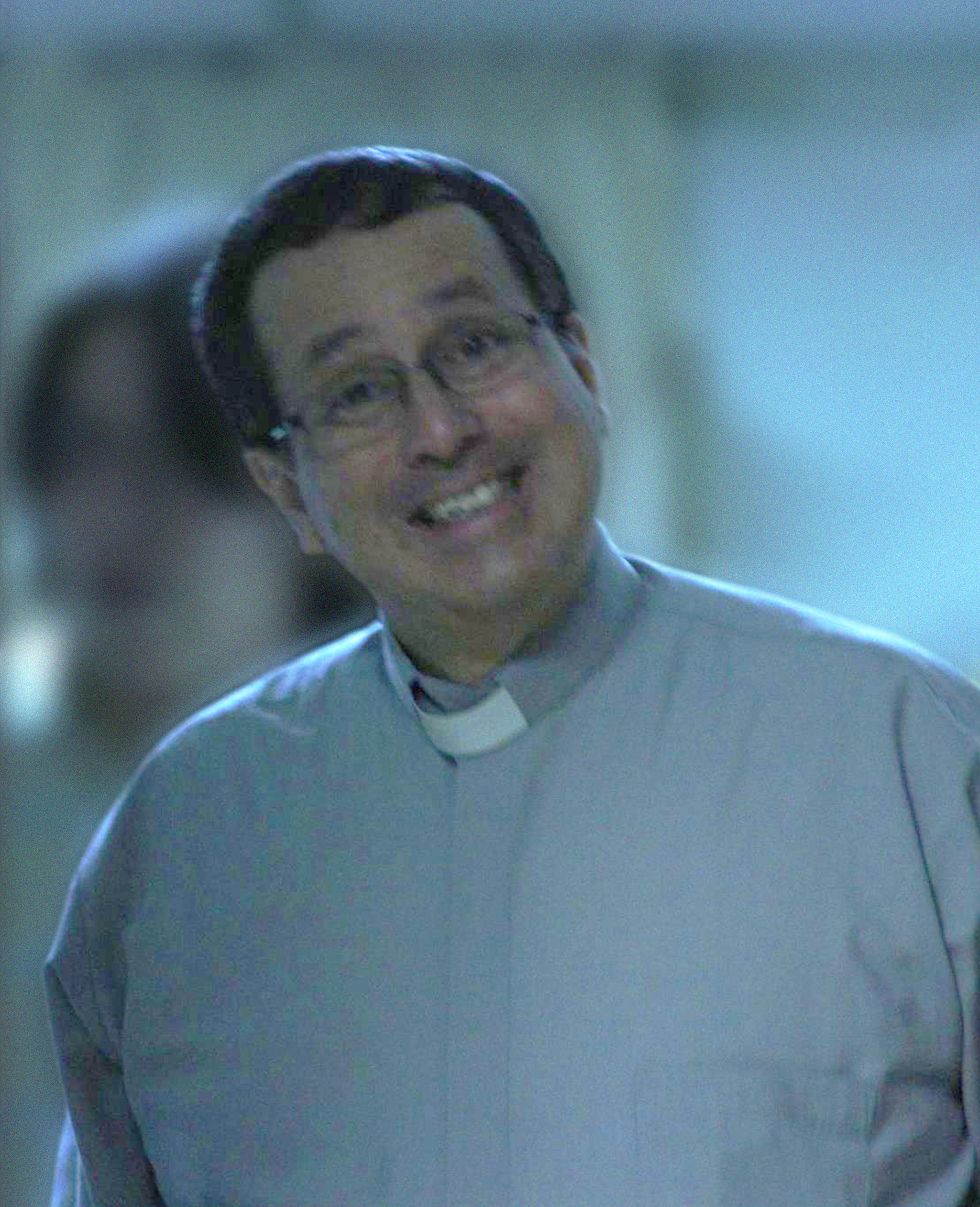
- Father Luis Fernando Intriago Páez in may 2011
- Church: Latin Church
- Term ended: 2013

Orders
- Laicized: 2018

Personal details
- Born: Luis Fernando Intriago Páez; 1956 (age 69–70) Guayaquil, Ecuador
- Denomination: Roman Catholic

Luis Fernando Intriago Páez (born 1956) is a secularized priest from Guayaquil, Ecuador. He was parish priest of the Church of Our Lady of Czestochowa (Iglesia Nuestra Señora de Czestochowa) from 1996 to 2013. Intriago was dismissed from his priestly functions by the Archdiocese of Guayaquil after there were complaints that Intriago sexually abused and tortured minors. Intriago told his victims that to help themselves and their families, they needed to suffer through a secret sacrifice, which he named the dynamic of sin (dinámica del pecado). The Catholic Church does not approve such rituals.

Intriago is known for his anti-abortion stance and for founding the Christian Life Movement in Ecuador. Christian Life Movement was founded by Luis Fernando Figari in Peru; he was also accused of sexual, physical, and psychological abuse of minors.

== Biography ==
=== Early life and education ===
Intriago was born in 1956 in Guayaquil, Ecuador, and is the second of four brothers. He graduated from Unidad Educativa Javier, a Jesuit school in Guayaquil.

In his youth he was extroverted and sociable, liked to talk a lot, partied with his friends, and surfed in Montañita and other places on the Santa Elena Peninsula. From the age of 18, Intriago frequently visited the Schoenstatt Shrine in Guayaquil. He was part of Christian group for eight years, which brought him closer to the Catholic faith. When he was 26 years old and about to finish his studies in civil engineering and marry his girlfriend, Intriago was overwhelmed by a mixture of solitude and emptiness. Shortly after, during a few minutes of reflection at the Schoenstatt Shrine, he decided to give his life to the priesthood.

=== Priestly life ===
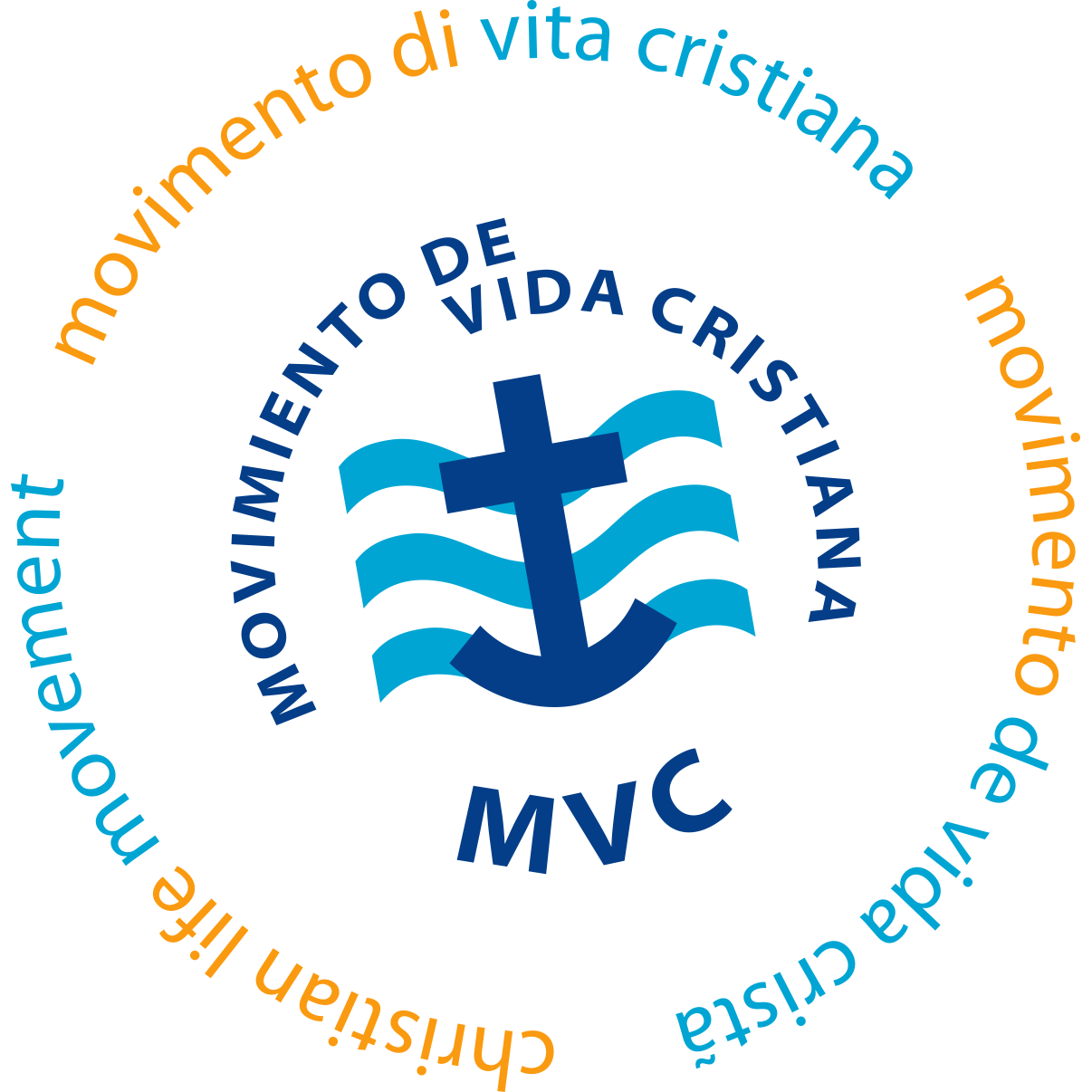
Logo of the Christian Life Movement

Intriago worked in the neighborhood parishes of Guayaquil—Urdesa and La Alborada. In 1996 he became the parish priest of the Church of Our Lady of Czestochowa (Iglesia Nuestra Señora de Czestochowa). There he exercised his priestly duties and organized the processions of Holy Week, with religious groups such as the Legion of Mary, Montaña Clara, Charismatic Movement, Matrimonio para Cristo, and Christian Life Movement.

In 2002, Intriago founded the Catholic group Christian Life Movement in Guayaquil. There he counseled young people. The group had more the 1,500 members in 2005.

== Scandal of sexual abuse and torture of minors ==
=== Background ===
In 2003, he was informally and repeatedly reprimanded by the Congregation for the Doctrine of the Faith for active homosexual behavior. He was again reprimanded in 2009 when the congregation was made aware that Intriago was having nocturnal encounters with minors who were members of the Christian Life Movement.

=== Precedents ===
Intriago was accused of sexual abuse and torture of minors by means of a practice (dynamic of sin (dinámica del pecado)) not recognized by the Catholic Church. In 2013 Archbishop Antonio Arregui suspended him from his priestly activities. He befriended the founder of the Christian Life Movement, Luis Fernando Figari (also accused of sexual abuse of minors), in Lima, and brought the Christian Life Movement to Ecuador.

=== The dynamic of sin ===
Starting in 2013, Intriago was accused of sexual abuse and torture of minors. Intriago was able to manipulate the minors by telling them that a heavenly voice had told him that they were the chosen ones, the anointed, who would change the world.

Intriago researched the private lives of the minors. He chose minors who had economic, emotional, or familial problems, as well as minors who had family members with incurable diseases. After he gained the trust of the minor, he proposed that the minor suffer the dynamic of sin, which consisted of a series of acts and sessions ranging from light to strong.

In this rite Intriago fulfilled the function of the devil and the world, and the minor served the function of himself—as a Christian Catholic who would fight against the world and would have to feel the damage and pain of sin. The minor was stripped of clothes until half-naked or naked, blindfolded, hands and feet bound, and then hung from a tube. There the minor would suffer through a series of torture, such as blow or electric shocks. Intriago would also pass his scratchy beard over the face and body of the victim, wrestle with the minor, and crush the victim by lying on top of them. During the rite, Intriago was also half-naked and would have skin-to-skin contact with the victim.

After finishing the right, Intriago told the victim that the rite was for the purpose of improving the world, improving the victim's life, improving the health of a family member in serious condition, or any other problems that may be happening. He always made it clear that they had to keep it secret—it should only be between Intriago, the abused minor, and God. Intriago justified this secret with biblical-sounding phrases like "do not let your left hand know what your right hand is doing because it would not understand".

=== Complaint ===
The first to denounce Intriago for these acts was Juan José Bayas in 2013. Bayas was 23 years old at the time, but he suffered through the dynamics of sin when he was 15.

=== Sentence ===
On May 12, 2018, Intriago faced 25 years of jail.

== See also ==
- Luis Fernando Figari
- Karadima case
- Crimen sollicitationis
- Catholic Church sexual abuse cases
- Christian Life Movement
- Sodalitium Christianae Vitae
- Sodalit Family
- Marcial Maciel
