= José Antonio Eguren =

Peruvian Catholic bishop

The Most Reverend José Antonio Eguren SCV
- Archbishop of Piura
- Archdiocese: Archdiocese of Piura
- Elected: July 16, 2006
- Retired: April 2, 2024
- Predecessor: Oscar Rolando Cantuarias Pastor

Orders
- Ordination: December 12, 1982 by Juan Landázuri Ricketts
- Consecration: April 7, 2002 by Juan Luis Cipriani Thorne

Personal details
- Born: José Antonio Eguren Anselmi; 14 June 1956 (age 70) Lima, Peru
- Motto: Remis Velisque
- Coat of arms

José Antonio Eguren Anselmi (born 14 June 1956) is a Peruvian prelate of the Catholic Church who was Archbishop of Piura from 2006 to 2024. He was Auxiliary Bishop of Lima from 2002 to 2006.

He is a member of the Sodalitium Christianae Vitae (SCV).

== Biography ==
José Antonio Eguren Anselmi was born on 14 June 1956 in Lima, Peru, the son of Alejandro Eguren Bresani and Blanca Anselmi.

He entered the Pontifical Catholic University of Peru and about the same time joined the SCV., becoming a member of its founding generation. He then studied philosophy and theology in Lima, earning a degree in sacred theology.

On 9 July 1981 he took his perpetual vows as a member of the SCV.

He spent 1982 at the Major Seminary of Medellín in Colombia, and pursued specialized studies in Spirituality and Liturgy at the Pastoral Theology Institute of Episcopal Conference of Latin America (CELAM).

He was ordained a priest on 12 December 1982 by Cardinal Juan Landázuri Ricketts and became a priest of the Archdiocese of Lima in February 2001 when Pope John Paul II granted the SCV the right to incardinate its own priests.

In addition to work within the SCV, Eguren from 1985 to 1989 was secretary of the Liturgy Commission of the Peruvian Bishops' Conference. From December 1991 to February 2002, he was pastor of Nuestra Señora de la Reconciliación in Lima. In November 2000 he was named episcopal vicar with responsibility for apostolic movements as well as a member Archdiocesan College of Consiltors.

On 16 February 2002, Pope John Paul II appointed him titular bishop of Castello di Ripa and Auxiliary Bishop of Lima. He received his episcopal consecration on 7 April from Cardinal Juan Luis Cipriani Thorne.

On 11 July 2006, Pope Benedict XVI named him Archbishop of Piura. He was installed there on 22 August. Pope Francis accepted his resignation as archbishop on 2 April 2024, seven years before he reached the retirement age for Catholic prelates.

== Defamation lawsuits ==
In January 2018, Peruvian journalist Pedro Salinas published articles online that compared Eguren to Bishop Juan Barros, who was then the center of the clerical sex abuse scandal in Chile. He wrote that Eguren "knew everything" about abuse committed by the founder of SCV, Luis Fernando Figari, and accused him of participating in illegal real estate transactions. When Salinas refused to retract several statements, Eguren sued him, submitting a criminal complaint alleging aggravated defamation in August 2018. In October Eguren sued a second journalist, Paola Ugaz, for defamation for statements similar to those made by Salinas. She later said: "With this complaint, Eguren demonstrates himself as the 'star' student of Figari, who established a culture of abuse and cover-up." Salinas and Ugaz are co-authors of Half Monks, Half Soldiers (2015), an exposé of sexual, psychological and physical abuse on the part of the SCV's leadership. Though the charges carry both fines and prison sentences, Eguren was not seeking more than a verdict in his favor and any fine imposed could be paid to a charity.

In February 2019, Martin Scheuch, a former SCV member who was testifying in defense of Salinas, described Eguren as "very sentimental and affectionate" in contrast to the rest of the SCV leaders, but lacking "an analytical ability and critical spirit". He said Eguren's behavior was "no different substantially than what other people in positions of authority in the Sodalitium did" and that he witnessed Figari's behavior but lacked the capacity to recognize its severity. He said "either he was unable to see the excesses and disorders that that way of life implied, or he simply ignored them out of fidelity to the institution".

On 28 February 2019, Amnesty International expressed concern that the legal proceedings were in criminal court. It asked Peruvian authorities to "ensure that the judicial system is not used to harass or discredit critical voices by imposing punishments for the peaceful exercise of the right to freedom of expression".

Salinas was found guilty in April 2019, fined $24,000, and given a one-year suspended sentence. In response, the Peruvian Bishops' Conference expressed support for Salinas, saying that he "sought to clarify the truth" about the SCV. Their statement said that Pope Francis wanted them "to prioritize the compensation and attention to the victims of every type of abuse, condemning any form of complicity" and that he had "praised and thanked the work of the journalists who, through their investigations, contribute to denouncing the abuses, punishing the perpetrators and assisting the victims". The statement called for solidarity with victims of abuse and those who expose it. The case provoked a political discussion about decriminalizing defamation to remove the threat of prison. Eguren withdrew his complaint against Salinas on 24 April, nullifying Salinas' sentence, which he said had produced "a series of unjustified reactions, including inside of the Church".
