= Daniel Thomas Turley Murphy =

Catholic bishop (born 1943)

His Excellency, The Most Reverend Daniel Thomas Turley OSA, DD
- Bishop Emeritus of Chulucanas
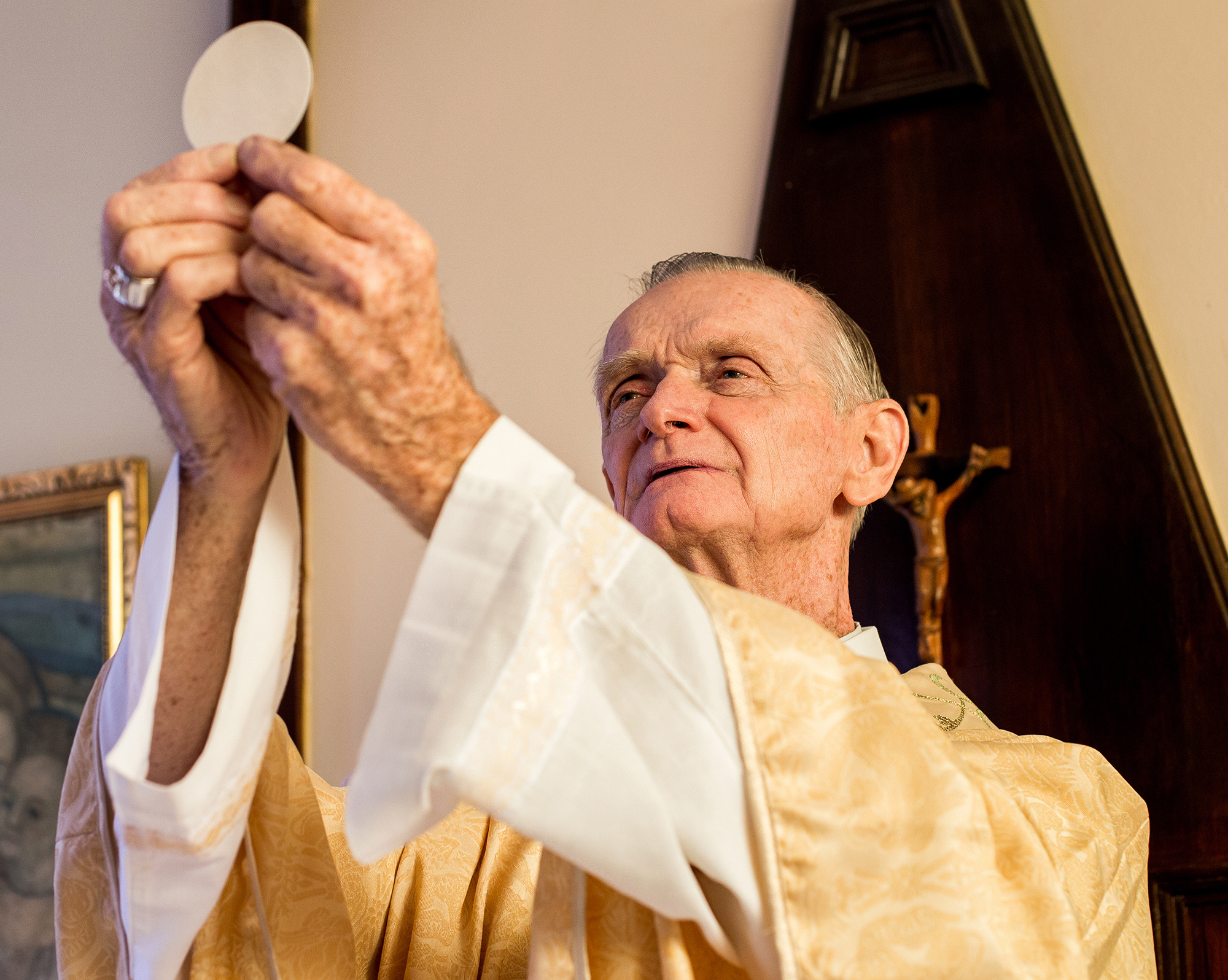
- Turley in 2018
- Church: Roman Catholic Church
- See: Chulucanas
- Appointed: May 25, 1996
- Installed: October 28, 2000
- Term ended: January 10, 2025
- Predecessor: Juan Conway McNabb
- Successor: Cristóbal Bernardo Mejía Corral
- Previous post: Coadjutor Bishop of Chulucanas (1996-2000)

Orders
- Ordination: December 21, 1968
- Consecration: August 17, 1996 by Juan Conway McNabb, Fortunato Baldelli, Oscar Rolando Cantuarias Pastor

Personal details
- Born: January 25, 1943 (age 83) Chicago, Illinois, U.S.

Daniel Thomas Turley (born January 25, 1943) is an American born bishop in the Catholic Church and is the bishop emeritus of the Diocese of Chulucanas in the Piura Region of Peru, serving from 2000 until April 2, 2020.

== Biography ==
=== Early life and priesthood ===
Daniel Turley was born in Chicago, Illinois to Anne and John Turley; he has a brother and a sister. He attended high school at Mendel Catholic High School in Chicago, graduating in 1960 and participating in the math club and baseball. He professed simple vows in the Province of Our Mother of Good Counsel in the Order of St. Augustine on September 4, 1961, and took solemn vows three years later. He was ordained a Catholic priest on December 21, 1968, and began to work as a missionary in Peru the following year. During the internal conflict in Peru in the 1980s and 1990s, Turley worked in the Pacaipampa District and served as local superior at the same time that Robert Prevost, the future Leo XIV, was working in the area. In 1987, the Augustinians created a specific vicariate serving the church in Peru with Turley in charge. Members of the Shining Path attacked Turley's parish church, as well as bombing the mayor's office of the town.

=== Episcopacy ===
On May 25, 1996, Pope John Paul II named Turley as the coadjutor bishop of the Diocese of Chulucanas. He was ordained a bishop on August 17, 1996, by Bishop Juan Conway McNabb, OSA of Chulucanas. The co-consecrators were Archbishop Fortunato Baldelli the Apostolic Nuncio to Peru and Oscar Rolando Cantuarias Pastor of Piura. He succeeded to the See of Chulucanas upon the resignation of Bishop McNabb on October 28, 2000. In 2005, Turley attempted to mediate conflict between Peruvian miners in Piura and the mining company when a protest march of miners was stopped by police and seven civilians were killed. His advocacy against foreign interests mining in Peru prompted death threats.

He was elected to the Permanent Council of the Peruvian Bishops' Conference. He was awarded an honorary Doctor of Humane Letters by Villanova University.

In February 2020, Pope Francis accepted Turley's resignation from his office as bishop of Chulucanas and appointed Cristóbal Bernardo Mejía Corral as his successor. Upon retirement he returned to his native Chicago and works with Augustinian pre-novices as well as in the Confirmation program for the Archdiocese of Chicago.

In 2025, he was named the rector of the National Shrine of Saint Frances Xavier Cabrini.
