= Crece =

Chilean non-profit organisation

Crece is an international educational non-profit founded in Santiago, Chile in 2005 by a group of Catholic university students associated with the Christian Life Movement. The non-profit first began with the name CreceChile and later expanded internationally. Crece's mission is to support disadvantaged families through an integral education. This concretely occurs through the education of adults who have not completed their high school education, and prepares them to be able to pass the US equivalent GED in their respective countries.

Crece is actively present in Argentina as CreceArgentina, Colombia as ColombiaCrece and Angola as CreceAngola.
