= Intriago =

Intriago is a surname of Spanish origin. People with the surname include:

- Álvaro Pérez Intriago (1936–2016), Ecuadorian politician
- Alfredo Intriago (born 1970), Ecuadorian international referee
- Francisco Ovidio Vera Intriago (1941–2014), Roman Catholic bishop
- Jefferson Intriago (born 1996), Ecuadorian footballer
- Luis Fernando Intriago Páez (born 1956) is a secularized priest from Guayaquil.
