= Fortunato Pablo Urcey =

His Excellency, The Most Reverend Fortunato Pablo Urcey
- Prelate Emeritus of Chota
- Church: Roman Catholic
- Diocese: Territorial Prelature of Chota
- Appointed: 22 December 2014
- Installed: 29 January 2015
- Predecessor: José Carmelo Martínez Lázaro, O.A.R.
- Successor: Víctor Emiliano Villegas Suclupe, O.A.R.

Orders
- Ordination: 5 July 1971
- Consecration: 12 December 2005

Personal details
- Born: 13 March 1947 (age 79) Estollo, Spain

Styles of Fortunato Pablo Urcey
- Reference style: His Excellency; The Most Reverend
- Spoken style: Your Excellency
- Religious style: Bishop

Fortunato Pablo Urcey O.A.R. (born 13 March 1947) is a prelate of the Roman Catholic Church. Between 2005 and 2022 he was the prelate of the Territorial Prelature of Chota, Peru, an administrative division of the Church that, unlike a diocese, is assigned to the care of a religious order.

== Biography ==
He was born in Estollo (La Rioja), Spain. He joined the Order of Augustinian Recollects in 1964 and took his final vows in the order in 1968. He studied at the Pontifical University of Salamanca, earning a degree in theology. He was ordained a priest on 5 July 1971. He spent his first years as a priest doing parish work in Chota from 1972 to 1978. He then held teaching positions in Salamanca, Logroño and Lima. Then, based in Madrid, he took on responsibilities in the administration of the Recollects as provincial secretary responsible for publications. He was Prior of the province from 1999 to 2005.

Pope Benedict XVI named him head of the Territorial Prelature of Chota, Peru, on 15 October 2005 and he was ordained a bishop on 12 December of that year by Emiliano Antonio Cisneros Martínez, Bishop of Chachapoyas, Peru, and a former prelate of Chota.

He was elected to a term as Secretary General of the Peruvian Episcopal Conference for the years 2014 to 2017.

In April 2015, the Congregation for Institutes of Consecrated Life and Societies of Apostolic Life named Urcey an apostolic visitor tasked with investigating charges of "improper behavior" on the part of Luis Fernando Figari, founder of the Sodalitium Christianae Vitae. His work in Peru was scheduled to last from August 2015 to March 2016. Urcey reported that while Figari was Superior General he had "adopted a style of government excessively or improperly authoritarian, directed to impose one's own will," and that "in order to obtain the obedience of his brothers [he] used improper strategies and methods of persuasion, that is to say, underhanded, arrogant and nonetheless violent and disrespectful of the right to the inviolability of one's own interiority and discretion". On 30 January 2017, as a result of Urcey's investigation, the Congregation decreed that Figari should have no further contact with members of the Sodalit community.

On 9 March 2018, Urcey was elected President of Caritas Peru (Cáritas del Perú) for the three-year term 2018-2021.
