= Luciano Maza Huamán =

Peruvian Catholic priest

The Most Reverend Luciano Maza Huamán
- Archbishop of Piura
- Church: Catholic Church
- Archdiocese: Piura
- Elected: 12 December 2025
- Predecessor: José Antonio Eguren

Orders
- Ordination: 25 March 1987
- Consecration: 21 February 2026

Personal details
- Born: June 4, 1957 (age 69) Castilla, Peru
- Education: San Luis Gonzaga Seminary; Facultad de Teología Pontificia y Civil de Lima
- Motto: Fiat mihi secundum verbum tuum (Latin for 'May it be done to me according to your word')
- Coat of arms

Styles of Luciano Maza Huamán
- Reference style: His Excellency; The Most Reverend
- Spoken style: Your Excellency
- Religious style: Archbishop

Luciano Maza Huamán (born 4 December 1957) is a Peruvian Catholic prelate and the metropolitan archbishop of Piura. Appointed by Pope Leo XIV on 12 December 2025, he was consecrated a bishop and took canonical possession on 21 February 2026.

Maza Huamán previously served as the vicar general of the Archdiocese of Piura and as a seminary educator. His appointment followed a 20-month vacancy in the archdiocese after the resignation of Archbishop José Antonio Eguren. Commentators, such as theologian Veronique Lecaros of the Pontifical Catholic University of Peru, noted Maza Huamán's background as a parish priest in rural communities, contrasting his pastoral approach with the leadership of the previous administration.
