= Jacqueline Fowks =

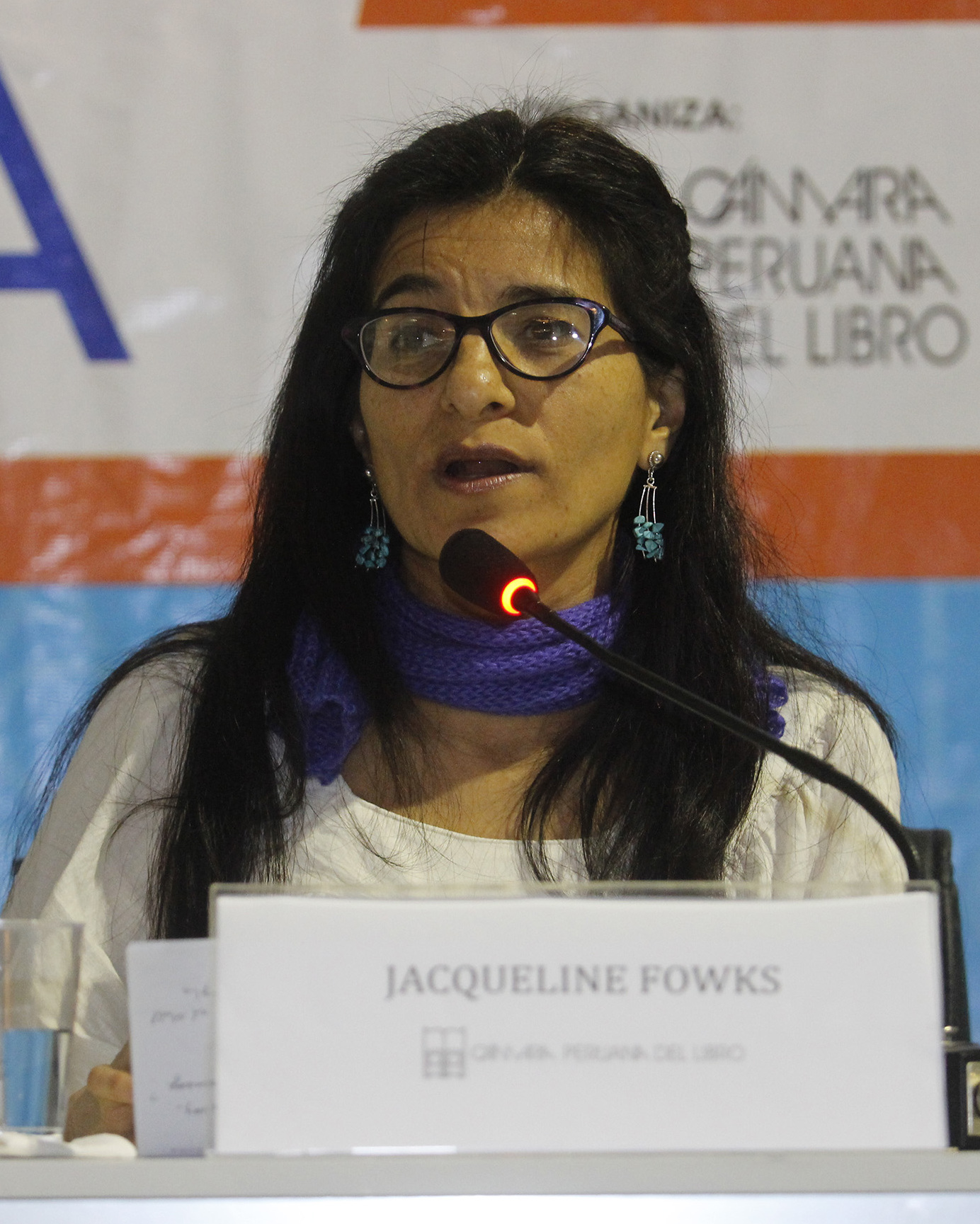
in 2016 at Ricardo Palma Book Fair

Jacqueline Fowks de la Flor is a Peruvian investigative journalist and university professor.

== Career ==
She earned a degree in Communication Sciences from the University of Lima and a master's degree in communication from the National Autonomous University of Mexico in 1997.

As a founding member of IDL-Reporteros, she investigated the violence during the internal armed conflict in Huancavelica. She has collaborated with national media outlets, working as a writer and editor for El Comercio, Perú 21, and La República, and international publications such as El País (since 2012) and Unomásuno. She has also been a correspondent in Brazil and Peru for the newspaper Reforma, Brecha, La Republica, and for Reporters Without Borders. She is also a part-time professor at the Pontifical Catholic University of Peru.

From 2018 to 2020, she was president of the Foreign Press Association in Peru (APEP).

During the 2021 Peruvian general election, like other members of the press such as Paola Ugaz, she was the target of attacks and harassment by far-right groups.

== Works ==
- Suma y resta de la realidad. Medios de comunicación y elecciones generales 2000 en el Perú (2000)
- Medios de Comunicación (2008)
- Chichapolitik: la prensa con Fujimori en las elecciones generales 2000 en el Perú (2015)
- Prensa extranjera en el Perú: 50 años de historias (editora, 2016)
- Fowks, Jacqueline (2017). Mecanismos de la posverdad (in Spanish). ISBN 978-9972-663-95-6.
