= Christianae =

Christianae may refer to:

- Christianae Religionis Institutio is John Calvin's seminal work on Protestant systematic theology.
- Christianae Reipublicae is an encyclical of Pope Clement XIII of 1766 on the dangers of anti-Christian writings.
- Disputationes de Controversiis Christianae Fidei adversus hujus temporis Haereticos is a work on dogmatics by Robert Bellarmine.
- Sapientiae Christianae is an 1890 encyclical of Pope Leo XIII.
- Sodalitium Christianae Vitae is a Society of Apostolic Life founded by Luis Fernando Figari in 1971.
- Vigiliae Christianae is a review of early Christian life and language.
