= Juan Conway McNabb =

Most Reverend Juan C. McNabb OSA, DD
- Bishop of Chulucanas
- Church: Roman Catholic Church
- See: Chulucanas
- In office: December 12, 1988–October 28, 2000
- Successor: Daniel Thomas Turley Murphy
- Previous post: Prelate of Chulucanas (1964–1988)

Orders
- Ordination: May 24, 1952
- Consecration: June 17, 1967

Personal details
- Born: December 11, 1925 Beloit, Wisconsin, U.S.
- Died: February 26, 2016 (aged 90) Evergreen Park, Illinois, U.S.

Ordination history of Juan Conway McNabb
History
Episcopal consecration
- Consecrated by: John Patrick Cody
Episcopal succession
Bishops consecrated by Juan Conway McNabb as principal consecrator
- Daniel Thomas Turley Murphy: August 17, 1996

Juan Conway McNabb (December 11, 1925 – February 26, 2016) was an American born bishop in the Catholic Church and served as the first bishop of the Diocese of Chulucanas in the Piura Region of Peru from 1988 to 2000.

== Biography ==
John Conway McNabb was born in Beloit, Wisconsin and professed religious vows in the Order of St. Augustine. He was ordained a Catholic priest on May 24, 1952. He taught in high schools sponsored by the Augustinian Community in Chicago, Illinois and St. Louis, Missouri. On March 4, 1964, McNabb was named the first ordinary of the Prelature of Chulucanas by Pope Paul VI. He attended the third and fourth sessions of the Second Vatican Council as a voting member.

The prelature was 14,000 square miles (36,000 km^{2}) and its area was about two thirds mountains and one-third desert. When McNabb came to the area there were no telephones, roads or electricity. There were 140,000 people in the territory and almost all of them were Catholic. There were only a few diocesan priests and six Franciscan priests from Sicily. He was not fluent in Spanish and so he utilized the services of an interpreter until he became fluent.

On April 8, 1967, Paul VI named McNabb Titular Bishop of Saia Maior, and he was ordained a bishop on June 17, 1967. Archbishop John Patrick Cody of Chicago was the ordaining prelate. Bishop Petrus Canisius Jean van Lierde of the Roman Curia and Archbishop Erasmo Hinojosa Hurtado of Piura were the principal co-consecrators. Beginning in 1985, McNabb was assisted in his work by the newly-ordained Robert Prevost, the future Pope Leo XIV, who served as diocesan chancellor and as an aide to McNabb. On December 12, 1988, John Paul II raised the prelature to a diocese and McNabb became its first bishop.

Because so many of the people in the diocese lived a long way from parish churches or chapels, and there were so few priests to minister to them, a pastoral plan was developed to establish small Christian communities and train lay people as catechists. McNabb stated, "When I left (Chulucanas), there was only one priest for every 14,000 people, but you had 23,000 of the laity collaborating on parish ministry in a common program. So, there was someone in ministry for every 23 people."

McNabb had coronary artery bypass surgery in 1990 and in 1996 Daniel Thomas Turley Murphy was named coadjutor bishop of the diocese. Pope John Paul II accepted McNabb's resignation on October 28, 2000, and he returned to the United States. After he left Chulucanas he ministered among Latinos in Illinois, and then became pastor of St. Clare of Montefalco parish in Grosse Pointe Park, Michigan in 2002.

=== Death ===
McNabb died on February 26, 2016, aged 90 at Mercy Circle in Evergreen Park, Illinois from congestive heart failure.
