= Sodalit Family =

SCV associates

The Sodalit Family is the group of people, institutions and works that are associated with the spirituality that has arisen from foundation of the Sodalitium Christianae Vitae (SCV).

In the history of the Catholic Church there have been many spiritual families which have arisen, each with a specific style and charism that have responded to the specific needs of their time. The Sodalit Spirituality is a new ecclesial initiative coming from the Second Vatican Council.

All those who participate in the Sodalit Family do so personally, and therefore any member of the Church may do so, regardless of age. Its members are those who seek to live the Sodalit spirituality.

Following investigation of sexual and psychological abuse of members, including children, of the Sodalitium Christianae Vitae by its founder, Luis Fernando Figari, and other Sodalites, and Figari's expulsion, there were calls for the suppression of the SCV.

== Members ==
Members of the Sodalit Family form part of different associations:

- Sodalitium Christianae Vitae
- Christian Life Movement
- The Servants of the Plan of God
- The Sorority of Our Lady of Reconciliation
- The Association of Mary Immaculate

The Sodalit Family is also made up of those who actively participate in the numerous activities and projects that have come about from the Sodalit Spirituality.
