= Oscar Rolando Cantuarias Pastor =

Peruvian Catholic bishop (1931–2011)

- Archbishop of Piura
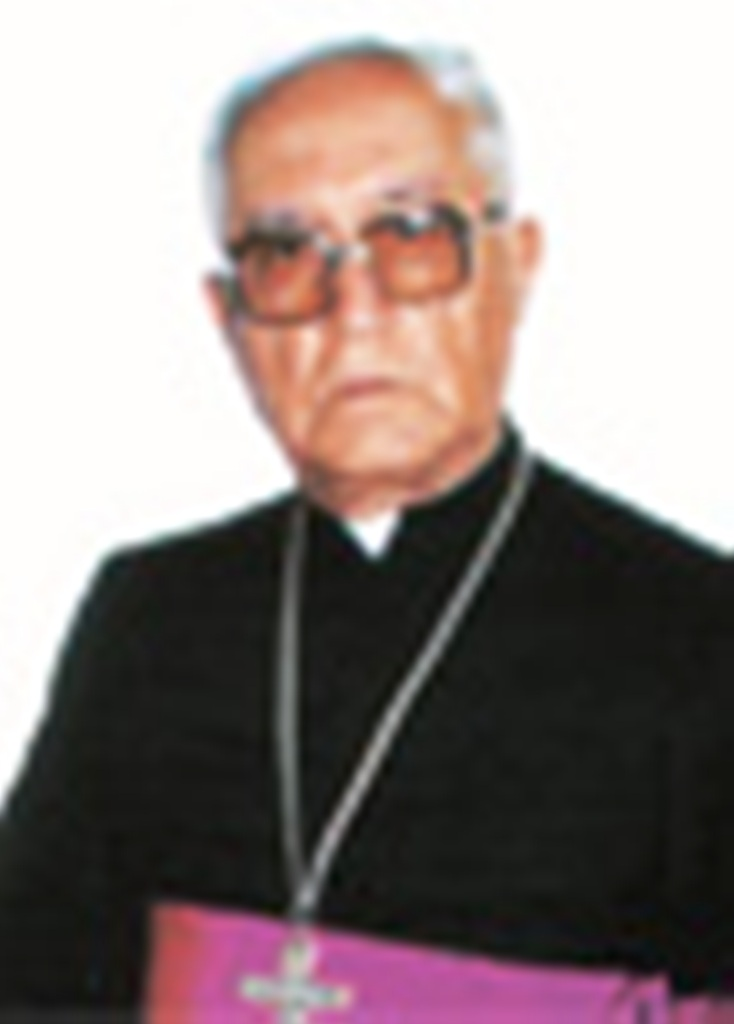
- Church: Catholic Church
- Archdiocese: Archdiocese of Piura
- In office: 9 September 1981 – 11 July 2006
- Predecessor: Fernando Vargas Ruiz de Somocurcio
- Successor: José Antonio Eguren
- Previous post: Bishop of Tacna (1973-1981)

Orders
- Ordination: 17 December 1955
- Consecration: 2 December 1973 by Juan Landázuri Ricketts

Personal details
- Born: 13 May 1931 Ascope, Department of Trujillo, Peruvian Republic
- Died: 8 November 2011 (aged 80) Lima, Peru

Oscar Rolando Cantuarias Pastor (13 May 1931 – 8 November 2011) was the Roman Catholic archbishop of the Roman Catholic Archdiocese of Piura, Peru.

Cantuaris was born in Ascope. Ordained to the priesthood in 1955, he became a bishop in 1973. He retired as archbishop emeritus on 11 July 2006, and died in Lima on 8 November 2011, aged 80.
