= Episcopal Conference of Peru =

Assembly of Catholic bishops

The Peruvian Episcopal Conference (Spanish: Conferencia Episcopal Peruana) is an episcopal conference of the Roman Catholic Church of Peru that gathers the bishops of the country in order to discuss pastoral issues and in general all matters that have to do with the Church.

The following are members of the Conference:

- The diocesan bishops and others considered such de jure;
- The coadjutor bishops;
- The auxiliary bishops;
- The titular bishops by appointment of the Holy See or the Conference itself;

Guests of the Conference are the Apostolic Nuncio and other bishops (titular and emeritus).

== Secretary General ==
- Fortunato Urcey, Prelate of Chota (2014–2017)

== See also ==
- Roman Catholicism in Peru
