= Diocese of Chulucanas =

Roman Catholic diocese in Peru

Coordinates: 5.0972°S 80.1612°W

Diocese of Chulucanas Dioecesis Chulucanensis

Catholic

Location
- Country: Peru

Statistics
- Area: 12,498 km^{2} (4,826 sq mi)
- Population: Total; Catholics: (as of 2006); 485,000; 435,000 (89.7%)

Information
- Sui iuris church: Latin Church
- Cathedral: Catedral la Sagrada Familia

Current leadership
- Pope: Leo XIV
- Bishop: Cristóbal Bernardo Mejía Corral
- Bishops emeritus: Daniel Thomas Turley Murphy

The Roman Catholic Diocese of Chulucanas (Latin: Chulucanen(sis)) is a diocese located in the city of Chulucanas in the ecclesiastical province of Piura in Peru.

== History ==
- 4 March 1964: Established as the Territorial Prelature of Chulucanas
- 12 December 1988: Promoted as Diocese of Chulucanas

The first Peruvian assignment for Robert Prevost was as chancellor here. In 2024, he led its anniversary celebrations; in May 2025, he was elected as Pope Leo XIV.

== Bishops ==
=== Ordinaries ===
- Prelate of Chulucanas
  - Bishop Juan Conway McNabb (1964.03.04 – 1988.12.12); see below
- Bishops of Chulucanas
  - Bishop Juan Conway McNabb (1988.12.12 – 2000.10.28); see above
  - Bishop Daniel Thomas Turley Murphy (2000.10.28 – 2020.04.02)
  - Bishop Cristóbal Bernardo Mejía Corral (2020.04.02 - present)

=== Coadjutor bishop ===
- Daniel Thomas Turley Murphy (1996-2000)

=== Other priest of this diocese who became bishop ===
- Tarcisio Pusma Ibáñez, appointed auxiliary bishop of Trujillo in 2008; did not take effect

== See also ==
- Roman Catholicism in Peru
