= CreceChile =

CreceChile was founded in 2005 by a group of young Catholic university students that sought to promote the integral growth of the human person through educational projects. Later, this initiative became a non-profit organization that seeks to support disadvantaged families through education. CreceChile is also part of the international organization Crece which is also present in Argentina, Colombia and Angola.

== History ==
In 2005, a group of 5 friends, and members of the Christian Life Movement, working in a community in Maipú, Chile realized that many adults had not finished high school. This experience led to the possibility of educating and preparing a small group of adults to take the US equivalent GED.

The first class of consisted of 26 adults of which 90% passed the exam. This first experience led these young university students to form a more formal educational program that could respond to the greater needs of the Chilean population. Three years later, the number of adults preparing for the GED had grown tenfold. Today, CreceChile assists more than 600 adults complete their high school education and receives support from more than 175 volunteers in 6 different regions in Chile.

== Activities ==
The mission of CreceChile is to create an educational community, based on Catholic Values, to promote the integral growth of the human person. It's concretely done through educational projects in sectors with scarce resources with the principal goal of building a more human and solidary society.

The results that CreceChile attempts to achieve for their students are: better wages, higher probabilities that their own children will complete high school and also that their children will have greater access to high education.

CreceChile attracts professionals who go through an educational and teaching training to be able to later donate their time in the classroom teaching adults. CreceChile's program is also geared towards providing its volunteers with skills and talents that will later help them in their job and their family.

== Awards and recognition ==
The Ministerio de Desarrollo Social (Department of Social Development) and the President of Chile, Sebastián Piñera, awarded CreceChile with the “Sello Más por Chile” award in 2012 and in 2013 for their “commitment to the improvement of the quality of life and development”. They were also pointed out for their “training tools and level of studies” provided to those adults that had not finished their high school education.
