= Florentino Armas Lerena =

Roman Catholic bishop

Florentino Armas Lerena (born 1900 in San Millán de la Cogolla) was a Spanish clergyman and prelate for the Roman Catholic Territorial Prelature of Chota. He was appointed bishop in 1963. He died in 1979.
