= Paola Ugaz =

Peruvian writer

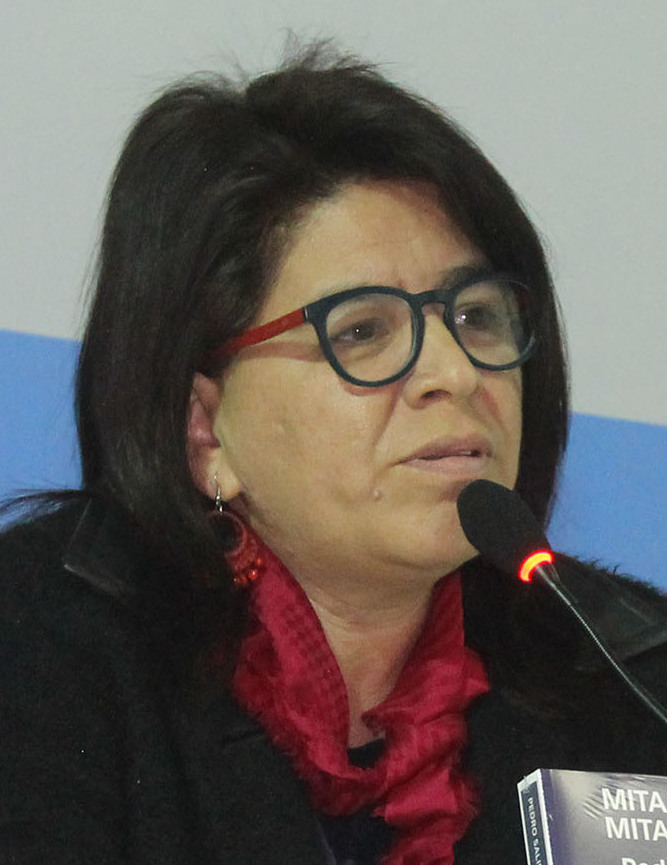
- Paola Ugaz in 2018
- Born: 1974 (age 51–52); Lima, Peru
- Occupation: Investigative journalist

Paola Margot Ugaz Cruz (born 1974) is a Peruvian investigative journalist, known for having uncovered cases of child sexual abuse committed by the Peruvian Catholic society Sodalitium Christianae Vitae. She is the director of Nativa TV.

== Early life and education ==
Paola Ugaz was born in Lima, Peru, in 1974. She attended the Pontifical Catholic University of Peru.

== Career ==
Ugaz began her journalism career in 1999 as a reporter for the magazine Caretas. She later worked as a producer for the Canal N program Entrelíneas. As a correspondent, she has written for Europa Press, the EFE news agency, Terra magazine, and ABC. She has also contributed to the newspaper La República and the magazines Etiqueta Negra, Etiqueta Verde and Hola Perú.

With fellow journalist Gustavo Gorriti, in 2009 she collaborated on the book Petroaudios, which covered a significant case of political corruption. Her other books include Punche Perú (2010), about the conditions faced by Peruvian dockworkers. In 2009, she was a founding contributor to the online publication IDL-Reporteros. She is currently the director of the digital channel Nativa TV, for which she hosts the program A fondo.

In the 2010s, Ugaz worked on the Chalina de la Esperanza initiative, which sought to honor victims of the Peruvian conflict.

=== Investigation into Sodalitium ===
Along with her colleague Pedro Salinas, Ugaz launched an investigation into alleged cases of sexual, physical, and psychological abuse of young boys committed under the auspices of Sodalitium Christianae Vitae, also known in Spanish as Sodalicio de Vida Cristiana, a society of apostolic life founded in Peru in 1971 by Luis Fernando Figari. After five years of work, the reporters published Mitad monjes, mitad soldados in 2015. The book's publication led the Public Ministry of Peru to open an investigation. Figari was sanctioned by the Vatican and went into exile.

In response to her journalistic work, Ugaz has been the victim of a disinformation and defamation campaign, including digital attacks, death threats, and legal battles. The archbishop of Piura, Antonio Eguren Anselmi, issued a complaint in 2018, but it was withdrawn the following year after the Vatican intervened. She was also targeted with legal cases brought by real estate manager Alberto Gómez de la Torre, whose company allegedly had ties with Sodalitium. In 2019, she was identified as the journalist facing the most lawsuits in Peru. Her opponents have also targeted Ugaz's husband, British journalist Dan Collyns, over her work.

Ugaz received a Courage in Journalism Award from the International Women's Media Foundation in 2021. In 2023, her case was featured in a London exhibition by PEN International. In 2025, a play titled Proyecto Ugaz dramatized her investigation.
