= Fernando Vargas Ruiz de Somocurcio =

Peruvian Jesuit and archbishop

Fernando Vargas Ruiz de Somocurcio S.J.
- Archbishop of Arequipa
- Church: Catholic Church
- Archdiocese: Archdiocese of Arequipa
- In office: 26 September 1980 – 2 March 1996
- Predecessor: Leonardo José Rodríguez Ballón
- Successor: Luis Sánchez-Moreno Lira
- Previous posts: Archbishop of Piura (1978-1980); Bishop of Huaraz (1971-1978)

Orders
- Ordination: 17 December 1949
- Consecration: 13 November 1971 by Luigi Poggi

Personal details
- Born: 8 March 1918 Arequipa, Department of Arequipa, Peruvian Republic
- Died: 8 December 2003 (aged 85) Lima, Peru

Fernando Vargas Ruiz de Somocurcio (8 March 1918 – 8 December 2003) was a Peruvian Jesuit who served as the Metropolitan Archbishop of Arequipa.

== Biography ==
Monsignor Fernando Vargas Ruiz de Somocurcio was the son of Alberto Vargas Carbajal and Carmen Ruiz de Somocurcio. He did his studies at the Colegio San José, where he would later be the headmaster.

== Episcopate ==
In 1972 he was named Bishop of Huaraz, working for the reconstruction of the zone that was devastated by a powerful earthquake in 1970. On 12 January 1978, he was named Archbishop of Piura y Tumbes.

On 26 December 1980, he was assigned Archbishop of Arequipa by Pope John Paul II, an office that he would occupy for 15 years. Among his works, the creation of the Archbishop Archive and the organization of the First Congress of Ecclesiastical History stood out. He designed and published the First Pastoral Plan of the Archdiocese. In 1980, he allowed the return of the clergy of the Congregation of Camillus of Lellis, who assumed religious duty in the Honorio Delgado Hospital in the Parish N.S. del Pilar, taking charge of the directing of the play "La Posada". In 1984, he invited the Sodalitium Christianae Vitae to work in Arequipa.

On 21 April 1986, at the request of Prebendary José Francisco Peña y Pbro, Nicolás Factor Herrera Herrera canonically declared the clerical jurisdiction of the new Sanctuary of Chapi as the Archdiocese Sanctuary of Our Lady of the Candlemas of Chapi through Decree N 023-C-ARZ-86.

In 2000 he was named Vice President of the Council for Peace.

In 2002 he was the mediator between the government and the citizens of Arequipa in the conflict over the privatization of the company Egasa.

In 1996 he retired due to the age limit and resided in the Parish of Our Lady of Fatima of Milaflores, the place where he would die of a heart attack the morning of 8 December 2003. His remains were transferred to the city of Arequipa, where he received the farewell from the faithful and the authorities led by the mayor Juan Manuel Guillén in a mass officiated by Bishops Bambarén and Piñeiro, to later be deposited in the Sacristy of the Basilica Cathedral of Arequipa.

== Awards and recognition ==
- Gold Medal of St. Toribio of Mogrovejo (2002)
- Emeritus Archbishop of Arequipa

== See also ==
- Roman Catholicism in Peru
