= Christian Life Movement =

Catholic lay ecclesial movement

The Christian Life Movement (Movimiento de Vida Cristiana, MVC) was a lay Catholic ecclesial movement founded in Peru in 1985 by Luis Fernando Figari, who also founded the Sodalitium Christianae Vitae (SCV). The movement was part of the so-called "Sodalit Family," and while canonically independent, the MVC shared the same spirituality and was functionally subordinated to the SCV. According to its statutes, the MVC’s General Coordinator and Spiritual Assistant were appointed directly by the SCV's Superior General, underscoring a hierarchical relationship between the two entities.

On 14 January 2025, Pope Francis signed the decree suppressing the MVC, along with all other entities founded by Figari. The decree took canonical effect on 14 April 2025, when it was formally notified (intimated) to the movement’s General Coordinator.

The canonical suppression was part of broader disciplinary measures taken by the Holy See after extensive investigations into cases of abuse and governance irregularities within the institutions founded by Figari. The implementation of the decree was entrusted to the Pontifical Commissioner Monsignor Jordi Bertomeu Farnós, acting under the authority of the Dicastery for Institutes of Consecrated Life and Societies of Apostolic Life.

== History ==
The Christian Life Movement was founded in 1985 in Lima, Peru by Luis Fernando Figari. "University Missions", later called "Missionary Action", began in 1978, and today forms part of the Christian Life Movement under the name of CLM Missions. This is an apostolic service in which young people live communally and share spiritually and materially in rural and marginalised urban areas affected by poverty.

The first project outside Peru was founded in 1986 at the invitation of Cardinal Eugenio de Araújo Sales, Archbishop of Rio de Janeiro, Brazil, in the favelas (shanty-towns) of Our Lady of Guidance (Nossa Senhora da Guia) parish, where among the first parishioners to form groups were married couples, who now form part of the Family of Nazareth association of Christian Life Movement. The Bethany association began for adult women the following year.

In 1990 CLM was recognized by the Peruvian Bishops' Conference as a national association and gradually spread to other countries of Latin America. On March 23, 1994, the Pontifical Council for the Laity granted CLM recognition as an international association of the faithful of pontifical right. "CLM aims to be a community forum for encountering the Lord Jesus Christ, which fosters an authentic Christian life by announcing and bearing witness to the faith and the comprehensive advancement of the human person in the light of the Gospel and the Magisterium of the Church."

At its Third Plenary Assembly in 2009, it was announced that CLM would place a new emphasis in its apostolic work on the promotion of life, dignity and the rights of the human person, in addition to its four core areas of evangelization of the young, commitment to solidarity with the poor, the sick and the elderly and abandoned children; the evangelization of the culture and the protection of the family.

== Organization ==
The CLM is directed by a General Coordinator, who is in charge of a General Council of Coordination, made up of the general coordinator, the spiritual assistant and the executive secretary. The current General Coordinator is Alexandre Borges. As of 2006, CLM had a membership of about 25,000 in 21 countries, in Asia, Europe, North America and South America.

Its members participate in various associations, such as:

- Bethlehem Groups, for children
- Marian Groups, for youth and young adults
- Bethany Groups, for adult women
- Emmaus Groups, for adult men
- Nazareth Groups, for married couples

At the local level the CLM is organized in apostolic centers.

== Apostolic activities ==
One of the many activities started by members of the Christian Life Movement is "Crece". The first program began in Chile and is called CreceChile. It was founded in 2005 by a group of young Catholic university students who sought to promote the integral growth of the human person through educational projects. Later, this initiative became a non-profit organization that seeks to support disadvantaged families through education. It is currently active in Chile, Argentina and Colombia.

== See also ==
- Luis Fernando Intriago Páez
- Sodalitium Christianae Vitae
- Sodalit Family
