= Estollo =

- Municipality
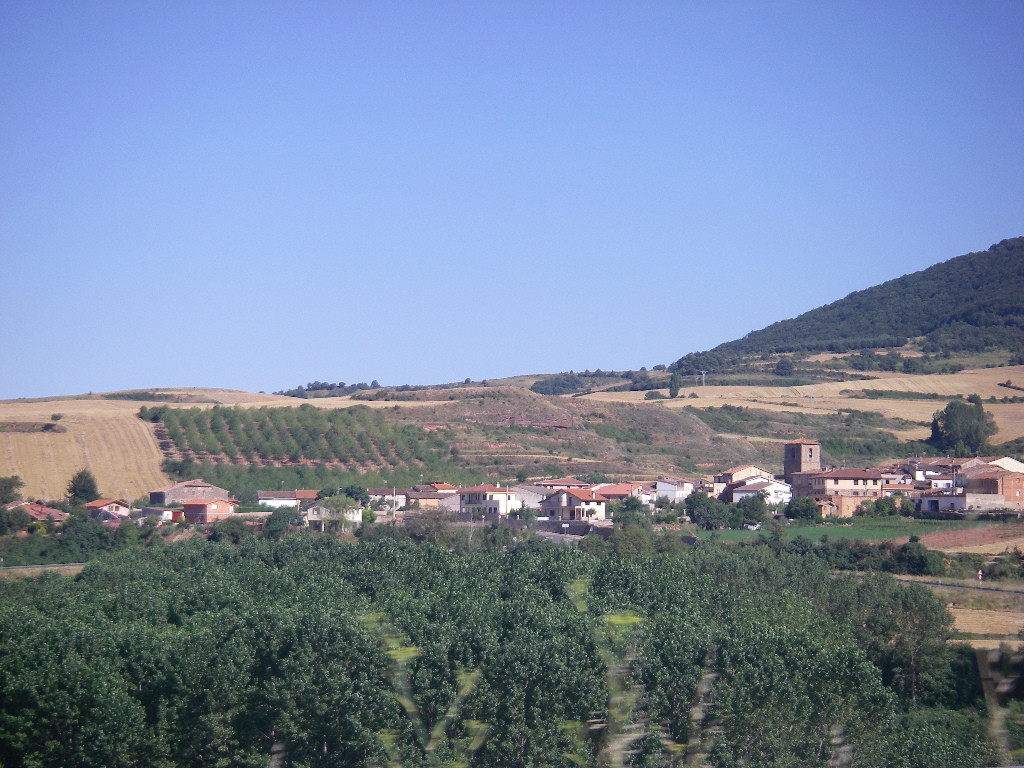
- Skyline of Estollo

- Location within La Rioja, Spain Location within Spain
- Coordinates: 42°19′45″N 2°51′01″W
- Country: Spain
- Autonomous community: La Rioja
- Comarca: Anguiano

Government
  - Mayor: Ángel José Lerena Viniegra (PP)

Area
  - Total: 16.14 km^{2} (6.23 sq mi)
- Elevation: 748 m (2,454 ft)

Population (2025-01-01)
  - Total: 90
- Postal code: 26328

Estollo is a village in the province and autonomous community of La Rioja, Spain. The municipality covers an area of 16.14 square kilometres (6.23 sq mi) and as of 2011 had a population of 104 people.

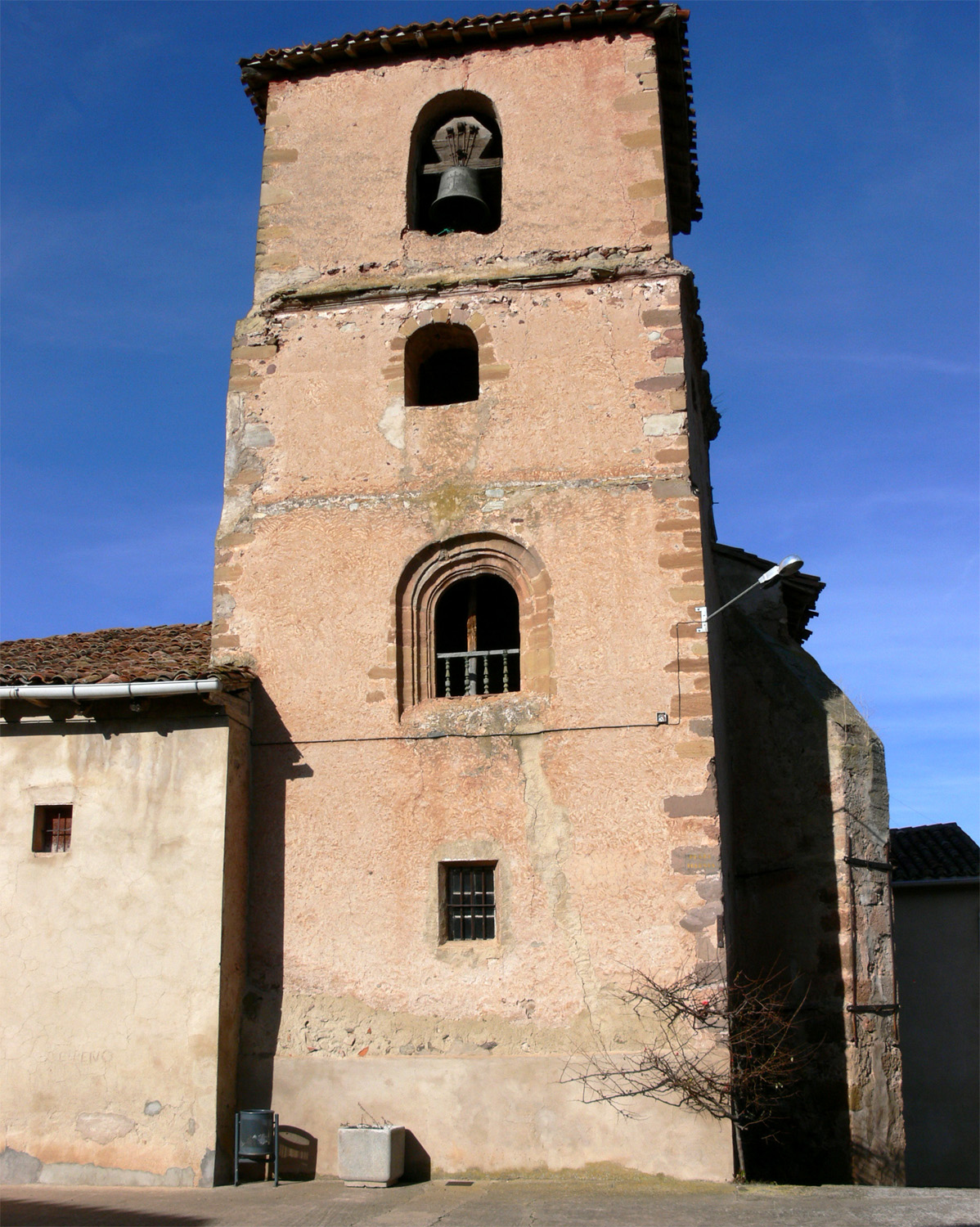
San Andrés Church in San Andrés del Valle, Estollo
