= Archdiocese of Piura =

Roman Catholic archdiocese in Peru

Coordinates: 5.2000°S 80.6333°W

Archdiocese of Piura Archidioecesis Piurensis Arquidiócesis de Piura

Catholic
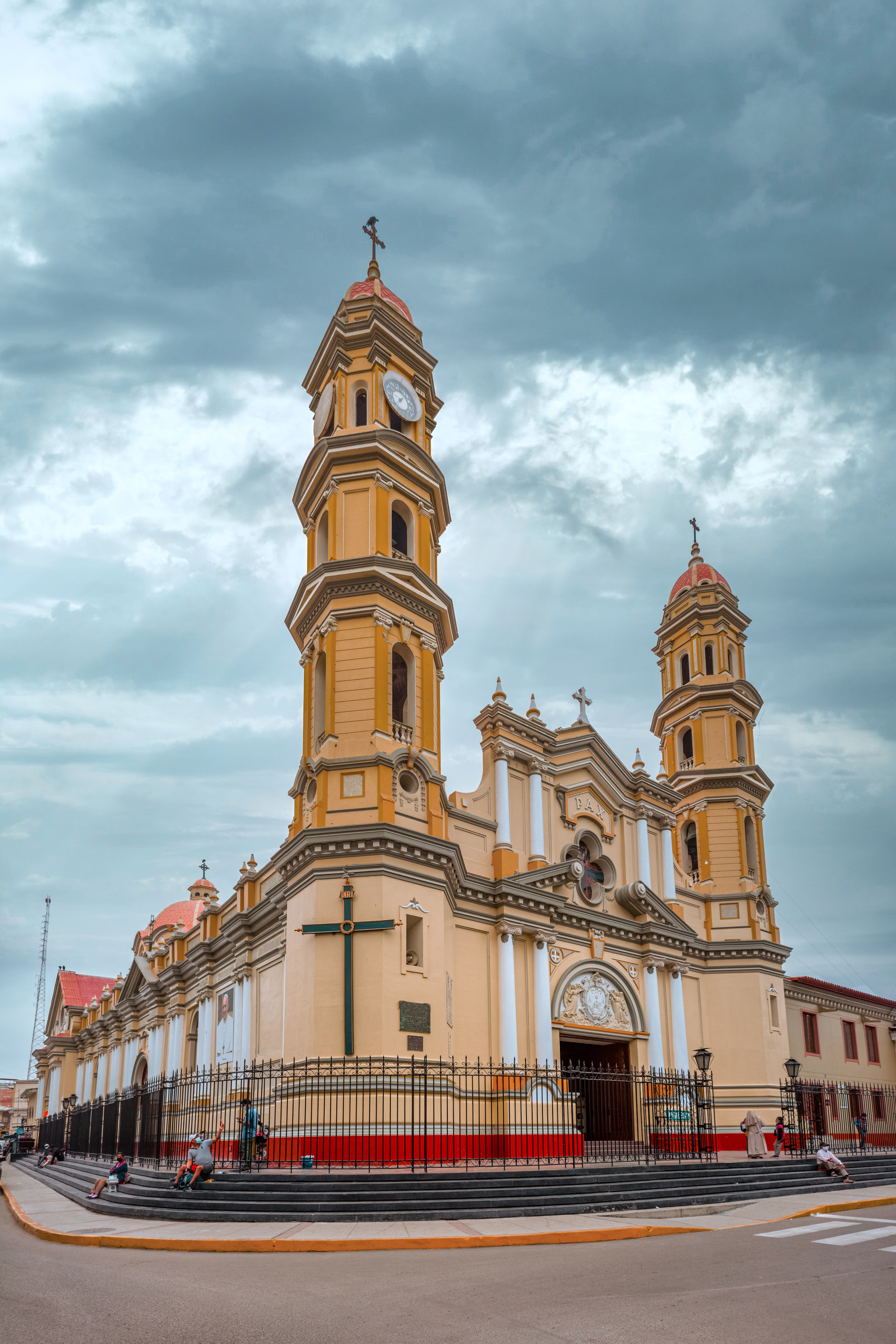
- Cathedral of St. Michael the Archangel

Location
- Country: Peru

Statistics
- Area: 33,510 km^{2} (12,940 sq mi)
- Population: Total; Catholics: (as of 2004); 1,302,551; 1,250,448 (96.0%)

Information
- Denomination: Catholic Church
- Rite: Latin Rite
- Established: 29 February 1940 (86 years ago)
- Cathedral: Catedral de San Miguel Arcángel

Current leadership
- Pope: Leo XIV
- Metropolitan Archbishop: Luciano Maza Huamán

Map

The Roman Catholic Archdiocese of Piura (Latin: Archidioecesis Piurensis; Spanish: Arquidiócesis de Piura) is an archdiocese located in the city of Piura in Peru.

== History ==
- 29 February 1940: Established as Diocese of Piura from the Diocese of Trujillo
- 30 June 1966: Promoted as Metropolitan Archdiocese of Piura
- 8 May 2025: Former Bishop of Chiclayo part of the ecclesiastical province of Piura, Robert Francis Prevost, was elected Pope as Pope Leo XIV

== Bishops ==
=== Ordinaries ===
Ordinaries of Piura
Name	Title	Dates	Notes
Fortunato Chirichigno Pontolido SDB	Bishop	27 January 1941 – 2 January 1953	
Federico Pérez Silva CM	Bishop	2 January 1953 – 15 June 1957	Appointed Archbishop of Trujillo
Carlos Alberto Arce Masías	Bishop	6 February 1959 – 6 January 1963	
Erasmo Hinojosa Hurtado	Bishop	6 January 1963 – 30 June 1966	Later elevated to archbishop
Erasmo Hinojosa Hurtado	Archbishop	30 June 1966 – 6 August 1977	
Fernando Vargas Ruiz de Somocurcio SJ	Archbishop	18 January 1978 – 26 September 1980	Appointed Archbishop of Arequipa
Oscar Rolando Cantuarias Pastor	Archbishop	9 September 1981 – 11 July 2006	
José Antonio Eguren Anselmi SCV	Archbishop	11 July 2006 – 2 April 2024	
Luciano Maza Huamán	Archbishop	12 December 2025 – present	

=== Coadjutor bishops ===
- Federico Pérez Silva CM (1952-1953)
- Erasmo Hinojosa Hurtado (1961-1963)

=== Auxiliary bishops ===
- Federico Richter Fernandez-Prada OFM (1973-1975), appointed Coadjutor Archbishop of Ayacucho o Huamanga
- Emilio Vallebuona Merea SDB (1975-1978), appointed Bishop of Huaraz
- Augusto Beuzeville Ferro (1990-2004)

=== Diocesan priests who became bishops ===
- Jesús Moliné Labarte, appointed Coadjutor Bishop of Chiclayo in 1997

== Suffragan dioceses ==
- Diocese of Chachapoyas
- Diocese of Chiclayo
- Diocese of Chulucanas
- Territorial Prelature of Chota

== See also ==
- Roman Catholicism in Peru

== Sources ==
- GCatholic.org
- Catholic Hierarchy
- Diocese website
