= Luis Fernando Figari =

Peruvian religious leader

Luis Fernando Figari Rodrigo (born 8 July 1947) is a Peruvian Catholic layman who is the founder and former superior general of Sodalitium Christianae Vitae. He also founded the Christian Life Movement and several other religious associations.

He has been the subject of allegations of physical, psychological and sexual abuse of young men, some of whom were minors. On 30 January 2017, following an investigation of these claims, the Congregation for Institutes of Consecrated Life and Societies of Apostolic Life ordered that Figari be "prohibited from contacting, in any way, persons belonging to the Sodalitium Christianae Vitae, and no way have any direct personal contact with them." In August 2024 he was formally expelled from the Sodalitium with the explicit approval of Pope Francis.

== Biography ==
Luis Fernando Figari was born in Lima, Peru, on 8 July 1947. His parents were Alberto (1902–1990) and Blanca Figari (1909–1995), both Peruvian. He was born in a Catholic family, the last of four children. He studied at the Immaculate Heart of Mary School until he was 10 years old and then at Holy Mary High School at Lima. He studied humanities and law at the Pontifical Catholic University of Peru, and then law at the National University of San Marcos in Lima. During this time, he became a leader of the National Confederation of Youth, the youth branch of the Odriíst National Union, the political movement of former president Manuel A. Odría. When he was 19, he was elected to represent the university students from Lima in giving a welcoming speech to US presidential candidate Robert F. Kennedy during his visit to Peru. He began studying theology in the Pontifical and Civil School of Theology of Lima, where he would also teach in 1975.

Between 1967 and 1968, as a secondary educator at the San Isidro school, he founded the Escalones Juveniles Nacionalistas (EJN), a religious and nationalist organization of Falangist ideology and influenced by Jose Antonio Primo de Rivera's thought, which remained active until 1971.

He founded the Sodalitium Christianae Vitae in 1971, a moment he later called the "baptism of a search". Cardinal Juan Landazuri, Archbishop of Lima, began meeting with Figari in 1972 to monitor the development of the Sodalitium and express support. In 1974, Figari founded the Immaculate Mary Association for women. In 1984, Figari participated in the first World Youth Day in Rome. In 1985, he founded the Christian Life Movement (CLM), an ecclesial movement. In 1991, he founded the Marian Community of Reconciliation, a religious association for lay consecrated women. In 1994, CLM was recognized by the Holy See as an international lay association of faithful of pontifical right. In 1995, he founded the Confraternity of Our Lady of Reconciliation. In 1997, Pope John Paul II approved Sodalitium as a society of apostolic life. In 1998, Figari founded another religious association for consecrated women, the Servants of the Plan of God.

In 2002, Pope John Paul II named Figari as consultor to the Pontifical Council for the Laity. In 2005, Pope Benedict XVI named Figari an auditor for the Synod of Bishops on the Eucharist, one of the few lay participants invited to that assembly. On 3 June 2006, Figari addressed the closing words to Pope Benedict XVI in the Encounter of the Ecclesial Movements and New Communities with the Pope at the Vigil of Pentecost in St. Peter's Square.

On 21 December 2010, Figari resigned from his role as Superior General of the Sodalitium Christianae Vitae, citing health reasons.

== Right-wing associations ==
Figari has been known to openly sympathize with Falangism, which has earned a reputation for being Spain's Fascist ideology. In a 2016 interview with The Guardian former Sodalitium member Pedro Salinas accused Figari of admiring fascist figures Adolf Hitler and Benito Mussolini, saying that Figari "admired the oratory of Hitler and Mussolini. He was inspired by Nazi marches and he had a fascination with the Hitler Youth.” Salinas also accused Figari of being the person with the most power in Sodalitium, saying that under Figari's rule, Sodalitium "was an absolutely totalitarian religious organisation in which the power rested in the hands of one person: Luis Fernando Figari.” In an article for El País in October 2024, Archbishop of Lima Carlos Castillo Mattasoglio described Figari's Sodalitium Christianae Vitae as "a failed Cold War experiment" which also "conceals its crimes and its ambition for political and economic dominance." Archbishop Castillo also said that Sodalitium was influenced by fascism, describing Figari's former society as "the resurrection of fascism in Latin America, using the church cunningly, through sectarian methods, testing how strong you are or forcing you to sleep face down on stairs to forge your character."

== Allegations of physical and sexual abuse ==
Some groups are opposed to the Sodalitium, which has generated suspicion and alarm; it is seen by some as a conservative, elitist sect with an authoritarian and fundamentalist structure. In 2003, after parents accused the Sodalitium of brainwashing their son and separating him from them, the movement opened its doors to the press for the first time. Young members were reported as laughing at talk of brainwashing and said that they had been evangelised, not captured, as teenagers.

Pedro Salinas, a former member, said at the time that during his membership in the SCV in the 1980s he was subject to absurd orders. He said that he assumed that "now the Sodalicios have learned from their mistakes and have evolved", but that when he was a member of the movement they had "sectarian characteristics". In a 2015 book, Salinas reported abuse and mistreatment, including sexual abuse, on the part of Figari. Alessandro Moroni Llabrés, the community's current superior general, responded that it was "a cause for deep grief and shame if such acts could have been committed by Luis Fernando Figari ... We condemn the incidents that may have occurred, especially the sexual abuse". Moroni said that the testimonies Salinas reported were plausible and needed to be thoroughly clarified, and that former members of the Movement had reported abuse.

Church authorities were investigating. Allegations submitted to ecclesial tribunals were kept confidential. Figari denied all accusations, but made no public statement, "as would be his moral obligation". The SCV asked for forgiveness, and said they offered victims help. They formed a committee of members and non-SCV experts to meet with any person affected and said they were committed to investigating and clarifying the truth about "the incidents, which are intolerable, because they involve grave suffering for persons who trusted our community, and they betray our deepest values". They said they were available to cooperate with civil and ecclesial authorities.

=== Vatican review ===
In April 2015, the Congregation for Institutes of Consecrated Life and Societies of Apostolic Life appointed Bishop Fortunato Urcey, Prelate of Chota, as apostolic visitor tasked with investigating charges of "improper behavior" on the part of Figari. Urcey's work in Peru was scheduled to last from August 2015 to March 2016. In May 2016, Archbishop Joseph W. Tobin of Indianapolis was named to oversee the reform of Sodalit.

In 2016, Sodalitium of Christian Life leader Alessandro Moroni posted an online video naming Figari as a persona non grata and stating that an internal investigation found he had engaged in sex abuse. Moroni stated that “After the testimonies received, we consider Luis Fernando Figari guilty of the allegations of abuse against him and declare him persona non grata in our organisation as we deplore and wholly condemn his behaviour.” It was also reported that Figari had been living in the Vatican since 2010.

On 30 January 2017, as a result of Urcey's investigation, the Congregation decreed that Figari should have no further contact with members of the Sodalit community. Urcey had reported that while Figari was Superior General he had "adopted a style of government excessively or improperly authoritarian, directed to impose one's own will," and that "in order to obtain the obedience of his brothers [he] used improper strategies and methods of persuasion, that is to say, underhanded, arrogant and nonetheless violent and disrespectful of the right to the inviolability of one's own interiority and discretion".

In February 2017, the institute's superior general turned over to Peru's Office of the Public Prosecutor information identified in a recent report regarding the sexual abuse of minors by its founder and by four of its former members. In January 2017, the Congregation for the Institutes of Consecrated Life and Societies of Apostolic Life prohibited Figari from having any contact with other members of the society. Figari filed appeals twice. With the rejection of both appeals, in February 2019 Superior General of the SCV, José David Correa, formally expelled Figari from the group's community life, and contact with any members.

=== Expulsion of Figari, Vatican findings and dissolution of Sodalitium ===
On August 14, 2024, After more than a year of high-level investigation, the Vatican expelled Luis Fernando Figari for downplaying allegations of sexual and psychological abuse and financial corruption. In September 2024, a Vatican investigation found that 10 high ranking officials in the SCV, including Figari, had engaged in "sadistic" abuses of power, authority and spirituality, including sex abuse. In January 2025, the Sodalitium Christanae Vitae, which Figari had founded, was dissolved by Pope Francis.

In September 2024, it was reported that Figari and other members of Sodalitium Christiane Vitae were found to have sexually abused 19 minors and 17 adults since 1975. There were 30 allegations of abuse by Figari and his closest associates, including Daniel Murguía and Germán Doig.

Despite allegations, findings of a Vatican investigation, and expulsion of many Sodalite authorities, as of October 2024 none of Sodalitium's current or former leaders had been charged with any crimes. Allegations of sexual abuse were not investigated because of a statute of limitations. An investigation was started into Sodalitium as a criminal organization in response to allegations of kidnapping and other crimes, but the investigation was discontinued in October 2024 after nearly eight years.

== Publications ==
Figari has published many articles and books on such subjects as Christian spirituality, the Virgin Mary, the Eucharist, Catholic social teachings, the Catholic view of family, human rights and evangelization of culture. He has strongly backed the ideal of reconciliation, as well as the organization of congresses on several occasions on the issue of reconciliation.

- Un mundo en cambio, Verbo, Lima 1978. (Second edition: Edino, Santiago de Guayaquil 2004. ISBN 9978-21-009-1)
- Huellas de un peregrinar, FE, Lima 1984. (Second edition: FE, Lima 1991. ISBN 9972-41-016-1)
- En compañía de María, FE, Lima 1985. (Fifth edition: Vida y Espiritualidad, Lima 2002. ISBN 9972-600-82-3)
- Aportes para una teología de la reconciliación, FE, Lima 1985. (Second edition: FE, Lima 2000. ISBN 9972-41-010-2)
- Características de una espiritualidad para nuestro tiempo desde América Latina, Vida y Espiritualidad, Lima 1988.
- Dios no ha muerto. Reflexiones en torno a la teología de la muerte de Dios, Vida y Espiritualidad, Lima 1988.
- La Populorum progressio, Vida y Espiritualidad, Lima 1988.
- Por qué una teología de la reconciliación, FE, Lima 1989. (Second edition: Vida y Espiritualidad, Lima 2004. ISBN 9972-600-94-7)
- La enseñanza social de la Iglesia. Camino de reconciliación, Vida y Espiritualidad, Lima 1989.
- Catequesis sobre el amor. Jubileo de los jóvenes. 14 de abril de 1984, FE, Lima 1990.
- El pecado original, niveles de ruptura y reconciliación, FE, Lima 1990.
- La dignidad del hombre y los derechos humanos, FE, Lima 1991.
- Reflexión sobre Medellín. Un largo caminar, Vida y Espiritualidad, Lima 1991. (Second edition: Vida y Espiritualidad, Lima 2008. ISBN 978-9972-212-34-5)
- Peregrinar de una comunidad. Un movimiento joven como respuesta para los jóvenes, Interview by Fr. Harold Griffiths Escardó, FE, Lima 1991.
- Función dinámica de María, FE, Lima 1992.
- Reflexiones en torno a la Trinidad y a la Creación, FE, Lima 1992.
- Con Santa María en América Latina. Reflexiones desde Puebla, FE, Lima 1992.
- María, Paradigma de Unidad, Vida y Espiritualidad, Lima 1992.
- Evangelización, promoción humana y reconciliación en la forja de América Latina, Vida y Espiritualidad, Lima 1992.
- Con María en oración, FE, Lima 1993. ISBN 9972-41-012-9 (English: With Mary in Prayer, Our Sunday Visitor, Huntington (IN) 1999. ISBN 0-87973-691-7)
- El matrimonio, un camino de santidad, Comisión Episcopal de Familia - Vida y Espiritualidad, Lima 1994. ISBN 84-89308-69-1.
- María y la vocación a la vida cristiana, FE, Lima 1995. ISBN 9972-41-001-3.
- Hacia las fuentes de la enseñanza social en la Sagrada Escritura, Vida y Espiritualidad, Lima 1995. ISBN 9972-600-02-5.
- Horizontes de Reconciliación, Vida y Espiritualidad, Lima 1996. ISBN 9972-600-18-1
- Enseñanzas de San José para la Vida Cristiana, FE, Lima 1997. ISBN 9972-41-002-1.
- Federico Ozanam, apóstol de la caridad y la reconciliación, Vida y Espiritualidad, Lima 1998. ISBN 9972-600-41-6
- Lenguaje, homogeneización y globalización, Vida y Espiritualidad, Lima 1998. ISBN 9972-600-49-1.
- Misión reconciliadora de la Iglesia, FE, Lima 1999. ISBN 9972-41-005-6
- Concilio Plenario Latinoamericano. Un centenario, Vida y Espiritualidad, Lima 1999. ISBN 9972-600-60-2
- Páginas de fe, FE, Lima 2000. ISBN 9972-41-009-9
- Luces de Emaús para la vida cristiana, FE, Lima 2000. ISBN 9972-41-008-0
- ¿Nuevos clásicos?, Vida y Espiritualidad, Lima 2000. ISBN 9972-600-69-6
- Una aventura fascinante, FE, Lima 2001. ISBN 9972-41-009-9
- Nostalgia de infinito, FE, Lima 2002. ISBN 9972-41-013-7 (English: Longing for Infinity, Vida y Espiritualidad, Lima 2006. ISBN 9972-212-07-6)
- Vida cristiana y nueva evangelización, FE, Lima 2002. ISBN 9972-41-011-0.
- El modelo de San Jósé ante los desafíos del Tercer Milenio, FE, Lima 2004. ISBN 9972-41-014-5.
- Dolor y alegría. Reflexiones de Viernes Santo, Vida y Espiritualidad, Lima 2005. ISBN 9972-600-98-X
- De la despedida a la bienvenida, FE, Lima 2006. ISBN 9972-41-020-X
- La búsqueda de la verdad, Vida y Espiritualidad, Lima 2006. ISBN 9972-212-09-2
- Caminos de Meditación. Métodos. Tomo I, Vida y Espiritualidad, Lima 2006. ISBN 9972-212-11-4
- Una recta lectura del Concilio en vistas al Tercer Milenio, Vida y Espiritualidad, Lima 2007. ISBN 9972-212-17-3
- Maestría de la palabra y la Pasión, Vida y Espiritualidad, Lima 2008. ISBN 978-9972-212-26-0
- Catequesis al Movimiento de Vida Cristiana en San Juan de Letrán, FE, Lima 2008. ISBN 978-9972-41-021-5
- Formación y misión, VE, Lima 2008. ISBN 978-9972-212-33-8
- Familia, santidad y apostolado, VE, Lima 2009. ISBN 978-9972-212-35-2
- Haced lo que Él os diga, Copihue, Santiago de Chile 2009. ISBN 978-956-8676-05-6
- Oraciones y pensamientos, VE, Lima 2009. ISBN 978-9972-212-38-3
- He ahí a tu Madre, FE, Lima 2010. ISBN 978-9972-41-024-6
- Construyendo el presente y el futuro en horizonte de esperanza, FE, Lima 2010. ISBN 978-9972-41-025-3

== Organisations ==
According to one study:

- Published magazine Tradición y Acción, of the Peruvian branch of the right-wing Catholic group Sociedad de Defensa de la Tradición, Familia y Propiedad, with Pedro Benvenuto y Murrieta and Jorge Cáceres.
- Founded in Lima the phalangist group Escalones Juveniles Nacionalistas.
- Founded with Francisco Tudela the group Tradición y Acción por un Perú Mayor, the Lima branch of Tradición, Familia y Propiedad, which was founded in 1960 in Brazil by Catholic intellectual Plinio Corrêa de Oliveira, variously characterized as ultramontanist, integralist, or fundamentalist and so admired by Figari that he went to Brazil to meet him.
- Founded the group Dios y Patria in about 1973; this gave rise a year later to the Confederación Nacionalista de Juventudes and the Sodalitium Christianae Vitae.
