= Sodalitium Christianae Vitae =

Defunct Roman Catholic society of apostolic life

- Sodalicio de Vida Cristiana
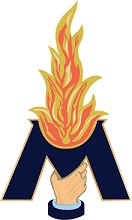
- Flame; Emblem of the Sodalitium Christianae Vitae
- Formation: 8 December 1971
- Founder: Luis Fernando Figari
- Dissolved: 14 April 2025
- Type: Society of Apostolic Life
- Purpose: Evangelization of Culture
- Headquarters: General House, Calle Dos 545, Urb. Monterrico Norte, Lima 41, Peru
- Region served: Worldwide
- Members: 137 laymen and 42 priests (Annuario Pontificio 2025)
- Official language: English, Spanish, Portuguese, Italian
- Leader: Superior General, José David Correa González
- Main organ: General Assembly
- Parent organization: Catholic Church
- Website: Sodalicio de Vida Cristiana (español); Sodalitium Christianae Vitae (inglés); Sodalício de Vida Cristã (portugués)

Sodalitium Christianae Vitae (SCV), or Sodalitium of Christian Life was a Society of Apostolic Life of Pontifical Right, a society of the Catholic Church. It was founded in Lima, Peru, by Luis Fernando Figari on 8 December 1971. It acquired its canonical form when Pope John Paul II gave his Pontifical approval on 8 July 1997. The Sodalitium was the first male religious society in Peru to receive papal approval, and was enormously influential in Peru. By 1997, there were Sodalit communities in several countries. It was dissolved by Pope Francis in 2025 after serious wrongdoing.

The Sodalitium was composed of consecrated laymen and priests, called "Sodalits," who lived in community as brothers and made commitments—not religious vows as such—of celibacy and obedience.

Being recognised as a lay society of apostolic life of pontifical right, the Sodalitium was under the authority of the Congregation for Institutes of Consecrated Life and Societies of Apostolic Life of the Holy See. It was the first lay society of apostolic life to receive pontifical approval.

There were accusations of brainwashing of young people, and of elitism, conservatism, and authoritarianism; and of sexual abuse by founder Luis Fernando Figari and other Sodalites. There were also allegations of right-wing and falangist activism by Figari in his youth. From 2020 there were calls by Church authorities for the Sodalitium to be dissolved due to wrongdoing.

On 14 January 2025, Pope Francis signed the decree suppressing the Sodalitium Christianae Vitae; the Sodalitium expressed deep sorrow and shame for its actions, and requested forgiveness. The decree was formally implemented on 14 April 2025.

== Description ==
The Sodalitium of Christian Life was started in Peru in 1971. It was a society of apostolic life made up of lay people and priests. A society of apostolic life is a group of men or women within the Catholic Church who have come together to live for a specific mission. Their members do not take religious vows, but instead make promises defined in the Code of Canon Law (731-755). Societies of Apostolic Life were introduced by the Church as a response to contemporary culture in 1965 by the decree of the Second Vatican Council, Apostolicam Actuositatem, the Decree on the Apostolate of the Laity. While societies of apostolic life are considered a new organisational type in the Church, the idea has roots that can be traced back to the 16th and 17th centuries with the foundations started by Philip Neri, Charles Borromeo, Pierre de Bérulle, Vincent de Paul, Louise de Marillac, Jean-Jacques Olier, and others. Members of these societies are fully dedicated to the apostolate and life in a fraternal community, with a formal commitment to order their lives to the work of evangelization.

The Sodalitium said there are many different areas of evangelisation, and that three "apostolic accents" are of particular importance: Christian solidarity with those who are in need and marginalized, evangelisation of youth, and evangelisation of culture. The promotion of the family and defense of the life and dignity of humans are other important areas. These, as well as education, are considered means to achieve the vocation regarding culture.

== History ==
=== Beginnings ===
The Sodalitium of Christian Life was founded by Luis Fernando Figari on 8 December 1971. The group was formally consolidated during a ceremonial Mass in Lima, Peru. In 1972, Germán Schmitz, Auxiliary Bishop of Lima, encouraged Sodalitium to develop in the Archdiocese of Lima. Later that same year, the Bishop of the Diocese of Huaraz, Peru, Fernando Vargas Ruiz de Somocurcio, promulgated a "Decree of Praise" that invited the members of Sodalitium to carry out apostolic missions in that diocese.

The Archbishop of Lima and Primate of Peru, Cardinal Juan Landázuri Ricketts, OFM, encouraged the Sodalitium and in 1977 approved their statutes as a private association of the faithful. It was the first step in the ecclesiastical-jurdical process that led the Sodalitium to its current form.

=== Association of the Faithful ===
Together with the first experiences of community life in Lima which began in 1978, the first guidelines were drafted for the fraternal life in common. These brought together different aspects from the Church's tradition of religious communities. In a house in the district of Jesus Maria, small groups of Sodalits began an experiment of fraternal life in common. In 1980, a project which sought to care for sick children also emerged at the Children's Hospital in Lima.

In 1981, the first priest of the Sodalitium, Fr. Jaime Baertl Gomez, was ordained by the Archbishop of Arequipa, Fernando Vargas Ruiz de Somocurcio, SJ.

In early 1984 the Formation Centre, dedicated to Our Lady of Guadalupe, was inaugurated just south of Lima, in the coastal town of San Bartolo, to serve for the first years of initial formation. Also in 1984, Archbishop Fernando Vargas Ruiz de Somocurcio, SJ, invited the Sodalitium to found a community in the southern Peruvian city of Arequipa, the first such community outside of Lima. The same year Figari was invited to the give his "Catechesis on Love", at the first World Youth Day in Rome.

In January 1985 the First International Conference on Reconciliation was organised in the city of Arequipa in order to reflect on Pope John Paul II's Post-Synodal Apostolic Exhortation Reconciliatio et Paenitentia. In the same year the Christian Life Movement was formed. The Life and Spirituality (Vida y Espiritualidad) association also arose, and began publishing a journal, entitled the Revista VE. At the request of the parents, the Sodalitium assumed the administration of the Santa Maria school in the city of Chincha, to the South of Lima in 1985.

In 1986, the Sodalitium founded its first community outside Peru at the invitation of Cardinal Eugenio de Araújo Sales, Archbishop of Rio de Janeiro, Brazil, assuming responsibility for the Our Lady of Guidance (Nossa Senhora da Guia) parish.

In June 1987 in Lima, the first pastoral centre St. Mary of the Evangelisation was opened by the Sodalitium. In Arequipa the Southern Institute (Instituto del Sur) was founded, offering courses for technical careers from a perspective of integral human formation.

With the publication of the new Code of Canon Law in 1983, the Sodalitium sought a clarification of its canonical status. After several consultations with the Archbishop of Lima, Cardinal Juan Landázuri Ricketts, the statutes were amended in 1986. The group remained a private association of the faithful, but with the structure of a Society of Apostolic Life (institutions dedicated to the apostolate, living communally according to their own constitutions). The new statutes were approved in 1989 and the Sodalitium of Christian Life was canonically erected in the Archdiocese of Lima.

=== Society of Apostolic Life by diocesan right ===
The Bishop of Callao, Ricardo Durand Flórez, SJ, invited the Sodalitium to found a community in Lima's neighboring diocese. At the request of the Archbishop of Medellín, Cardinal Alfonso Lopez Trujillo, the Sodalitium arrived in Colombia and assumed responsibility for a parish in 1990. Later that year a second community was founded in Brazil in the city of Petrópolis, where Sodalits began helping in youth apostolate in universities, high school education and other solidarity efforts.

25 March 1991, Figari founded the Marian Community of Reconciliation, an association of women consecrated for apostolic service, who live in community.

In 1992 the Sodalitium founded a community in the Diocese of Santo Amaro, in the city of São Paulo in Brazil. The following year the Christian Life Movement arrived in San José, Costa Rica.

On 22 February 1994, after obtaining the official permission from the Holy See, the Sodalitium was erected as a Society of Apostolic Life of Diocesan Right by the Archbishop of Lima, Cardinal Augusto Vargas Alzamora, SJ. Shortly after the Christian Life Movement was approved as an International Private Association of the Faithful of Pontifical Right on 23 March. In December the Sodalitium held its First Ordinary General Assembly, in which the Guidelines for Fraternal Life (Pautas para la vida fraterna) were presented.

In Lima in 1995 the Mother of the Faith and the Our Lady of the Sea communities were inaugurated. The Fifth International Congress on Reconciliation was also organised.

=== Society of Apostolic Life of Pontifical Right ===
On 8 July 1997, Pope John Paul II approved the Sodalitium of Christian Life as a lay Society of Apostolic Life of Pontifical Right, under the supervision of the Congregation for Institutes of Consecrated Life and Societies of Apostolic Life. A few months later the Sodalit community Our Lady of the Evangelization (Nossa Signora della Evangelizazione) was established in Rome. Near the end of the year the St. Paul Catholic University was founded in Arequipa.

The Sodalitium promoted the participation of the Christian Life Movement in the Encounter of Ecclesial Movements and New Communities, convened by Pope John Paul II during the feast of Pentecost in May 1998. Several members of the Sodalit Family were invited to participate in the World Congress of Ecclesial Movements which took place at that time. On 15 August 1998, Figari founded the Servants of the Plan of God, a group of women consecrated to God; they lived in community and evangelised and promoted solidarity.

In January 1999, the Sodalitium erected the Our Lady of Carmen (Nuestra Señora del Carmen) community in Santiago, Chile. That same year during the First Plenary Assembly of the CLM in Rome, on 6 December, Pope John Paul II spoke to members of the Christian Life Movement and the Sodalitium of Christian Life and invited them to be "artisans of reconciliation in today's world."

The Second Ordinary General Assembly of the Sodalitium of Christian Life was held in the city of Lima in December 2000, in which the founder of the Sodalitium was again elected as superior general. in 2001 the Holy See approved the incardination of Sodalit priests to the Sodalitium, which concluded the juridical process as a society of apostolic life.

In 2002 the Immaculate Heart of Mary community was established in Guayaquil, Ecuador. On 16 February 2002, Pope John Paul II appointed José Antonio Eguren, a Sodalite, an auxiliary bishop of Lima; he received his episcopal consecration on 7 April.

Accepting the invitation of the Archbishop of Denver, Charles Chaput, to administer the Saint Malo's Retreat Center, the Sodalitium founded a community in the US state of Colorado in 2003.

The Sodalitium was also present in Buenos Aires, Argentina, in Bogotá, Colombia, and in San José, Costa Rica. In Santiago, Chile a second Sodalit community was established in 2007, under the name of Mother of the Apostles. In 2009 the Our Lady of the Lake Formation Center was founded in the town of Nemi, near Rome, and was conceived as a home for Sodalits who would study in Roman universities. After the Fifth General Conference of Latin American and Caribbean Bishops in Aparecida, Brazil which was held in 2007, the Sodalitium founded in 2010 the St. Mary of the New Evangelization community in this Marian sanctuary in Brazil.

=== From 2011 ===
At the Extraordinary General Assembly in January 2011 Eduardo Regal Villa, who since 2001 had been Vicar General and General Coordinator of the Christian Life Movement, was elected Superior General. In December 2012, at the Fourth Ordinary General Assembly Sodalit delegates for the assembly elected Alessandro Moroni Llabrés, a Peruvian, who had been superior in Santiago, Chile since 1999.

In 2015 Pedro Salinas, a former member, and journalist Paola Ugaz published a book, Mitad Monjes, Mitad Soldados (Half Monks, Half Soldiers) which reported abuse and mistreatment, including sexual abuse, by Luis Fernando Figari. The movement first published a response which was later considered insufficient, then said that it was "a cause for deep grief and shame if such acts could have been committed by Luis Fernando Figari ... We condemn the incidents that may have occurred, especially the sexual abuse". They said that the testimonies in the book were plausible and needed to be thoroughly clarified, and that former members of the Movement had reported abuse. Ecclesial authorities were investigating.

The SCJ created a committee of members and non-SCJ experts to meet with any person affected, and said they were committed to thoroughly investigating and clarifying the truth about "the incidents, which are intolerable, because they involve grave suffering for persons who trusted our community, and they betray our deepest values". They said they were available to cooperate with civil and ecclesial authorities. There were thirty allegations of abuse by Fernando Figari and his closest associates, including Daniel Murguía and Germán Doig. Salinas's book also details Fernando Figari's involvement in his youth with extreme right-wing, and phalangist groups.

In April 2016, Sodalitium leader Alessandro Moroni posted an online video where he claimed that the organization had conducted an investigation which resulted in a conclusion that Figari was guilty of sex abuse and that he was also now in a state of persona non grata. Moroni stated that "After the testimonies received, we consider Luis Fernando Figari guilty of the allegations of abuse against him and declare him persona non grata in our organisation as we deplore and wholly condemn his behaviour."

In February 2017 the institute's Superior General turned over to Peru's Office of the Public Prosecutor information identified in the committee's recent report regarding the sexual abuse of minors by its founder and by four of its former members.

=== Vatican oversight ===
In April 2015, the Congregation for Institutes of Consecrated Life and Societies of Apostolic Life appointed Bishop Fortunato Urcey, Prelate of Chota, as apostolic visitor tasked with investigating charges of "improper behavior" on the part of Figari. His work in Peru was scheduled to last from August 2015 to March 2016. In May 2016, Archbishop Joseph W. Tobin of Indianapolis (later Cardinal Archbishop of Newark) was named to oversee the reform of Sodalit. On 30 January 2017, as a result of Urcey's investigation, the Congregation decreed that Figari should have no further contact with members of the Sodalit community. Urcey had reported that while Figari was Superior General he had "adopted a style of government excessively or improperly authoritarian, directed to impose one's own will," and that "in order to obtain the obedience of his brothers [he] used improper strategies and methods of persuasion, that is to say, underhanded, arrogant and nonetheless violent and disrespectful of the right to the inviolability of one's own interiority and discretion".

In January 2017, the Congregation for the Institutes of Consecrated Life and Societies of Apostolic Life prohibited Figari from having any contact with other members of the society. Figari filed appeals twice; both were rejected.

In January 2018, the Congregation for Institutes of Consecrated Life and Societies of Apostolic Life appointed Redemptorist Bishop Noel Londoño Antonio Buitrago of Jericó, Colombia, as Apostolic Commissary to oversee the SCV.

=== Expulsion of founder and other figures ===
In July 2023, Maltese Archbishop Charles Scicluna and Monsignor Jordi Bertomeu, acting on orders from Pope Francis, began an audit investigation against the Sodalitium Christiane Vitae.

On 14 August 2024 the Peruvian Conference of Catholic Bishops announced that Pope Francis had expelled Sodalitium Christianae Vitae founder Luis Fernando Figari after it had been determined that he had engaged in sex abuse and financial corruption.

On 25 September 2024 the Conference announced that Pope Francis had expelled a bishop, two priests and seven laymen from the Sodalitium who had been accused of a variety of crimes including physical abuse with "sadism and violence", abuse of conscience, spiritual abuse, the abuse of power and authority, and covering up crimes, and abuse of "the apostolate of journalism".

On 21 October 2024, four more Sodalitium members were expelled. Former Sodalitium vicar general and Figari's assistant José Andrés Ambrozic Velezmoro (former superior of the Denver house), and Fr. Luis Ferrogiaro Dentone were expelled, accused of abuse and financial corruption. On 23 October a priest and a layman from the society, Fr. Jaime Baertl Gómez and Juan Carlos Len, who had been found guilty of canonical faults and sins related to financial malpractice and abuse, were expelled.

=== Neglect of sex abuse reports by Archbishop of Lima ===
Former Archbishop of Lima Cardinal Juan Luis Cipriani Thorne has been criticized for ignoring reports he received of sex abuse by the Sodalitium. During Cirpiani's time as Archbishop, the allegations against Sodalitium were first made public in a series of articles in 2000 in the magazine Gente by former Sodalitium member José Enrique Escardó, with the first formal accusations being presented to the church in 2011. Cipriani was slow to take action, with the sex abuse case against the Sodalitium not even moving forward until journalists Pedro Salinas and Paola Ugaz exposed the practices of Sodalitium in their 2015 book "Half Monks, Half Soldiers." Speaking to the Associated Press on 25 January 2025, Escardó said that "Cardinal Cipriani was the Opus Dei cardinal that Sodalitium needed." Ugaz faced sustained harassment for her work; in November 2022 she asked Pope Francis for protection for herself and three other journalists. He received them personally and expressed his support. A play, Poyecto Ugaz, about Ugaz's work was performed in June 2025; Francis's successor as pope, Leo XIV, acknowledged the harms caused by the Sodalitium, and issued a statement saying that it was necessary to inculcate "throughout the church a culture of prevention that does not tolerate any form of abuse: abuse of power or authority, of conscience or spirituality, of sexual abuse", and saying that defending free and ethical journalism is "an act of justice [and] a duty for all who aspire to a strong and participatory democracy".

=== Dissolution ===
Pope Francis dissolved the Sodalitium of Christian Life on 20 January 2025, after an investigation found that there had been sexual and spiritual abuses and financial mismanagement. Victims want the assets of the Sodalitium to be used as compensation for their trauma, but at the time of dissolution it was not known how the assets would be used, which was to be decided by the Holy See. Sodalitium whistleblower José Enrique Escardó was also acknowledged to have met with Pope Francis on 24 January 2025, with the pope accepting the need to keep victims front and center as the Vatican dismantles the group and tends to its members. The decree of dissolution was formally implemented on 14 April 2025.

==== Apology and reparations ====
On 21 January 2025 the Sodalitium's General Assembly, gathered at Aparecida, Brasil, released a Reparations Report covering their work between May 2016 and December 2024. They expressed deep sorrow and shame and requested forgiveness. The report stated that US$5.35 million in reparations had been paid in that period as financial compensation, therapeutic assistance and academic support to 83 people identified as victims of sexual abuse, physical abuse, abuse or misuse of authority, and breaches of the Sodalitium's internal code of conduct.

== Governance ==
The Sodalitium Christianae Vitae was ruled by the constitutions approved by the Holy See, a structure quite similar to other societies of consecrated life approved by the Holy See. The General Assembly was the highest authority in the Sodalitium; its decisions were binding for all members. The Sodalitium was governed by a Superior General who served for a term of six years. In January 2019 José David Correa González was chosen by the Vatican Congregation for the Institutes of Consecrated Life and Societies of Apostolic Life during the general assembly. Together with the Superior General, the other members that made up the Superior Council were the Vicar General, and five General Assistants who were responsible for the five areas of Spirituality, Instruction, Apostolate, Communications, and Temporal Goods. Each was also elected at the General Assembly for the same period of time.

== Apostolic work ==
The members of the Sodalitium participated in the evangelizing mission of the Church, seeking particularly to influence young and poor people. Other areas of apostolate were carried out, especially regarding the family, the defence of life and education. The SCV was concerned with what they call "solidarity with the poor", which includes apostolic work around the world to meet this concern.

=== Parishes ===
Parishes were entrusted to the Sodalitium in the archdiocese of Lima, Peru; the diocese of Chosica, Peru; and the archdiocese of Medellin, Colombia; the Archdiocese of Rio de Janeiro, Brazil; A group of brothers worked at St. Agatha-St. James Parish in Philadelphia, United States. The Sodalitium was reported to be enormously influential in Peru.

=== Solidarity on the March and charitable work ===
Solidaridad en Marcha (Solidarity on the March) was a social programme and charity branch of the SCV. Its stated goals were human development and poverty eradication. Through third-party support, Solidaridad en Marcha ran social projects in health care, education, and community development. Their work also included urban infrastructure development, the construction of water systems, transportation systems, community kitchens, parks and playgrounds, schools, day-care and community centres, chapels, and medical clinics. They also conducted a number of campaigns throughout the year that focused on assisting the poor and evangelisation.

=== Apostolate with youth ===
Apostolic work with young people took place in different areas, such as in universities, schools, youth organisations and groups of formation, especially in the Christian Life Movement, offering conferences, missions, talks, courses, spiritual accompaniment, and retreats.

Sodalits sought to evangelise the new generations of young people into their faith, especially on World Youth Days. Since 1977, the Sodalitium and the Christian Life Movement sponsored an International Youth Congress called Convivio, for Catholic youth who came to it from around the world for a weekend. In 2010, Convivio Congresses were held in Australia, Brazil, Chile, Colombia, Costa Rica, Ecuador, England, Peru, Angola, the Philippines and the United States, in a total of 16 cities. Tens of thousands of young people attended these Congresses.

From 2014, "brothers" from SCV headed the Newman Center at the University of Pennsylvania.

=== Evangelization of culture ===
"Culture" was understood by the Sodalitium as the sphere in which human beings are educated and come to know themselves, in which values are formed, in which truth, goodness, and beauty are recognised and appreciated. It was a fundamental area of apostolate for the Sodalitium. The Sodalitium's stated aims included investigating and developing thought and reflection to improve people's cultural conditions. Some members of the Sodalitium and its spiritual family carried out development, research and teaching at various levels, in many different areas of culture and the professional world.

=== Family and defence of life ===
According to Figari the Sodalitium emphasised the family, and considered marriage as a way of holiness and the first line of evangelization, and as teacher of the faith, as well as respect for personal liberty and life.

== Branches ==
The Sodalitium had several branches said to represent and promote different spiritual expressions:

- The Christian Life Movement is an international ecclesial lay Movement that was open to people of all ages. It was approved by the Holy See in 1994. With more than 40,000 members it was by far the biggest branch of the Sodalit Spiritual Family.
- The Marian Community of Reconciliation, also known as the "Fraternas", erected as a Society of Apostolic Life of diocesan right in the Archdiocese of Lima in 2011.
- The Servants of the Plan of God was a canonical society of consecrated women who wear a habit.

== Ordinations to episcopacy ==
Two SCV members were ordained bishops: Archbishop José Antonio Eguren of Piura, and Bishop Kay Schmalhausen of the Prelature of Ayaviri. Both dioceses are in Peru.

== Spirituality ==
The views of the Sodalitium on spirituality were as follows.

Along with the common spirituality of the Catholic Church, the Sodalitium had its own spirituality ("the Sodalit spirituality"), discipline and style, which the members considered to be suitable means to live one's conversion and mission within the Church. The spirituality of the Sodalitium was influenced by Blessed William Joseph Chaminade (1761-1850), St. Ignatius of Loyola (1491-1556), several Fathers of the Church, several authors of the Benedictine and Cistercian school – among them St. Bernard of Clairvaux (1090-1153) – as well as by the French school of spirituality, including Cardinal Pierre de Berulle (1575-1629). as well as by some spiritual authors of the Spanish Catholic Reformation, including Cardinal Abbot Francisco Jiménez de Cisneros (1455-1510), Fray Luis de Granada (1504-1588) and St. John of Ávila (1500-1569).

"Integral life of faith" was the foundation of the Christian life. The Sodalitium's members read, study, and pray, especially meditating on the Sacred Scriptures. Its tenets included:

- The centrality of the Trinitarian Mystery
- The recognition of the Incarnation as the central event of human history, in which Jesus the Reconciler restored fallen humanity.
- Filial love to Mary, as a way of relating with her son, Jesus, and of growth in the Christian life. As the mother of Jesus, Mary is seen as the spiritual mother for Sodalits, which is expressed in their motto: "Through Christ to Mary and through Mary more fully to the Lord Jesus."
- Community life, whereby the human being finds fulfilment in communion with others. In community, those who live the Sodalit spirituality are meant to have faith which they share and celebrate, living like a family in the same way as the disciples of Jesus gathered around Mary. Members of the Sodalitium and its spiritual family come together as friends with the same belief, to share the life of faith, where each person should be for the others a motivation of fervour, humility, prayer, reverence, joy, work, ministry and solidarity.
- The effort to live a spirituality of everyday life, making of one's own person and actions a "worship pleasing to God", living the evangelical virtues, fulfilling duties according to one's condition and position, and using one's personal gifts in order to fulfill what are considered God's plans.
- Embracing the gift of the sacrament of reconciliation in order to live one's own conversion in order to say with the Apostle Paul: "It is not I who live, but Christ who lives in me." Through reconciliation it is believed that the change of the human heart (the basis for all social change) is attained.
- Ecclesiality expressed in obedience to the magisterium of the Church and the Pope, in the participation in the life of the Church and the disposition of service for its evangelising mission, seeking to spread the Gospel.

According to the Sodalitium, the spirituality of the Sodalitium was known as the Sodalit spirituality, which conformed to what is known in Church tradition as a spiritual family. A spiritual family refers to a large group of people who live their relationship with God from a particular perspective always in communion with the long tradition of the Church. The spiritual family of the Sodalitium was known as the Sodalit Family, which comprised various associations, projects and people.

== Formation ==
Formation for the consecrated life and priesthood had several stages. While these vary from community to community in name, length of time, and format, the following outline gives a general view of formation programmes that were held.

Aspirant

The aspirant to membership will have questions like "What does God want of me?" The aspirant has meetings and participates in certain activities while continuing their education or work. A person may be an aspirant for between one and three years.

Candidate

A more formal relationship with the community occurs when a person becomes a candidate, and must discern whether the consecrated life is the right choice. At this stage candidates live with the community. This period enables the person involved to observe and participate in religious life from inside the community, and lets the community decide whether the candidate is suitable. This stage lasts two years.

Trainee

This next stage of formation is called in some religious societies the novitiate, a one- to two-year period which marks the person's official entrance into the community. Trainees spend time in study and prayer, learning more about themselves, the community, spirituality and their religious relationship. Special periods of learning in practice are established to help make an assessment of the trainee's readiness and consistency. These periods are established with special attention to the trainee's requirements and to the convenience of change in environment in the formation process.

Marian Consecration

At the end of the main formative years, the Marian Consecration prepares the person for temporary promises, or vows.

Temporal commitment

The person explicitly makes vows of obedience, celibacy, communication of goods and all other norms contained in the Constitutions approved by the Holy See. The temporal profession is renewed yearly and may last up to nine years. Final vows can be made after three years of temporary promises.

Perpetual commitment

After these stages the person makes promises of obedience and celibacy perpetually in the Society, becoming a full member. A man preparing for the priesthood also has seminary training, where his time is spent studying theology, the Bible, the teachings of the Church, and the skills he will need to be a priest.

== Criticism ==
The order founded by Luis Fernando Figari, Sodalitium Christianae Vitae was considered, by its members, to be orthodox in its fidelity to the Catholic Church and its magisterium, and was supported by various Catholic bishops.

Some groups were opposed to the Sodalitium, which generated suspicion and alarm; it was seen by some as a conservative, elitist group with an authoritarian and fundamentalist structure. After parents accused the Sodalitium of brainwashing their son and separating him from his parents, the movement opened its doors to the press for the first time in 2003. Young members were reported as laughing at talk of brainwashing, and said that they had been evangelised, not captured, as teenagers.

In 2003 there were accusations of brainwashing of young people, and of elitism, conservatism, and authoritarianism. There were also detailed allegations about the founder's extreme right-wing and falangist activism in his youth.

In October 2024, Carlos Castillo Mattasoglio, the Archbishop of Lima, called for the Sodalitium to be suppressed, describing the group as having "concealed its crimes and its ambition for political and economic dominance", and also "the resurrection" of fascist influence in Latin America.

=== Sexual and physical abuse ===
A report in 2017 supported accusations of past sexual abuse by the SCV founder Luis Fernando Figari and by other Sodalites; the SCV apologised for these transgressions. Independent investigators commissioned by the Sodalitium reported that "Figari sexually assaulted at least one child, manipulated, sexually abused, or harmed several other young people; and physically or psychologically abused dozens of others." It was also reported that Figari committed physical abuse, being described as "appearing to enjoy observing the younger aspirants and brothers experience pain, discomfort and fear." On one occasion, he burned an individual with a candle, and menaced members by allowing his dog to bite them at times. The report also mentions that there are several other Sodalits who had physically or psychologically abused another Sodalit or a person in formation. These people are still in the community, though they have had "administrative actions taken against them and are receiving training."

In March 2016 Alessandro Moroni Llabres, Superior General of the Sodalitium Christianae Vitae (SCV) and the Superior Council of the SCV requested that reports be prepared on abuses perpetrated by Figari and Sodalites, and responses of the SCV. Over 200 people were interviewed, and many documents examined. The reports concluded that Luis Fernando Figari and former Sodalites, none of whom (except Figari) remained attached to the SCV, committed sexual abuse on minors and adults, with the last abuse on an adult in the year 2000. Llabres asked for forgiveness from those hurt.

On 30 January 2017, the Vatican's Congregation for Institutes of Consecrated Life and Societies of Apostolic Life ordered that Figari be "prohibited from contacting, in any way, persons belonging to the Sodalitium Christianae Vitae, and no way have any direct personal contact with them."

On 10 January 2018, it was announced that Pope Francis had appointed Bishop Noel Londoño Buitrago of the Diocese of Jericó, Colombia as papal commissioner. He will work alongside the papal delegate, Cardinal Joseph W. Tobin of the Diocese of Newark. Pope Francis said that a verdict would be reached within a month, and was likely to be unfavourable to Figari. Tobin had found instances of sexual and psychological abuse, and financial irregularities.

Pedro Salinas, a former member, said at the time that during his membership to the SCV in the 1980s he was subject to absurd orders, and assumed that "now the Sodalicios have learned from their mistakes and have evolved", but that when he was a member of the movement they had "sectarian characteristics".

In 2018 Archbishop Eguren sued two journalists for defamation after they reported on forced evictions in Eguren's diocese by a real estate developer linked to the Sodalitium. He was criticised for this even from within the Peruvian church, and dropped the lawsuit the following year.

On 10 March 2019 Cardinal Pedro Barreto said that he and other bishops in Peru had asked the Vatican to dissolve the Sodalitium Christianae Vitae, commenting "Personally, I think that when a religious organization has committed a crime, because it has to be said that way—from the point of view of sexual abuse and the economic side where there are also problems—it has to be dissolved. The fundamental problem is that the founder ... is a perverted person, and such a person cannot transmit the holiness of life." Prosecutors in Peru at the time were believed to be considering criminal charges relating to acts of abuse in the Sodalitium. As of April 2024 the Church had not decided whether to dissolve or reform the Sodalitium, although there was speculation in 2022 that it might be dissolved.

In 2023 the Vatican began a new investigation of the Sodalitium, this time investigating alleged abuse and financial wrongdoing. As of April 2024 the resulting report had not been released. On 2 April 2024, Pope Francis accepted Eguren's resignation as archbishop, about eight year's earlier than Eguren would normally retire. One of the journalists whom Eguren had sued after he reported wrongdoing suggested that this was directly related to the investigation, and that other action could follow.

=== Fascist influence ===
Historically, Sodalitium Christiane Vitae founder Luis Fernando Figari was known to openly sympathize with Falangism, which is known for being Spain's fascist ideology. According to former Sodalitium member Pedro Salinas, Figari also "admired the oratory of Hitler and Mussolini. He was inspired by Nazi marches and he had a fascination with the Hitler Youth." On October 19, 2024, in an article for El País, Archbishop of Lima Carlos Castillo Mattasoglio called for the suppression of Sodalitium, describing the order as "a failed Cold War experiment" which is also "the resurrection of fascism in Latin America, using the church cunningly, through sectarian methods, testing how strong you are or forcing you to sleep face down on stairs to forge your character."

=== Governance ===
Speaking to The Guardian in 2016, Pedro Salinas stated that under Figari's rule, the Sodalitium Christiane Vitae was an "absolutely totalitarian religious organisation" which only answered to Figari. According to Salinas, " the power rested in the hands of one person: Luis Fernando Figari.”

== See also ==
- Religious institute (Catholic)
- Secular institute
