= Territorial Prelature of Chota =

Roman Catholic territorial prelature in Peru

Territorial Prelature of Chota Praelatura Territorialis Chotensis

Catholic

Location
- Country: Peru
- Metropolitan: Piura

Statistics
- Area: 6,823 km^{2} (2,634 sq mi)
- Population: Total; Catholics: (as of 2004); 338,000; 216,000 (93.5%)

Information
- Rite: Latin Rite

Current leadership
- Bishop: Víctor Emiliano Villegas Suclupe, O.A.R.

The Territorial Prelature of Chota (Latin: Praelatura Territorialis Chotensis) is a Roman Catholic territorial prelature, an administrative division not within a diocese, located in the city of Chota in the ecclesiastical province of Piura in Peru.

== History ==
- 7 April 1963: Established as Territorial Prelature of Chota

== Ordinaries ==
Prelates of Chota (Roman rite)

- Bishop Florentino Armas Lerena, O.A.R. (April 7, 1963 – August 17, 1976)
- Bishop José Arana Berruete, O.A.R. (January 24, 1979 – October 27, 1992)
- Bishop Emiliano Antonio Cisneros Martínez, O.A.R. (December 7, 1993 – March 27, 2002), appointed Bishop of Chachapoyas
- Bishop José Carmelo Martínez Lázaro, O.A.R. (March 27, 2002 – October 12, 2004), appointed Bishop of Cajamarca
- Bishop Fortunato Urcey, O.A.R. (October 15, 2005 – July 2, 2022)
- Bishop Víctor Emiliano Villegas Suclupe, O.A.R. (July 2, 2022 – present)
