= Walter Brandmüller =

German Catholic cardinal

His Eminence Walter Brandmüller
- Cardinal-Priest 'pro hac vice' of San Giuliano dei Fiamminghi
- Church: Catholic Church
- Appointed: 20 November 2010 (as Cardinal-Deacon); 3 May 2021 (as Cardinal-Priest)
- Installed: 6 March 2011
- Predecessor: Jan Pieter Schotte
- Previous posts: President of the Pontifical Committee for Historical Sciences (1998-2009); Titular Archbishop of Caesarea in Mauretania (2010)

Orders
- Ordination: 26 July 1953 by Joseph Otto Kolb
- Consecration: 13 November 2010 by Raffaele Farina
- Created cardinal: 20 November 2010 by Pope Benedict XVI
- Rank: Cardinal-Deacon (2010-21); Cardinal-Priest (2021-)

Personal details
- Born: Walter Brandmüller; 5 January 1929 (age 97) Ansbach, Germany
- Denomination: Catholic (Latin Church)
- Education: LMU Munich
- Motto: Ignem in Terram ("(To cast) fire upon the Earth")
- Coat of arms

Styles of Walter Brandmüller
- Reference style: His Eminence
- Spoken style: Your Eminence
- Informal style: Cardinal

Walter Brandmüller (born 5 January 1929) is a German prelate of the Catholic Church, a cardinal since 2010. He was president of the Pontifical Committee for Historical Sciences from 1998 to 2009.

== Early life ==
Brandmüller was born in 1929 in Ansbach, Germany. His father was Catholic and his mother was Protestant. Brandmüller was baptized as a Protestant and converted to Catholicism from Lutheranism in his adolescence. He studied at LMU Munich in 1963, he earned a doctorate in history (doctoral thesis: "Das Wiedererstehen katholischer Gemeinden in den Fürstentümern Ansbach und Bayreuth", 'The reestablishment of Catholic parishes in the principalities of Ansbach and Bayreuth'); and he obtained the "habilitation" in 1967 with the dissertation "Das Konzil von Pavia-Siena (1423–1424)" ('The council of Pavia-Siena').

== Priest and academic ==
On 26 July 1953, he was ordained a priest in Bamberg by Joseph Otto Kolb, Archbishop of Bamberg. He did pastoral work in the church of Saint John, Kronach, 1953–1957, and in that of Saint Martin, Bamberg, 1957–1960. Thereafter, he did further studies in Munich. He served as Professor of Church History and Patrology at the University of Dillingen from 30 October 1969 until 1971. From 7 October 1970 until his retirement in 1997 he was Professor of Modern and Medieval Church History at the University of Augsburg. From 1971 until 1998, he was parish priest of the Assumption, Walleshausen, Diocese of Augsburg.

A specialist in the history of the councils, he is founder and editor of the journal Annuarium conciliorum historiae (Paderborn, 1969); and of the series "Konziliengeschichte" (1979), which has published 37 volumes so far. He also published the "Handbook of Bavarian Church History" (St. Ottilie, 1991–1999, 3 vols. in 4). From 1981 to 1998, he was a member of the Pontifical Committee for Historical Sciences. He was appointed Honorary Prelate on 17 July 1983. On 22 July 1990, he received the Cross of the Order of Merit of the Federal Republic of Germany from president Richard von Weizsäcker. He served as President of the International Commission for Contemporary Church History from 1998 until 2006. He has been a canon of the chapter of the Saint Peter's Basilica since 1997. From 13 June 1998 until 3 December 2009, he was President of the Pontifical Committee for Historical Sciences.

== Cardinal ==
On 20 November 2010, Pope Benedict XVI elevated Brandmüller to the College of Cardinals as Cardinal-Deacon of the titular see of S. Giuliano dei Fiamminghi. Before being made a cardinal, as is required by canon law, he received episcopal consecration on 13 November from Cardinal Raffaele Farina, Archivist and Librarian of the Holy Roman Church, assisted by Ludwig Schick, Archbishop of Bamberg, and curial archbishop Giuseppe De Andrea.

=== Submission of dubia to Pope Francis ===
In September 2016, Brandmüller, along with Cardinals Carlo Caffarra, Raymond Burke and Joachim Meisner, submitted to Pope Francis a private letter with five dubia (questions) seeking clarification on various points of doctrine in the Pope's apostolic exhortation Amoris laetitia. The first dubium concerned the reception of the sacraments by the divorced and remarried; the other four asked about fundamental issues of the Christian life, and referenced Pope John Paul II's encyclical Veritatis splendor. In November 2016, having not received a response, they publicised their letter, entitled "Seeking Clarity: A Plea to Untie the Knots in Amoris Laetitia".

Six months later, on 6 May 2017, Caffarra, Brandmüller, Burke and Meisner delivered to the pope a private letter asking for an audience, given they had not received a response to the dubia sent in September 2016. The following month, having received no response to this new request, they made this new correspondence public. Two of the four cardinal authors would die later that year: Meisner on 5 July and Caffara on 6 September.

In February 2019, Brandmüller and Burke penned an open letter addressed to Pope Francis calling for an end of "the plague of the homosexual agenda", which they blamed for the sexual abuse crisis engulfing the Catholic Church. They claimed the agenda was spread by "organized networks" protected by a "conspiracy of silence".

After ten years at the rank of cardinal deacon, Brandmüller exercised his option to request elevation to the rank of cardinal priest, an automatic change to which long-serving members of the college are entitled. Pope Francis confirmed this new rank on 3 May 2021.

In August 2023, Brandmüller, then 94, along with Cardinals Burke, Íñiguez, Sarah, and Zen, submitted another list of five dubia to Pope Francis, this time primarily concerning the forthcoming Synod on Synodality. The dubia questioned the necessity of the upcoming synod, asked whether the blessing of same-sex unions was theologically admissible, questioned the evolving teaching on women's role in the church, and questioned certain papal teachings re forgiveness and its sacrament.

== Select published works ==
- Das Konzil von Konstanz 1414–1418. 2 vol. Schöningh, Paderborn:
  - Band 1: Bis zur Abreise Sigismunds nach Narbonne, 1991, 2. extended Ed. 1999, ISBN 3-506-74698-7.
  - Band 2: Bis zum Konzilsende, 1998, ISBN 3-506-74691-X.
- Das Konzil von Pavia-Siena 1423–1424. Schöningh, Paderborn 2002, ISBN 3-506-74675-8.
- Briefe um das I. Vaticanum. Aus der Korrespondenz des Konzilssekretärs Bischof Fessler von St. Pölten 1869–1872. Schöningh, Paderborn 2005, ISBN 3-506-71359-0.
- "Unity and Indissolubility of Marriage: From the Middle Ages to the Council of Trent", in: Robert Dodaro (Ed.), Remaining in the Truth of Christ: Marriage and Communion in the Catholic Church, Ignatius Press, San Franzisco 2014. S. 129–147. German Edition: Robert Dorado (Ed.), In der Wahrheit Christi bleiben. Ehe und Kommunion in der Katholischen Kirche, Echter, Würzburg 2014, ISBN 978-3-429-03783-3. (Contents and editorial of the original online available, in the editorial the abstract of the essay from Brandmüller p. 15–24). The anthology is a reply to Walter Kasper, Das Evangelium von der Familie. Die Rede vor dem Konsistorium, Verlag Herder Freiburg, Basel, Wien 2014, ISBN 978-3-451-31245-8.
- "Renuntiatio Papae - einige historisch-kanonistische Überlegungen", in: Johannes Grohe, Gregor Wurst, Zvjezdan Strika, Hermann Fischer (eds.), Begegnung der Kirche in Ost und West im Spiegel der synodalen Strukturen. Historisch-theologische Beiträge (= Festschrift Petar Vrankić zum 70. Geburtstag), EOS Verlag Erzabtei St. Ottilien, Sankt Ottilien 2017, ISBN 978-3-8306-7869-4, pp. 65–80.

Catholic Church titles
Preceded by Victor Saxer	President of the Pontifical Committee of Historical Sciences; 13 June 1998 – 3 December 2009	Succeeded by Bernard Ardura
Preceded by Stanislaus Tobias Magombo	Titular Archbishop of Cesarea in Mauretania; 4 November 2010 – 20 November 2010	Succeeded by Marek Solczyński
Preceded by Jan Pieter Schotte	Cardinal-Deacon of San Giuliano dei Fiamminghi; 20 November 2010 – 2021	Succeeded by Himself (as Cardinal-Priest)
Preceded by Himself (as Cardinal-Deacon)	Cardinal-Priest of San Giuliano dei Fiamminghi; 20 November 2021 – Present	Incumbent
