= William Kent =

English architect and designer (c. 1685–1748)

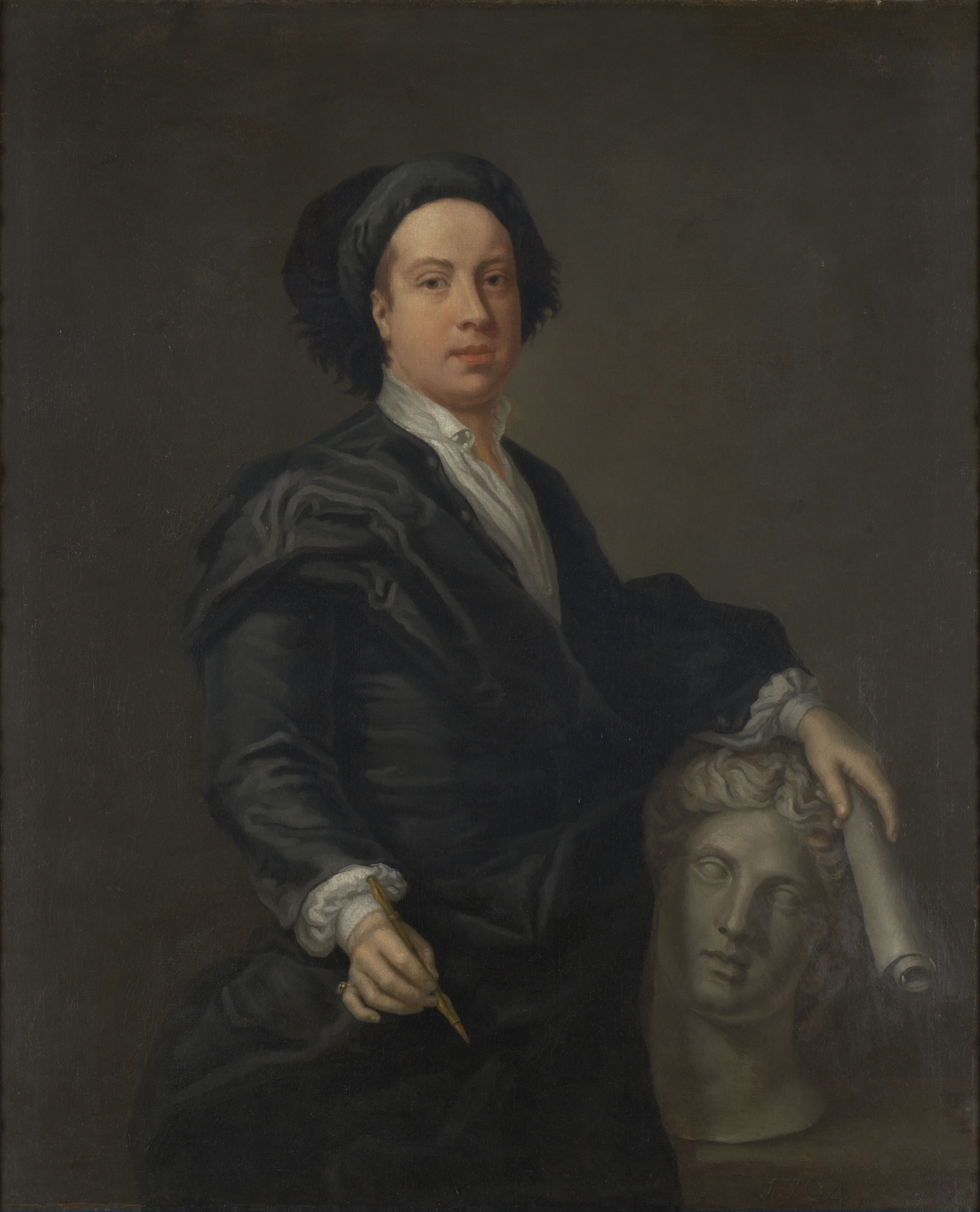
- Portrait by William Aikman, c. 1710–1720
- Born: late 1685; Bridlington, East Riding of Yorkshire, England
- Died: 12 April 1748 (aged 62); Burlington House, London, England
- Occupation: Architect
- Buildings: Holkham Hall; Chiswick House; 44 Berkeley Square; Badminton House; Stowe House
- Projects: Palladian style English landscape garden

William Kent (c. 1685 – 12 April 1748) was an English architect, landscape architect, painter and furniture designer of the early 18th century. He began his career as a painter, and became Principal Painter in Ordinary or court painter, but his real talent was for design in various media.

Kent introduced the Palladian style of architecture into England with the villa at Chiswick House, and also originated the 'natural' style of gardening known as the English landscape garden at Chiswick, Stowe Gardens in Buckinghamshire, and Rousham House in Oxfordshire. As a landscape gardener he revolutionised the layout of estates, but had limited knowledge of horticulture.

He complemented his houses and gardens with stately furniture for major buildings including Hampton Court Palace, Chiswick House, Devonshire House and Rousham. He is credited with designing the first baby carriage on wheels.

== Early life ==
Kent was born in Bridlington, East Riding of Yorkshire, and baptised on 1 January 1686, as William Cant. His parents were William and Esther Cant (née Shimmings).

Kent's career began as a sign and coach painter, and he was encouraged to study art, design and architecture by his employer. A group of Yorkshire gentlemen sent Kent for a period of study in Rome, and he set sail on 22 July 1709 from Deal, Kent, arriving at Livorno on 15 October. By 18 November he was in Florence, staying there until April 1710 before finally setting off for Rome. In 1713 he was awarded the second medal in the second class for painting in the annual competition run by the Accademia di San Luca for his painting of A Miracle of S. Andrea Avellino.

He also met several important figures including Thomas Coke, later 1st Earl of Leicester, with whom he toured Northern Italy in the summer of 1714 (a tour that led Kent to an appreciation of the architectural style of Andrea Palladio's palaces in Vicenza), and Cardinal Pietro Ottoboni in Rome, for whom he apparently painted some pictures, though no records survive. During his stay in Rome, he painted the ceiling of the church of San Giuliano dei Fiamminghi (Church of St. Julian of the Flemings) with the Apotheosis of St. Julian. The most significant meeting was between Kent and Richard Boyle, 3rd Earl of Burlington.

Kent left Rome for the last time in the autumn of 1719, met Lord Burlington briefly at Genoa, Kent journeying on to Paris, where Lord Burlington later joined him for the final journey back to England before the end of the year. As a painter, he displaced Sir James Thornhill in decorating the new staterooms at Kensington Palace, London; for Burlington, he helped to decorate Chiswick House, especially the painted ceilings, and Burlington House.

== Architectural works ==
Kent started practising as an architect relatively late in life, in the 1730s. He is remembered as an architect of the revived Palladian style in England. Burlington gave him the task of editing The Designs of Inigo Jones... with some additional designs in the Palladian/Jonesian taste by Burlington and Kent, which appeared in 1727. As he rose through the royal architectural establishment, the Board of Works, Kent applied this style to several public buildings in London, for which Burlington's patronage secured him the commissions: the Royal Mews at Charing Cross (1731–33, demolished in 1830), the Treasury buildings in Whitehall (1733–37), and the Horse Guards building in Whitehall (designed shortly before his death and built 1750–1759). These neo-antique buildings were inspired as much by the architecture of Raphael and Giulio Romano as by Palladio.

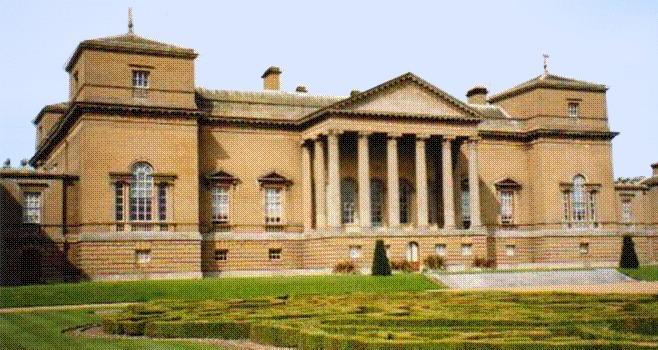
Holkham Hall, in Norfolk, England

In country house building, major commissions for Kent were designing the interiors of Houghton Hall, Norfolk (c.1725–35), recently built by Colen Campbell for Sir Robert Walpole, but at Holkham Hall (also in Norfolk) the most complete embodiment of Palladian ideals is still to be found; there Kent collaborated with Thomas Coke, the other "architect earl", and had for an assistant Matthew Brettingham, whose own architecture would carry Palladian ideals into the next generation. Walpole's son Horace described Kent as below mediocrity as a painter, a restorer of science as an architect and the father of modern gardening and inventor of an art.

A theatrically Baroque staircase and parade rooms in London, at 44 Berkeley Square, are also notable. Kent's domed pavilions were erected at Badminton House (Gloucestershire) and at Euston Hall (Suffolk).

Kent could provide sympathetic Gothic designs, free of serious antiquarian tendencies, when the context called; he worked on the Gothic screens in Westminster Hall and Gloucester Cathedral.

He worked on the house at 22 Arlington Street in St. James's, a district of the City of Westminster in central London from 1743, when it was commissioned by the newly elevated Prime Minister, Henry Pelham. After Kent's death, the work was completed by his assistant Stephen Wright.

== Landscape architect ==
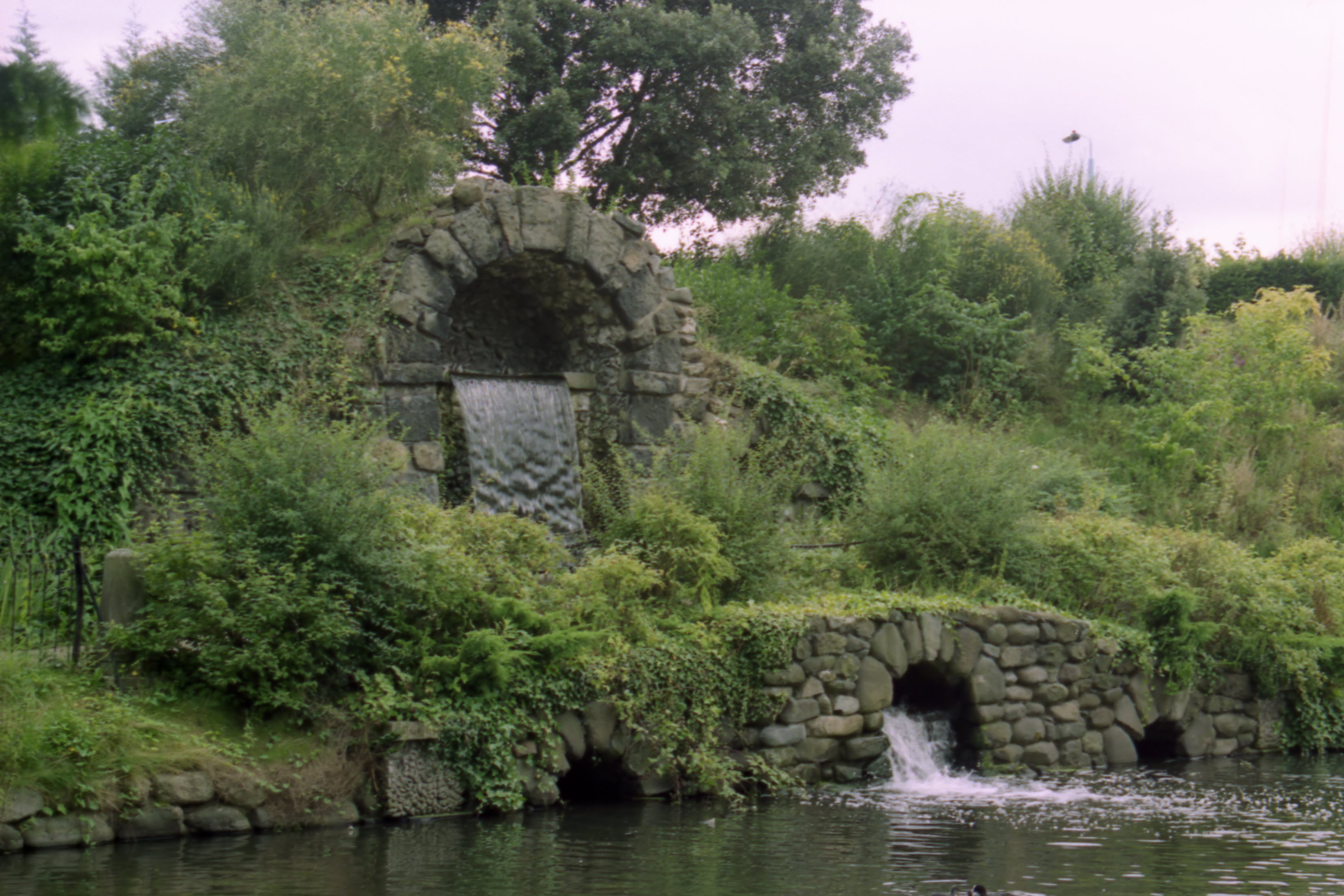
Cascade in gardens of Chiswick House

As a landscape designer, Kent was one of the originators of the English landscape garden, a style of "natural" gardening that revolutionised the laying out of gardens and estates. His projects included Chiswick House, Stowe, Buckinghamshire, from about 1730 onwards, designs for Alexander Pope's villa garden at Twickenham, for Queen Caroline at Richmond, and notably at Rousham House, Oxfordshire, where he created a sequence of Arcadian set-pieces punctuated with temples, cascades, grottoes, Palladian bridges and exedra, opening the field for the larger scale achievements of Capability Brown in the following generation. Smaller Kent works can be found at Shotover Park, Oxfordshire, including a faux Gothic eyecatcher and a domed pavilion. His all-but-lost gardens at Claremont, Surrey, have recently been restored. It is said that he was not above planting dead trees to create the mood he required.

Kent's only downfall was said to be his lack of horticultural knowledge and technical skill (compared to those such as Charles Bridgeman, whose impact on Kent is often underestimated). Nevertheless, his naturalistic style of design was his major contribution to the history of landscape design. Claremont, Stowe, and Rousham are places where their joint efforts can be viewed. Stowe and Rousham are Kent's most famous works. At the latter, Kent elaborated on Bridgeman's 1720s design for the property, adding walls and arches to catch the viewer's eye. At Stowe, Kent used his Italian experience, particularly with the Palladian Bridge. At both sites Kent incorporated his naturalistic approach.

== Furniture designer ==
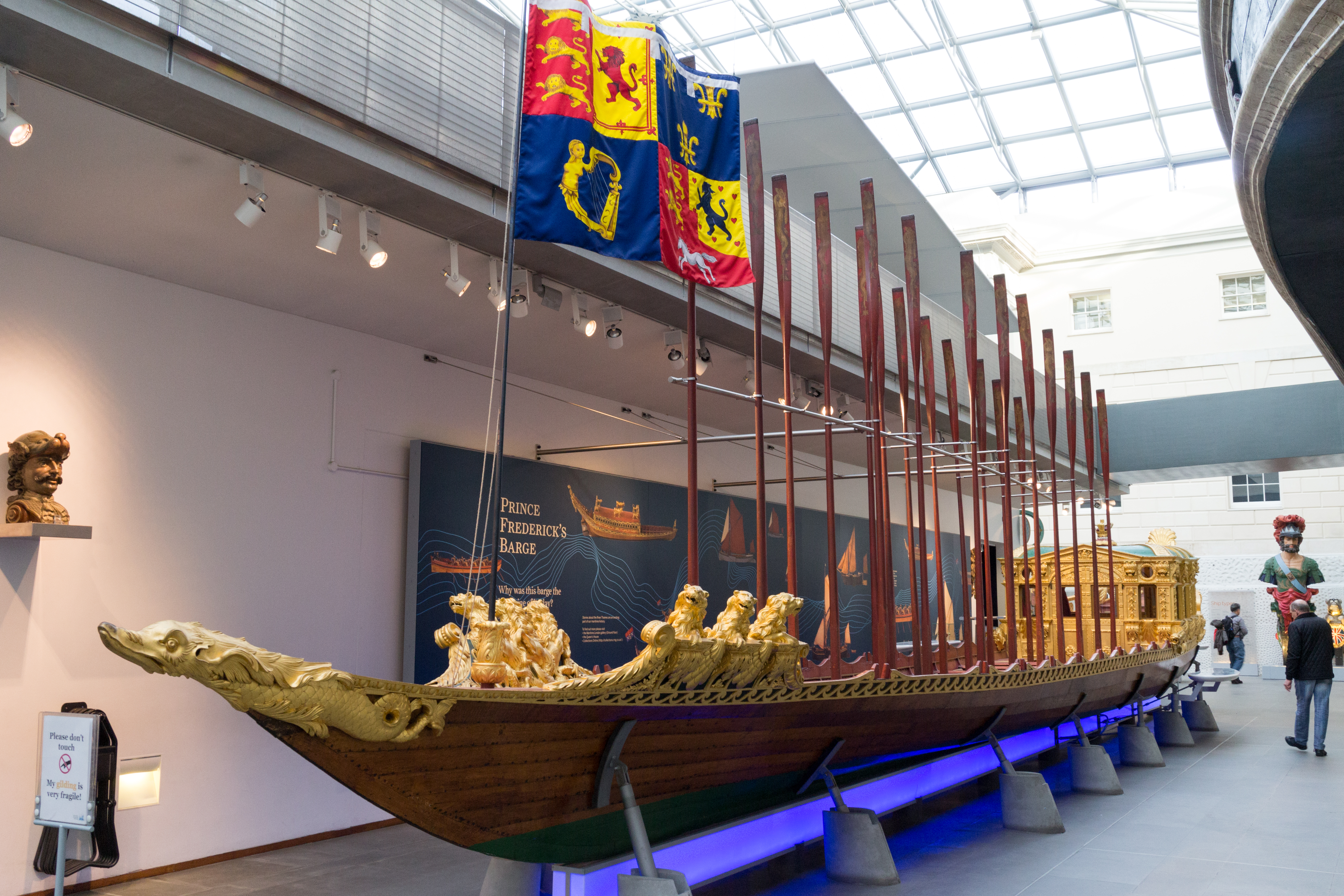
Prince Frederick's Barge

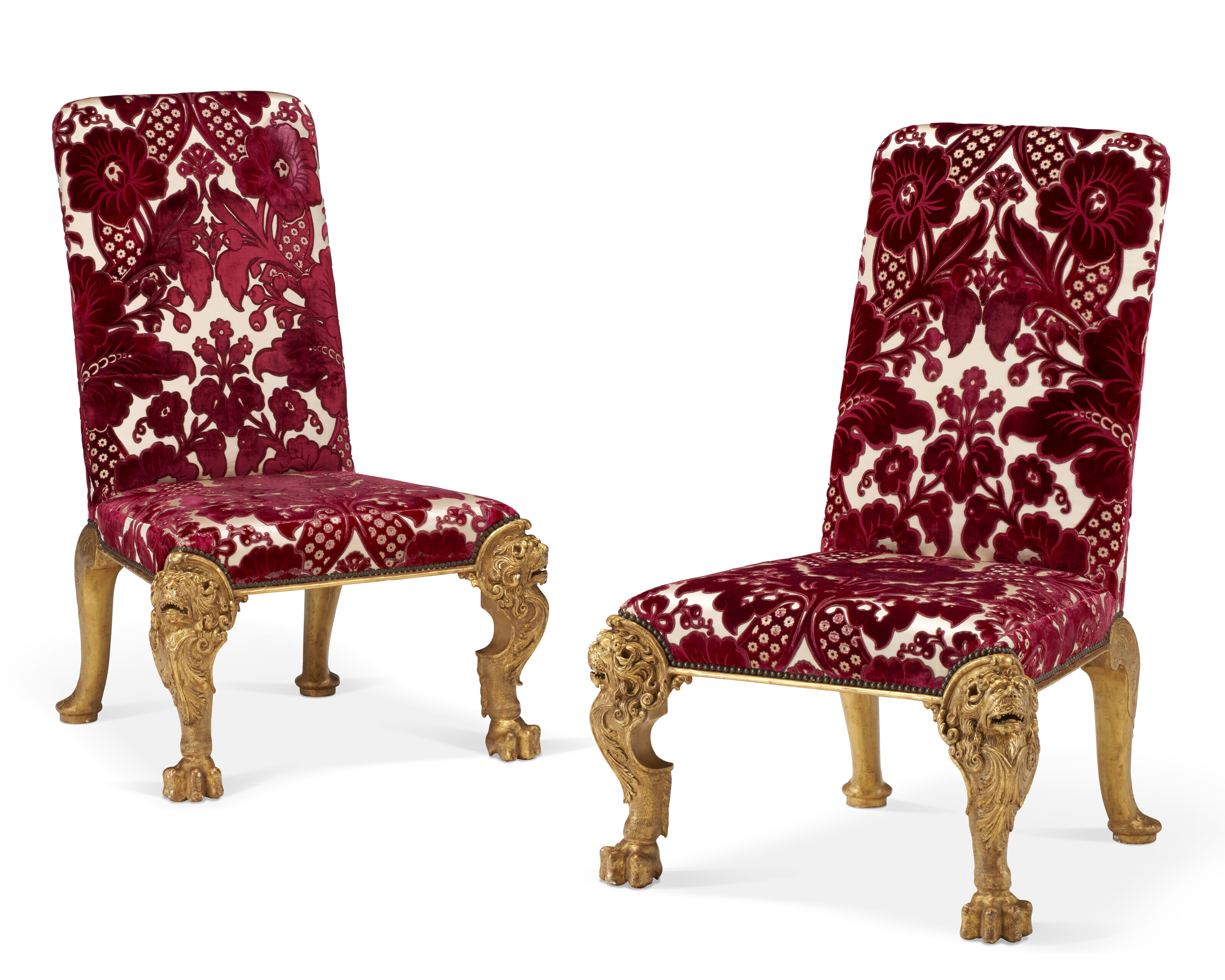
The Ditchley Park Chairs

His stately furniture designs complemented his interiors: he designed furnishings for Hampton Court Palace (1732), Lord Burlington's Chiswick House (1729), London, Thomas Coke's Holkham Hall, Norfolk, Robert Walpole's pile at Houghton Hall, for Devonshire House in London, and at Rousham and George Henry Lee I, 2nd Earl of Lichfield‘s Ditchley Park. The royal barge he designed for Frederick, Prince of Wales can be seen at the National Maritime Museum, Greenwich.

In his own age, Kent's fame and popularity were so great that he was employed to give designs for all things, even for ladies' birthday dresses, of which he could know nothing and which he decorated with the five classical orders of architecture. These and other absurdities drew upon him the satire of William Hogarth who, in October 1725, produced a Burlesque on Kent's Altarpiece at St. Clement Danes.

In 1733, he was commissioned by William Cavendish, 3rd Duke of Devonshire to design the first baby carriage with wheels. It was ornately decorated and was pulled by a goat or a small pony.

== Walpole tribute ==
According to Horace Walpole, Kent "was a painter, an architect, and the father of modern gardening. In the first character he was below mediocrity; in the second, he was a restorer of the science; in the last, an original, and the inventor of an art that realizes painting and improves nature. Mahomet imagined an Elysium, Kent created many."

== List of works ==
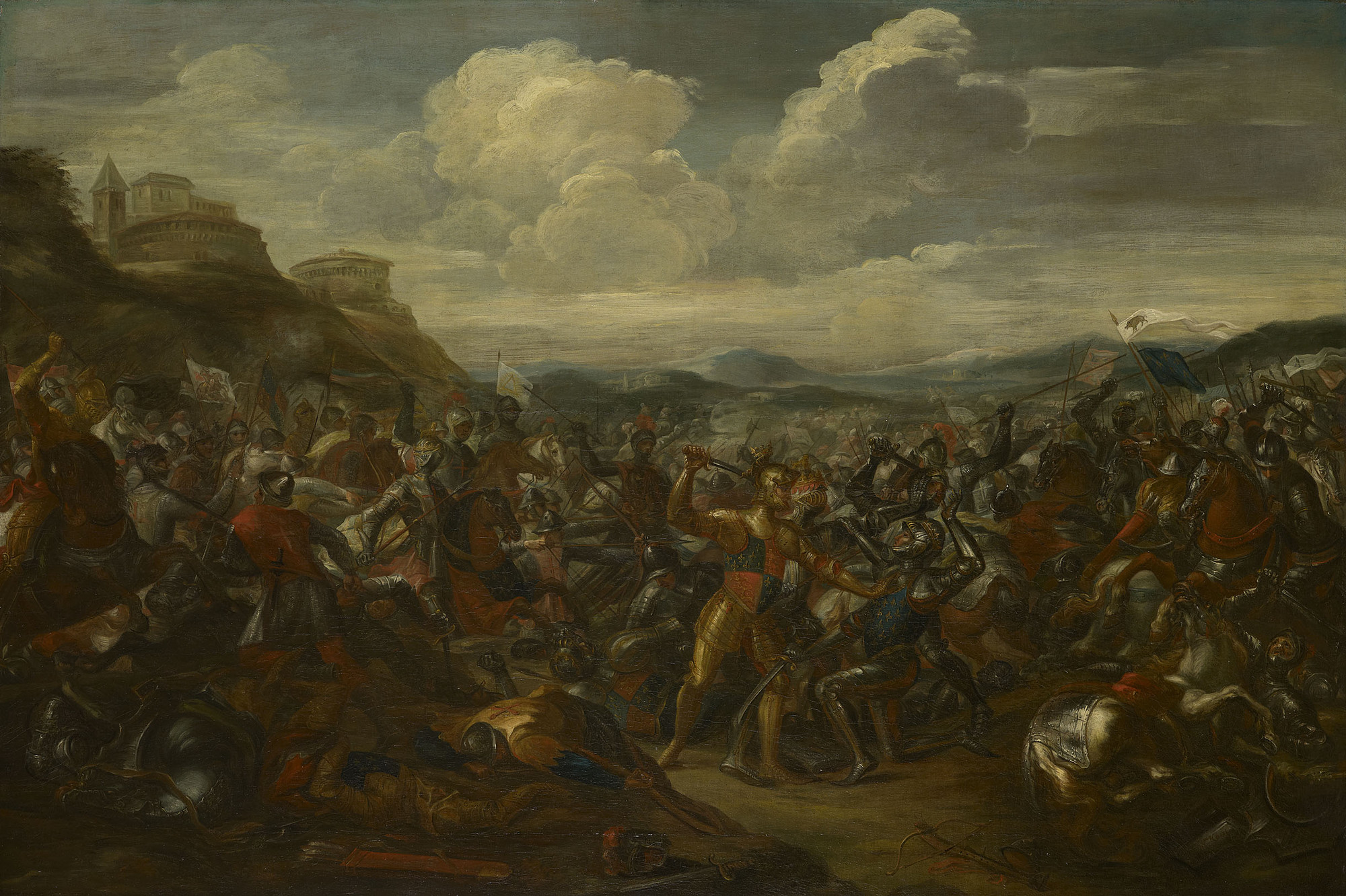
The Battle of Agincourt, 1729. Painted by Kent for Queen Caroline at Kensington Palace

=== Domestic work ===
- Kensington Palace, fresco on grand staircase
- Wanstead House (designed by Colen Campbell), interior decoration (1721–24)
- Burlington House, London, interior decoration (c.1727)
- Chiswick House, London, interiors and furniture (c.1726–29)
- Houghton Hall, interiors and furniture (c.1726–31) & stables (c.1733-5)
- Ditchley, Oxfordshire (designed by James Gibbs), interiors (c.1726)
- Sherborne House, Gloucestershire, furniture designs (1728)
- Stowe House, interiors and garden buildings (c.1730 to 1748)
- Alexander Pope's Villa, designs for garden buildings (c.1730) demolished
- Richmond Gardens, garden buildings 1730–35, demolished
- Stanwick Park (ascribed), remodelled and interiors (c.1730–40)
- Raynham Hall, interiors and furniture (c.1731)
- Kew House (1731–35), demolished 1802
- Esher Place, the wings (c.1733), demolished
- Shotover House, Obelisk, Octagonal & Gothic temples (1733)
- Holkham Hall, with Earl of Burlington & Earl of Leicester executed by Matthew Brettingham (1734–1765)
- Devonshire House including furniture (1734–35), demolished 1924–5
- Easton Neston, designed fireplaces (1735)
- Aske Hall (ascribed), Gothic temple (1735)
- Claremont Garden, garden buildings (1738), only the domed temple on the island in the lake survives
- Rousham House, addition of wings and landscaping of the gardens & garden buildings (1738–41)
- Badminton House, remodelling of the north front, interiors (c.1746–1748)
- Worcester Lodge at Badminton House, including interior plasterwork (1746)
- 22 Arlington Street, London (1741–50), completed after Kent's death by Stephen Wright
- 44 Berkeley Square, London (1742–44)
- 16 St. James Place, London early (1740s) demolished 1899–1900
- Oatlands Palace, garden building (c.1745), demolished
- Euston Hall, Suffolk (1746)
- Wakefield Lodge, Northamptonshire (c.1748–50)
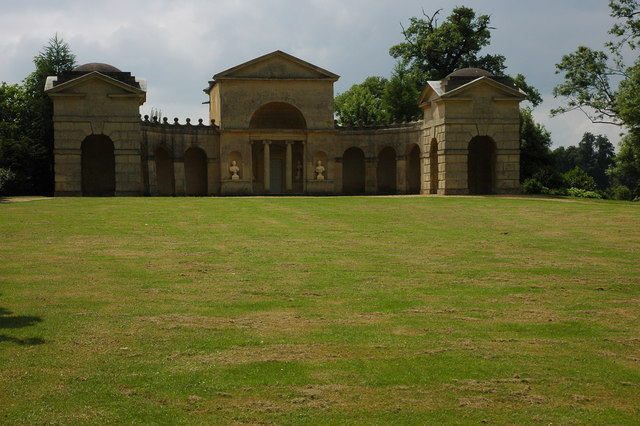
Temple of Venus, Stowe

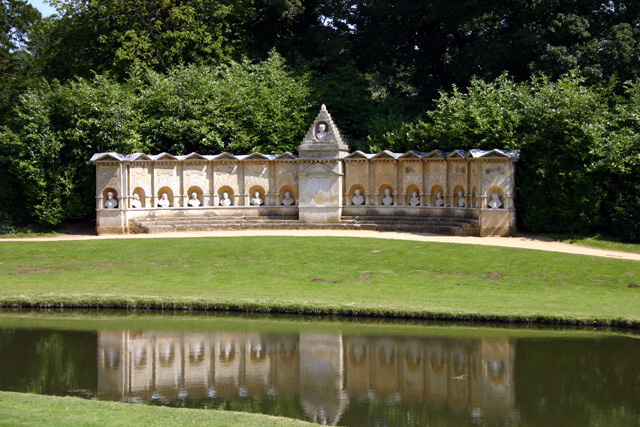
Temple of British Worthies, Stowe

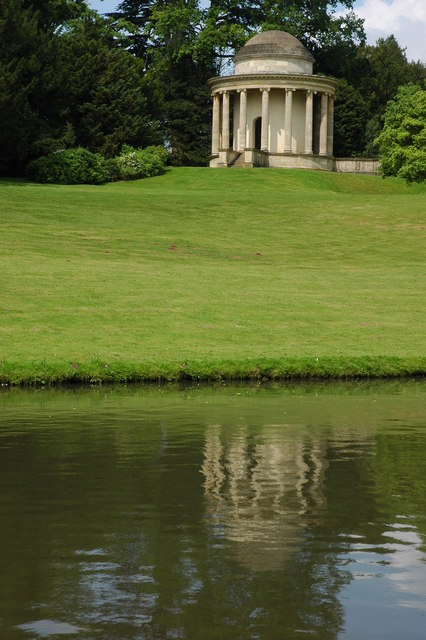
The Temple of Ancient Virtue, Stowe

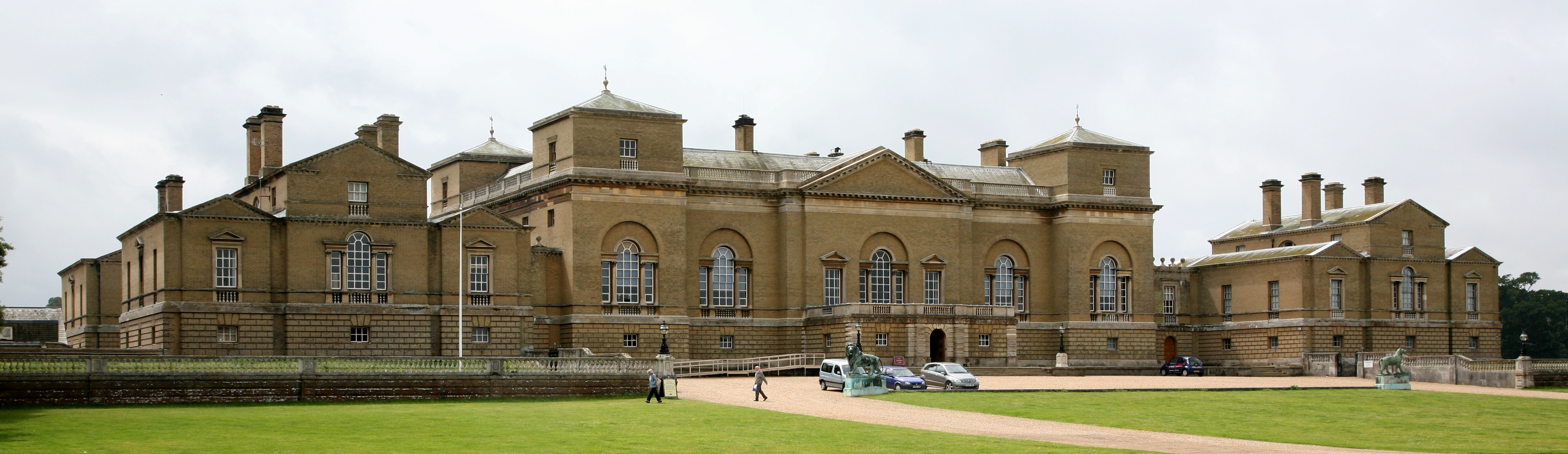
Holkham Hall, North Front

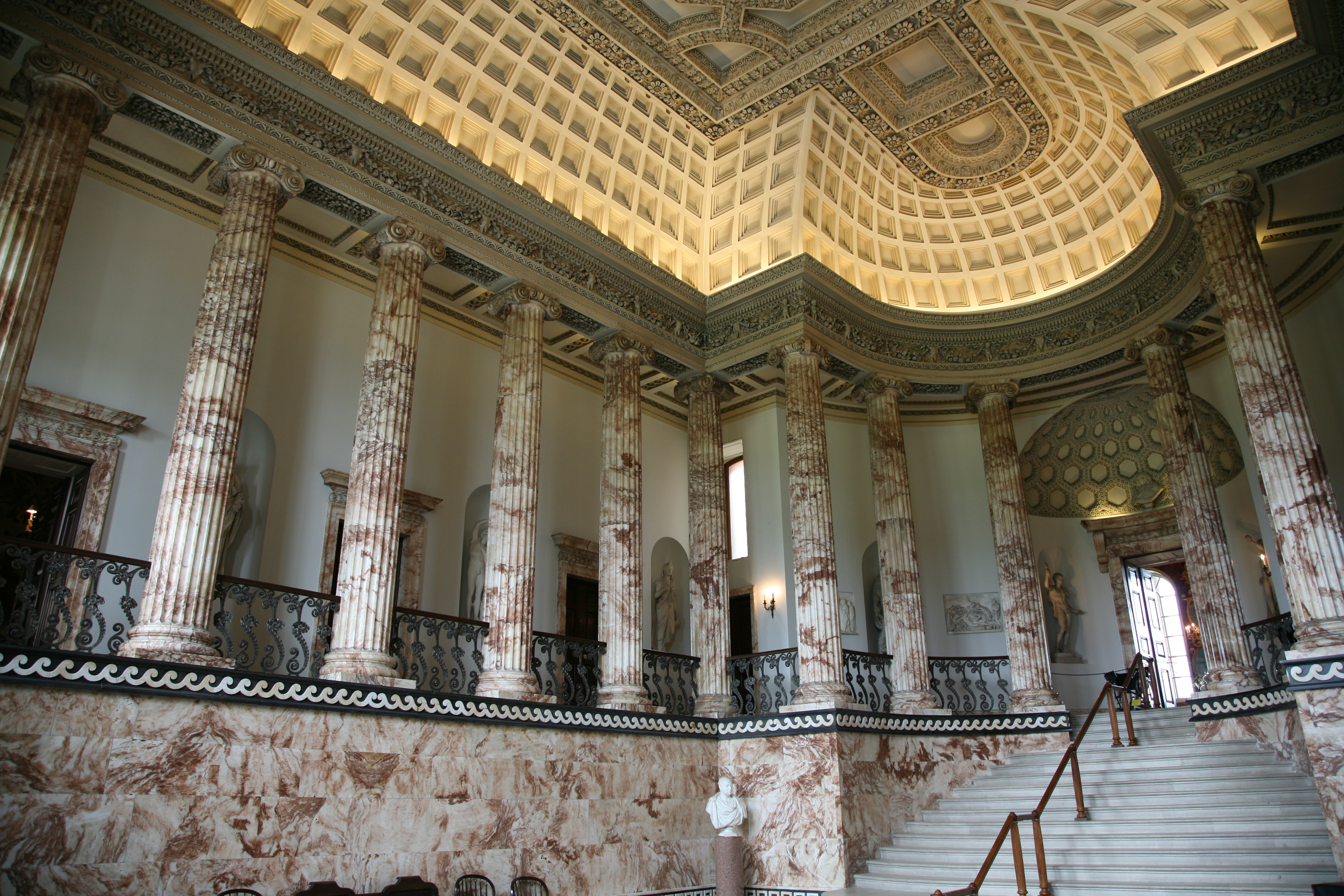
Holkham Hall, Marble Hall

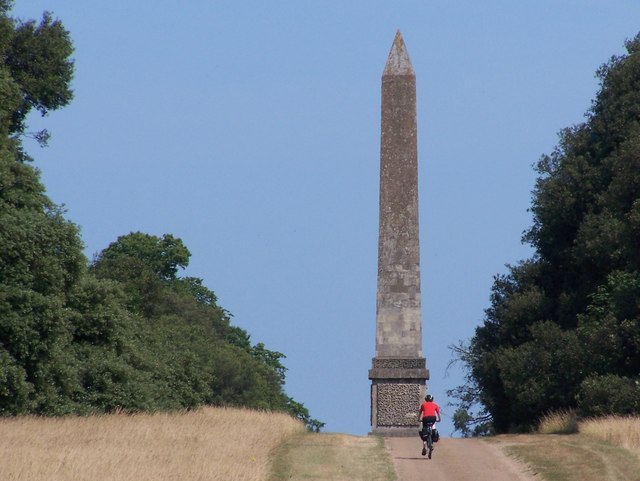
Obelisk, Holkham Hall

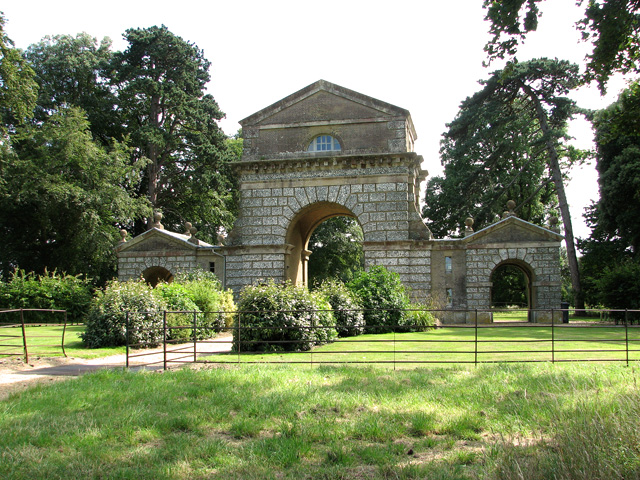
Triumphal Arch, Holkham Hall

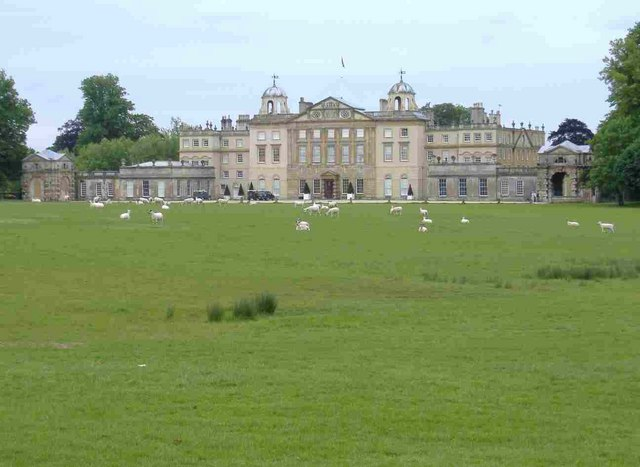
Badminton House

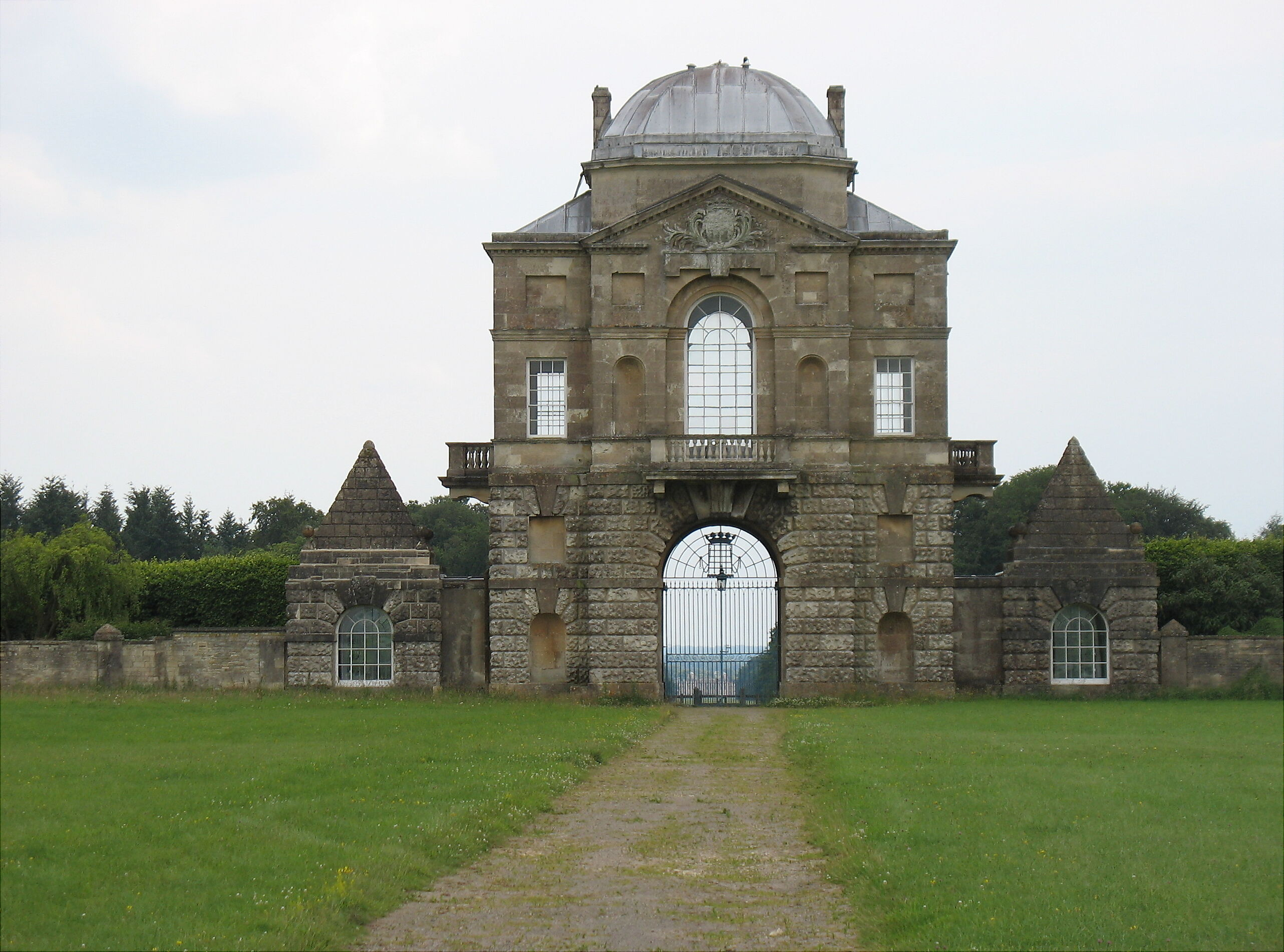
Worcester Lodge, Badminton House

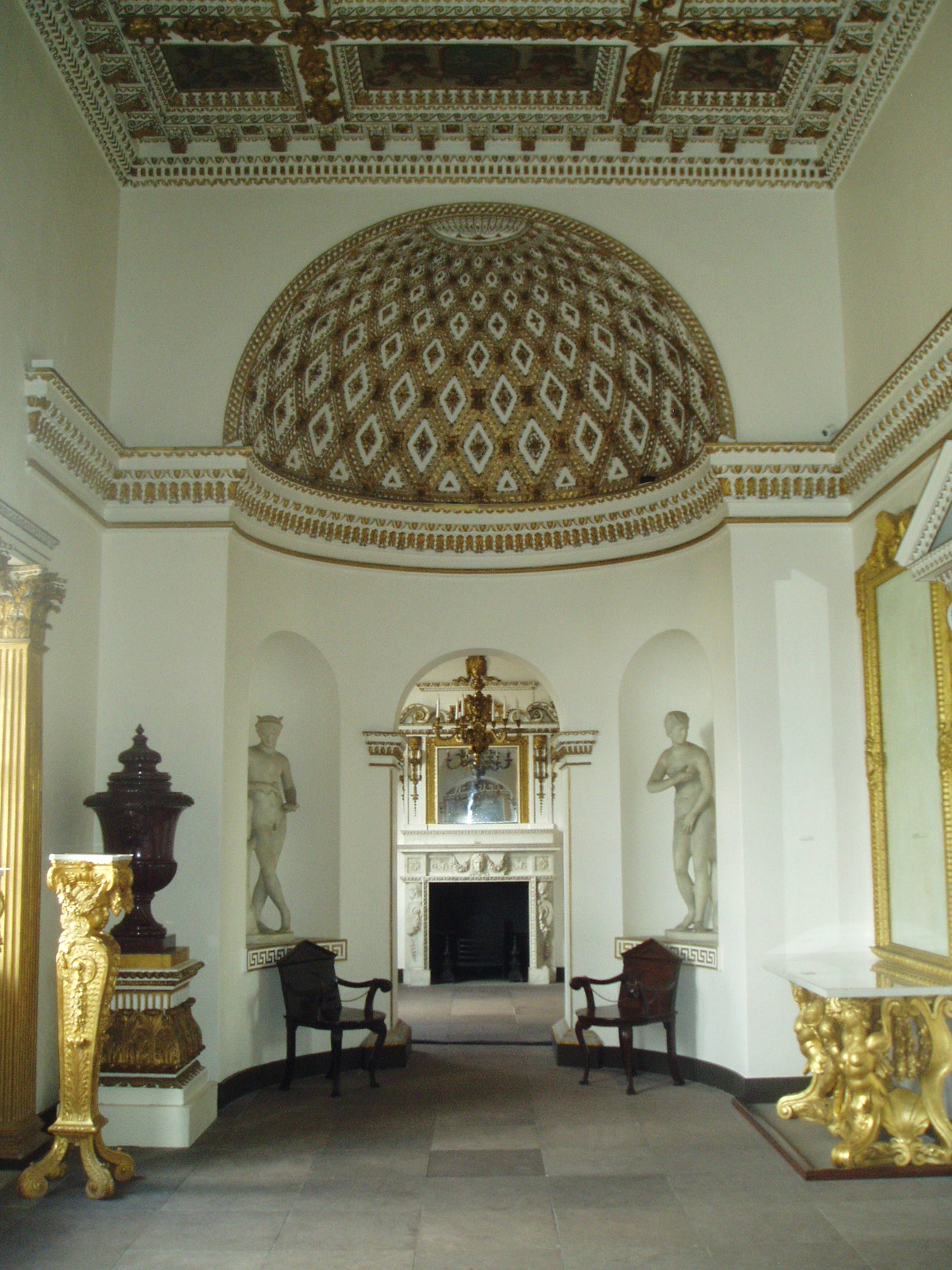
Chiswick House, The Gallery

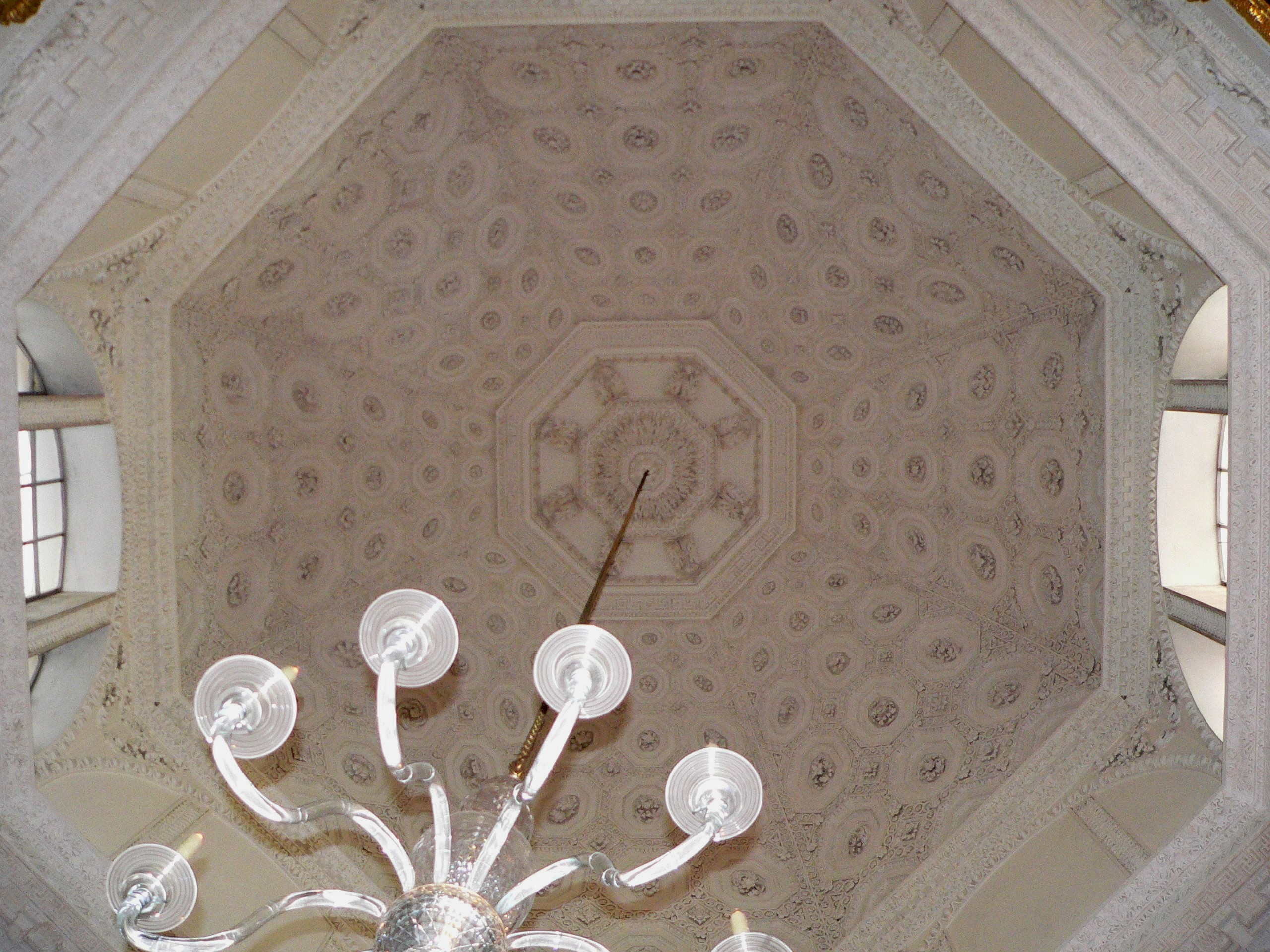
Dome of saloon, Chiswick House

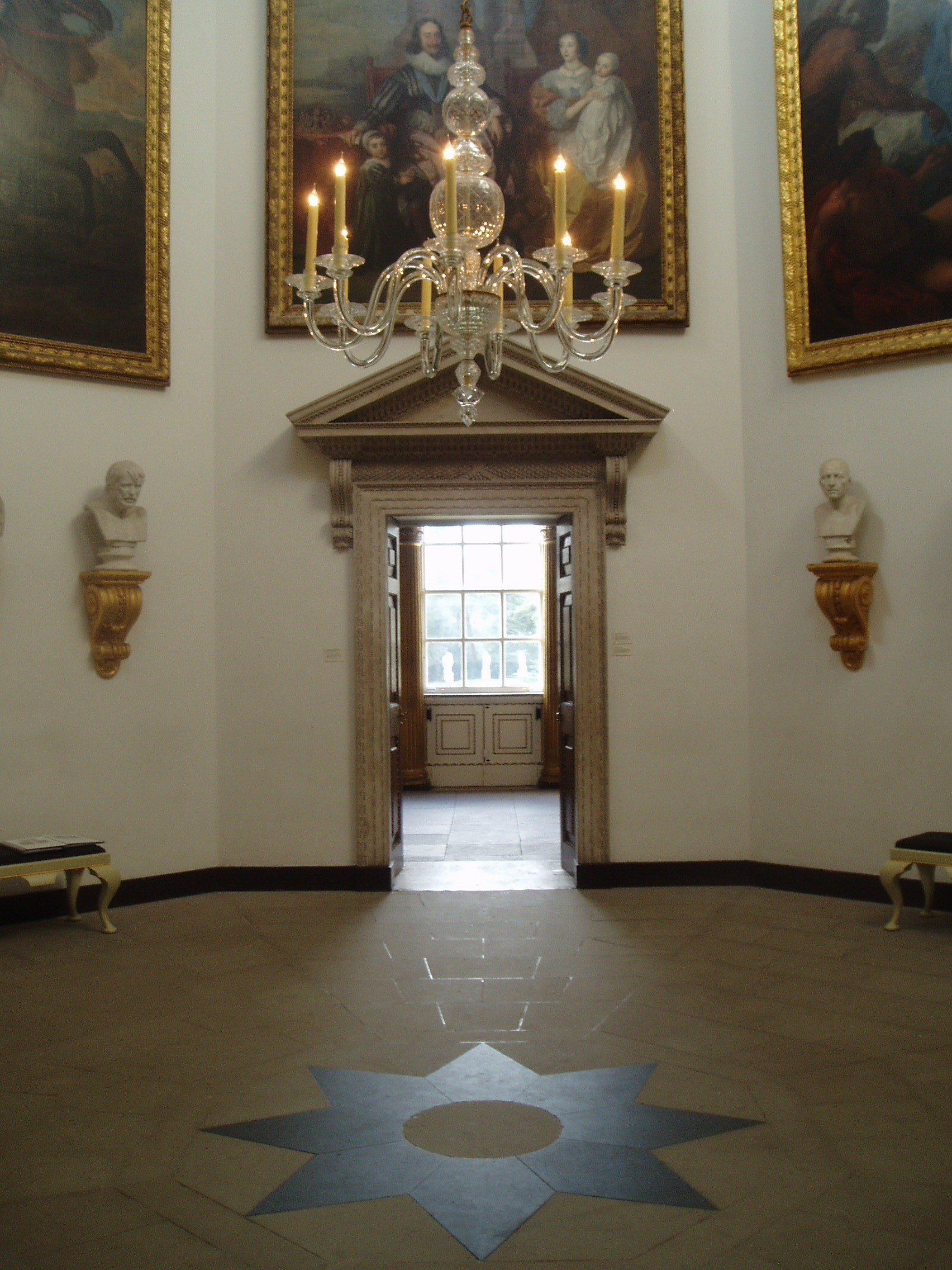
Saloon, Chiswick House

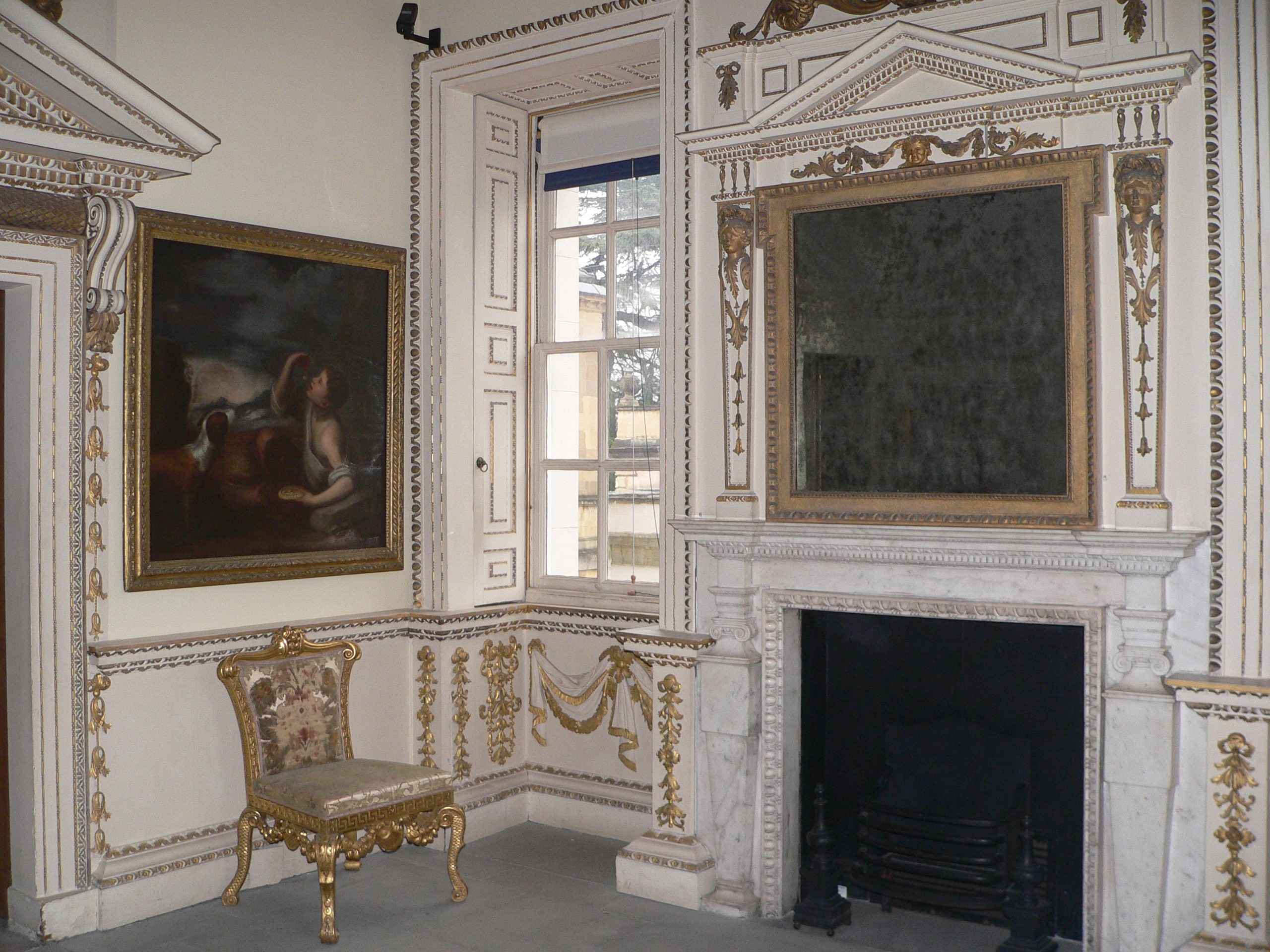
Bedroom, Chiswick House

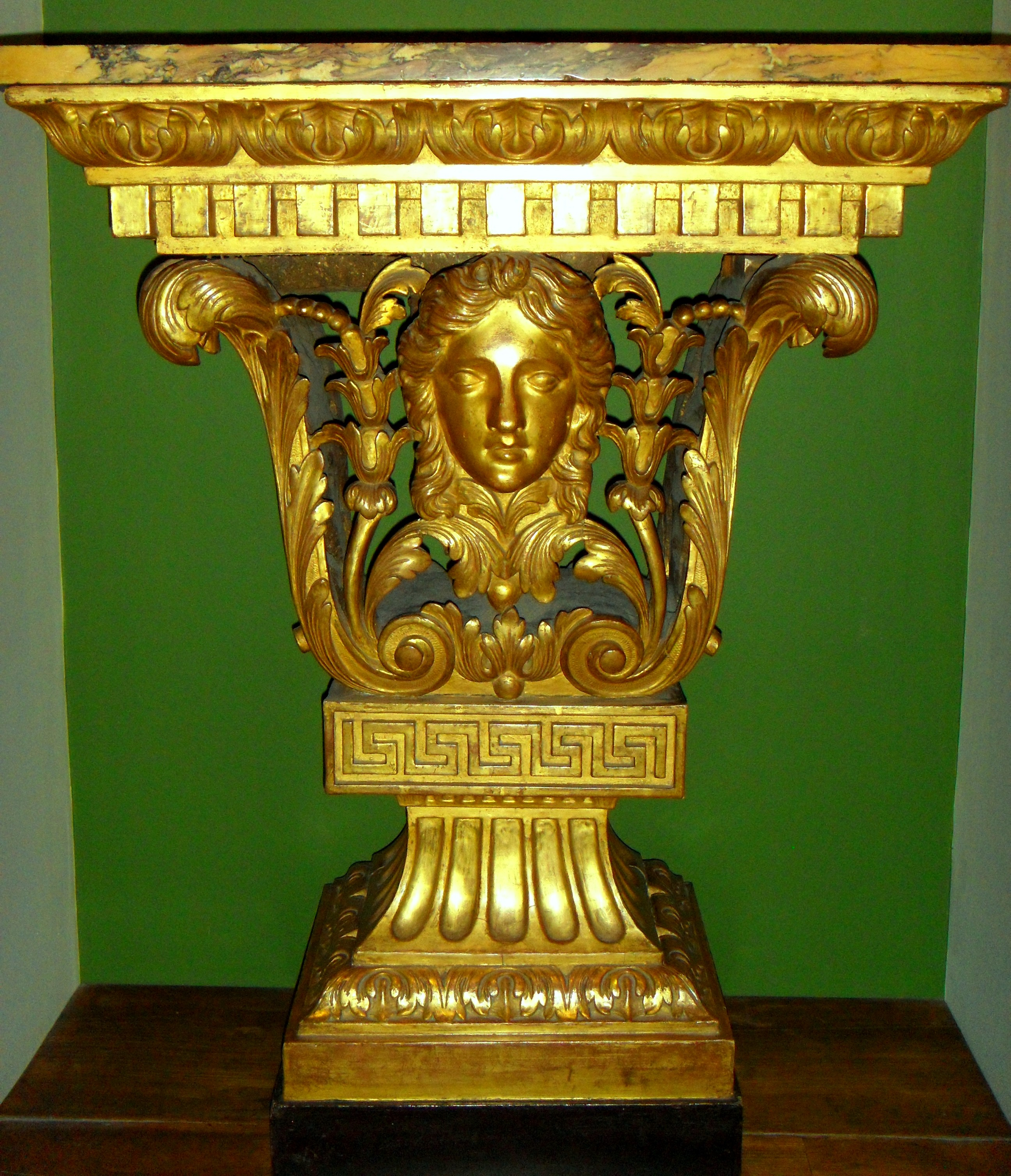
Chiswick House table

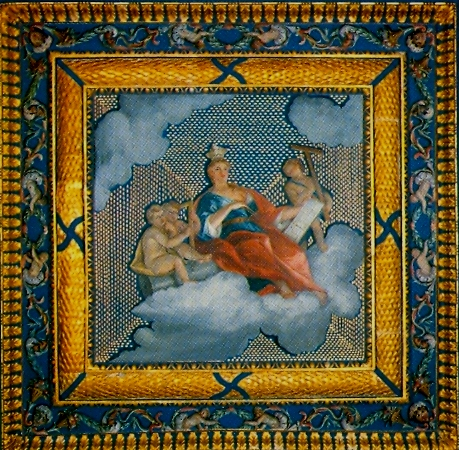
Chiswick House, ceiling of Blue Velvet Room

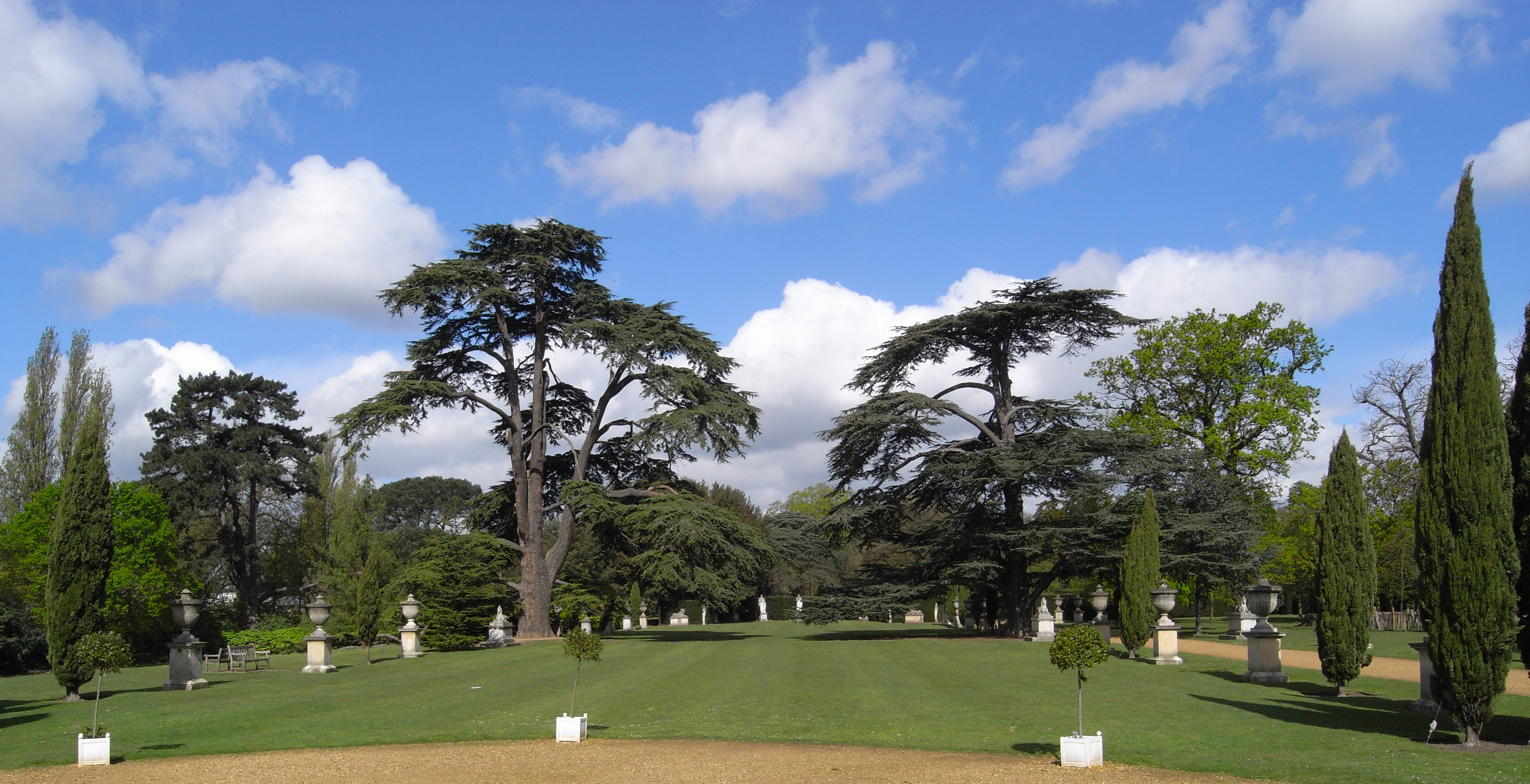
Chiswick House gardens

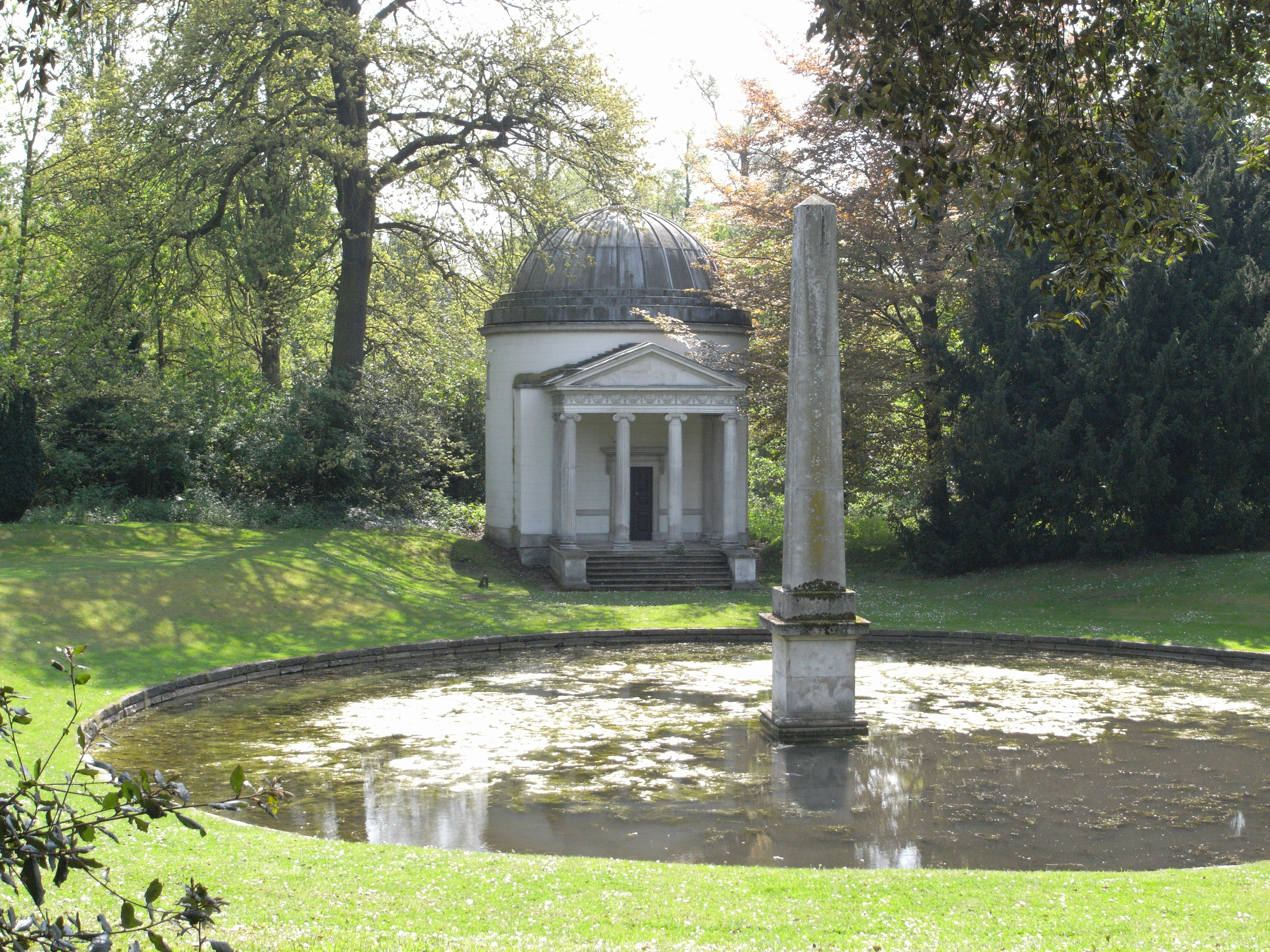
Chiswick House gardens

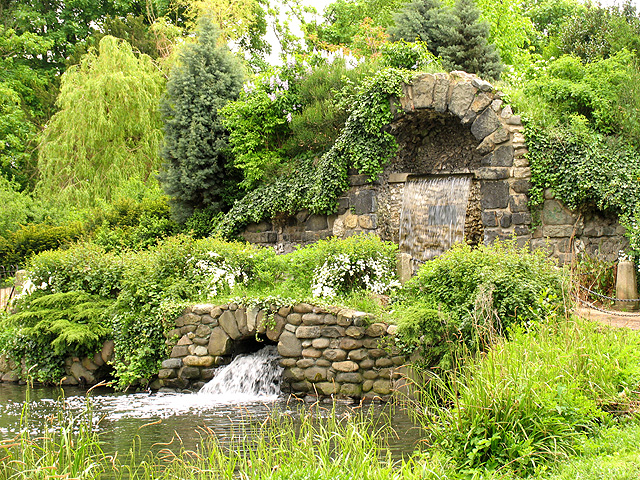
Chiswick House gardens

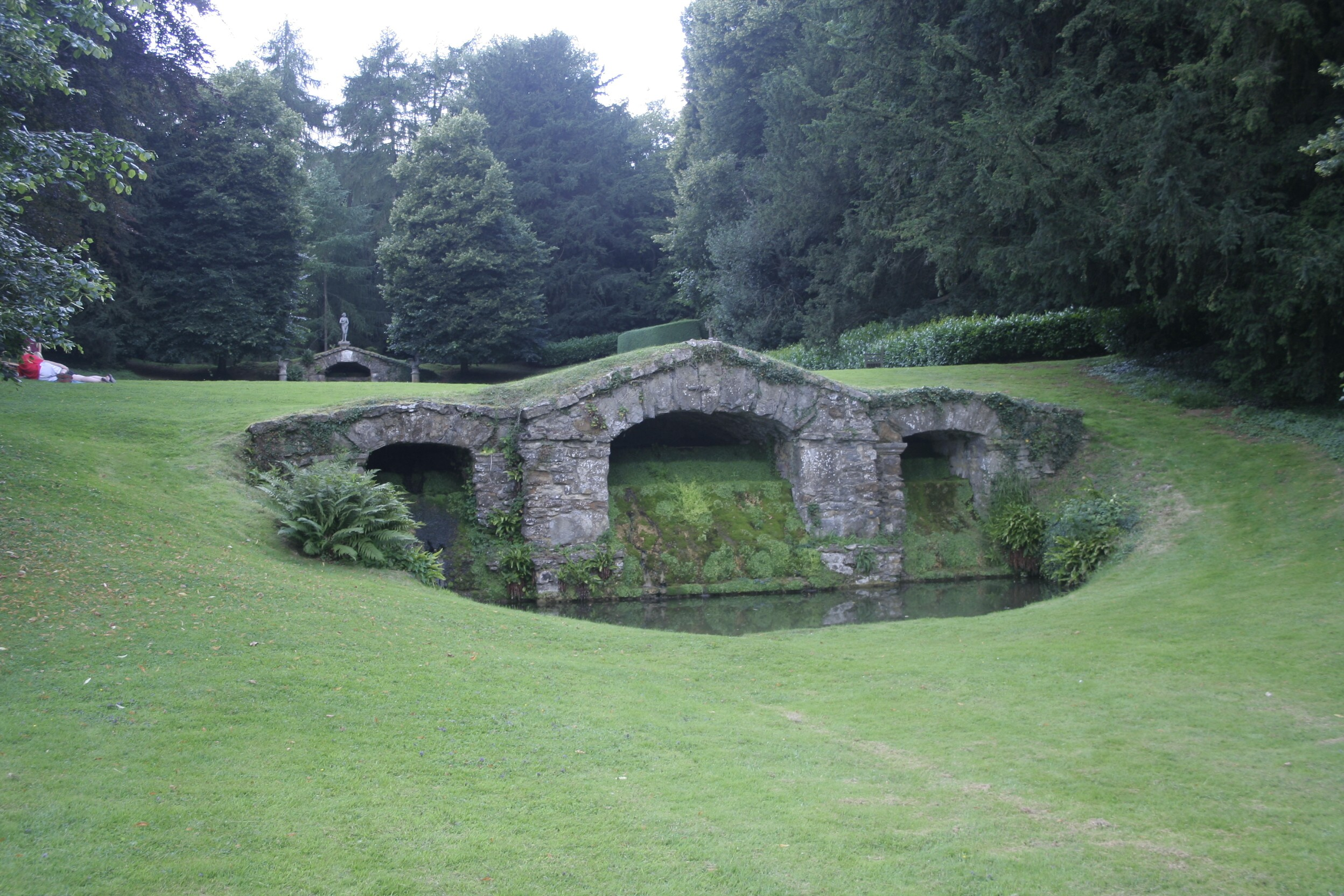
Rousham Cascade

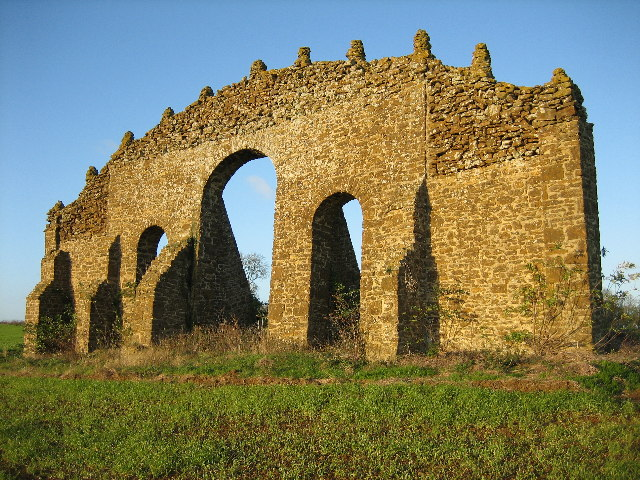
Eyecatcher, Rousham

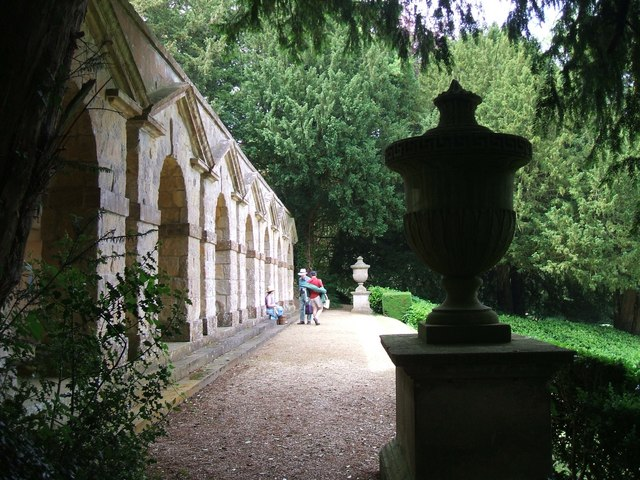
'Praeneste', Rousham

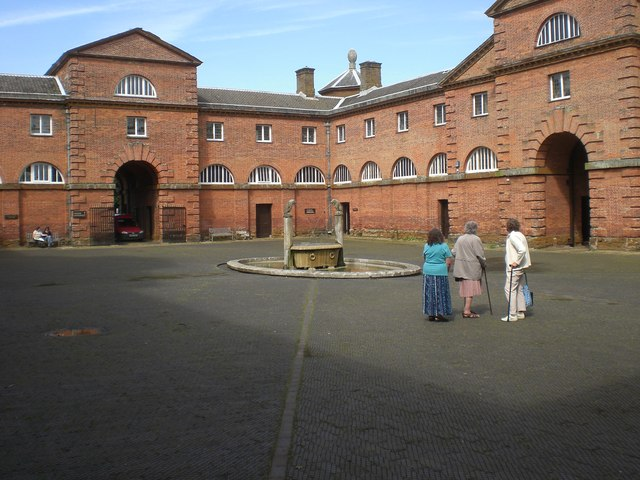
Houghton Hall stableyard

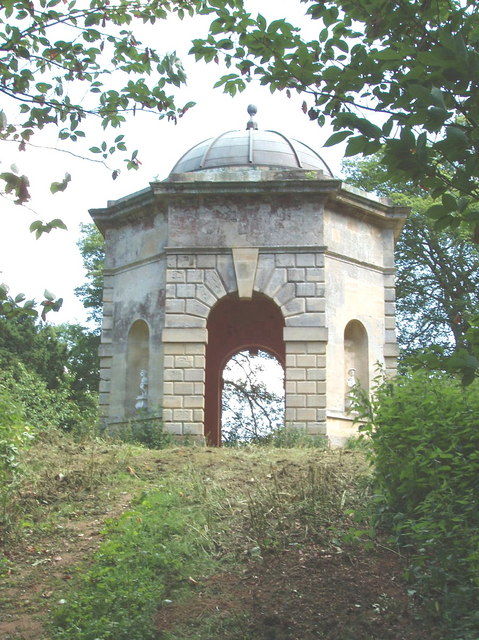
Temple, Shotover House

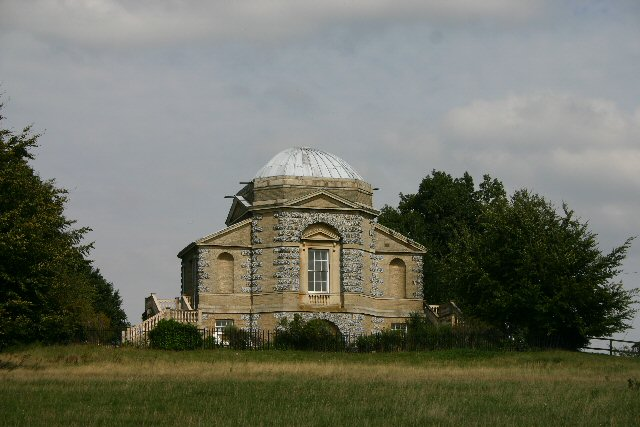
Temple, Euston Park

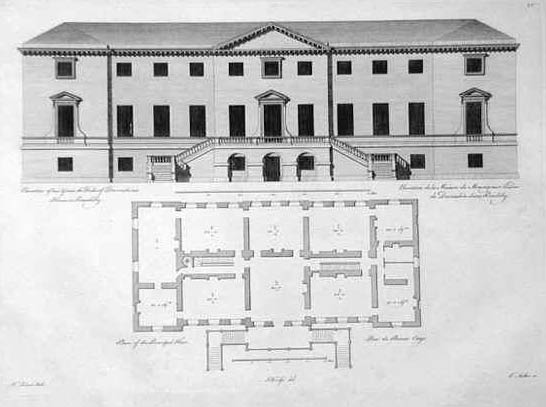
Devonshire House, London

=== Public buildings and royal commissions ===
- Chiesa di San Giuliano dei Fiamminghi, painted ceiling (c.1717)
- York Minster, marble pavement (1731–35)
- Royal Mews (1731–33), demolished 1830
- Royal State Barge (1732)
- Hampton Court Palace, gateway in Clock Court & rooms for the Duke of Cumberland (1732)
- Kensington Palace, interiors, including Cupola Room and several murals and painted ceilings (1733–35)
- former Treasury building Whitehall (1733–37)
- St James's Palace, the library (1736–37), demolished
- Westminster Hall, Gothic screen enclosing law courts (1738–39), demolished c.1825
- York Minster, Gothic pulpit and choir furniture (1741), removed
- Gloucester Cathedral, Gothic choir-screen (1741), removed 1820
- Horse Guards (1750–59)
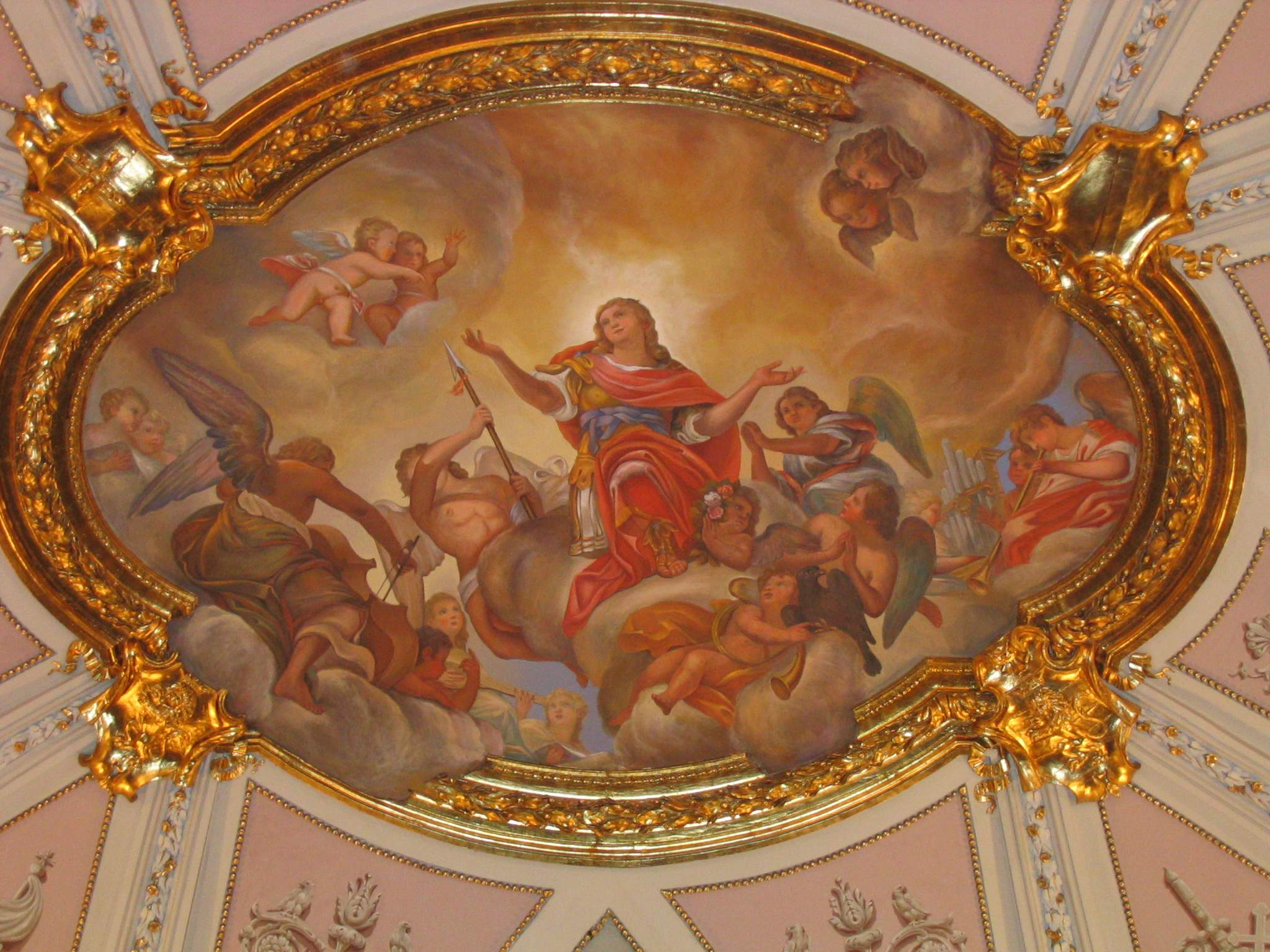
Painted Ceiling Chiesa di San Giuliano dei Fiamminghi Rome, The Apotheosis of St Julian 1717

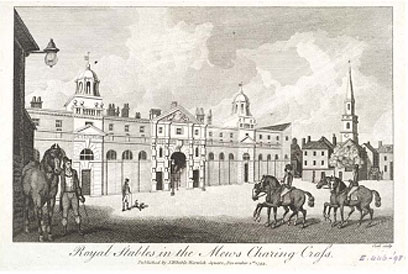
Royal Mews

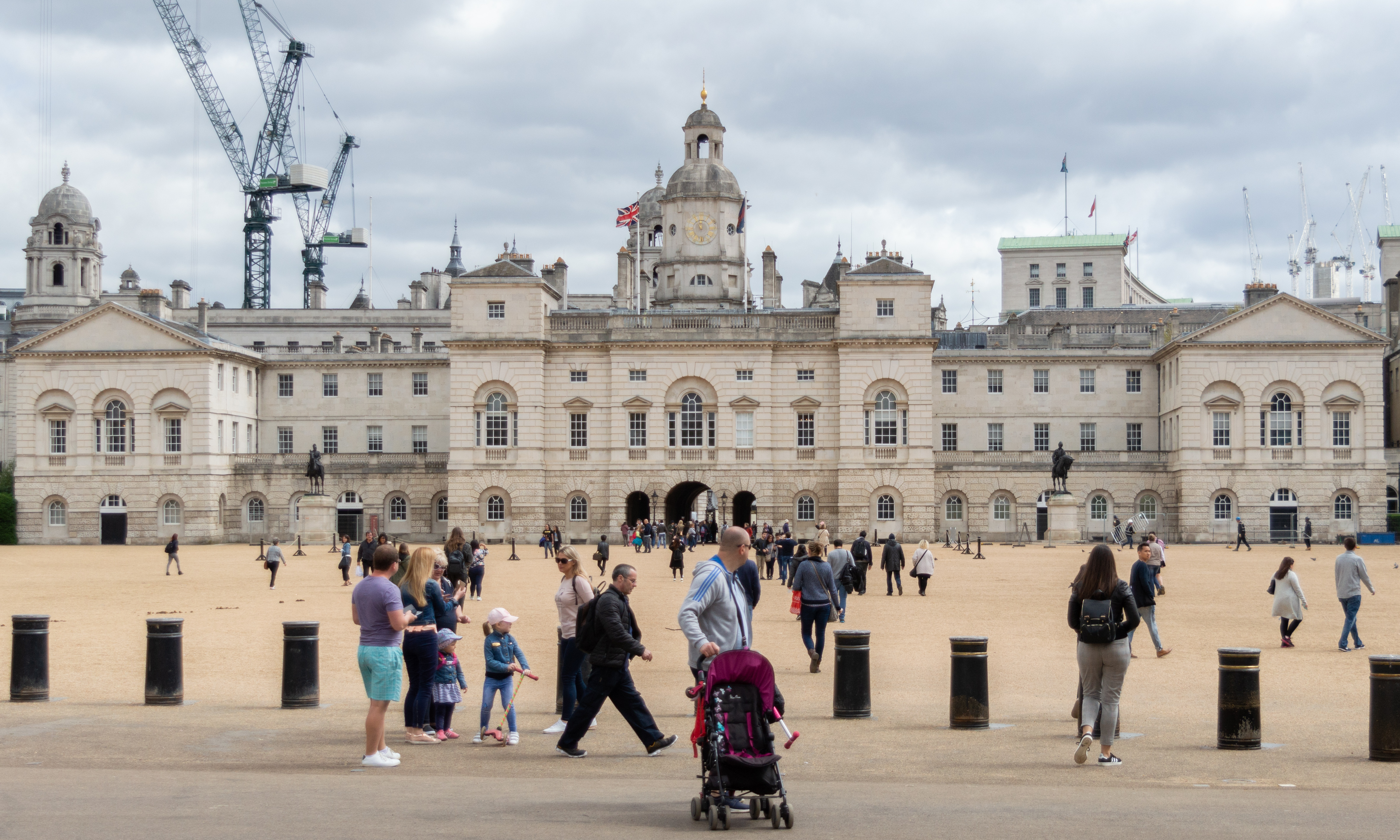
Horse Guards

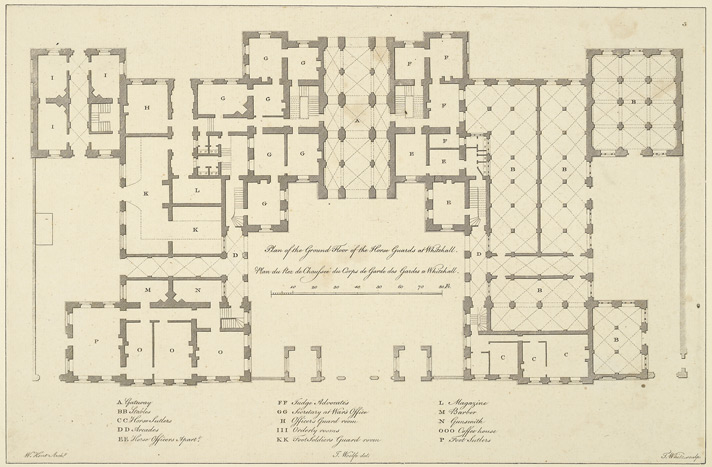
Plan, Horse Guards

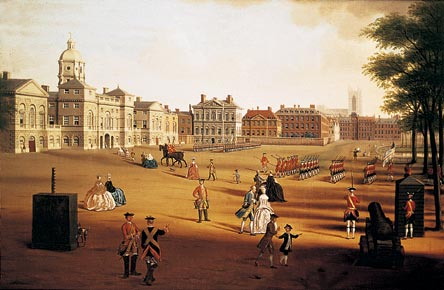
Horse Guards Parade, Kent's Treasury is the stone building just beyond the Horse Guards building

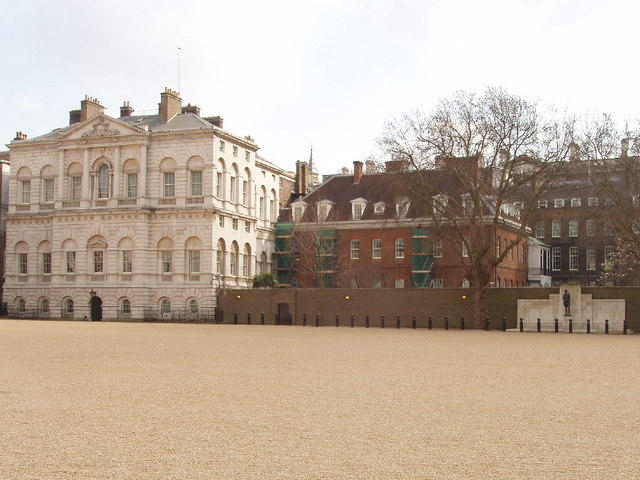
Former Treasury Building, on left

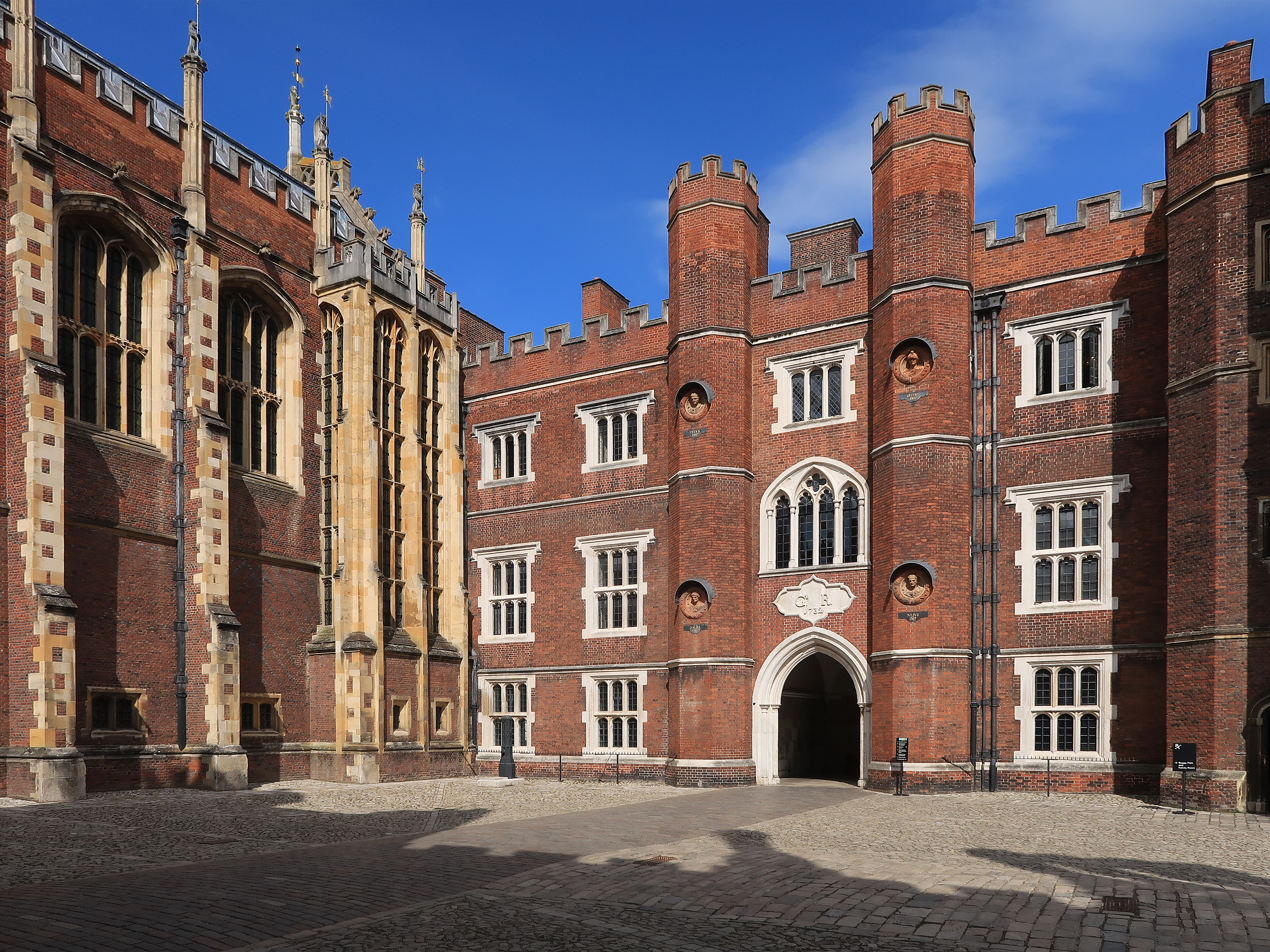
Gateway (on right), Clock Court, Hampton Court Palace

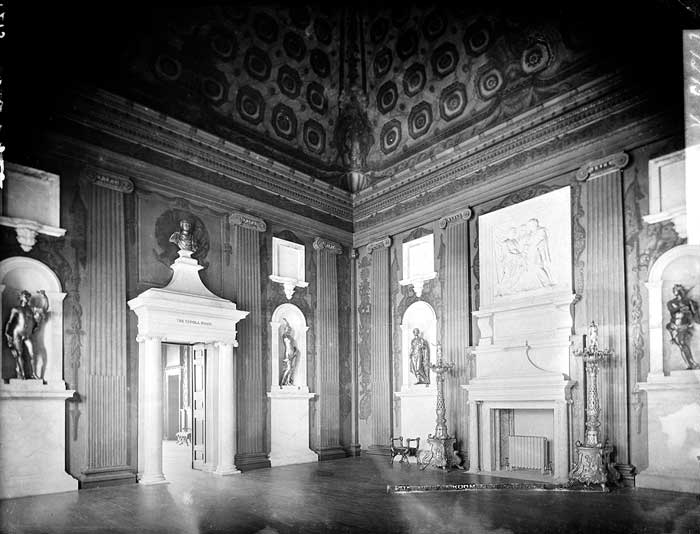
Kensington Palace Cupola Room

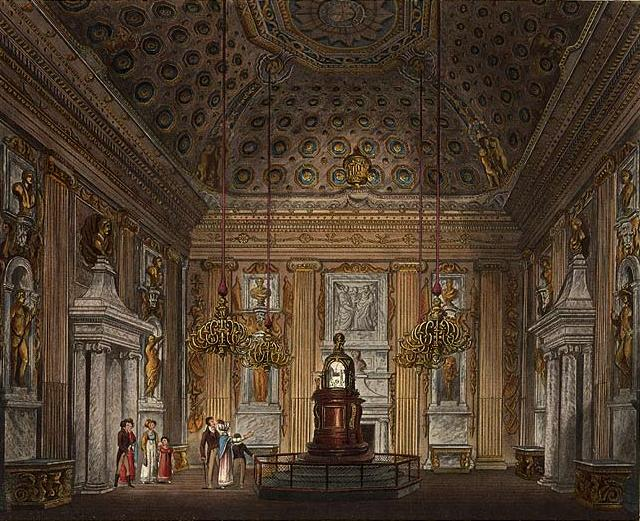
Kensington Palace Cupola Room

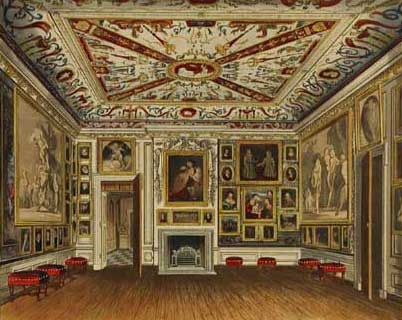
painted ceiling, Presence Chamber, Kensington Palace

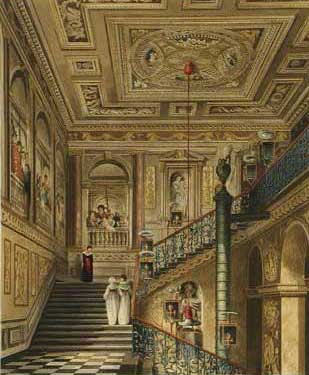
mural & ceiling, Great Staircase, Kensington Palace

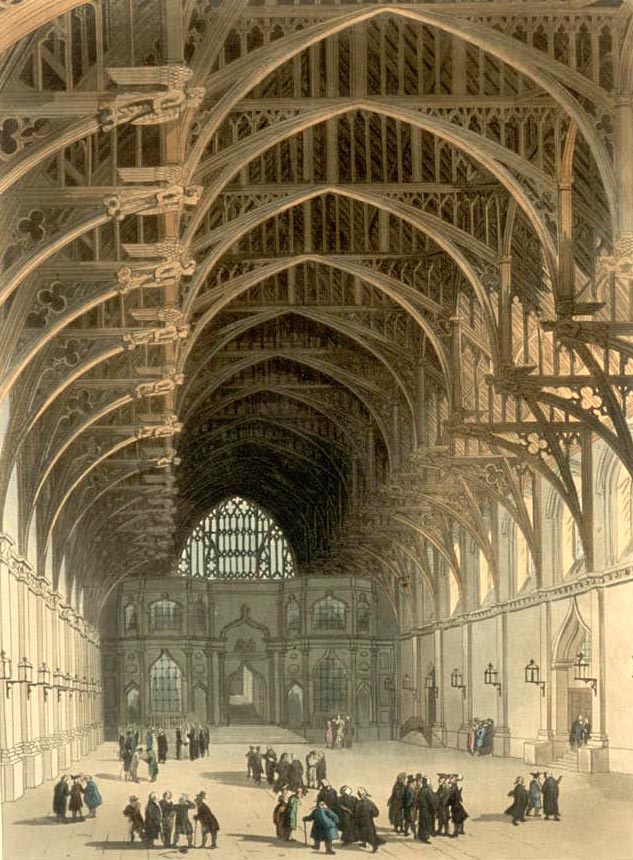
Westminster Hall, with Kent's screen in place

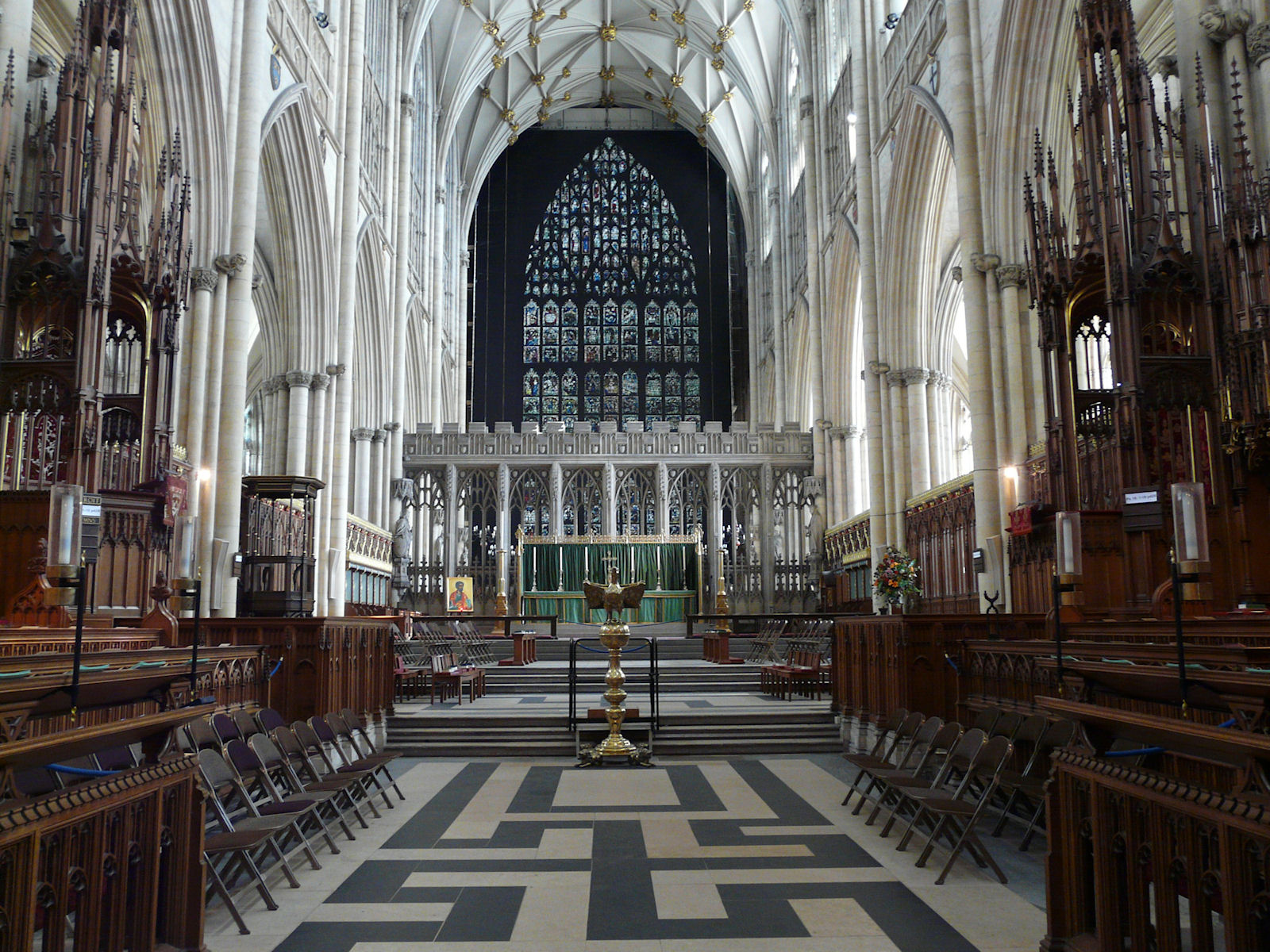
Choir York Minster, showing Kent's black & white marble floor

=== Church memorials ===
- Chester Cathedral, to John and Thomas Wainwright
- Henry VII Lady Chapel, to George Monck, 1st Duke of Albemarle (1730)
- York Minster, to Thomas Watson Wentworth (1731)
- Westminster Abbey to Sir Isaac Newton, sculpted by John Michael Rysbrack (1731)
- Kirkthorpe church, to Thomas and Catherine Stringer (1731–32)
- Blenheim Palace Chapel, to John Churchill, 1st Duke of Marlborough, sculpted by John Michael Rysbrack (1733)
- Westminster Abbey, to James Stanhope, 1st Earl Stanhope (1733)
- Westminster Abbey, to William Shakespeare, sculpted by Peter Scheemakers (1740)
- Ashby-de-la-Zouch, to Theophilus Hastings, 9th Earl of Huntingdon (1746)
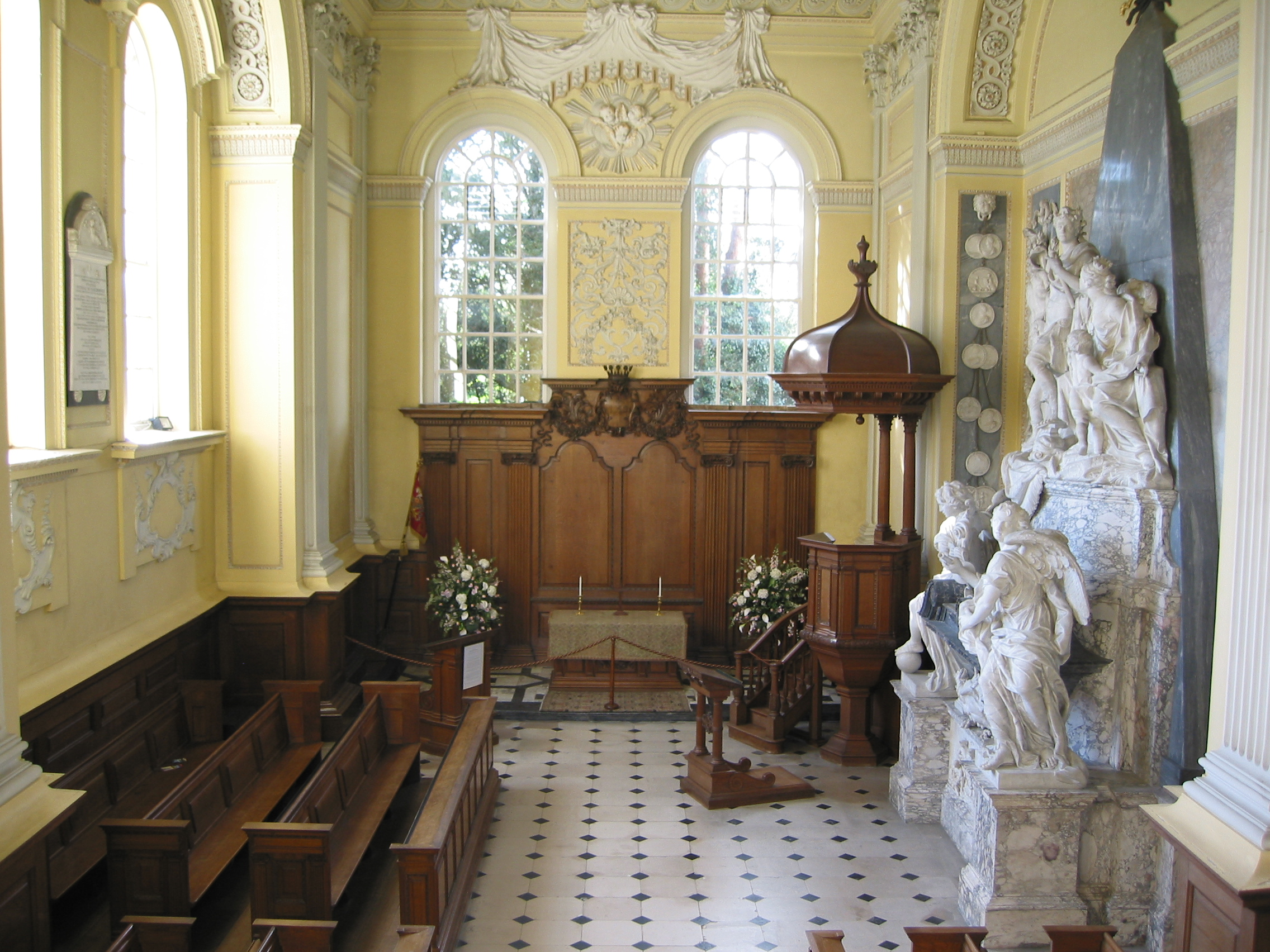
Chapel, Blenheim Palace, Marlborough tomb on right

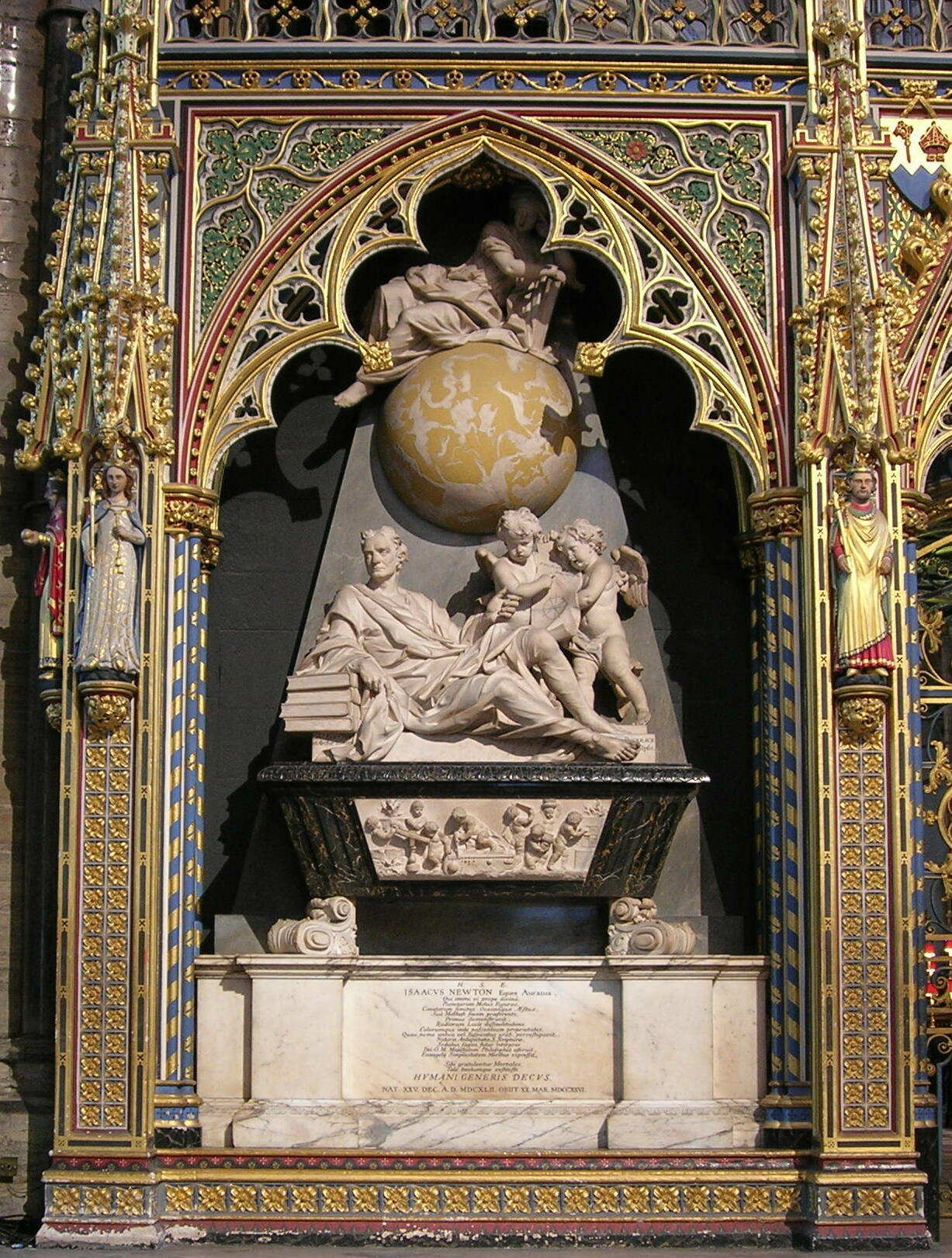
Sir Isaac Newton's memorial, Westminster Abbey

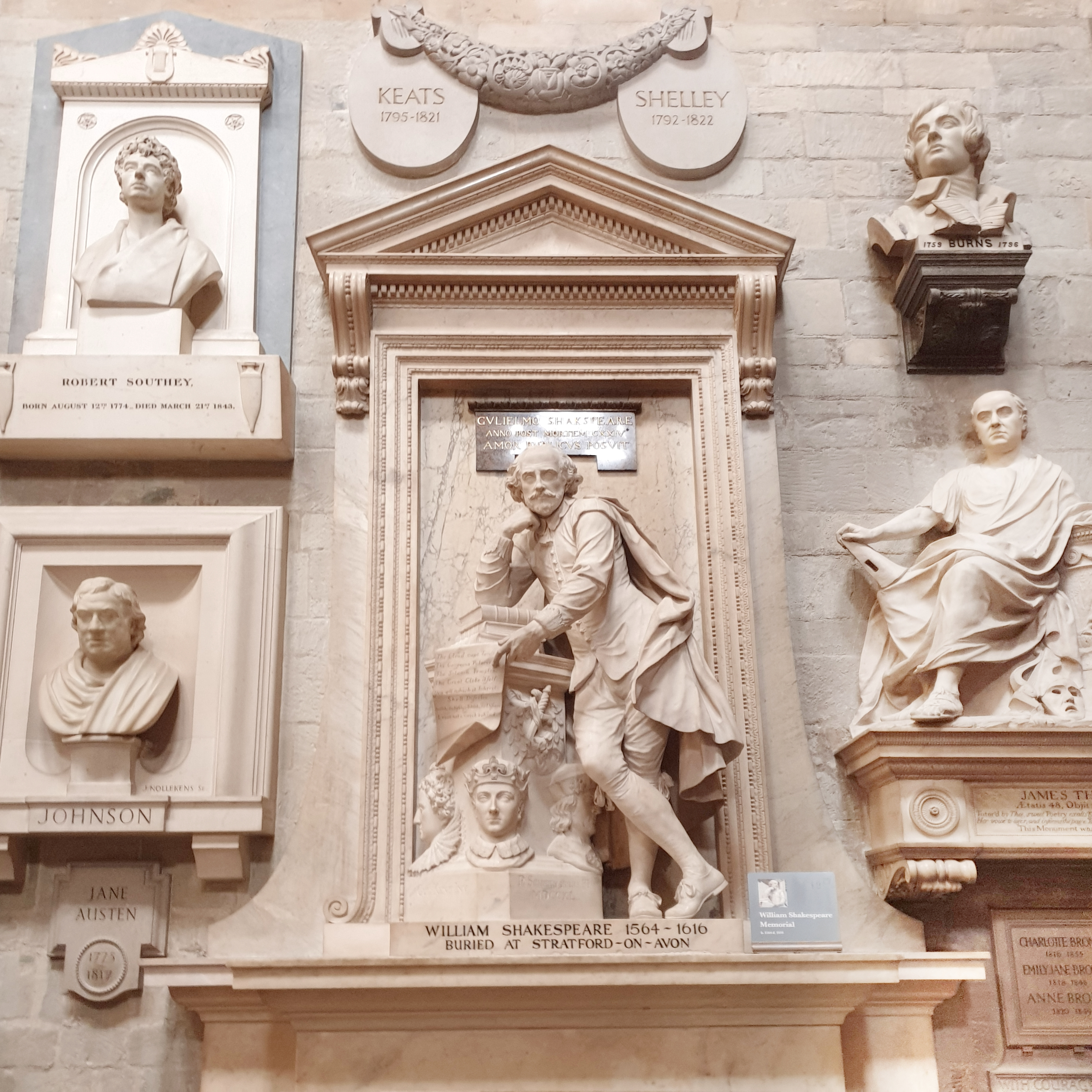
Poets' Corner, Westminster Abbey, with the Shakespeare memorial

== Exhibition ==
From 20 September 2013 to 9 February 2014, the Bard Graduate Center in New York exhibited William Kent: Designing Georgian Britain. The exhibit focused on Kent’s work from 1709 to 1748 and was "the first major exhibition to examine the life and career of one of the most influential designers in eighteenth-century Britain". The exhibit was co-organized with the Victoria & Albert Museum where it was on display 22 March – 13 July 2014. The exhibit catalogue was written by Susan Weber (ISBN 978-0-300-19618-4).

== In popular culture ==
In the first episode of the television series The Gentlemen, his philosophy is referred to as "the reconciliation of the feral with the refined".

Court offices
| Preceded by Sir Godfrey Kneller | Principal Painter in Ordinary to the King; 1723–1748 | Succeeded by John Shackleton |
