= San Giuliano dei Fiamminghi =

Church of St. Julian of the Flemings
- Sint-Juliaan-der-Vlamingen (in Dutch); Saint-Julien des Flamands (in French); S. Iuliani Flandrensium (in Latin)
- San Giuliano dei Fiamminghi (in Italian)
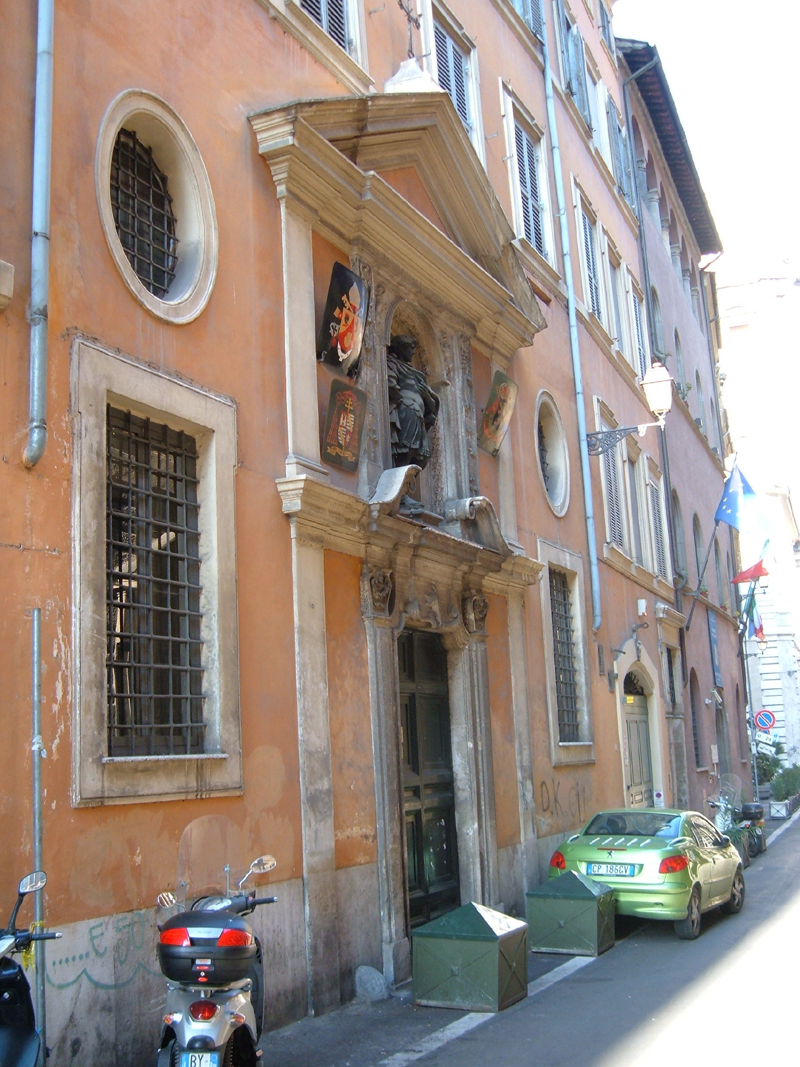
- Entrance of the Church of St. Julian of the Flemings, National Church in Rome of Belgium.
- Click on the map for a fullscreen view
- 41°53′45.2″N 12°28′33″E
- Location: Via del Sudario 40, Sant'Eustachio, Rome
- Country: Italy
- Denomination: Catholic Church
- Tradition: Roman Rite
- Website: sangiulianodeifiamminghi.com

History
- Status: Rectory church, titulus, national church
- Dedication: Julian the Hospitaller

Architecture
- Architect: Antonio Maria Borioni
- Architectural type: Church
- Style: Baroque
- Groundbreaking: 1675
- Completed: 18th Century

Administration
- Province: Lazio

The Church of St. Julian of the Flemings (Italian: Chiesa di S. Giuliano dei Fiamminghi, Dutch: Sint-Juliaan-der-Vlamingen, French: Saint-Julien des Flamands, Latin: S. Iuliani Flandrensium) is a Roman Catholic church dedicated to Saint Julian the Hospitaller, located in Rome, Italy. Historically, the church has been the National Church in Rome of the Southern Netherlands and, in 1830, became the national church of the Kingdom of Belgium.

According to tradition, the church was built when Flanders converted to the Christian faith, during the pontificate of Gregory II (715–753). The little church is part of a Roman building that was once the hospice of St. Julian of the Flemings, built to shelter pilgrims from the county of Flanders (Belgium). Its official denomination since 1979 is "Royal Belgian church and Foundation of Saint Julian of the Flemings" (Dutch: Koninklijke Belgische kerk en stichting Sint-Juliaan der Vlamingen, French: Eglise et fondation royale belge Saint Julien des Flamands).

In the Consistory of November 26, 1994, Jan Pieter Schotte was appointed the first Cardinal-Deacon of St. Julian, a position now occupied by Cardinal Walter Brandmüller, created in 2010.

== History ==
Immediately after their conversion, German pilgrims started to arrive in Rome to visit the cult places of Saint Peter and Saint Paul. Guesthouses were built to shelter and feed them – small hospices of the Saxons, the Lombards, the Frisians and the Franks. Tradition situates the foundation of the hospice of St Julian in the 8th century, when Flanders was converted to the Christian faith during the pontificate of Pope Gregory II (715–753). However, it was probably in the 11th century that the Christian community of Flemish expatriates in Rome built a hospice for their fellow-countrymen, both pilgrims and visitors, with a chapel dedicated to their patron saint. In 1096, Robert II, Count of Flanders visited the hospice on his way to the Holy Land, during the First Crusade, and possibly oversaw its restoration.

The first historical references to a chapel of St Julian date from the early 15th century. In this period the popes returned to Rome, after their long exile in Avignon. The return of the papal court to Rome attracted many foreigners to the city. Soon the Netherlands created its own infrastructure to shelter the increasing number of Dutch pilgrims. From this period comes one of the oldest writings of St Julian's, a copy of which is extant: the statutes and regulations of the hospice for pilgrims in 1444.

From 1624, the Confraternita dei Fiamminghi that ran the hospice of St Julian carefully kept records of Dutch pilgrims who visited Rome. From 1624 to 1790, 21,213 were given shelter, mainly from Flanders, but also from Artois, Namur, Hainaut, Tournai and Cambrai.

Under the influence of the Renaissance popes, Rome became a center of culture, a magnet for painters, sculptors, musicians and scholars. Supported by foundations such as St Julian of the Flemings, Rome became a place of immigration for Flemings from the 15th to the 17th century. Shoemakers, carpenters, goldsmiths, tailors and soldiers found their second home in Rome. The aim of the foundation was to help the needy Flemish pilgrims (old galley slaves, released slaves, and the poor). The wealthy Flemings of Rome, the high clergy, merchants, craftsmen and renowned artists became members of the board of the hospice and associate members of the Brotherhood of St Julian. This brotherhood had both a religious and a material dimension. It acquired much prestige in 1536 when the Holy Roman Emperor Charles V, born in Ghent, became a member.

Although initially the statutes of the foundation restricted the members of its management board to Flemings from the county of Flanders, people from other parts of the Southern Netherlands (Antwerp, Tournai, Binche …) gradually took part to the functioning of St Julian. The directors of the hospice started to receive financial support from all parts of the Netherlands. With time, the little church of St Julian became more than a center for material support and served as a meeting place for all the southern Dutch living in Rome.

In the course of the early Modern Era, the scope of the hospice widened as it became a social center and a source of financial support for the Flemings living in Rome, promoting contacts between Flemings living in Rome. Merchants of Flemish origin acted as patrons of Flemish artists. Active in the administration of Saint Julian between 1618 and 1643, the banker Pieter de Visscher, born in Oudenaarde, had his house in Frascati decorated with frescoes by Flemish Baroque painter Cornelis Schut. Renowned artists such as Jan Miel and Louis Cousin (il Primo Luigi Gentile, Brussels) were part of the board of St. Julian. The most important patron of the foundation was Nicholas Haringhe, a pharmacist from Ypres, who donated all his fortune in the late 17th century to the hospice of St Julian. In 1695 he commissioned the current main altar painting to his friend Theodor Helmbreker.

The old organization of the foundation of St Julian disappeared when the French took control of the foundation between 1798 and 1814. The church was then officially transferred to the Kingdom of the Netherlands, and eventually to the Kingdom of Belgium.

In 1844, the newly established Belgian Pontifical College was located in the home of Mgr. Aerts, rector of the Belgian national Church of S. Guiliano.

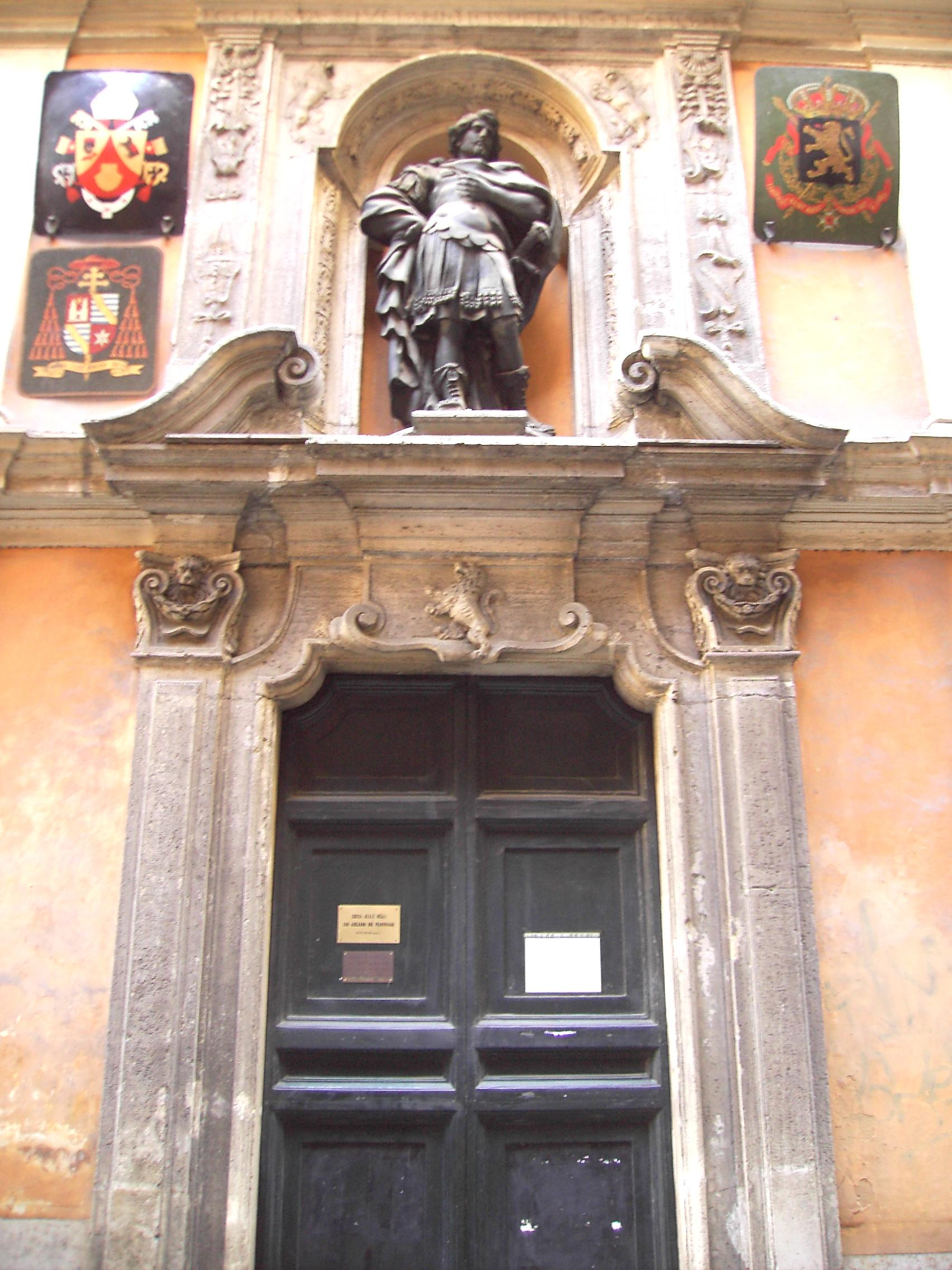
Entrance of the Church.

== Exterior ==
The church is part of a larger building. The Baroque façade is decorated with a statue of St Julian the Hospitaller, located above the main entrance door, which is flanked by four windows, a pair of circular ones over a pair of rectangular ones. The shields of the Four Members (Bruges and the Franc of Bruges, Ghent, and Ypres) also surround the medallion and adorn the facade of the church under the heading: ECCLESIA S. GIULIANI HOSPITALIS FLANDRIAE. Above the entrance of the church, a Latin inscription summarizes the history of the building until 1785.

TEMPLVM HOC ET XENODOCHIVM FLANDRICAE GENTIS PIETATE DIVO JULIANO ANNO SALVTIS DCCXIII DICATVM
A ROBERTO FLANDRIAE COMITE RESTITVTVM CENSVQ ADAVCTVM ANNO MXCIV SEDENTE EVGENIO IV SOLEMNI RITV CONSECRATVM
IN SPLENDIDIOREM FORMAM ANNO MDCLXXXI REDACTVM PROVISORES SOLO MARMOREO STERNI CURARVNT
ANNO DOMINI MDCCLXXXV

== Interior ==
The hospice was thoroughly renovated in 1681–1682. Inspired by Bernini's Sant'Andrea al Quirinale, the church got its octagonal oval shape in the early 18th century. Antonio Maria Borioni (? - 1727) designed and coordinated the construction of the new church, assisted by his brother Asdrubal Borioni. Most artworks date from the early 18th century.

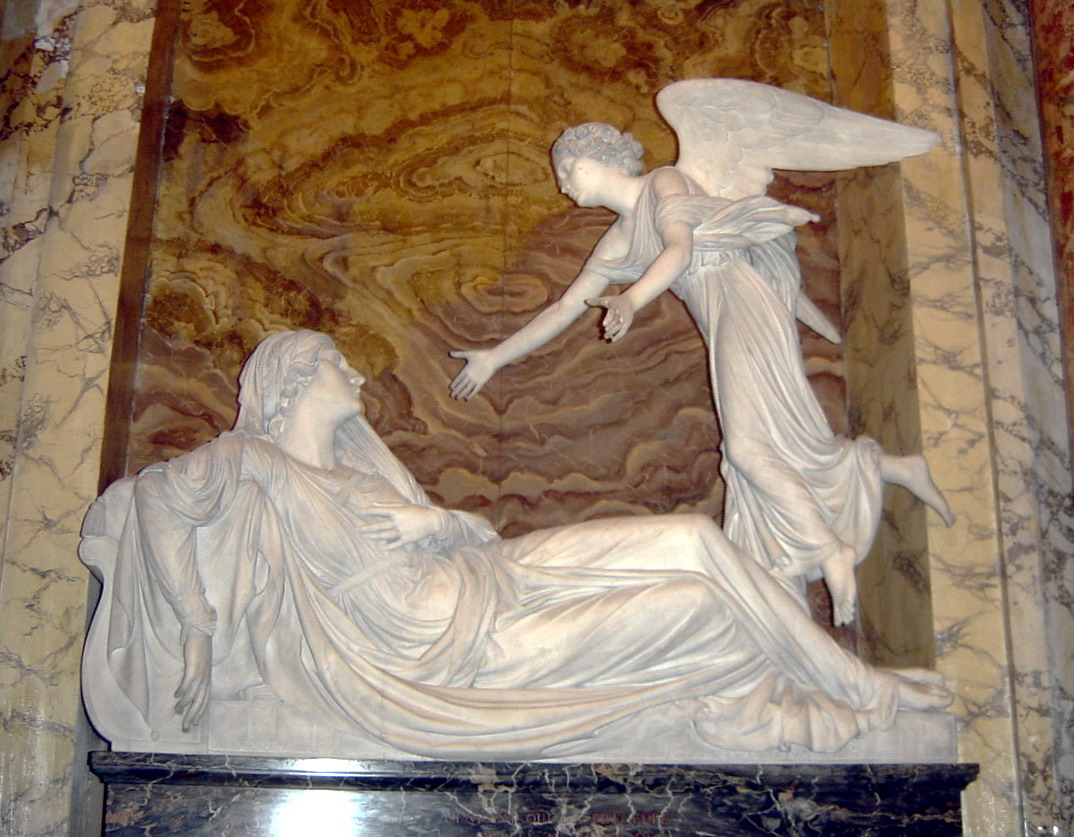
Monument Funeraire de la Comtesse de Celles

The central medallion of the vault depicts the apotheosis of Saint Julian the Hospitaller. The fresco was painted in 1717 by Englishman William Kent, later known as creator of the English garden and court architect.

The medallion is surrounded by four allegorical figures representing Flanders: Bruges and the Brugse Vrije, Ghent, and Ypres. Over one of the side altars is a 1743 painting by Maximilian De Haese, depicting the apostles Peter and Paul.

The monument to Ludovica de Timbrune-Valence by Mathieu Kessels was erected about 1830. The Comtesse de Celles was the wife of the then Belgian ambassador and is invited into heaven by her pre-deceased daughter in the form of an angel.

== Sint-Juliaan Fondation ==
The patrimony of the foundation consists today of three apartment buildings from the 18th to 19th centuries. The income of the foundation comes from the rent of these apartments to 35 tenants. It has currently no support from the Belgian federal government. The purpose of the foundation has remained for centuries: offer help and hospitality to pilgrims, compatriots who reside in Rome or visit the Eternal City.

St. Julian's also offers hospitality to the Fondation Lambert Darchis, which offers scholarships to young people from the province of Liège who wish to complete their artistic or religious training in Rome. The Rector of Sint-Juliaan is also the managing director.

The "Collegio Musicale San Giuliano dei Fiamminghi" was established with the support of Father Hugo Vanermen, Rector of the Church and Royal Belgian Foundation San Giuliano dei Fiamminghi in Rome, with the aim of creating a stable group for the performance of concerts dedicated to the Baroque repertoire.

== Cardinal-deacons ==
St. Julian's was established as a titular church in 1994.

- Jan Pieter Schotte (26 November 1994 – 10 January 2005)
- Vacant (2005–2010)
- Walter Brandmüller (2010-), became pro hac vice title in 2021

== See also ==
- w:it:Chiesa di Santa Maria della Pietà in Camposanto dei Teutonici
- w:nl:Brugse Vrije

== Bibliography ==
- Brabandere, Jan; De Groof, Bart; Ickx, Johan (1996), 1000 Jaar San Giuliano Dei Fiamminghi, Art Books Intl Ltd, ISBN 90-74377-37-8
- Ickx, Johan (1996), "783 years "San Giuliano dei Fiamminghi"?", Archivum Historiae Pontificiae, 34: 369–375, archived from the original on 2009-10-03
- Lammerant, Yolande (2000), Les pèlerins des Pays-Bas méridionaux à Saint-Julien-des-Flamands à Rome au XVIIe et XVIIIe siècle, Pèlerins et pèlerinages dans l'Europe moderne, École Française de Rome, doi:10.1400/37009
- Viaene, Vincent (2001), Belgium and the Holy See from Gregory XVI to Pius IX (1831–1859), Catholic Revival, Society and Politics in 19th-Century Europe, Leuven: Leuven University Press, ISBN 90-5867-138-0
