= Jan Pieter Schotte =

Belgian cardinal

His Eminence Jan Pieter Schotte CICM
- President of the Labour Office of the Apostolic See
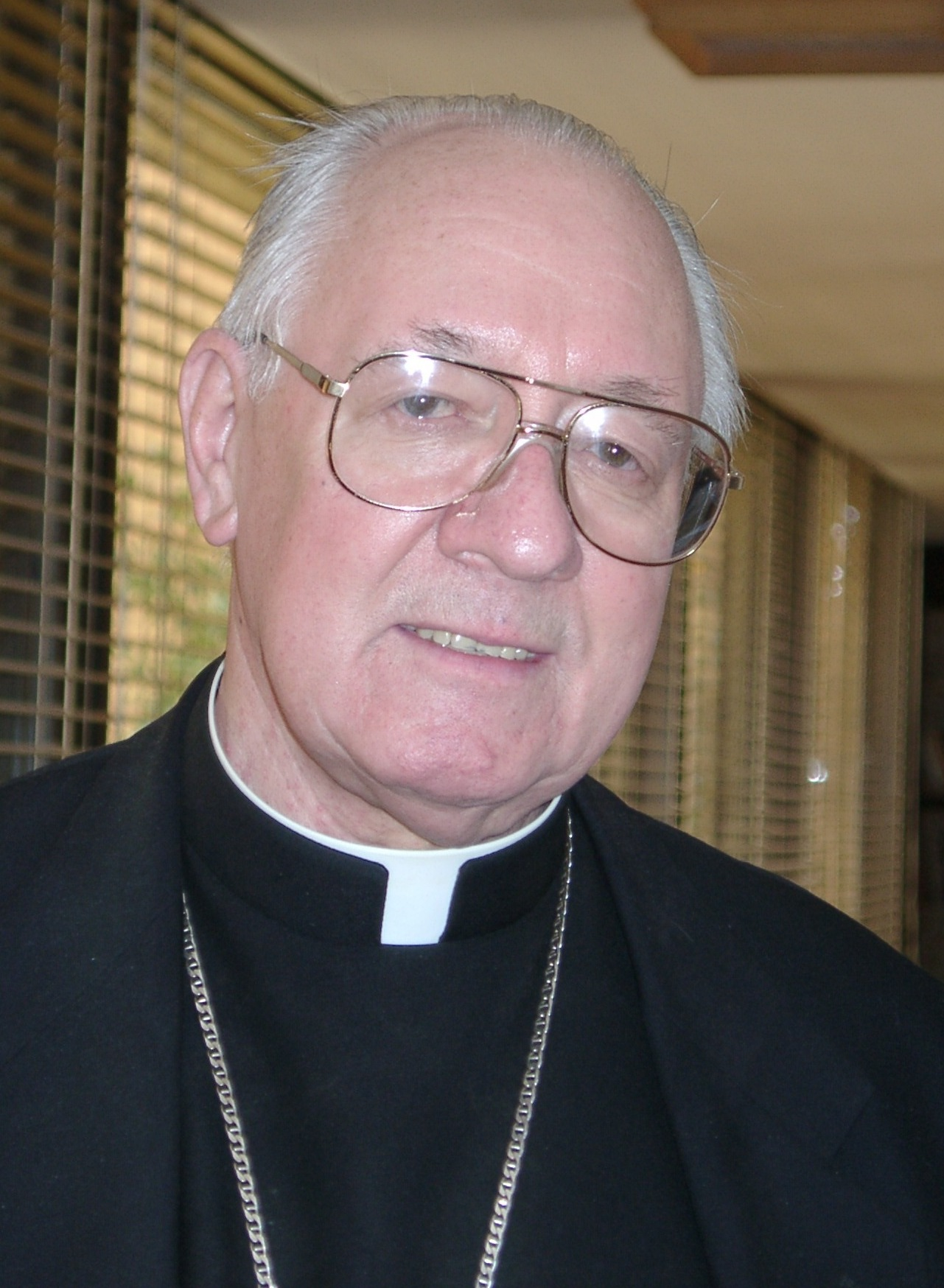
- Schotte in 2003
- Church: Latin Church
- Appointed: 14 April 1989
- Term ended: 10 January 2005
- Successor: Francesco Marchisano
- Other post: Cardinal-Deacon of San Giuliano dei Fiamminghi (1994–2005)
- Previous posts: Secretary of the Pontifical Commission for Justice and Peace (1980–83); Titular Bishop of Silli (1983–85); Vice-President of the Pontifical Commission of Justice and Peace (1983–85); Titular Archbishop of Silli (1985–94); Secretary General of the Synod of Bishops (1985–2004)

Orders
- Ordination: 3 August 1952
- Consecration: 6 January 1984 by Pope John Paul II
- Created cardinal: 26 November 1994 by Pope John Paul II
- Rank: Cardinal-deacon

Personal details
- Born: Jan Pieter Schotte; 29 April 1928 Beveren-Leie, Belgium
- Died: 10 January 2005 (aged 76) Agostino Gemelli University Polyclinic, Rome, Italy
- Buried: Campo Verano (2005–08); San Giuliano dei Fiamminghi
- Education: Université catholique de Louvain; Catholic University of America
- Motto: Parare viam Domino pacis

Jan Pieter Schotte CICM (29 April 1928 – 10 January 2005) was a Belgian cardinal and an official of the Roman Curia.

== Biography ==
He was born on 29 April 1928 in the town of Beveren-Leie (now a part of Waregem) in the province of West Flanders. He entered the Congregation of the Immaculate Heart of Mary (CICM Missionaries) in 1946. He was ordained a priest in 1952. From 1953 to 1956 he studied canon law at the Catholic University of Leuven, Belgium and from 1962 to 1963 at The Catholic University of America in Washington, DC. From 1955 to 1962, he was professor of canon law at the CICM theological seminary in Leuven and from 1957 to 1962 assistant professor at the Higher Institute of Religious Sciences, Catholic University of Leuven, Belgium. He was vice-rector of the CICM theological seminary in Leuven from 1956 to 1962. In 1963, he became rector of the Immaculate Heart mission seminary in Washington, DC, where he served until 1966. In 1967, he came to Rome as General Secretary of the Congregation of the Immaculate Heart of Mary, a post he held until 1972.

Jan Schotte became a bishop in 1984 and an archbishop in 1985. On 26 November 1994 he was given the red hat of cardinal. Schotte was the Secretary General of the Synod of Bishops from 1985 until 2004, leaving the post when Pope John Paul II accepted the resignation that Schotte had submitted in 2003 upon achieving the age limit. He was president of the Office of Labor of the Apostolic See from 1989 until his death.

Schotte died on 10 January 2005 in the Agostino Gemelli University Polyclinic in Rome. He was buried in his Deaconry of Saint Julian of the Flemings in Rome. Pope John Paul II delivered the homily at his funeral – the last while John Paul was alive.
