= Synod on Synodality =

Assembly of Bishops in Synod 2023-24

Official logo of the synod, English-speaking version

The 16th Ordinary General Assembly of the Synod of Bishops, commonly referred to as the Synod on Synodality, was a Synod of Bishops of the Catholic Church which concluded 27 October 2024 and had as its theme "For a synodal Church: communion, participation and mission".

The date of the synod was first announced as October 2022, but was then changed to October 2023 because the scope of the synod had been widened. A further extension was announced in October 2022, taking the closing date to October 2024. The list of all 364 participants was published on 7 July 2023.

Women were allowed to vote in the synod, which was the first time women were allowed to vote in any Catholic Synod of Bishops. Approximately 54 women voted.

In advance of the synod's October 2023 assembly, Pope Francis issued the apostolic exhortation Laudate Deum, in which he calls for brisk action against the climate crisis and condemns climate change denial. In a break from previous synods, Pope Francis announced at its conclusion that he would not publish a post-synodal apostolic exhortation, but had instead ratified and published the final document of the synod.

== Background ==
From the beginning of his papacy, Pope Francis expressed his desire to strengthen the collegial aspects of the Church's governance, and he argued for more recognition of charismatic gifts in the Church. On 15 September 2018, Francis approved the new apostolic constitution Episcopalis communio (Episcopal communion). The constitution states that the Synod's final document, if approved by the members with "moral unanimity" and, if the Pope has "granted deliberative power to the Synod Assembly", becomes part of the ordinary Magisterium of Catholic teaching "once it has been ratified and promulgated by him". The new constitution also provides for the laity to send their contributions directly to the synod's secretary general.

Some analysts surmise that the greatest achievement of Francis's papacy may be his creation of a more synodal Catholic church, where synods serve as a platform for open and energetic debate.

== Preparation ==
Former official logo of the synod (stating "2023"), English-speaking version

Pope Francis announced the Synod on Synodality on March 7, 2020.

On 24 May 2019, Nathalie Becquart was appointed, along with four other women and one man, as consultor to the general secretariat of the Synod of Bishops of the Catholic Church. It was the first time for women to be appointed to that position. Becquart saw the appointment as a part of Pope Francis's effort "to implement synodality at every level of the Church's life" and to benefit from the important contribution that women can make. Becquart proposed a symbolic step of asking a woman to lead the retreat for the Roman Curia one year. On 6 February 2021, Pope Francis appointed Becquart as an undersecretary of the Synod of Bishops, making her the first woman to have the right to vote in the Catholic Synod of Bishops. On April 26 2023, Pope Francis announced that women would be allowed to vote at the Sixteenth Ordinary General Assembly of the Synod of Bishops, marking the first time women were allowed to vote at any Catholic Synod of Bishops.

Cardinal Mario Grech, secretary-general of the Synod of Bishops, said that the synod was not like a parliament, where one sides stands to gain as the other loses. It is also not as important who has a vote on the final document, he said, as much as Catholics around the world "dialogue, converse, discern together in order to" find consensus.

On 10 July 2023, five cardinals—Walter Brandmüller, Raymond Leo Burke, Zen Ze-Kiun, Juan Sandoval Íñiguez, and Robert Sarah—sent a set of dubia to Pope Francis concerning the upcoming synod. The cardinals say that the pope answered those dubia the next day and gave them his answers privately. However, since the pope did not answer those dubia with "yes" or "no", the five cardinals then submitted on 21 August 2023 another set of dubia rewording the previous set of dubia; the pope did not answer this latest set. On 2 October 2023, a few days before the beginning of the synod, those five cardinals publicly complained they had not received answers to their second set of dubia. Hours after this public complaint, the Holy See publicly released their answers to the first set of dubia and criticised the cardinals for talking about those matters in public.

The guidelines for the synod were published on 4 October 2023. They stated, among other things, that to preserve "the freedom of expression of each and all regarding their thoughts and to ensure the serenity of the discernment in common, which is the main task entrusted to the assembly, each of the participants is bound to confidentiality and discretion regarding both their own interventions and the interventions of other participants". The guidelines stipulate that "[t]his duty remains in force once the synodal assembly has ended".

== Ecumenical reach ==
Before the beginning of the synod, Pope Francis invited all Christians for a Synod prayer vigil in St. Peter's Square on 30 September 2023. Important church leaders were present, among whom were:

- Rev. Thomas Schirrmacher, General Secretary of the World Evangelical Alliance.
- The Ecumenical Patriarch of Constantinople, Bartholomew I, primate of the Church of Constantinople and honorific head of the Eastern Orthodox Church.
  - Serafim Bădilă, representative of the Romanian Orthodox Church.
  - Andrej Ćilerdžić, representative of the Serbian Orthodox Church.
  - Gennadios Stylianos Stantzios, Bishop of Botswana, representative of the Greek Orthodox Church of Alexandria.
- The Archbishop of Canterbury, Justin Welby, primate of the Church of England and honorific head of the Anglican Communion.
- Anne Burghardt, General Secretary of the Lutheran World Federation.
- Jong Chun Park, President of the World Methodist Council.
- William Wilson, Chairman of the Pentecostal World Fellowship.
- Rev. Elijah M. Brown, General Secretary of the Baptist World Alliance.
- Gebretsadik Debeb, representative of the Ethiopian Orthodox Tewahedo Church.
- Samaan Anba Pola, representative of the Coptic Orthodox Church.
- Khajag Barsamian, representative of the Armenian Apostolic Church.
- Syriac Orthodox Patriarch of Antioch and All the East, Moran Mor Ignatius Aphrem II, primate of the Syriac Orthodox Church.
- Mar Benjamin Paulus, representative of the Assyrian Church of the East.
- Geevarghese Mar Barnabas, representative of the Malankara Orthodox Syrian Church.
- The Old Catholic Archbishop of Utrecht, Bernd Wallet, primate of the Old Catholic Church of the Netherlands and honorific leader of the Union of Utrecht of the Old Catholic Churches.

Kuzipa Nalwamba, representative of the World Council of Churches was also present.

Pope Leo XIV observed at an ecumenical gathering in Rome in June 2025 that:

The contribution of fraternal delegates from the Churches and ecclesial communities of East and West to the recent Synod on Synodality held here in the Vatican was a valuable stimulus to greater reflection on the nature and practice of synodality.

== Synodality ==
Several months before announcing the synod, Pope Francis said that "Synodality is a style, it is a walk together, and it is what the Lord expects from the Church of the third millennium".

According to the International Theological Commission, synodality is "the action of the Spirit in the communion of the Body of Christ and in the missionary journey of the People of God". It is more commonly understood as a process by which the Church undergoes discernment on a variety of issues. Aided by the Holy Spirit, the laity, priests, bishops, and religious each use their own gifts and charisms to help the Church make decisions. The notion of the Church as "synodal" by its very nature requires "careful theological clarification" according to the Commission, as it is a relatively new concept.

== Preparatory documents ==
In September 2021, the Vatican released a preparatory document and "handbook" to dioceses around the world to help them prepare for the synod. According to the document:

The purpose of this synod is not to produce more documents. Rather, it is intended to inspire people to dream about the church we are called to be, to make people's hopes flourish, to stimulate trust, to bind up wounds, to weave new and deeper relationships, to learn from one another, to build bridges, to enlighten minds, warm hearts, and restore strength to our hands for our common mission.

The handbook offers guidance to bishops for how to solicit the thoughts of lay Catholics, as well as non-Catholics and non-Christians, particularly those on the margins of society. It includes a number of questions and discussion prompts in 10 general themes to help promote reflection and the collection of input from a wide variety of stakeholders. The most basic question, according to the document, is "How does this 'journeying together', which takes place today on different levels -- from the local level to the universal one -- allow the church to proclaim the Gospel in accordance with the mission entrusted to her; and what steps does the Spirit invite us to take in order to grow as a synodal church?". Several of the suggested questions include:

- To whom does our particular church "need to listen to" [sic] and how are the laity, especially young people and women, listened to?
- How do we integrate the contribution of consecrated men and women?
- What space is there for the voice of minorities, the discarded, and the excluded?
- Do we identify prejudices and stereotypes that hinder our listening?
- How do we listen to the social and cultural context in which we live?

A prayer used at Councils, Synods and other Church gatherings for hundreds of years, opening words Adsumus, Sancte Spiritus (We stand before You, Holy Spirit) has been adopted for use in advance of synod-related gatherings and services.

== Diocesan phase (2021–2022) ==
Pope Francis officially opened the synodal process on 10 October 2021 at the Vatican. The diocesan phase ran from October 2021 to April 2022.

In England and Wales, the diocesan phase ran from November 2021 to March 2022. The local bishops noted that the participation of lay people in a synod was "unprecedented". The bishops published a National Synthesis Document on 22 June 2022 drawing together the emerging conclusions of this phase, in preparation for the next, continental, phase of the process.

The Irish Catholic bishops published a National Synthesis Document in August 2022 following a similar process across the 22 Irish dioceses.

== Continental phase (2022–2023) ==
The continental phase extended from September 2022 to March 2023. The European Continental Synodal Assembly took place in Prague from 5 to 12 February 2023. For the North American Continental Stage, 10 virtual assemblies took place during December 2022 and January 2023, with a continental synthesis completed by 31 March 2023.

== Universal phase (2023–2024) ==
In April 2023, it was announced that 70 non-bishops (including deacons, priests, consecrated men and women, and Catholic laity) would be able to participate and vote at the Assembly.

In June 2023, the working document (Instrumentum laboris) was released.

The final or universal phase started on 4 October 2023 with a synodal assembly taking place at the Vatican after a three-day retreat held in Sacrofano.

The October session, held behind closed doors, took place over a three week period. The assembly proceedings were described by some who had attended as "long and demanding". On October 13, Sister María de los Dolores Palencia Gómez led the Synod, which made her the first woman to preside over any Catholic Synod of Bishops.

A summary report was published on 28 October 2023 entitled A Synodal Church in Mission. At the end of the synodal assembly, the Pope referred back to the Synod's ultimate goal:

The Lord will guide us and help us to be a more synodal and missionary Church, a Church that adores God and serves the women and men of our time, going forth to bring everyone the consoling joy of the Gospel.

The synod itself would continue until October 2024; the period until then was intended to "allow everyone to concretely participate" in the synodal process.

== Final document ==
On 26 October 2024 the synod's deliberation meeting concluded.

Thereafter, the same day, in an unprecedented move, Pope Francis presented and ratified the Synod's "final document", choosing to do so instead of issuing a post-synodal apostolic exhortation. By doing so, Francis gave more authority to the document by giving it magisterial authority (though the document is not to be considered as binding).

There are five main sections within the final document, inviting five forms of conversion to be realised across the church: spiritual, relational, procedural, institutional, and missionary.

A November 2024 note accompanying the Synod's final document, signed by Francis, states that the final document "participates in the ordinary magisterium of the successor of Peter, and as such, I ask that it be accepted". Furthermore, this note states that the pope asks that the document's decisions be implemented; the pope said that while the document's decisions were "not strictly normative", "[l]ocal churches [are obligated] to make choices consistent with what [has been] indicated".

== Implementation (2025–today) ==
In March 2025, the Holy See released a letter announcing that "the synod’s new phase will focus on applying its conclusions at all levels of the church, with dioceses, bishops’ conferences and religious communities working to integrate synodality into daily church life" before an assembly at the Vatican planned for 2028.

In June 2025, the Holy See released the document Pathways for the Implementation Phase of the Synod intended to provide keys to understand the implementation of the decisions of the Synod on Synodality.

A commission of the Holy See studying how to implement the Synod on Synodality's decisions in the Catholic canon law, published its final report in September 2026, containing recommendations.

== Criticism ==
=== Catholic Church ===
Cardinal Gerhard Ludwig Müller compared the synod to an "Anglican synodal meeting" and claimed that "some in the assembly are 'abusing the Holy Spirit' in order to introduce 'new doctrines' such as an acceptance of homosexuality, women priests and a change in Church governance." Cardinal Joseph Zen wrote that "if legitimized...[it]can change everything, the doctrine of faith and the discipline of moral life."

The Catholic Herald criticized the strong presence of laypeople and perceived push towards democratizing the church. The Catholic Telegraph wrote that "a significant number of participants ... seem more determined to dictate terms to the Holy Spirit than to listen to His prompting". Political analyst and author George Weigel described the synod as "Overhyped, Overmanaged, Underwhelming" and possessing a "Catholic Lite agenda", while praising minor aspects.

=== Secular ===
The Synod's final recommendations for the Catholic church would receive criticism for the way they significantly lacked more equity for women. Despite calling for more women to have leadership roles, the issue of female ordination for roles such as deacons would be taken off the table. In addition to criticism of over the lack of progress for the issue of female deacons, the Synod was also criticized for its failure to make progress on the Catholic Church's LGBTQ+ outreach.

Despite being previously hailed as a major event for reform, The New York Times described the Synod as only "comparable to a mini version" of the 1960s Second Vatican Council.

== See also ==
- Synod of Bishops in the Catholic Church
- Fifteenth Ordinary General Assembly of the Synod of Bishops
- Fourteenth Ordinary General Assembly of the Synod of Bishops
- Synodal Way
