= Conciliar =

Conciliar may refer to:

- Conciliarity, conciliar authority
- Conciliarism, a movement in Roman Catholicism emphasising conciliarity
