= Episcopalis communio =

2018 apostolic constitution of Pope Francis

Episcopalis communio Latin for 'Episcopal Communion' Apostolic constitution of Pope Francis
- Signature date: 15 September 2018
- Text: In English

Episcopalis communio (Episcopal Communion) is an apostolic constitution promulgated by Pope Francis on September 15, 2018. It takes note of the various organizations used during the previous Synod of Bishops, and defines that its final document "participates in the ordinary magisterium."

== Background and publication ==
Episcopalis communio is presented as the logical implementation of the apostolic exhortation Evangelii gaudium, Francis' programmatic letter for his pontificate, where Francis expressed his intention "to profoundly reshape all the ecclesial structures, so that they become more missionary". The synod of bishops must be a means of collegiality and "always become more and more an adequate channel for the evangelization of the present world more than for self-preservation." Francis had previously held synods on the family (2014, 2015) and on youth (2018), and promulgated Episcopalis communio after the regional synod on the Pan-Amazon region (2019). Some analysts surmise that the greatest achievement of Francis' papacy may be his creation of a more synodal Catholic church, where synods serve as a platform for open and energetic debate.

Episcopalis communio was signed on September 15 by Pope Francis and promulgated three days later. According to Cardinal Lorenzo Baldisseri, this date recalls the creation of the Synod of Bishops in 1965 by Pope Paul VI.

== Content ==
According to the secretary of the synod council Fabio Fabene, one of the main characteristics of synods under Francis is "to listen as much as possible to reality and people," with in particular the organization of preliminary inquiries. The new constitution provides for the laity to send their contributions directly to the synod's secretary general. The document also specifies the work which must be carried out after the synod, and provides for the possibility of a pre-synodal meeting as for the synod of bishops on Young People, Faith, and Vocational Discernment. The constitution states that "If the Roman Pontiff has granted deliberative power to the Synod Assembly, [...] the Final Document participates in the Ordinary Magisterium of the Successor of Peter once it has been ratified and promulgated by him."
