= Conciliarity =

Support for authority of church councils

Conciliarity is the adherence of various Christian communities to the authority of ecumenical councils and to synodal church governance. It is not to be confused with conciliarism, which is a particular historical movement within the Catholic Church. Different churches interpret conciliarity in different ways.

== Catholic Church ==
The government of the Catholic Church is essentially monarchical, both on a papal and episcopal level. Catholic doctrine does regard ecumenical councils as legitimate but extraordinary sources of authority. They can only be called by a pope. A pope can prorogue a council (as Pius IX prorogued the First Vatican Council in 1871). If a pope dies in the middle of a council the council immediately loses its source of authority. His successor must renew the council, as happened when Pope Paul VI succeeded Pope John XXIII in 1963, when the Second Vatican Council was sitting.

The decisions of an ecumenical council do not become authoritative until approved by the pope. Popes are not bound by the decisions of ecumenical councils, nor by the mandate to implement a council's decisions. However, since the decrees of an ecumenical council are regarded as expressing the mind of the Church and of Jesus Christ, a pope would not normally ignore a council. The decisions of ecumenical councils, approved by the pope, are binding upon all the clergy and laity, subject to papal regulation.

Lesser councils also play a part in the governance of the Catholic Church. The Synod of Bishops is an assembly of bishops which advise the pope in the government of the Church. On a national level, there is the episcopal conference, regulating national issues. These conferences do not, however, exercise authority over particular dioceses.

== Eastern Orthodox churches ==
Churches of the Eastern Orthodox communion view ecumenical councils as the supreme norm of government.

== Protestant churches ==
Protestant communities tend to deny or downplay the authority of ecumenical councils, though many do adhere to synodal government. This is not the case with Anglicans; the authority of the ecumenical councils is more firmly recognized by Anglo-Catholics (high-church Anglicans).

== See also ==
- College of Bishops
- Episcopal polity
- Synodality
