= Synod of Bishops =

Synod of Bishops may refer to:

- Synod of Bishops (Catholic), an advisory body for the Pope established in 1965
- Synod of bishops (Orthodox), a meeting at which bishops are elected and inter-diocesan laws are established
- Synod of bishops of any church
