= Delegate (American politics) =

Individual who speaks or acts on behalf of an organization

A delegate is a person selected to represent a group of people in some political assembly of the United States.

There are various types of delegates elected to different political bodies. In the United States Congress delegates are elected to represent the interests of a United States territory and its citizens or nationals. In addition, certain US states are governed by a House of Delegates or another parliamentary assembly whose members are known as elected delegates.

Prior to a United States presidential election, the major political parties select delegates from the various state parties for a presidential nominating convention, often by either primary elections or party caucuses.

== As elected official ==
Delegate is the title of a person elected to the United States House of Representatives to serve the interests of an organized United States territory, at present only overseas or the District of Columbia, but historically in most cases in a portion of North America as the precursor to one or more of the present states of the union.

Delegates have powers similar to that of Representatives, including the right to vote in committee, but have no right to take part in the floor votes in which the full house actually decides whether the proposal is carried.

A similar mandate is held in a few cases under the style resident commissioner.

- Delegate is also the title given to individuals elected to the lower houses of the bicameral legislative bodies of Maryland, Virginia and West Virginia.
- Members of other parliamentary assemblies, such as the Continental Congress or the New York State Constitutional Convention.
- Members of a body charged with writing or revising a foundational or another basic governmental document (such as members of a constitutional convention are usually referred to as "delegates").

== Presidential conventions ==
=== Democratic Party ===
The Democratic Party uses pledged delegates and unpledged delegates (generally known as superdelegates or sometimes as automatic delegates), a combined system which had been introduced in 1984. Between 1984 and 2016, a candidate for the Democratic nomination had to win a majority of combined delegate votes at the Democratic National Convention.

Pledged delegates are elected or chosen at the state or local level, with the understanding that they will support a particular candidate at the convention. Pledged delegates are, however, usually not legally bound to vote for that candidate, thus the candidates are allowed to periodically review the list of delegates and eliminate any of those they feel would not be supportive. Currently there are 4,051 pledged delegates.

Of the 4,765 total Democratic delegates, 714 (approximately 15%) are superdelegates, which are usually Democratic members of Congress, governors, former presidents and former congressional and party leaders, as well as all current members of the Democratic National Committee and at times additionally added delegates (which had in fact enlarged the percentage of superdelegates towards 20% in the 2000s). They are not required to indicate preference for a candidate. Since 2018, the rules and bylaw committee of the party decided to change the rules so that superdelegates would not get a vote on the first ballot unless the outcome was certain.

The Democratic Party uses a proportional representation to determine how many delegates each candidate is awarded in each state. A candidate must win at least 15% of the vote in a particular contest or in a district of that contest in order to receive any delegates. Pledged delegates are awarded proportionally on both statewide and district level. So it is possible for candidates to win delegates even if they receive fewer than 15% of overall votes in a state provided they receive more than 15% in a particular district. There is no process to win superdelegates, since they can vote for whomever they please, but until 2016 a candidate needed to win a simple majority of total delegates to earn the Democratic nomination. However, it had been a usual campaign strategy to negotiate with as many superdelegates as possible to get their non-binding public endorsement and win a psychologically or even mathematically important numeral advantage by counting their awaited vote into one's delegate numbers. There have even been presidential nominations in the past, which had been ultimately decided by such superdelegate endorsements.

=== Republican Party ===
The Republican Party utilizes a similar system with slightly different terminology, employing bound and unbound delegates (also known as automatic delegates, but rarely as superdelegates, as their influence is much smaller compared to those in the Democratic Party). Of the total 2,472 Republican delegates, most are bound delegates who, as with the Democratic Party, are elected at the state or local level. To become the Republican Party nominee, the candidate must win a simple majority of 1,276 of the 2,472 total delegates at the Republican National Convention.

The Republican Party has fewer unbound delegates than the Democrats do. The people who get unbound status mostly are the members of the Republican National Committee, three from each state, which are the party chair and two additional committee members elected to the committee by the state convention, one committeeman and one committeewoman. This means that unbound delegates are mainly just 168 of the total number of delegates. As the Republican Party in difference to the Democratic Party puts few national rules on how to organize the state contests and the state parties have large freedom to decide over their delegate selection process, there are also very few contests, territorial in particular and in a few states, which reserve the option to let all of their delegates or a substantial amount stay unbound until the convention, or freely declare their candidate preference binding themselves. Because of this the amount of unbound delegates is slightly higher. The state party rules ultimately decide over the status as unbound delegates, and there are also state parties that directly define their RNC members as bound delegates.

Despite their status still being part of the national party rules, unbound delegates have not retained their freedom to vote for whichever candidate they please. At the 2012 national convention, following the unusually long process to determine presumptive nominee Mitt Romney and in order to prevent a chaotic convention through a so-called "insurgency" of Ron Paul delegates (who had planned to garner public interest for Paul's minority libertarian views), the Romney campaign and the Convention Committee on Rules and Order of Business enacted several historic rule changes by a vote of 63–38, which tightened the role of unbound delegates and enabled the RNC to change the rules (by a 3/4 majority) between national conventions, without needing delegate approval. Unbound delegates from states with a primary or presidential preference vote were obliged to vote according to their state's result, and other votes were disqualified. In 2015, the RNC reiterated this decision; the unbound RNC members have since then essentially been bound to the statewide winner in the same manner as the state's at-large delegates.

Because of the freedom of the local parties over the process, the process by which delegates are awarded to a candidate varies from state to state. Many states have been using a winner-take-all system, where popular vote determines the winning candidate for that state. However, beginning in 2012 many states introduced proportional representation. While the Republican National Committee does not require a 15% minimum threshold, individual state parties have in part introduced varying thresholds.

== See also ==
- Convention (meeting)
- Delegate model of representation
- Fraternal delegates (churches and political parties)
