= Consecrator =

Bishop who makes another person into a bishop

A consecrator is a bishop who ordains someone to the episcopacy. A co-consecrator is someone who assists the consecrator bishop in the act of ordaining a new bishop.

The terms are used in the canon law of the Catholic Church, Lutheran churches, in Anglican communities, and in the Eastern Orthodox Church.

== History ==
The church has always sought to assemble as many bishops as possible for the election and consecration of new bishops. However, due to difficulties in travel, timing, and frequency of consecrations, this was reduced to the requirement that all comprovincial (of the same province) bishops participate. At the Council of Nicæa it was further enacted that "a bishop ought to be chosen by all the bishops of his province, but if that is impossible because of some urgent necessity, or because of the length of the journey, let three bishops at least assemble and proceed to the consecration, having the written permission of the absent." Consecrations by the Pope were exempt from the three bishop requirement.

The reason for the three bishop requirement was stated by St. Isidore: "[The custom] that a bishop should not be ordained by one bishop, but by all the comprovincial bishops, is known to have been instituted on account of heresies, and in order that the tyrannical authority of one person should not attempt anything contrary to the faith of the Church."

== Catholic Church ==
=== Validity ===
Although for validity, only one bishop is needed to raise a priest to the episcopacy, it remains a strict rule of the Catholic Church that there should at least two co-consecrating bishops; with the sole exemption being made in missionary countries where it is very difficult to bring three bishops together. In those cases, the Holy See allows two priests to act as assistants to the consecrator. As three bishops take part, the church is more certain of the validity of the ordination which requires only one of them for validity.

=== Principal co-consecrator ===
The term "principal co-consecrator" is used to designate the bishop who assists the principal consecrator in the ordination of a new bishop. Co-consecrators are not mere witnesses to the fact that the consecration has taken place; rather, by taking part in it, they make themselves responsible for its taking place. The consecrator and the two assistant bishops impose hands upon the head of the consecrandus saying "Accipe spiritum sanctum."

== Lutheran churches ==
In the Church of Sweden, bishops are ordained at Uppsala Cathedral with the Archbishop of Uppsala serving as the principal consecrator.

The first Lutheran bishops of Estonia and Latvia were consecrated by Nathan Söderblom, the Archbishop of Uppsala.

== Anglican Communion ==
In the Anglican Communion, the co-consecrator takes part in the consecration, so that if the principal consecrator has failed to convey the episcopate to the bishop being ordained, the episcopate can be given by the co-consecrator.

== Eastern Orthodox Church ==
In the Eastern Orthodox Church, "[t]he plurality of consecrators of a local bishop also clearly expresses conciliarity: as co-consecrators, bishops from neighbouring local churches witness to the faithfulness to the apostolic faith of the church in which the new bishop will in turn be guaranteeing this faithfulness".

The presence of the additional bishops also ensures apostolic succession.

== See also ==
- Bishop (Catholic Church)#Consecration of bishops and eparchs
