= Synodal Way =

Series of conferences of the Catholic Church in Germany

Official logo of the Synodal Path.

The Synodal Way (German: Der Synodale Weg or Synodaler Weg, sometimes translated as Synodal Path) was a series of conferences of the Catholic Church in Germany to discuss a range of contemporary religious, spiritual and theological and organizational questions concerning the Catholic Church, as well as gender issues and possible reactions to the sexual abuse crisis in the Catholic Church in Germany.

The Synodal Way commenced on 1 December 2019 and finished on 11 March 2023.

== Organization ==
The conferences are seen as a three-year conversation between Catholic bishops and Christian laity, with a view to modernizing the Catholic Church in Germany.

The Synodal Way's supreme body is the Synodal Assembly. It consists of 230 members, made up of archbishops, bishops and auxiliary bishops, as well as an equal number of lay members from the Central Committee of German Catholics. This number is further increased by representatives of religious orders or other ecclesial groups.

The Synodal Way is further divided into four Synodal Forums that each focus on a particular topic:

- Power and Separation of Powers in the Church - Joint Participation and Involvement in the Mission
- Life in succeeding relationships - Living Love in Sexuality and Partnership
- Priestly Existence Today
- Women in Ministries and Offices in the Church

Proposals documents would be prepared and circulated to all the delegates. If two-thirds of the delegates voted in favour, the proposed resolutions would be passed.

An ongoing discussion is a relationship or precedence between the German Synodal Way and the international "Synod on Synodality", which was started by Pope Francis in 2021.

== Meetings ==
1. The first meeting took place from 30 January to 1 February 2020. Due to construction works in Frankfurt Cathedral the initial meeting could not convene there as originally planned and had to move to a former monastery which usually serves as a Protestant convention center.
2. The second conference took place from 30 September to 2 October 2021 but was ended prematurely before being able to vote on all proposed topics, due to too many members departing the assembly early.
3. The next conference was held from 3 to 5 February 2022 at the conference center of the Messe Frankfurt. It was the first one to decide on the results of the Synodal Way. The majority of the assembly, some of whom displayed LGBT pride flags, endorsed the following propositions:
  - Women's ordination should be allowed by the Vatican.
  - The laity should have more influence on the election of bishops.
  - Homosexual partnerships/unions should get a public blessing ceremony.
  - The Roman Catholic catechism's teachings on sexual ethics should be reformed. Homosexual sexual acts within same-sex unions/partnerships should be theologically accepted and not classified as sinful behaviour.
  - Married priests (viri probati) should be allowed.
  - There should be changes to the labour laws of the German church to prohibit the firing or refusal to hire people based on marital status.
4. A fourth conference was held on September 9, 2022. Three texts were supported; one on the position of women in the Roman Catholic Church, one entitled "New teaching over Homosexuality in Catechism of the Catholic Church" was supported, and one on reform of the Roman Catholic Church labour law for homosexual workers supported.
5. During the last meeting, from 9 to 11 March 2023 in Frankfurt, officials attended from several countries including Australia, Peru and Tanzania. They approved the blessing of same-sex unions, the normalisation of lay people preaching, a guideline of "concrete improvements for intersex and transgender faithful", and requests to reexamine the Catholic Church's stance on clerical celibacy and on women's ordination. Delegates also voted on changes to the priesthood, steps to stop abuse, safeguarding of women and institutional changes. The possibility of creating local synodal councils within parishes was due to be discussed, but was postponed by the apostolic nuncio to Germany two weeks before the meeting.

== Consequences ==
In November 2022, the Roman Catholic church in Germany reformed church labour law. Following these changes, gay priests and bishops can publicly state their sexuality, without fear of job termination. It is also no longer grounds for dismissal if an employee of the Roman Catholic church remarries or marries a same-sex partner.

Due to the decisions taken by the Synodal Way, Bishop Franz-Josef Bode, deputy chairman of the German Bishops' Conference, "invited Catholics in his diocese to contact parishes for liturgical blessings of their same-sex partnerships and other relationships regarded as morally illicit in the Catholic Church".

== Reception ==
The Synodal Way has drawn a range of criticism and support both domestically and internationally. Support came from clerics such as Italian bishop Erio Castellucci, while criticism came from clerics including Archbishop Cordileone of San Francisco.

A common topic is a perceived lack of fidelity to the established doctrines of the Catholic Church due to the refusal of the Synodal Assembly to rule out decisions that run counter to Catholic doctrines. Another common criticism concerns the legitimacy of the organization as the Synodal Way is not using an established organisational form sanctioned by canon law.

On 21 September 2019 Professor Marianne Schlosser of the University of Vienna and a member of the International Theological Commission resigned from her planned role in the Synodal Forum "Women in Ministries and Offices in the Church" citing the forum's "fixation on ordination" of women.

On 28 May 2020 Auxiliary Bishop Dominik Schwaderlapp, of the Archdiocese of Cologne resigned from his position in the Synodal Forum "Life in Successful Relationships" in protest to the forum's view on sexual morality which he claimed contradicted the Catholic Church's view as stated in the encyclical Humanae vitae.

Prior to the Regional Conferences on 4 September 2020, Bishop Rudolf Voderholzer of Regensburg criticized the conference's working papers in an open letter, dated 2 September. Points criticized included deviation from the agreed procedures, leaving the participants no room for comment prior to the conference, and perceived one-sided biblical theology of proposals.

In 2022, Bishop Georg Bätzing (chairman of the German Bishops' Conference) stated:

The Synodal Path of the Church in Germany neither seeks a schism nor leads to a national church. Whoever speaks of schism or national church knows neither the German Catholics nor the German bishops. I am saddened by the power this word has acquired, with which one tries to deny us catholicity and the will to stay united with the universal Church.

In 2023, he noted that the synodal way is “an expression of a lively, colorful and diverse church.” Thomas Söding (president of the Central Committee of German Catholics), believed that the voting results were “not enough by a long shot”, noting that discrimination against women and non-heterosexual people in the Catholic Church was ‘’an outrage’’.

=== Roman Curia statements ===
In early September 2019, Cardinal Marc Ouellet PSS of the Roman Curia's Congregation for Bishops sent a letter to the German Bishops' Conference stating that the organizational structure chosen by the Synodal Way was invalid and could not make binding decisions about some of its key topics.

On Nov 24, 2022, the Vatican published the critiques of Cardinal Ouellet, and Cardinal Luis Ladaria Ferrer, prefect of the Dicastery for the Doctrine of the Faith.

Ouellet, after praising the seriousness of the Germans in tackling sexual abuse, referred to "serious difficulties from an anthropological, pastoral, and ecclesiological point of view" in the proposals of the Germans. He said they were making "concessions" under "very strong cultural and media pressure". It is striking, however, that the agenda of a limited group of theologians from a few decades ago has suddenly become the majority proposal of the German episcopate." "It is difficult to avoid the impression that the extremely serious matter of the abuse cases has been exploited to push through other ideas not directly related to it." These are "proposals that openly contradict the teaching affirmed by all the popes since the Second Council of the Vatican."

Ladaria warned the Germans of "reducing the mystery of the Church to a mere institution of power, or viewing the Church from the outset as a structurally abusive organization that must be brought under the control of superintendents as quickly as possible." "In this respect, the greatest danger of many operative proposals of the synodal way's texts is that one of the most important achievements of the Second Vatican Council is lost, namely the clear teaching of the mission of the bishops and thus of the local Church."

On 23 October 2023, Cardinal Secretary of State Pietro Parolin reiterated that any dialogue between the Holy See and the Catholic Church in Germany cannot and will not change Catholic doctrine over the ordination of women and Church's teaching toward homosexuality.

=== Papal response ===
On 29 June 2019, Pope Francis wrote a letter "To the Pilgrim People of God in Germany". The letter supported synodal deliberations but also called for a focus on evangelization rather than pure reorganization. Attempts by some German bishops to redirect the Synodal Way towards "evangelization" were declined.

During a general audience held on 25 November 2020, Pope Francis commented on people gathering in "a Synodal path" and warned that they were lacking the Holy Spirit. While not directed officially at the Synodal Way, the statement was widely considered to refer to Germany.

On 21 July 2022, the Holy See released an announcement stating that "The 'Synodal Way' in Germany does not have the power to compel bishops and the faithful to adopt new forms of governance and new orientations of doctrine and morals".

In January 2023, in an interview with Associated Press, Pope Francis warned that the German Synodal Way is both "elitist" and "ideological." He also said that it is neither helpful nor serious, and contrasted it with the worldwide Synod on Synodality. He urged that the Church "be patient, dialogue and accompany these people on the real synodal path" and to "help this more elitist [German] path so that it does not end badly in some way, but so is also integrated into the church."

In a 10 November 2023 letter to four German Catholic laypeople, who withdrew from the synodal way in protest at its direction, the pope said he shared concerns that elements in the local Church were taking steps “to steer it increasingly away from the universal Church’s common path”.

In a letter on 16 February 2024, the Vatican instructed German bishops that they are not allowed to vote on the establishment of a democratic organ of the German Church, which would allow lay persons authority in discussion on faith and morals.

== Future of the Synodal Way ==
At the final meeting in March 2023, a transitionary Synodal committee of 74 people was set up. This committee is due to last for three years and will work on the establishment of a permanent German synodal council. In April 2025, German Roman-Catholic bishop conference published a manual for blessing ceremonies for same-sex unions.

== See also ==
- Synod on Synodality
- Synodality
