= Collegiality in the Catholic Church =

Pope governs in collaboration with bishops

In the Catholic Church, collegiality refers to "the Pope governing the Church in collaboration with the bishops of the local Churches, respecting their proper autonomy." In the Early Church, popes sometimes exercised moral authority rather than administrative power, and that authority was not exercised extremely often; regional churches elected their own bishops, resolved disputes in local synods, and only felt the need to appeal to the Pope under special circumstances.

== Historical development ==
During the eleventh and twelfth centuries, the papacy amassed considerable power, as monastic reformers saw it as a way to counter corrupt bishops while bishops saw it as an ally against the interference of secular rulers. As early as the fourteenth century, opposition to this centralization of papal authority had developed, with Bishop Guillaume Durand proposing at the Council of Vienne that local hierarchies and regional synods be strengthened. This opposition to centralization was tested when a group of cardinals, allied with secular rulers, called a council to resolve the Great Schism of the Western Church (1378 – 1417), in which several rivals had claimed to be pope. The Councils of Pisa and Constance claimed authority to judge the popes, deposed various claimants, and elected Pope Martin V. The Council of Constance also claimed that all Christians, including the Pope, were bound to obey councils "in matters pertaining to faith, the ending of the schism, and the reform of the church." This claim was short-lived and the conciliar movement soon ran out of steam.

The nineteenth and early twentieth centuries, a period some church historians have called the "long nineteenth century", saw a further consolidation of papal authority. In 1870 the First Vatican Council decreed the infallibility of the Pope's teachings, although during the council Cardinal Filippo Maria Guidi OP of Bologna objected that the Pope teaches in consultation with other bishops. A further addition to papal power took place in 1917, with the publication of a Code of Canon Law which gave the pope universal power to appoint bishops, ignoring the traditional principle of free election of bishops. This system of appointments, coupled with modern communications and the system of papal nuncios who could override local decisions, reduced the power of bishops and made the popes the "last absolute monarchs".

== Vatican II to 2013 ==
Bishops who objected to this recent consolidation of papal authority proposed at the Second Vatican Council to use the traditional collegial model to limit the centralizing tendencies of the Roman Curia; unlike conciliarists, who had maintained that an ecumenical council was superior to the Pope, advocates of collegiality proposed bishops only act "with and under the Peter [i.e. the Pope]" (cum et sub Petro). Collegiality became one of the principal elements of the reform agenda, and a chief point of conflict with the traditionalist minority at the Council. The reformers did not see this as undermining Church Tradition, but a return to the original practice of Peter and the Apostolic College. The traditionalist minority, however, opposed collegiality as undermining the authority of the Pope and changing the Church from "monarchical to 'episcopalian' and collegial." In 1964, the Dogmatic Constitution on the Church, Lumen gentium, set forth the general principle of the College of Bishops, which succeeds and gives continuing existence to the Apostolic College. The next year, Pope Paul VI issued a letter of his own initiative, Apostolica Sollicitudo, which established the synod of bishops, while the Council's Decree on the Pastoral Office of Bishops, Christus Dominus, established general rules for national and regional conferences of bishops, urging their formation where they did not already exist.

Since Vatican II, there has been an ongoing debate about the authority of episcopal conferences between advocates of centralization of authority in the Vatican, who play down the importance of bishops' conferences, and supporters of decentralization, who emphasize their importance. In 1998, Pope John Paul II issued the motu proprio On the Theological and Juridical Nature of Episcopal Conferences (Apostolos suos), which has been described as "probably the most important post-Conciliar papal document on episcopal collegiality." He stated how declarations of such conferences "constitute authentic magisterium" when approved unanimously by a conference; otherwise, the conference majority must seek "the recognitio of the Apostolic See", which they will not receive if the majority "is not substantial."

== Pope Francis ==
Throughout his papacy, Pope Francis (himself having twice been elected president of the Argentine Bishops' Conference) advocated for increasing the role of collegiality and synodality in the development of Church teachings. He put this concern into practice when he urged the Synod of Bishops to speak with parrhesia ("boldly") and without fear, unlike in earlier synods where officials of the Roman Curia would rule out discussion of contentious issues. A further example is the unprecedented degree to which he drew on the teaching documents of fifteen national bishops' conferences and two larger regional conferences from Latin America and Asia for his encyclical on the environment, Laudato si'. The Council of Cardinals examined the themes of synodality and the "healthy decentralisation" of the Church during its meeting in February 2016.

In September 2017, Pope Francis issued the motu proprio, Magnum principium, in which he amended the 1983 Code of Canon Law to increase the responsibility of national conferences of Bishops for liturgical translations. The change was described "as one of Pope Francis's strongest moves yet in terms of fostering greater collegiality in the Catholic Church."

In September 2018, by the apostolic constitution Episcopalis communio, Pope Francis introduced a more direct process whereby a final synodal document becomes a part of the Church's magisterium simply by receiving papal approval. The new constitution also provided for the laity to send their contributions directly to the synod's secretary general.

== See also ==
- College of Bishops
- Episcopal Conference
- Synod of Bishops (Catholic)
