= Christus vivit =

2019 apostolic exhortation of Pope Francis

Christus vivit Latin for 'Christ is alive' Apostolic exhortation of Pope Francis
- Signature date: 25 March 2019
- Subject: To young people and to the entire people of God
- Number: 4 of 7 of the pontificate
- Text: In English

Christus vivit (Christ is alive) is a post-synodal apostolic exhortation of Pope Francis, written in response to the Fifteenth Ordinary General Assembly of the Synod of Bishops, on young people, faith and vocational discernment, held from 3 to 28 October 2018.

The exhortation is addressed "to young people and to the entire people of God". The document is dated 25 March 2019, the day on which Francis signed the original Spanish text while visiting the Basilica of the Holy House of Mary in Loreto, Italy, and published on 2 April, the anniversary of the death of Pope John Paul II, who was "the first Pope to address a letter to young people in 1985 and he was the Pope who began the World Youth Days". When the text was released on 2 April, the Vatican provided translations in Italian, French, English, German, Portuguese and Arabic. Though not published in Latin, the document takes its title from the Latin translation of its incipit (opening words), rendered in the English translation as "Christ is alive". The Vatican also provided a summary of the document by Andrea Tornielli, the editorial director of the Holy See's Dicastery for Communication. The 35,000 words in the English translation are organized into 299 paragraphs in nine chapters.

Francis quoted the concluding document of the synod, discussed the problem of sexual abuse, as well as other abuses, committed by "some bishops, priests, religious and laypersons" and asked the young to participate in keeping priests true to their vows and vocations. He wrote: "If you see a priest at risk, because he has lost the joy of his ministry, or seeks affective compensation, or is taking the wrong path, remind him of his commitment to God and his people, remind him of the Gospel and urge him to hold to his course. In this way, you will contribute greatly to something fundamental: preventing these atrocities from being repeated." The document also acknowledged, among other things, the church's history of promoting male domination and clerical protection of "members of the Church" who committed "the abuse of power, the abuse of conscience, sexual and financial abuse" against women and children. The document further stated that the church had to repair its reputation with young people or risk becoming a "museum" if it did not change.
