= Collegiality =

Relationship between members of one profession

Collegiality is the relationship between colleagues, especially among peers, for example a fellow member of the same profession.

Colleagues are those explicitly united in a common purpose and, at least in theory, respect each other's abilities to work toward that purpose. A colleague is an associate in a profession or in a civil or ecclesiastical office. In a narrower sense, members of the faculty of a university or college are each other's "colleagues".

== Definitions and uses ==
=== Sociology of organisations ===
Sociologists of organizations use the word 'collegiality' in a technical sense, to create a contrast with the concept of bureaucracy. Classical authors such as Max Weber consider collegiality as an organizational device used by autocrats to prevent experts and professionals from challenging monocratic and sometimes arbitrary powers. More recently, authors such as Eliot Freidson (USA), Malcolm Waters (Australia), and Emmanuel Lazega (France) have said that collegiality can now be understood as a full-fledged ideal-type of organization. According to these authors, industrial bureaucracy was created for mass production, using hierarchy, Taylorian subordination, and impersonal interactions for coordination.

In contrast, collegiality, which historically precedes industrial bureaucracy (see partnerships already in Roman law) is used to innovate among peers, with coordination based on efforts to build consensus, collective responsibility, and personalized relationships for coordination (Lazega, 2020). This emphasis on personal relationships means that only social network analysis can identify the relational infrastructures that collegial settings rely upon for coordination and performance (for an empirical example, see Lazega, 2001; the network data, qualitative data, archival data, and scripts for the social network analysis, in this case, are available in several repositories such as https://data.sciencespo.fr/dataverse/Collegiality_Lawfirm_Network_Dataset or https://www.stats.ox.ac.uk/~snijders/siena/). However, after two centuries of bureaucratization, at least in Western societies and economies, it isn't easy to find truly collegial organizations. Collegiality can be found in collegial pockets within bureaucratic organizations (Lazega & Wattebled, 2011), and the combination of both ideal-types (bureaucracy and collegiality) has been labeled 'bottom-up collegiality', 'top-down collegiality', and 'inside-out collegiality', leading to the identification in a society of oligarchies using collegiality as organizational ratchets for self-segregation in social stratification (Lazega, 2020).

=== Politics of Switzerland ===
Collegiality is a key principle of Swiss politic. The seven‑member Federal Council governs as a collective, makes decisions by consensus or majority, and publicly defends those decisions as a unified body. The Government and Administration Organisation Act states that (article 12):

Principle of collegiality

1. The Federal Council reaches its decisions as a collegial body.
2. The members of the Federal Council shall represent the decisions of the whole.

=== Roman Republic ===
In the Roman Republic, collegiality was the practice of having at least two people in each magistracy in order to divide power among several people and check their powers, both to prevent the rise of another king and to ensure more productive magistrates. Examples of Roman collegiality include the two consuls and censors, six praetors, eight quaestors, four aediles, ten tribunes and decemviri.

Exceptions include extraordinary magistrates, dictators and the magister equitum.

=== Catholic Church ===
In the Catholic Church, collegiality refers primarily to "the Pope governing the Church in collaboration with the bishops of the local Churches, respecting their proper autonomy." This had been the practice of the early Church and was revitalized by the Second Vatican Council. One of the major changes during the Second Vatican Council was the council's encouragement of bishops' conferences and the Pope's establishment of the Synod of Bishops. From the beginning of his papacy, Pope Francis, who had twice been elected head of the Argentine Bishops' Conference, has advocated increasing the role of collegiality and synodality in the development of Church teachings.

== See also ==
- Collegium (ministry)
- Directorial system
- Social network analysis
