= Fifteenth Ordinary General Assembly of the Synod of Bishops =

Catholic committee

XVth Ordinary General Assembly of the Synod of Bishops
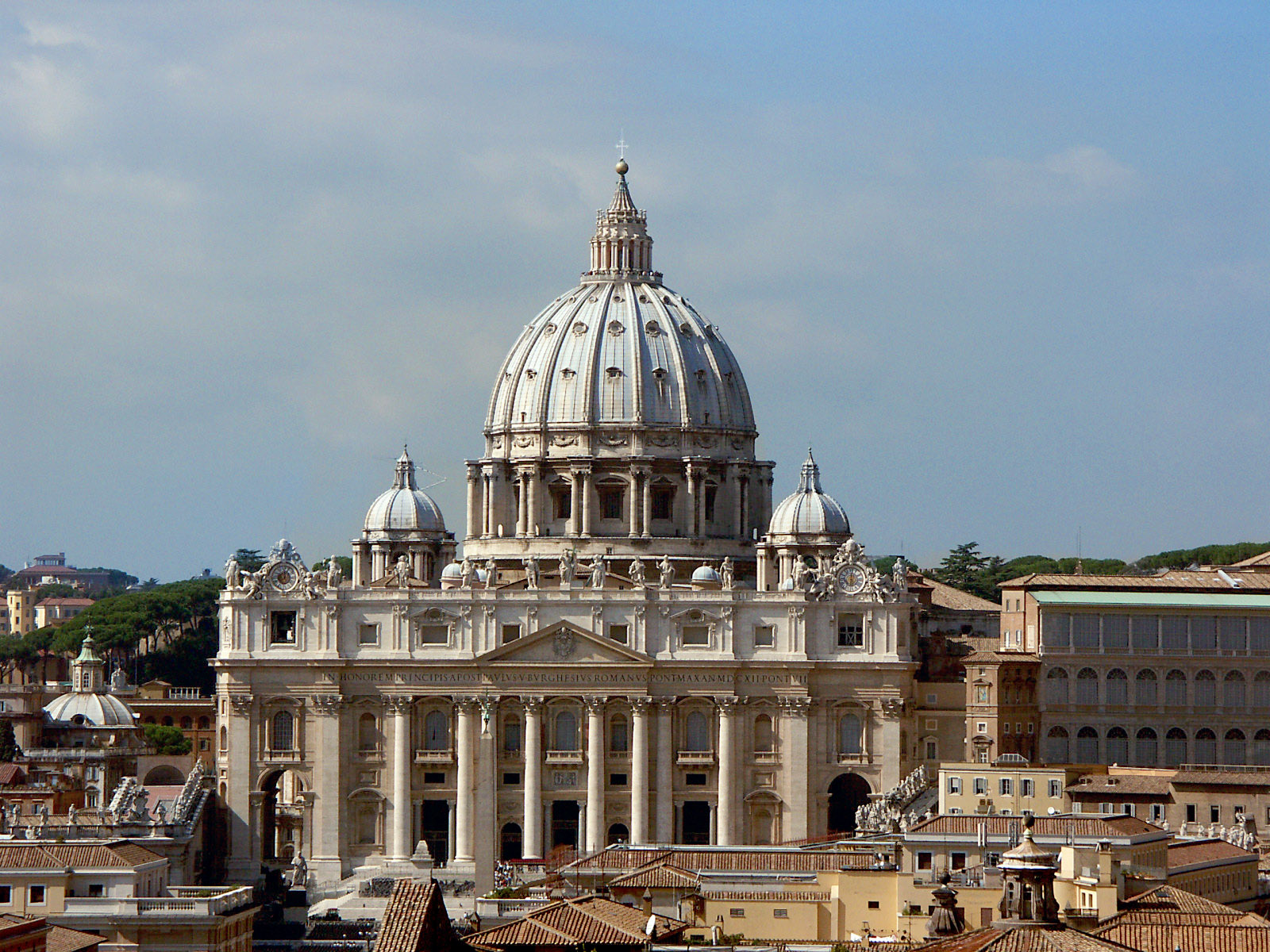
- Date: 3–28 October 2018
- Previous council: Fourteenth Ordinary General Assembly of the Synod of Bishops
- Convoked by: Pope Francis
- President: Pope Francis

The 15th Ordinary General Assembly of the Synod of Bishops, commonly referred to as the Synod on Young People, is a Roman Catholic synod that took place 3–28 October 2018 and had as its theme "Young People, Faith, and Vocational Discernment". Its aim was to "accompany young people on their way of life towards maturity so that, through a process of discernment, they can discover their life project and realize it with joy, opening the encounter with God and with men, and actively participating in the building up of the Church and society".

== Preparation ==
The theme was chosen by Pope Francis after consulting the members of the Synod Council chosen by the previous Ordinary Assembly, regional and national bishops' conferences, the Union of Superiors Generals, the leaders of the Eastern Catholic Churches, and others. The theme, according to Francis, would allow for consideration of the decline in priestly vocations along with the broader question of discerning one's vocation.

In January 2017, Pope Francis released a letter that invited "Young People" to contribute to the planning of the synod. He wrote:

A better world can be built also as a result of your efforts, your desire to change and your generosity. Do not be afraid to listen to the Spirit who proposes bold choices; do not delay when your conscience asks you to take risks in following the Master. The Church also wishes to listen to your voice, your sensitivities and your faith; even your doubts and your criticism. Make your voice heard, let it resonate in communities and let it be heard by your shepherds of souls.

In June 2017, Cardinal Lorenzo Baldisseri, Secretary General of the Synod of Bishops, announced the launch of a website to present the synod's planning document accompanied by a questionnaire in English, French, Spanish, Portuguese, German, and Italian to gather suggestions and feedback on it. He said he hoped to organize a gathering of youth in advance of the synod. Its 53 questions, mostly multiple choice, were organized into seven sections and targeted at learning about local experiences specific to the younger generation.

The planning document said that its working definition of young people meant ages 16 to 29 and that it was prioritizing communication with them: "In pastoral activity, young people are not objects but agents. Oftentimes, society sees them as nonessential or inconvenient. The Church cannot reflect such an attitude, because all young people, without exception, have the right to be guided in life's journey." The synod planning document posed another set of questions to bishops to assess how they minister to young people and included some questions targeted to specific geographic regions and asked, for example, about responding to "extreme violence" or working in a society that is "greatly secularized."

In early July, he reported that the questionnaire had received more than 60,000 responses and the website had generated 173,000 "contacts." He said he hoped to reach "all young people, not only active Catholic young people." In September, he hosted a seminar with about 20 teenagers and young adults to hear their ideas on the planned Synod. The participants were uninhibited in providing advice about topics and struggling to understand what the synod proposed to accomplish.

== Participants ==
Baldisseri announced in January 2017 that the synod auditors, attendees without voting rights, would be young men and women carefully selected to represent the entire world and would participate as key advisers throughout the process to the Pope Francis and the Synod of Bishops. These young people were:

1. Gabin Dimtooum, Chad
2. Jonathan Lewis, United States
3. Sebastian Duhau, Australia
4. Safa Al Alqoshy, Iraq
5. Vincent Nneji, Nigeria
6. Emilie Callan, Canada
7. Julian Paparella, Canada
8. Joseph Sapati Moeono-Kolio, Samoa and New Zealand
9. Yithzak Gonzalez, Panama
10. Briana Santiago, Italy
11. Briana Santiago, United States
12. Nikki Perez, Philippines
13. Father Jules Boutros, Lebanon
14. Thomas Andonie, Germany
15. Anastasia Indrawan, Indonesia
16. Oksana Pimenova, Russian Federation
17. Corina Fiore, Mexico
18. Yadira Vieyra Alvarez, United States
19. Mariano Garcia, Argentina
20. Nathaniel Lamataki, New Caledonia
21. Sister Nathalie Becquart, France
22. Gioele Anni, Italy
23. Sylvia Retamales Morales, Chile
24. Margie le Hodey, Belgium
25. Tri Minh, Vietnam
26. Daniel Bashir, Pakistan
27. Percival Holt, India
28. Cherylanne Menezes, India

Prelates assigned particular roles were:

- Relator: Cardinal Sérgio da Rocha, Archbishop of Brasilia
- Secretaries: Giacomo Costa S.J. and Rossano Sala S.D.B
- Presidents: Cardinals Louis Raphael I Sako (Iraq), Désiré Tsarahazana (Madagascar), Charles Maung Bo SDB (Myanmar), John Ribat MSC (Papua New Guinea)

The presidents alternate in presiding over the synod assemblies in place of the Pope, making assignments and managing the proceedings as necessary.

Pope Francis appointed 29 prelates to supplement those elected by national and regional episcopal conferences.

== Working document ==
The working document (instrumentum laboris) that guided the bishops' discussions was released in June 2018. It was intended to provide an overview of situations young people between 16 and 29 are facing around the world. It was developed after hearing from young people and bishops conferences. It states that "Young people feel a lack of harmony with the Church" and "It seems that we don't understand the vocabulary, and therefore also the needs, of the young."

Throwaway culture, a special concern of Pope Francis, was discussed, as was death, corruption, war, and drug-trafficking. The document also lists friendship, fake news, and video games as topics along with migration and disabilities. Ecumenism and interreligious dialogue will also be discussed. The document discusses the challenges and opportunities the internet presents. The Church can reach young people through social media, it states, but it is also critical of video games and the way they "mold in young people a debatable vision of the human being and the world, nourishing a relational style based on violence." It also highlights many of their positive features, including a desire to be involved in civic life, protection of the environment, and a desire to root out corruption and discrimination.

The synod took up young people's sexuality, including precocious sexuality, sexual promiscuity, digital pornography, the exhibition of one's body online, and sexual tourism, as "risk disfiguring the beauty and depth of emotional and sexual life". The concerns of gay youth "who, above all, want to remain close to the Church," was a special concern. In the responses to the surveys, many LBGT youth said they wish to "‘benefit from a greater closeness' and experience greater care from the Church." The document also insisted that the Church must be open and welcoming to all, including LGBT Catholics, those of other faiths, and those of no faith at all. Secretary General Lorenzo Baldisseri said at the release of the instrumentum that the Church is making an effort to engage the LGBT community because "we are open. We don't want to be closed in on ourselves." The working document also acknowledges that "controversial issues," such as contraception, abortion, homosexuality, cohabitation, and marriage, are a "source of debate among youth, both inside the Church and in society." While some find the Church's teaching to be a "source of joy," those who differ from Church teaching's on these issues "still want to continue to be part of the Church and demand more clarity on it." As a result, the synod fathers were asked to "confront, in a concrete way, controversial arguments such as homosexuality and the issues of gender, over which the young already argue with freedom and with no taboo." The synod will also discuss the challenges the Church sometimes has in explaining the Church's teaching on sexuality to contemporary society. Saying that "No bishops' conference offers solutions or recipes", the document says that "the question of sexuality must be discussed more openly and without prejudice."

Research cited in the document shows that young people face discrimination because of their gender, social class, religious affiliation, sexual orientation, geographical position, disability, or ethnicity. Young people also "report the persistence of religious discrimination, especially against Christians."

The instrumentum reported that the surveys called for a Church that is "committed to justice," willing to discuss the role of women, that has homilies that are more relevant to their lives and their discernment, and a liturgy that is "alive and close" to them. The church must accompany young people in their lives, the document states, as education and evangelization are an "ecclesial duty and a right of each young person."

Young people reported that the Church can often seem distant, and desire a Church that is close, transparent, and up to date. The Church is also being called to listen to youth, according to the document, and to discuss difficult issues.

The working document stated that scandals in the Church and society, as well as a perception that "many times the Church seems to be too severe and often associated to an excessive moralism," are causing young people to leave the Church. The document acknowledges these "serious and respectable reasons," and that too often the young have been assigned a "passive role within the Christian community." Young people report wanting a more active role in the leadership of the church.

=== Committees ===
On 3 October, Synod members representing a wide range of views were elected to serve on the synod's "Information Committee", which controls the release of information to the press and public. Each of five regions held its own election: America, Africa, Asia, Europe and Oceania. (Note: Members included: Paolo Ruffini, head of the Secretariat for Communications and Antonio Spadaro, Cardinal Gérald Lacroix, Wilfrid Fox Napier, Christoph Schönborn, Luis Antonio Tagle, and Anthony Fisher. Cardinal Robert Sarah was elected but declined for "personal reasons".) A second election on 9 October, again by region, chose members of the committee responsible for drafting the synod's concluding document. This election, again by region, produced a less diverse group more attuned to Francis in style and views, though when Francis made three additional appointments as the rules provided he avoided figures who are controversial for their espousal of less traditional views and instead used his selections to provide other kinds of diversity: the head of the Ukrainian Greek Catholic Church, a Cuban priest, and a junior Vatican official. (Note: Those elected were Cardinals Carlos Aguiar Retes, Peter Turkson, and Oswald Gracias, and Archbishops Bruno Forte and Peter Comensoli. Two more members served ex officio, Cardinals Baldisseri, and da Rocha, and others by papal appointments: Father Alexandre Awi Mello, Archbishop Sviatoslav Shevchuk, and Father Eduardo Gonzalo Redondo.)

== Final document ==
=== Apostolic exhortation ===
==== Drafting ====
Cardinal Oswald Gracias, a member of the drafting committee for the final synod document, told news outlet Crux that there had been some "resistance" among the synod fathers to the prominent inclusion of the themes of "synodality" and "discernment" in the draft final document because these themes "really were not very much prominent in the discussions." "It wasn't very prominent in the minds of the synod fathers, but it's come out very strongly," Gracias stated. Gracias speculated that Cardinal Lorenzo Baldisseri and the two special secretaries for the synod, Father Giacomo Costa and Father Rossano Sala, were responsible for the insertion of the themes.

==== Christus Vivit ====
Drawing on the synod's document on discussions, Pope Francis authored an apostolic exhortation, Christus Vivit (Christ is living), which he signed on 25 March 2019. The text of the document was published on 2 April 2019, the anniversary of the death of Pope John Paul II, who was "the first Pope to address a letter to young people in 1985 and he was the Pope who began the World Youth Days". The Vatican also provided a summary of Christus Vivit by Andrea Tornielli.

Francis acknowledged the church's history of promoting male domination and clerical protection of members of the Church who committed the abuse of power, the abuse of conscience, sexual and financial abuse against women and children. He wrote that the church had to repair its reputation with young people or risk becoming "a museum". He also acknowledged abuses committed "by some bishops, priests, religious and laypersons" and asked young people to hold priests accountable by reminding them of their vows and vocations.

The Apostolic Exhortation included several references to the work of the Auditors who provided key advice and played a pivotal role during this process, including a quote from the Samoan auditor Joseph Sapati Moeono-Kolio which Pope Francis used to summarise Chapter Six:

During the Synod, one of the young auditors from the Samoan Islands spoke of the Church as a canoe, in which the elderly help to keep on course by judging the position of the stars, while the young keep rowing, imagining what waits for them ahead. Let us steer clear of young people who think that adults represent a meaningless past, and those adults who always think they know how young people should act. Instead, let us all climb aboard the same canoe and together seek a better world, with the constantly renewed momentum of the Holy Spirit.

== See also ==
- Synod of Bishops in the Catholic Church
- Fourteenth Ordinary General Assembly of the Synod of Bishops
- Sixteenth Ordinary General Assembly of the Synod of Bishops
