= Instrumentum laboris =

An instrumentum laboris (Latin for 'working instrument') is a type of Vatican official document used at a General Assembly of the Synod of Bishops. The first such document was drafted for the Synod on evangelization in 1974.

The instrumentum laboris is based on responses to the Lineamenta, an introduction and outline of the subject for discussion which is sent to all Episcopal Conferences, Eastern Churches, Departments of the Curia and the Union of Superiors General before an assembly of bishops. Responses to the Lineamenta are sent to the General Secretariat, who then organizes the submissions to determine the primary discussion points of the assembly. He then drafts the instrumentum laboris as a guide to the discussion, incorporating the input received from the Lineamenta along with the teachings of the Church on the subject and any other relevant material. The document is then approved by the Pope, translated as necessary, and sent to the bishops assembled for the Synod. The assembled bishops will discuss the contents, and are free to modify or even rewrite it completely over the course of the Synod. The document may also be published for reading by the general public.

The instrumentum laboris is not an indicator of what the conclusions of the Synod will be, but can give an idea of the general consensus in the Church on the subject of discussion. Pope John Paul II stated that the document was "a sign and builder of communion, [since] it expresses the voice of the Church, and at the same time it fosters an exchange which enriches that voice in the common task".

Due to talks at Vatican II, the majority of bishops present agreed that the instrumentum laboris was essential for the life of the church.
