= Fraternal party =

A fraternal party is a political party officially affiliated with another, often larger or international, political party or governmental party, or several of them, notably when these share a political ideology.

They may express this 'fraternity' by exchanging fraternal delegates to each-other's party congresses.

In 1960s, communist parties in charge of states often had fraternal parties in other countries than the one(s) in which they were organized. A major example was the Chinese Communist Party, which exercised enormous influence over the New Left and New Communist Movement of the 1960s and 1970s. In The Modern History Sourcebook, there is a 1964 statement by the Romanian Workers' Party in which they caution, "In discussing and confronting different points of view on problems concerning the revolutionary struggle or socialist construction, no party must label as anti-Marxist, anti-Leninist the fraternal party whose opinions it does not share."

== Examples ==
- The European Social Democratic Party (PSDE) from Moldova and the Social Democratic Party of Croatia (SDP).
- The American Communist Party (ACP), the Workers' Cause Party (PCO) from Brazil, and the Patriotic Party (VP).

== See also ==
- Fellow traveller
- Communist International
- Bloc party – Political party that is a constituent of an electoral bloc
