= College of Bishops =

Collection of bishops in communion with the Pope

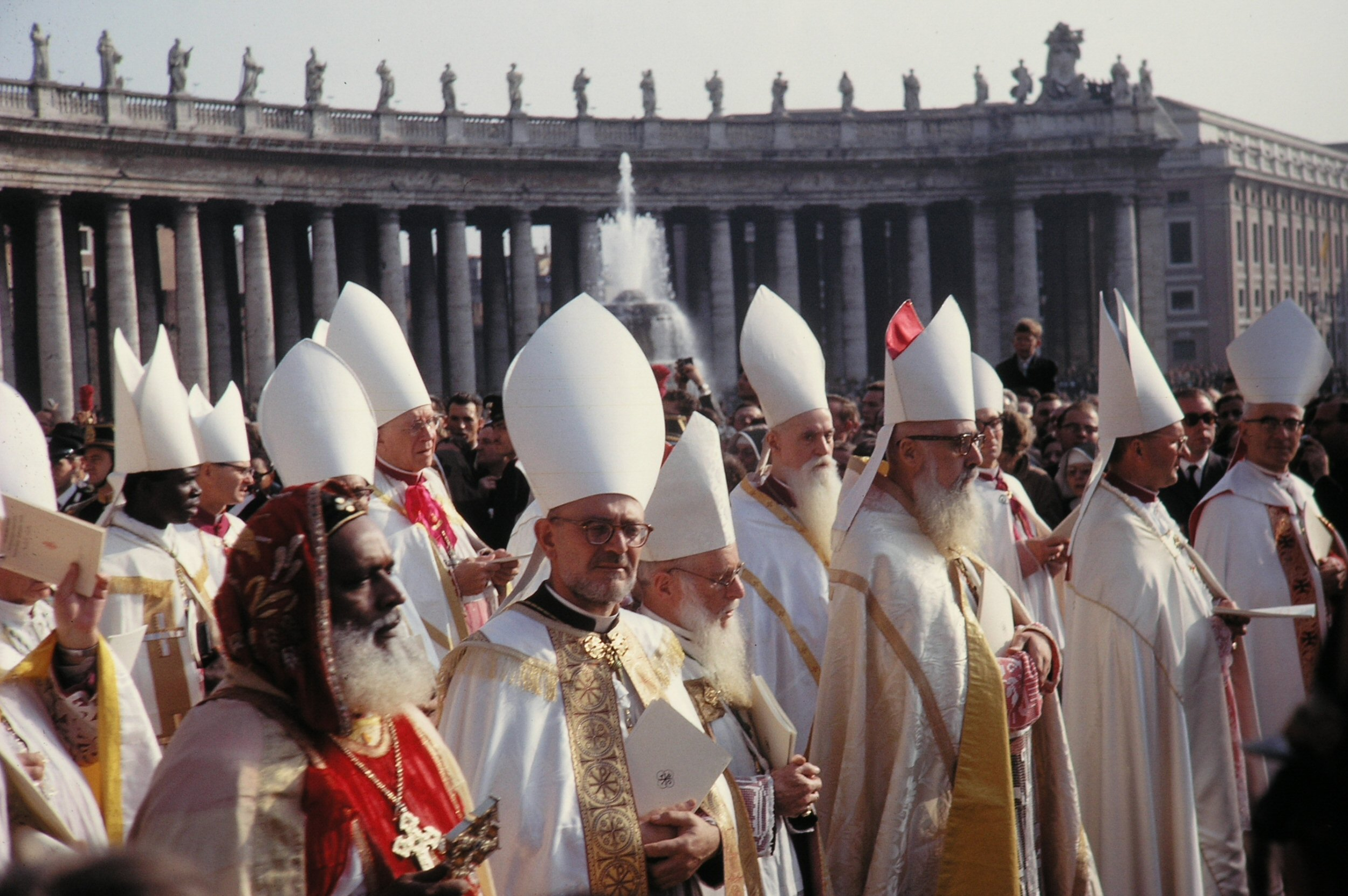
Council bishops on Saint Peter's Square, 1961

In the Catholic Church, the College of Bishops, also known as the Ordo of Bishops, is the collection of those bishops who are in communion with the Pope (see Glossary of the Catholic Church). Under canon law, a college is a collection (Latin collegium) of persons united together for a common object so as to form one body. The Bishop of Rome (the Pope) is the head of the college.

== Authority of the college of bishops ==
In Catholic teaching, the college of bishops is the successor to the college of the apostles. While the individual members of the college of bishops are each directly responsible for pastoral care and governance in their own particular Church, the college as a whole has full supreme power over the entire Church:

The college of bishop head is the Supreme Pontiff [the Bishop of Rome] and whose members are bishops by virtue of sacramental consecration and hierarchical communion with the head and never without this head, is [also] the subject of supreme and full power over the universal church.

The college exercises this supreme and full power in a solemn manner in an ecumenical council, but also through united action even when not gathered together in one place.

By present-day canon law it is for the Pope to select and promote the ways in which the bishops are to act collegially, such as in an ecumenical council, and it is for him to convoke, preside over (personally or by his delegates), transfer, suspend, or dissolve such a council, and approve its decrees. The Catholic Church teaches that the college of bishops, gathered in council or represented by the Pope, may teach some revealed truth as requiring to be held absolutely and definitively (infallibly).

== Enunciation of the teaching by the Second Vatican Council ==
The Second Vatican Council enunciated the doctrine of the collegiality of bishops as follows:

Just as in the Gospel, the Lord so disposing, Saint Peter and the other apostles constitute one apostolic college, so in a similar way the Roman Pontiff, the successor of Peter, and the bishops, the successors of the apostles, are joined together. Indeed, the very ancient practice whereby bishops duly established in all parts of the world were in communion with one another and with the Bishop of Rome in a bond of unity, charity and peace, and also the councils assembled together, in which more profound issues were settled in common, the opinion of the many having been prudently considered, both of these factors are already an indication of the collegiate character and aspect of the Episcopal order; and the ecumenical councils held in the course of centuries are also manifest proof of that same character. And it is intimated also in the practice, introduced in ancient times, of summoning several bishops to take part in the elevation of the newly elected to the ministry of the high priesthood. Hence, one is constituted a member of the Episcopal body in virtue of sacramental consecration and hierarchical communion with the head and members of the body. But the college or body of bishops has no authority unless it is understood together with the Roman Pontiff, the successor of Peter as its head. The pope's power of primacy over all, both pastors and faithful, remains whole and intact. In virtue of his office, that is as Vicar of Christ and pastor of the whole Church, the Roman Pontiff has full, supreme and universal power over the Church. And he is always free to exercise this power. The order of bishops, which succeeds to the college of apostles and gives this apostolic body continued existence, is also the subject of supreme and full power over the universal Church, provided we understand this body together with its head the Roman Pontiff and never without this head. This power can be exercised only with the consent of the Roman Pontiff. For our Lord placed Simon alone as the rock and the bearer of the keys of the Church, and made him shepherd of the whole flock; it is evident, however, that the power of binding and loosing, which was given to Peter, was granted also to the college of apostles, joined with their head. This college, insofar as it is composed of many, expresses the variety and universality of the People of God, but insofar as it is assembled under one head, it expresses the unity of the flock of Christ. In it, the bishops, faithfully recognizing the primacy and pre-eminence of their head, exercise their own authority for the good of their own faithful, and indeed of the whole Church, the Holy Spirit supporting its organic structure and harmony with moderation. The supreme power in the universal Church, which this college enjoys, is exercised in a solemn way in an ecumenical council. A council is never ecumenical unless it is confirmed or at least accepted as such by the successor of Peter; and it is prerogative of the Roman Pontiff to convoke these councils, to preside over them and to confirm them. This same collegiate power can be exercised together with the pope by the bishops living in all parts of the world, provided that the head of the college calls them to collegiate action, or at least approves of or freely accepts the united action of the scattered bishops, so that it is thereby made a collegiate act.

== Unique relationship ==
The relationship between the college of bishops and the individual bishops and in particular the Bishop of Rome has no secular counterpart, and its practical consequences cannot be deduced from secular models such as the various forms of governance of a state or of a corporation.

The doctrine of the collegiality of the bishops as a body was enunciated by the Second Vatican Council which "desired to integrate all the elements which make up the Church, both the mystical and the institutional, the primacy and the episcopate, the people of God and the hierarchy, striking new notes and establishing new balances which would have to be worked out and theologized upon in the lived experience of the Church."

== See also ==
- Collegiality in the Catholic Church
- Episcopal Conference
- Infallibility of the Church
- Lumen gentium
- Synod
- Synod of Bishops (Catholic)
- United Methodist Council of Bishops
