= Lineamenta =

Catholic Church Document

A Lineamenta document is a text written in preparation for a General Assembly of the Synod of Bishops in the Roman Catholic Church.

The lineamenta encourages bishops to invite all Catholics into discussion and to take a pastoral inventory.
