= Fourteenth Ordinary General Assembly of the Synod of Bishops =

Catholic Church Synod

XIV Ordinary General Assembly of the Synod of Bishops
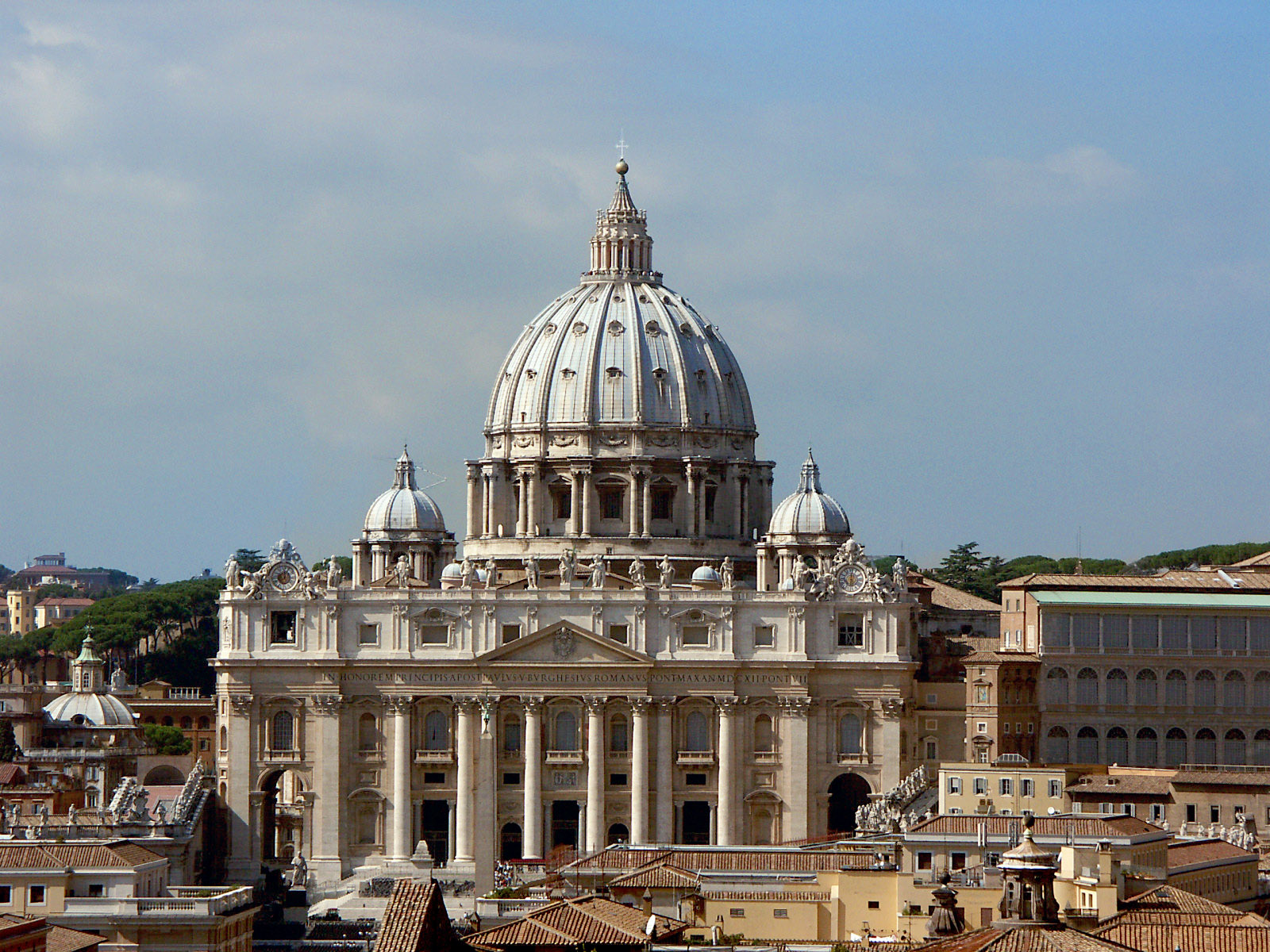
- Date: 4–25 October 2015
- Previous council: Thirteenth Ordinary General Assembly of the Synod of Bishops
- Next council: Fifteenth Ordinary General Assembly of the Synod of Bishops
- Convoked by: Pope Francis
- President: Pope Francis
- Topics: The vocation and mission of the family in the Church and in the contemporary world

The Fourteenth Ordinary General Assembly of the Synod of Bishops, popularly referred to as the Synod on the Family, took place from 4 to 25 October 2015 with the theme of "the vocation and mission of the family in the Church and in the contemporary world." It was "reflect[ing] further on the points discussed" at the 2014 Third Extraordinary General Assembly of the Synod of Bishops "so as to formulate appropriate pastoral guidelines" for the pastoral care of the person and the family. The 2014 assembly of the synod, called to define the status quaestionis (current situation) and to collect the participants' experiences and proposals, can be understood as a preparation for the 2015 assembly, but they are meant to "form a single organic unity." It took place in the Synod Hall in the Paul VI Audience Hall in Vatican City.

== Background ==
A preparatory session of the synod was held in 2014 to set the stage for the larger 2015 assembly. Called by Pope Francis, it was meant to "continue the reflection and journey of the whole Church, with the participation of leaders of the Episcopate from every corner of the world," and to be the first of "two stages, forming a single organic unity" with the 2015 assembly.

Pope Francis described the 2014 assembly by saying that none of the Synod Fathers "questioned the fundamental truths of the Sacrament of Matrimony, namely: indissolubility, unity, fidelity, and openness to life. This was not touched." He added, however, that there was a difference between doctrine and discipline. While not mentioning Communion specifically, he said that the Church should "open the doors a bit more" and allow divorced and remarried Catholics to participate in the life of the Church.

Cardinal Christoph Schönborn, a participant in the 2014 session, compared the discussions at the Synod to a situation in which a mother says: "Watch out, be careful", and the father says: "No, that's fine, go ahead." Francesco Miano, a lay participant, said there was a tension between truth and mercy.

Pope Francis said that the media coverage of the 2014 Synod "was often somewhat in the style of sports or political chronicles: often there was talk of two teams, for and against, conservatives and progressives." He added that "there was no clash between factions, as in a parliament where this is licit, but [instead] a discussion between bishops."

The fifth ordinary session of the Synod of Bishops, held in 1980, was the last held on the topic of the family. It resulted in the Apostolic Exhortation Familiaris Consortio. According to Cardinal Lorenzo Baldisseri, Secretary General of the Synod of Bishops, the "social framework has completely changed" since that time. He added that "there are new situations that must be faced, not avoided.... Some of these situations never occurred before; they need a doctrinal deepening and pastoral courage to find proper solutions, always respecting truth and charity."

=== Preparation ===
An extraordinary consistory of the cardinals took place in February 2014. It began with a speech by cardinal Walter Kasper; this speech served as basis for discussions at the Synods of Bishops on the Family.

The synod's ordinary council met on 19–20 November 2014, to begin planning for the 2015 Synod. At the meeting they discussed publishing daily summaries of bishops' remarks so as to avoid confusion and allow for transparency. They also discussed making the committee which will draft the synod's report "more representative of the world" than was the case at the 2014 assembly.

Baldisseri said the time in between the two sessions is "the most important." A lay-led novena of Eucharistic adoration took place on the first Thursday of each month for the nine months leading up to the synod.

In addition to the report on the 2014 session, a questionnaire for the laity was distributed to bishops conferences, the Synods of Eastern Catholic Churches, the Union of Religious Superiors, and the dicasteries of the Roman Curia around the world on 9 December 2014. Together they form a preparatory document for the synod, known in Latin as a lineamenta. In addition to the laity questionnaire, study groups were assembled in Rome to consider "the most sensitive issues," especially homosexuality and admitting divorced and remarried Catholics to the Eucharist.

The statement accompanying the lineamenta asked bishops to conduct "an in-depth examination of the work initiated" at the 2014 session, and to avoid "starting over from zero." It also "stressed the need for mercy in responding to such difficult situations – even asking the bishops to avoid basing their pastoral care solely on current Catholic doctrine." The lineamenta included numerous quotations from Francis' apostolic exhortation Evangelii gaudium, with a particular emphasis on mercy and on being a church that goes to the peripheries of society.

The council of the Synod of Bishops met with Pope Francis from 25–26 May 2015 to review the responses received. The synod's general secretary reviewed them all, and incorporated them into a document that was used for the 2015 assembly. Pope Francis also gave a series of catechetical sessions with the theme of the family in 2014 and 2015.

==== Questionnaire for the laity ====
The 46 questions in the lineamenta covered many of the same topics as the questionnaire sent out in advance of the 2014 Synod. They asked about "all aspects of the promotion of authentic family values, the training of clergy in family ministry, the way the Church can be more present among those living far away from the Christian faith, and the care of families that are wounded and fragile." "How would it have been possible to talk about the family without engaging families, listening to their joys and hopes, their pain and anxieties?" Pope Francis asked.

Questions about same-sex marriage, divorce and remarriage, contraception, and cohabitation outside marriage were included, but "the wording was designed to make clear that the basics of Catholic doctrine aren't in doubt." The Canadian Conference of Catholic Bishops stressed that the questionnaire is a way for gather pastoral insights, but not a survey or poll of the opinion of Catholics.

The questionnaire was divided into three sections based on the final report of the 2014 assembly. Catholics "at all levels," including "particular churches and academic institutions, organizations, lay movement and other ecclesial associations," were invited to participate. A few days before the questionnaire was released, Pope Francis had implored theologians to listen to the faithful, and to "open their eyes and ears to the signs of the times." It has been said that Pope Francis "has been listening to the faithful and trying to break through any ecclesiastical shells that can form around the curia. His desire to consult with not just with bishops but also the lay faithful, on these important family matters on how we can support family life and reach out and show support, is quite striking."

Baldisseri called for Catholic lay movements to help suggest solutions to the issues facing family life in the modern world, and to help to care for those families which are broken or wounded. Mike Phelan, director of the Office of Marriage and Respect Life for the Diocese of Phoenix, said the purpose of the survey was to determine what the Church needs to do "to support families that are deeply broken and deeply suffering," adding that "We need to be radically creative with how we go to where families actually are. So many families hurting, and how do we actually reach out to them?"

The surveys were to be returned by 15 April 2015, so that the results could be included in the working document for the 2015 session of the synod, known as the Instrumentum laboris. The synod office sent them directly to dioceses, but the responses were to be funneled back to Rome through episcopal conferences. Dioceses may also use the responses in their own planning processes.

===== Adaptations =====
The synod office asked that the lineamenta, including the questionnaire, not be "altered in any way." Despite this, many dioceses, parishes, and other groups did so. (Note: For a list of how US dioceses collected information, the National Catholic Reporter has produced a map.)

It was estimated to take between two and five hours to answer all the questions in the original. Translation from the original Italian also changed the syntax of the questions, making a clear understanding more difficult. Given the length and complexity of the questions, some bishops counseled that respondents "are not expected to answer all of the questions" and requested that they focus on those most important or pertinent to them.

====== Diocesan adaptations ======
The Canadian Conference of Catholic Bishops offered a rewritten version to "more easily facilitate any consultations dioceses may undertake," and the Archdiocese of Boston condensed the 46 original questions into six broader questions. They also created a website for the synod, www.Synod2015.org, with videos for each of the six broad questions and other resources.

The Archdiocese of Philadelphia received very few responses to the questionnaire, which was published as originally transmitted from the Vatican. The neighboring Diocese of Camden, on the other hand, "took the whole thing apart" and "translated it into [understandable] English," and received a much higher response rate.

Some bishops, such as William Medley of the Diocese of Owensboro, held town hall meetings with local Catholics to get their opinions on the issues raised in the lineamenta. The Southern African Catholic Bishops’ Conference placed their own questionnaire online with questions that are particular to African families, such as the problem of child-headed families.

The Bishops' Conference of France's Family and Society Council prepared a theological analysis of single Catholics, a demographic they say was overlooked by the 2014 assembly of the synod.

====== Other adaptations ======
The Association of U.S. Catholic Priests sent the questionnaire to their members, asking members to rank the questions in order of importance, and to answer those they felt were the most important. They later extended the invitation to all priests in the United States.

The group Catholic Church Reform International produced a 20 question "alternate" survey, saying that "the [original] questionnaire is far too complex and, with its abstract language and juridical views of marriage, it is largely incomprehensible to even the most well educated Catholics." Call to Action called the language of the questionnaire "hard to get into" and released their own version that was not as "prescriptive" as that the simplified version produced by the bishops of England and Wales.

===== Responses =====
In France, over 10,000 responses were received. Germans believed that the questions focused too heavily on an idealized version of the family, and not one that reflected the lived experience of most German Catholics. The 17-page report from the German bishops conference, which summarized over 1,000 pages of responses, said the questionnaire lacked "appreciative language for relationships which neither corresponded to the Church's ideals nor were definitely orientated towards marriage and the family."

A study of the University of Münster with participants from 42 countries showed many Catholics wished for reforms of Catholic doctrines, especially regarding sexuality. The umbrella of Catholic youth work in Germany "BDKJ" released a youth friendly edition of the official questionnaire. The questionnaire was answered by about 10,000 young Catholics living in Germany. For a majority of the interviewees, premarital sex as well as contraception and birth control was compatible with their personal religious beliefs. Furthermore, a majority wished equality for homosexual partnerships and a more sympathetic treatment of divorced people.

==== Other events ====
Other family-related events took place between the 2014 and 2015 assemblies of the synod. These included the 2015 World Meeting of Families in Philadelphia which "enrich[ed] the context and reflections" of those who attended both. In addition, an interfaith conference on the "Complementarity of Man and Woman" at the Vatican was held in November 2014, and an International Conference of family and life movements was sponsored by the Pontifical Council for the Family. The European Conference on the Family had the theme "Between Two Synods: Journeying Together."

The Archdiocese of Detroit, along with Courage International and others, hosted a conference in August 2015 "exploring some of the complex challenges the Catholic Church faces in ministering to those with same-sex attraction." At the end of the conference, summaries of the speeches and presentations given were compiled in a book form and sent to the synod fathers.

In addition, a study day was held in May 2015 that brought together 50 bishops, theologians, Curia officials and a few journalists. They discussed the issues expected to be raised at the 2015 session of the synod.

=== Statements made in advance of the Synod ===
Catholic individuals and groups from around the world made statements, wrote open letters, signed petitions, and gave speeches in advance of the 2015 assembly in an effort to let their voices be heard. Rev. Federico Lombardi, director of the Holy See Press Office, said that anyone who has "any request or proposal on the synod can naturally submit it" to the Synod Secretariat.

==== From Pope Francis ====
Pope Francis said that in advance of the 2015 session of the synod, the Church "needs prayers, not gossip." He especially asked those "who feel alienated or are not accustomed to praying" to pray for the synod fathers. Regarding the hot button issues that the synod would discuss, he said that "I believe that there are disproportionate expectations," and later added that the synod fathers would work on the many difficult issues facing families. Again asking for prayers, he said he wanted Christ to "take what might seem to us impure, scandalous, or threatening, and turn it into a miracle".

Pope Francis also declared a special jubilee Year of Mercy that would begin shortly after the synod opened. This was seen by some "as a motion by Francis to focus the minds of the Synod Fathers on a 'merciful' solution for divorced and remarried Catholics."

==== From laity ====
A petition given the title of a "filial appeal" was signed by cultural conservatives around the world including Cardinal Raymond Burke, Chilean Cardinal Jorge Arturo Medina Estévez, and former U.S. presidential candidate Rick Santorum. It asked Pope Francis to reaffirm "categorically the Catholic teaching that divorced-and-civilly-remarried Catholics cannot receive holy Communion and that homosexual unions are contrary to divine and natural law." As of 5 February 2015 it had been signed by 72,000 people.

Others called for the 2015 session of the Synod to provide the faithful with "more than pious advice, like 'the family that prays together, stays together,'" and to address issues facing current realities in the West such as teens who get pregnant or impregnate another before they have the education and job skills to support children, and government policies that discourage marriage.

A group of progressive Catholic organizations called for a more diverse collection of lay members at the 2015 assembly of the synod, specifically asking for divorced and remarried people, cohabitating couples, interfaith families, impoverished families, single parents, families with lesbian, gay, bisexual or transgender members, same-sex couples, and families torn by the violence of war and abuse to be invited.

==== From clergy ====
French Archbishop Georges Pontier said Pope Francis did not want the 2015 session of the Synod to merely repeat familiar church teachings. Baldisseri commented that "We want to discuss things not in order to call things into doubt, but rather to view it in a new context and with a new awareness." He added that it would be "senseless" to hold another assembly of the Synod to just repeat existing Church teaching. Cardinal Donald Wuerl believed that "If your starting point is ‘We already have the answers,’ this process becomes difficult to deal with," and that Pope Francis "is saying, ‘We have the revelation, but we don't have the application for all times.'"

Cardinal Walter Kasper said that "a battle is going on" in the Synod Fathers' deliberations, but British Cardinal Vincent Nichols challenged that metaphor. Nichols said that it was wrong to look at it as "a battle between contesting sides. Battles have winners and losers. And often ‘collateral damage’ is the most tragic consequence of hostilities." He instead called it "a time of prayerful discernment." Argentine Cardinal Luis Villalba, a friend of Pope Francis', believed that "There are different accents, perspectives, and this is good. These might change, but doctrine will remain the same."

US Cardinal Daniel DiNardo did not believe that divorce, contraception, and homosexuality are "the most significant issues" the 2015 session of the synod will take up, but will be played up in the media. Cardinal Wilfrid F. Napier said many African bishops want to focus on the positive, and emphasize that there are good marriages and families before getting sidetracked in other issues. Baldisseri added that he hoped the 2015 assembly of the synod would "listen to couples in irregular situations."

A public letter from priests in England and Wales calling on the synod fathers not to make any changes regarding Communion for the divorced and remarried was signed by 461 priests. More than 500 members of the laity then wrote a letter to the editor of the same publication supporting the priests. Nichols responded by saying that while the opinion of the priests was important and welcome, they should not be attempting to communicate with their bishops through the press. The same statement was subsequently signed by nearly 1,000 priests in the United States, including seven bishops, three active and four retired.

===== Divorce and remarriage =====
Ho Chi Minh city's Archbishop Paul Bùi Văn Đọc called the problem of Communion for the divorced and remarried "knotty," and said the issue required striking a balance between "truth and charity." Bishop Charles Drennan from New Zealand, however, cautioned that any proposal based on mercy should not come at the expense of "the recognition of what is true." Archbishop José María Arancedo of Argentina said that "there might be an opening on the issue of the divorced and remarried." Nichols has publicly supported allowing divorced and remarried Catholics to receive Communion after completing a "demanding penitential" process.

Archbishop Charles Palmer-Buckle of Ghana supported allowing individual bishops to make decisions about divorced and remarried Catholics on a case by case basis. The Church in Africa, he said, must minister to many who were in a polygamous relationship before becoming Catholic. This position was supported by Cardinal Luis Antonio Tagle of the Philippines, who said that since "every situation for those who are divorced and remarried is quite unique" that the Church "cannot give one formula for all."

Palmer-Buckle later was quoted as saying that the Church could take a Protestant approach and use "the power of the keys" to allow individuals to remarry. He noted that the particular passage of the Bible which he was using as a justification (Matthew 16:19) had never been applied to marriage before, and said his "interpretation" was "daring."

The Canadian bishops said that the 2014 assembly of the Synod "clearly opted for a pastoral approach that accents the positive: accompaniment, mercy, and the goodness of the good news." They added that "too often the teaching of the church is understood as a set of rules imposed from without or as a code of conduct considered by many to be out of touch with modern reality." However, Polish Archbishop Henryk Hoser said that these proposals have "betrayed" the vision Pope John Paul II set forth in his 1981 apostolic exhortation, Familiaris consortio.

===== Homosexuality =====
Palmer-Buckle said he hopes the Church in Africa learns from the Church in Europe in becoming more welcoming towards homosexuals. He said he worried that "many [would] like to make the ‘voice of the media’ the ‘voice of the Church.’"

== Process ==
Saying they have put together a "new methodology" which was personally approved by Pope Francis, Vatican officials announced a few days before the opening Mass that the 2015 assembly of the synod would be run differently than those in the past. The synod was structured into three mini-ynods, one a week, for the three-week duration. In week one, the bishops discussed challenges facing the family, in week two the topic was the vocation of the family, and the final week was devoted to the mission of the family today.

Unlike at the 2014 session of the synod, a midterm report was not produced. Instead, each week began with speeches of up to 3 minutes and ended with discussions in one of 13 small groups of about 30 people, including laity, organized by language. (Note: There were four English groups, three French, Italian and Spanish groups, and one German group.) With the growing number of bishops in the world, and correspondingly the increased size of the 2015 assembly of the synod, the amount of time each was allowed to speak was reduced. Prior to 2005, each speaker could command the podium for eight minutes, and in 2008 it was reduced to five.

The Synod did not have an interim report. The small groups, which include lay men and women, elected their own chairmen and moderators. At the end of the three weeks, the bishops would vote on a final document.

The full text of each small group's report would be publicly released by the Vatican, but individual bishop's speeches would not be. Some bishops made their statements publicly available at their own initiative, and the comments of the married couples who spoke were released. Bishops used social media tools such as Facebook, Twitter, and blogs, to make points and explain happenings. Daily updates were provided to the media by participants, and a dedicated space was provided to allow the press to interview bishops.

=== Instrumentum laboris ===
The Instrumentum laboris, or working document, for the 2015 session of the synod was released on 24 June 2015. While reiterating the Church's longstanding position on marriage and sexuality, it called for a different, more welcoming way to articulate those teachings: "It is necessary to adopt a style of communication that is clear and inviting, open and not moralizing, judgmental, and controlling, which witnesses to the moral teaching of the Church while at the same time remaining sensitive to the situation of each individual person."

While describing "cultural and social crises" affecting families, the instrumentum laboris also kept open the possibility for divorced and remarried couples to return to the sacraments. It discusses bioethics, abortion, and violence against women. On the topic of homosexuals, it says they "ought to be respected in his/her human dignity and received with sensitivity and great care in both the Church and society." It added that there were no grounds to consider the unions of two members of the same gender as equal to marriages, and that it was unacceptable for international aid organizations to make acceptance of gay marriage a prerequisite for financial assistance.

Baldisseri said that the questionnaire sent to Catholics around the world was "extremely useful" in preparing the instrumentum laboris.

=== Outside organizations ===
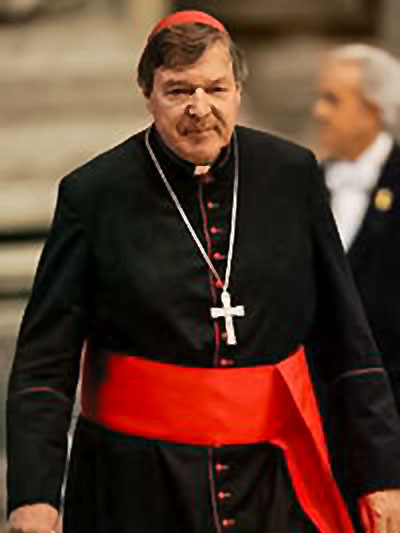
Cardinal George Pell

Catholic advocacy groups had presences in Rome, trying to influence the decisions of the synod. Gay Catholics, women theologians, and African bishops opposed to homosexuality were some of the most prominent groups lobbying the synod fathers.

Courage International and Ignatius Press sponsored an event at the Angelicum on homosexuality that featured Synod fathers Robert Sarah and George Pell. The Global Network of Rainbow Catholics also held an event that they said hoped would bring "LGBT voices to the Synod" at the Centre for Pilgrims Santa Teresa Couderc.

A conservative group, worried that there was a "pre-determined outcome that is anything but orthodox," started an online petition calling on any "faithful" bishop to "do his sacred duty and publicly retire from any further participation in the synod before its conclusion." This call for a walkout was rejected, with conservative Cardinal Pell saying that the concerns some had at the beginning of the assembly have "substantially been addressed."

== Issues ==
=== Early statements ===
Pope Francis opened the assembly with "a stirring defense of traditional marriage," while at the same time saying that the Church must be merciful and compassionate to all, including those who have fallen short of the Church's teachings. He also decried the decline of marriage, saying that it "is increasingly viewed as a quaint relic of the past." He paid particular attention to the developed world, saying those countries had the lowest birth rates and the highest percentages of abortion, divorce, and suicide, as well as social and environmental pollution.

At the opening Mass, Francis called on members of the Church to defend faithful love, the sacredness of every life, and the unity and indivisibility of marriage, but coupled that with a call for charity, and not judgement, for those who do not live up to that standard. He also said he was saddened by the lonely, and particularly the elderly, as well as widows, those abandoned by their spouse, refugees, and the youths who he said are victims of a culture of waste. He told the synod fathers that they should not be swayed by "passing fads or popular opinions."

The following day, during the first session, Francis told the bishops that the synod was not a parliament where deal-making was accepted, but that the "lone method in the synod is to listen to the voice of the Holy Spirit." He also told them that they should have apostolic courage, evangelizing humility, and trusting prayer. He warned the assembled bishops against the "hardening of some hearts, which despite good intentions keep people away from God," but also that the synod should "not let itself be intimidated by the seductions of the world and passing fads."

Hungarian Cardinal Péter Erdő, the synod's general relator, also spoke on the first day, drawing lines in the sand defending traditional positions on topics such as homosexuality, divorce, and contraception. In his 7,000 word address, Erdő said that there are numerous negative forces facing families today, including poverty, war, and climate change, and added “anthropological change,” by which he meant moral relativism and individualism.

Erdő added that all people must be respected in their dignity, and that the Church should minister to all, but also that when Jesus forgave sinners, he also told them to "go and sin no more." It was noted that the content of the speech was consistent with his previous positions, but he delivered it so ardently that he seemed to be trying to set the tone for the rest of the assembly.

In a media briefing after the first day, Cardinal Andre Vingt-Trois of Paris said those who expected radical changes to Church teaching would be "disappointed." Italian Archbishop Bruno Forte agreed, saying that it was "about pastoral attention, pastoral care" for families, but added that the "Church cannot remain insensitive to the challenges ... the synod doesn't meet for nothing." A total of 72 participants spoke in the first two days.

=== Marriage ===
Despite their differences on some issues, it was said that there was "great unanimity" among the synod fathers on the "growing difference between the cultural vision of marriage and family life and what the church proposes and teaches." Diarmuid Martin said that the Church needs "to find a language which is a bridge to the day-to-day reality of marriage – a human reality, a reality not just of ideals, but of struggle and failure, of tears and joys." One small group added that the church needs to be sensitive to the many sacrifices and struggles family make. Cardinal Philippe Ouedraogo of Burkina Faso said it was fundamental that the "church has a big, large open door where everyone can go and enter with all their problems."

==== Divorced and civilly remarried Catholics ====
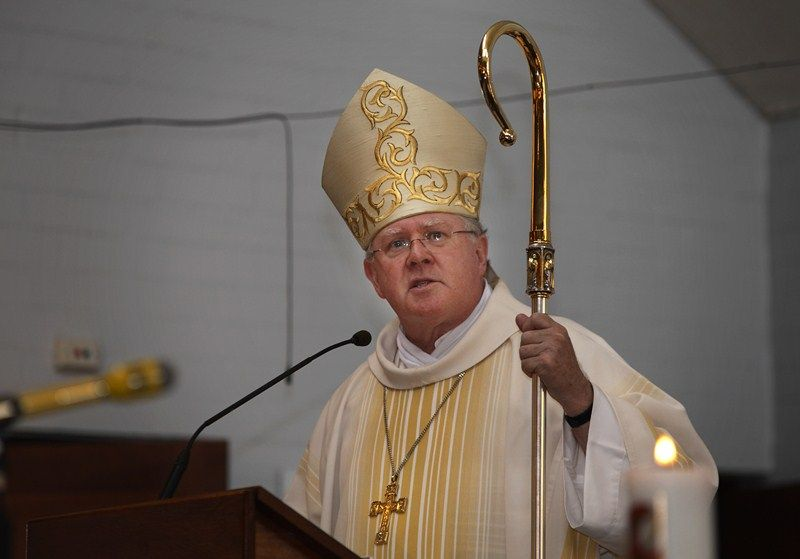
Archbishop Mark Coleridge

Pope Francis, in unplanned remarks on the second day, made two points regarding marriage. First, he said that the Church's doctrine on marriage was not going to be changed, and that the previous assembly of the Synod did not propose changing it. Secondly, he warned his brother bishops not to "reduce their horizons" by boiling the synod down to a single yes or no vote on whether divorced and remarried Catholics can be readmitted to the Eucharist.

Archbishop Mark Coleridge of Australia said at the beginning of the assembly that he estimated 65% of bishops were opposed to allowing remarried Catholics to the sacrament, with 35% in favor. Other bishops discussed allowing individual bishops conferences to determine their own pastoral practice with regard to divorced and remarried Catholics. Coleridge said he believed that proposal had closer to 50% support.

German Archbishop Heiner Koch said that most people he spoke to understood the admittance of remarried Catholics to the Eucharist as a matter of charity and mercy, not of the indissolubility of marriage.

A German language small group proposed having divorced and civilly remarried Catholics deal with the Communion issue in the "internal forum," meaning privately with a confessor or bishop, as opposed to in an "external forum," like an annulment hearing. (Note: An Italian group put forward a similar, but less developed, proposal as well. None of the English groups proposed using the internal forum.) Several groups proposed a special papal commission to give the issue further study.

==== Marriage preparation ====
Speeches were also given stressing the need for better marriage preparation, as well as support for married couples after the wedding. The reality that many young people are pushing back marriage, or not marrying at all, was also acknowledged. Given the complexities of the situation, one group called for more attention to the issues and many called for better marriage preparation programs.

One Synod father mentioned the need for a better approach to pastorally care for those who cohabitate before marriage. Koch spoke about the large numbers of unmarried couples who live together because they do not see marriage as important. One small group recommended that a process be instituted for civilly married or cohabitating couples to be led to the Sacrament of Marriage. Koch added that there was a need to focus on couples where one spouse was Catholic and the other was Protestant.

==== Sexuality ====
Several bishops, who are male celibates, said on the floor that they needed the assistance of married couples to help them better understand sex and marital intimacy. At least one said parents often don't teach their children about sex, and the Church is not filling this void by "present[ing] the good news of human sexuality as a pathway of love, not sin."

Auditor Sharron Cole, president of Parents Centres New Zealand, said it was due time "the Church re-examine its teaching on marriage and sexuality, and its understanding of responsible parenthood, in a dialogue of laity and bishops together." Another auditor, Luis Rojas, who participated in the synod with his wife María Angélica, told the synod fathers that "It's not easy to carry out a marriage, a family, to begin with, and today it's harder than ever." He added that the Church needs to do a better job preparing young couples for marriage, but defined the Church as laity and clergy alike.

==== Other issues ====
Archbishop Eamon Martin, also of Ireland, said the Church needs also to minister to families who have suffered from domestic violence, "those for whom the proclamation of what we call the 'good news of the family' may mean little or nothing." It was noted that in different regions of the world families faced different issues. Some areas have many divorced and civilly remarried couples, it was said, while others face a culture that allows polygamy.

=== More positive language ===
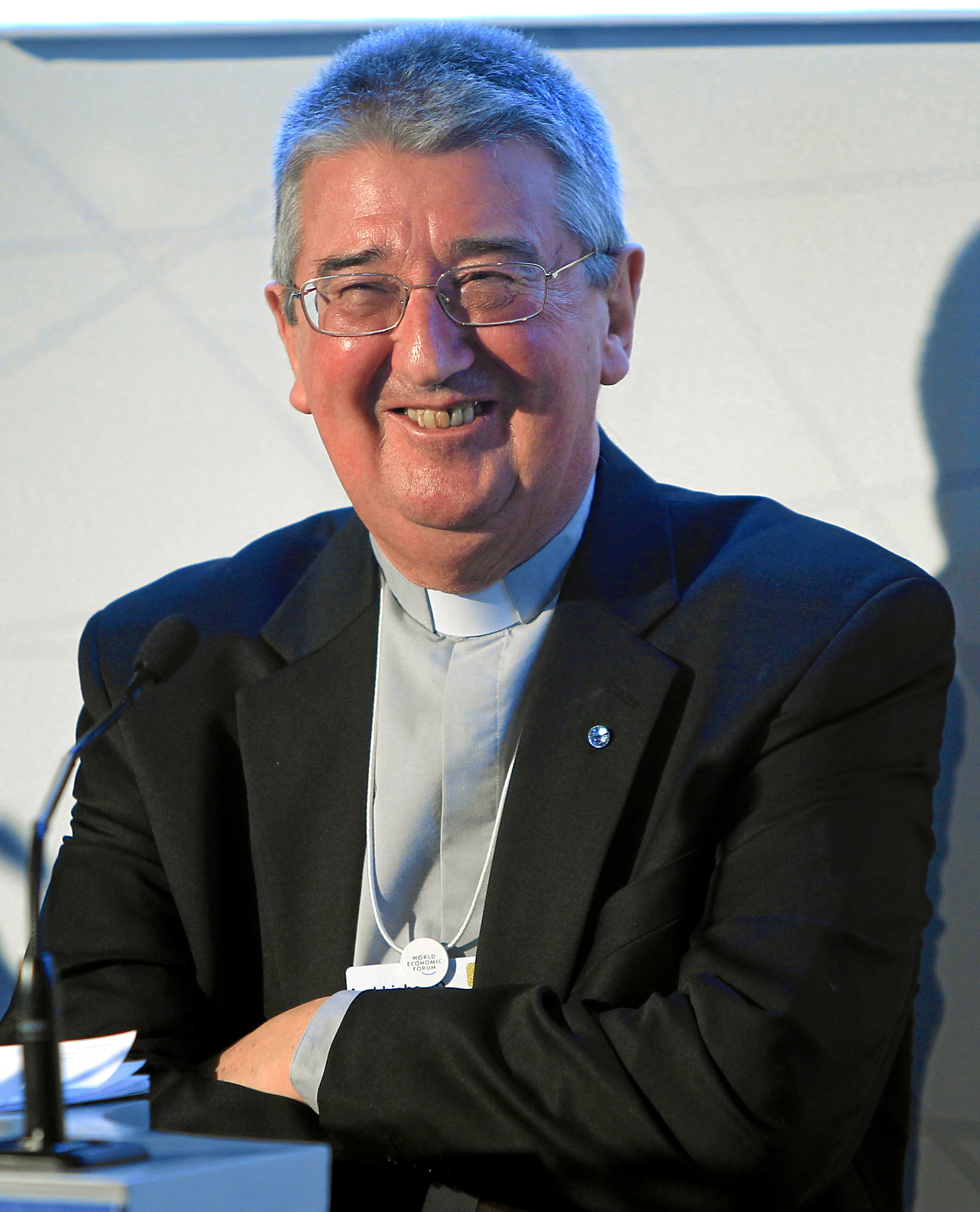
Archbishop Diarmuid Martin

Many Synod fathers stressed the need for the Church to speak in a tone that was positive, clear, simple, and which upheld the ideal family life as one that was obtainable. Irish Archbishop Diarmuid Martin said that "repeating doctrinal formulations alone will not bring the gospel and the good news of the family into an antagonistic society. We have to find a language which helps our young people to appreciate the newness and the challenge of the gospel." Australian Archbishop Mark Coleridge agreed, saying "crude and bleak readings" of modern society "are not what the doctor ordered."

In one press briefing, Coleridge said that this assembly of the synod was shaping up as a "language event," meaning that the Church does not betray its doctrine, but that it changes the vocabulary used to make the Church more accessible and capable of dialogue. He was among the first to use specifics when discussing how the Church could use more positive and welcoming language that would communicate Church teachings in a contemporary context.

Italian Archbishop Vincenzo Paglia, president of the Pontifical Council for the Family, said "it became clear [during the Synod] that there's a need for a new alliance between the family and the Church to proclaim the Gospel in our time," adding that it would require avoiding "ecclesiastical gobbledygook."

Many participants tried to steer the conversation away from families who have not lived up to the Church's teachings, and to instead focus on those who were trying to live their familial lives in accordance with the Church. One small group called for a new way of discussing the indissolubility of marriage as a gift and not a burden.

In particular, Coleridge asked if the synod could "find a language that is in fact positive, less alienating, less excluding." He mentioned the "indissolubility" of marriage, the "intrinsically disordered" nature of homosexual acts, calling divorce and civil remarriage "adultery," and the old maxim of "love the sinner but hate the sin" as phrases that could be updated. Archbishop Charles Chaput said that precision in language was of great import, especially when speaking of "inclusion" and "unity in diversity."

A common theme from the small groups was that the Instrumentum Laboris was too negative in tone, perhaps giving a sense of "pastoral despair," and that many families are able to live out their lives in the Christian tradition. The bishops wanted the discussion to make clear that the realization of Catholic teaching on marriage and the family is something within the reach of ordinary people. One group said the final report "should begin with hope rather than failures, because a great many people already do successfully live the Gospel's good news about marriage."

=== Gay Catholics ===
The rejection of "exclusionary language" towards gays was a topic of discussion. One Synod member, who was not publicly identified, said that gay Catholics "are our children. They are family members. They are not outsiders. They are our flesh and blood. How do we speak about them [positively] and offer a hand of welcome?" According to Coleridge, there was strong support in the early days of the assembly for using a "less condemnatory approach," especially regarding language, when pastorally caring for and speaking about gay Catholics, on the order of 70% in favor and 30% opposed.

Chaput echoed this thought in an interview, saying that the phrase "intrinsically disordered" turns people off and "probably isn't useful anymore." While making clear that any new language adopted should make clear the Church's teaching, he said that this particular phrase should be put "on the shelf for a while, until we get over the negativity related to it." Diarmuid Martin also told the assembly that the successful campaign in his country to legalize gay marriage used "what was traditionally our language: equality, compassion, respect and tolerance."

At least one small group called for a special assembly of the Synod to deal with issues related to homosexuality.

=== Decentralization ===
Pope Francis called for a church that was far more decentralized on the 50th anniversary of the establishment of the synod. He quoted his own Evangelii Gaudium in saying that "It is not advisable for the pope to take the place of local bishops in the discernment of every issue which arises in their territory." While Francis did not speak specifically about whether divorced and civilly remarried couples could be reintroduced to the Eucharist, many other bishops did.

Others also discussed decentralizing authority from Rome and giving local Churches and episcopal conferences more authority to determine their own practices. According to one count, there were roughly 20 speeches in favor of letting local bishops conferences decide what was the best way to offer pastoral care for Catholics who have fallen short of Church teaching, while only two or three opposed it in the first two weeks of speeches. Those in favor argued that the cultural context of each region or country may call for a different response. Opponents argued for unity, saying that there should be a universal approach to significant doctrinal matters.

Others have spoken about having regional or continental gatherings of bishops to discuss issues before formal assemblies of the synod in Rome.

=== Women ===
Canadian Archbishop Paul-Andre Durocher called on the participants of the Synod to reflect on the possibility of allowing for female deacons as this would open up more opportunities for women in church life. Furthermore, where possible, qualified women should be given higher positions and decision-making authority within church structures and new opportunities in ministry, Durocher said. Sister Maureen Kelleher, an American nun, noted that at a 1974 assembly of the synod there were two women religious invited, and in 2015, 40 years later, that number had only grown to three.

Durocher also condemned the high rates of domestic violence, as did Rev. Garas Boulos Garas Bishay of Egypt, an auditor in the assembly. Kelleher called on priests to be better trained in issues relating to domestic violence "so they might accompany these families and not tell the woman to go back home."

Lucetta Scaraffia, another auditor, professor, and coordinator of the Vatican newspaper's monthly insert "Women, Church, World," complained that the synod's documents said very little about women, and that they needed to be listened to in greater numbers. Agnes Offiong Erogunaye, national president of Catholic Women Organization of Nigeria, said mothers are "the heart of the family" and that their contributions must be recognized and supported.

The number of single women who are caring for children and running a household is growing, Scaraffia said, giving rise to a need for a greater focus on single mothers. Discussion about families should not exclude them by speaking only about an ideal family, she said.

=== Other issues ===
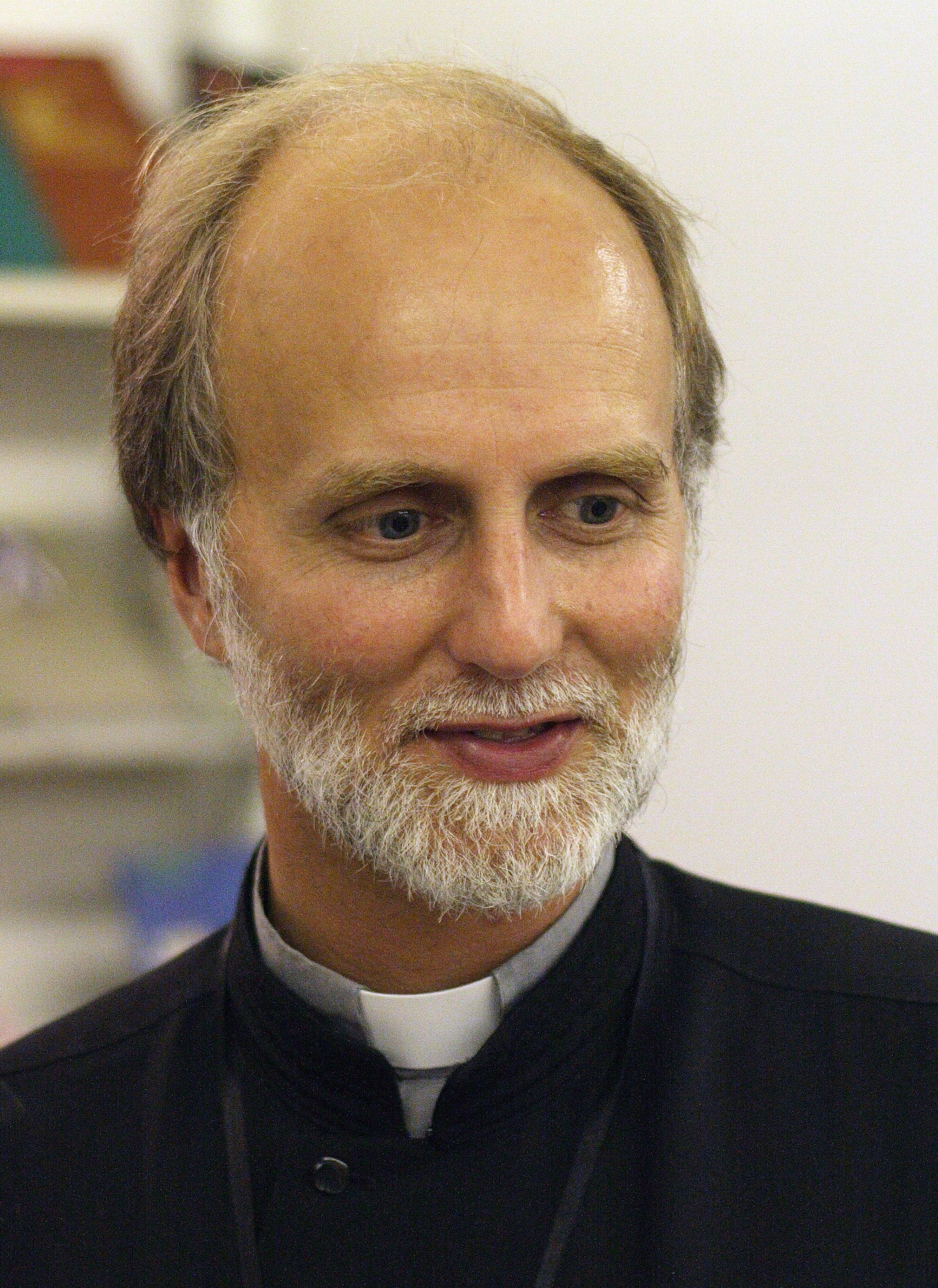
Eparch Borys Gudziak

Durocher suggested that properly trained married couples could speak during the homily portion of Mass "so that they can testify, give witness to the relationship between God's word and their own marriage life and their own life as families." The role of women in the Church was raised again during the second week, with one group advocating giving women greater leadership roles, and another citing the need to focus on violence against women.

Some felt the conversation was based primarily on European and North American family life, and did not adequately encapsulate the universality of the Church. Many bishops also consider the Church to be contributing to the problem of family life in that there is inadequate pastoral support and Christian formation for families.

Poverty, unemployment, migration, war, and the continuing refugee crisis were common themes in the early speeches. Several wanted to expand the conversation to include "gender theory," or the idea that gender is fungible, and the propensity of some international aid groups to tie their assistance to liberalizing sexual policies. Participants also discussed reintroducing a communal rite for the Sacrament of Reconciliation.

The instrumentum laboris was also criticized for, among other things, lacking a definition of marriage. Some suggested looking to the Book of Genesis, which it was said defined the institution as the union of a man and a woman based on "monogamy, permanence, and equality of the sexes." More references to Scripture in general were also called for. Others suggestion attention be given to single people, widows, and celibate Catholics. Chaput described unity within the Church as the most urgent need.

Borys Gudziak, Eparch of the Ukrainian Greek Catholic Eparchy of Paris, said that in many areas of the world there is no civil marriage, only a religious one, and that global poverty, homelessness, living as a refugee, and being an orphan are all "impediments to good family life."

The auditors Jadwiga and Jacek Pulikowska of Poland said that while the Church should encourage families who follow Church teachings, that families in crisis need greater attention and care. Bishay, who ministers to Christian migrants, told the synod fathers that Christian women marrying Muslim men was "a profound worry and concern" and that it led to "serious crises" for mixed families.

=== Closing statement ===
In his closing statement, Pope Francis highlighted the "importance of the institution of the family and of marriage between a man and a woman, based on unity and indissolubility." He added that the two year, two assembly process "was not about finding exhaustive solutions for all the difficulties and uncertainties which challenge and threaten the family," but about confronting them head on, "without burying our heads in the sand."

Francis also made references to the speeches and statements made "at times, unfortunately, not entirely in well-meaning ways." He said the experience shows that the synod "does not simply rubber stamp" predetermined positions. Instead, he said, it "was about trying to open up broader horizons, rising above conspiracy theories and blinkered viewpoints, so as to defend and spread the freedom of the children of God, and to transmit the beauty of Christian newness, at times encrusted in a language which is archaic or simply incomprehensible."

He also criticized those with "closed hearts which frequently hide even behind the Church's teachings or good intentions” in order to “judge, sometimes with superiority and superficiality, difficult cases and wounded families."

== Final report ==
The final report of the synod, known as a relatio synodi (report of the synod), was easily passed with each of the 94 paragraphs receiving more than two-thirds of the bishops present voting for it. A committee of 10 clerics drafted the document after reviewing the 1,350 speeches given during the assembly, using largely conciliatory language.

=== Marriage ===
The report called for divorced and civilly remarried Catholics to be more integrated into the Church, but did not mention any specifics. "They are baptized, they are brothers and sisters, and the Holy Spirit pours out gifts and charisms on them for the good of all," the report said; "taking care of these people is not a weakness in its own faith and its witness as to the indissolubility of marriage; indeed, the Church expresses its own charity through this care."

The document was silent on the topic of whether, or how, they should be readmitted to the Eucharist. Paragraph 86, which had the highest number of negative votes, contained a general reference to the internal forum. Advocates of granting permission for divorced and remarried Catholics to receive the Eucharist have suggested that such permission could be granted through the internal forum.

It also called for outreach to couples who live together before they are wed, saying they should strive for "the fullness of marriage and the family." It acknowledged the many reasons couples may choose to cohabitate.

=== Homosexuality ===
The report repeated Church teaching that every person, gay or straight, should be treated with dignity and not face unjust discrimination, but also reaffirmed that marriage was between a man and a woman. It did not describe how the Church should minister directly to them, but did say that there should be outreach for their families. It also condemned international aid groups who tied development aid to the adoption of pro-gay policies, and also rejected the notion that gender isn't fixed, which if accepted "envisages a society without gender differences, and empties the anthropological foundation of the family."

=== Other issues ===
The final report also discussed other issues that affect families, including poverty, migrants, refugees, those being persecuted for their faith, as well as the pastoral needs of the handicapped, the elderly, widows, and those in interfaith marriages. Additionally, it condemned "the growing phenomena of violence of which women are victims within the family," and said the Church could do more to promote appreciation of women and their promotion to positions of authority.

== Post-synodal apostolic exhortation ==
From the reflexions of this synod, and the ones of the Third Extraordinary General Assembly of the Synod of Bishops, Pope Francis wrote the post-synodal apostolic exhortation Amoris laetitia.

== Canonizations ==
On Sunday, 18 October 2015 Pope Francis canonized Louis and Marie-Azélie Guérin Martin. They were the parents of Saint Thérèse of Lisieux, and had four other daughters who became nuns. They are the first married couple to be canonized together.

Pope Francis also canonized an Italian priest, Vincenzo Grossi, and a Spanish nun, Maria Cristina of the Immaculate Conception Brando, both of whom spent most of their lives helping the poor.

== Participants ==
The 2015 assembly is larger than the one held in 2014, containing "a great part of the episcopate," with many participating bishops being elected by their peers. While only the 279 appointed priests and bishops can vote, 90 experts, contributors, and delegates from other Christian churches were invited to attend and participate in discussions. Of the auditors, 17 were married couples and 17 were individuals. Of the individual auditors, 13 of the 17 are women, including three nuns.

The Benedictine abbot Jeremias Schröder reported that the Catholic fraternal orders considered giving half of their ten seats to the female orders that are not eligible to vote. However, the Unione Superiori Generali finally concluded that it would be not enough if the female orders should get seats of the fraternal orders but that they should get their own seats.

American Archbishop Blase Cupich said he believed that the synod would benefit from hearing from "the actual voices of people who feel marginalized, rather than having them filtered through the voices of other representatives or the bishops." He specifically cited "the elderly, or the divorced and remarried, gay and lesbian individuals, also couples." American bishop George V. Murry said the assembly would have benefited from "presentations by theologians, biblical scholars, canonists or cultural historians, to get a broader view" of the issues facing them. Murry also supported greater lay participation.

- Presidents: Cardinals Andre Vingt-Trois, Luis Antonio Tagle, Raymundo Damasceno Assis, and Wilfrid F. Napier
- Relator: Cardinal Péter Erdő
- General Secretary: Cardinal Lorenzo Baldisseri
- Special Secretary: Archbishop Bruno Forte
- Final report drafting committee: Cardinals Peter Erdo, Baldisseri, Oswald Gracias, Donald Wuerl, John Dew, Archbishops Bruno Forte, Victor Manuel Fernandez, Bishop Mathieu Madega Lebouakehan, Marcello Semeraro, and Fr. Adolfo Nicolas.
