= Synod of Bishops in the Catholic Church =

Advisory body of Catholic bishops for the pope

In the Catholic Church, the Synod of Bishops is an influential, global, consultative and advisory body to the pope. It is one of the mechanisms through which Catholic bishops—the most senior ordained members of the Church—communally render "cooperative assistance" to the pontiff in fulfilling his office and leading the church. It is described in the 1983 Code of Canon Law as:

a group of bishops who have been chosen from different regions of the world and meet at fixed times to foster closer unity between the Roman Pontiff and bishops, to assist the Roman Pontiff with their counsel in the preservation and growth of faith and morals and in the observance and strengthening of ecclesiastical discipline, and to consider questions pertaining to the activity of the Church in the world.

The papal Synod of Bishops is permanent, even when not in session. Periodically, it holds assemblies, which are either general, if called to consider matters directly concerning the universal Church, or special, if called for problems of a particular geographical area. The general assemblies are either ordinary (held at fixed intervals) or extraordinary (held to treat of some urgent matter).

The papal Synod of Bishops also has a permanent secretariat headquartered in Rome but not part of the Roman Curia. Pope Francis greatly increased both the authority and influence of the Synod in September 2018.

In addition, each 'Eastern Catholic' patriarchal church and each major archiepiscopal church has its own synod of bishops. The Code of Canons of the Eastern Churches refers 115 times to the "synod of bishops" in this sense, and only once (in canon 46) mentions the Synod of Bishops that the pope convokes.

== History ==
=== Establishment ===
In 1959, three years before the Second Vatican Council began, Cardinal Silvio Oddi proposed a permanent consultative body of bishops drawn from many parts of the world to discuss major concerns of the Church, and Cardinal Bernardus Johannes Alfrink proposed a permanent council of specialized bishops to legislate for the Church in union with the Pope and the cardinals.

Within the framework of the Council itself, the first to put forward "the idea of a 'permanent synod of bishops' surrounding the pope" was Melkite Patriarch Maximos IV. In 1963, during the third session of the Council, he proposed that "a relatively small group of bishops [...] with rotating membership would always be in session in Rome to assist the pope. They would work with the pope in collegial fashion". The model he proposed was what the 1990 Code of Canons of the Eastern Churches was to call the synod of bishops, but that he himself called the holy synod of his sui iuris church, a collegial body comprising both the patriarch and other bishops.

On 14 September 1965, at the opening of the fourth and final session of the Council, Pope Paul VI announced that on the following day he was to establish the Synod of Bishops in a form that "could hardly have been further from what Maximos had proposed in the previous year". He noted that "the Ecumenical Council ... gave Us the idea of permanently establishing a special Council of bishops, with the aim of providing for a continuance after the Council of the great abundance of benefits that We have been so happy to see flow to the Christian people during the time of the Council as a result of Our close collaboration with the bishops." The Pope sought "to make ever greater use of the bishops' assistance in providing for the good of the universal Church" and to enjoy "the consolation of their presence, the help of their wisdom and experience, the support of their counsel, and the voice of their authority". This preempted action by the Council, and made the Synod "immediately and directly" subject to papal authority, ensuring that it would be strictly an advisory body. The Synod of the Bishops does not constitute collegial governance of the Church, but represents a collaboration with the Pope: it discusses topics proposed to it and makes recommendations, but does not settle questions or issue decrees, unless the Pope grants it deliberative power in certain cases.

The Council's Decree concerning the Pastoral Office of Bishops in the Church (28 October 1965) announced that

Bishops chosen from various parts of the world, in ways and manners established or to be established by the Roman pontiff, [would] render more effective assistance to the supreme pastor of the Church in a deliberative body which will be called by the proper name of Synod of Bishops. Since it shall be acting in the name of the entire Catholic episcopate, it will at the same time show that all the bishops in hierarchical communion partake of the solicitude for the universal Church.

=== Collegial governance under Pope Francis ===
From the beginning of his papacy, Pope Francis expressed his desire to strengthen the collegial aspects of the Church's governance, and he argued for more recognition of charismatic gifts in the Church. He has held major synods on the topics of the family (2014), on youth (2018), and on the Church in the Pan-Amazon region (2019). On September 15, 2018, Francis approved a new apostolic constitution Episcopalis communio (Episcopal Communion). The constitution states that the Synod's final document, if approved by the members with "moral unanimity" and, if the Pope has "granted deliberative power to the Synod Assembly", it becomes part of the Ordinary Magisterium of Catholic teaching, "once it has been ratified and promulgated by him". The new constitution also provides for the laity to send their contributions directly to the synod's secretary general. Some analysts surmise that the greatest achievement of Francis' papacy may be his creation of a more synodal Catholic church, where synods serve as a platform for open and energetic debate.

On 6 February 2021, Pope Francis appointed Nathalie Becquart an undersecretary of the Synod of Bishops, making her the first woman to have the right to vote in the Synod of Bishops.

On April 26, 2023, Pope Francis announced that women would be allowed to vote at the Sixteenth Ordinary General Assembly of the Synod of Bishops, marking the first time women were allowed to vote at any Synod of Bishops.

== Distinction from synods of bishops in Eastern Catholic Churches and Holy Synods ==
Unlike the (latin or papal) Synod of Bishops, which normally assists the pope only by offering advice, these Eastern Church synods of bishops are competent, and exclusively so, to make laws for the entire sui iuris (autonomous) church that each governs. In the latin tradition and law, on the other hand, the Synod is convened by the Pope and is primarily a method of delivering assistance to him in his supreme office, rather than a governing body in itself, or from which the principal church leader derives authority.

These synods of bishops are not what in Eastern Orthodox and Oriental Orthodox Churches are called Holy Synods. The latter concept corresponds instead to that of the standing synod of these Eastern Catholic synods of bishops, which consists of the patriarch or major archbishop and four bishops appointed for a five-year term. Of the four, three are elected by the church's synod of bishops and one is appointed by the patriarch or major archbishop, while another four are designated in the same way to replace any member who is impeded. A meeting of a whole synod of bishops is called when a decision is required on a question that only the synod of bishops is authorized to decide, or when the patriarch or major archbishop, with the agreement of the standing synod, judges it to be necessary, or when at least one third of the bishops request that it be held to consider some specific matter. In addition, the individual canon law of some patriarchal and major archiepiscopal churches requires that the synod of bishops be convoked at predetermined intervals.

== Secretariat and Council ==
The Synod of the Bishops has its own permanent general secretariat, composed of the General Secretary and a fifteen-member council, twelve of whom are elected by each general assembly and three are appointed by the Pope. The secretariat assists in preparing the apostolic exhortation which the Pope publishes on the basis of the recommendations of each general assembly, and it prepares the next assembly. Their function ceases with the start of a new general assembly. A similar function is performed by specific special councils elected by the special assemblies.

=== Secretaries-General of the Synod of Bishops ===
- Władysław Rubin (27 February 1967 – 12 July 1979)
- Jozef Tomko (12 July 1979 – 24 April 1985)
- Jan Pieter Schotte, C.I.C.M. (24 April 1985 – 11 February 2004)
- Nikola Eterović (11 February 2004 – 21 September 2013)
- Lorenzo Baldisseri (21 September 2013 – 15 September 2020)
- Mario Grech (15 September 2020 – present)

== Powers of the pope ==
The pope convokes the Synod of Bishops; ratifies the election of participants; determines the topic of discussion; distributes the material for discussion; sets the agenda; and presides either personally or through delegates. The pope may also appoint participants of his own choosing, their number limited to 15% of the other delegates who participate either ex officio or as elected representatives of episcopal conferences or the Union of Superiors General.

== Assemblies ==
The procedures followed at assemblies of the Synod of the Bishops are indicated in the Order of the Synod of Bishops, originally issued in 1969, the latest revision of which was published on 29 September 2006.

=== Ordinary general assemblies ===
In preparation for each ordinary general assembly, episcopal conferences are asked to suggest up to three themes for discussion. After the secretariat has studied those proposals, the Pope, generally on the basis of the secretariat's recommendation, establishes the topic and agenda of the assembly. Criteria for the choice of the topic are: 1) that it be of universal, not merely regional, interest; 2) that it be pastoral in character with a firm doctrinal base; 3) that it be contemporary and urgent enough to stir up "new energies and movements in the church towards growth"; 4) that it can be addressed within the allotted time.

Most participants in the assembly, called Synodal fathers, are elected by the bishops' conferences: one in the case of a conference with no more than 25 members, two if a conference has up to 50 members, three from a conference with up to 100 members, and four from a larger conference. Other representative participants include heads of Eastern Catholic Churches, ten members of religious institutes elected by the Union of Superiors General, and the cardinals who head the Roman Congregations and some other departments of the Roman Curia. Dozens more participate by virtue of synodal functions assigned by the Holy See or as papal appointees, mostly cardinals and other curiate or diocesan prelates.

Fraternal delegates from several Orthodox and Protestant churches (7 each in 2015) have observer status.

The secretariat, which includes various other clerical and lay experts, prepares a preliminary outline document (Lineamenta) which is distributed to all concerned for comment. Based on this feedback, a working document (instrumentum laboris) is prepared and distributed to all churches. This document is the basis for discussions at the synod. The assembly examines proposals (propositiones) put forward by its members and passes to the Pope those that receive the assembly's approval. The Pope uses these as the basis for a papal post-synodal apostolic exhortation.

The first general assemblies attempted to draw up their own concluding documents, but found that the time available was insufficient for doing so properly.

=== Extraordinary general assemblies ===
In view of the greater urgency that justify their convocation, the preparation of extraordinary general assemblies of the Synod of the Bishops is shorter. The participants also are fewer, consisting of the heads of Eastern Catholic Churches, the presidents (only) of episcopal conferences, three members (not ten) of religious institutes and the cardinals who head dicasteries of the Roman Curia.

As of October 2014, there have been three such assemblies, in 1969, 1985, and 2014. The 1985 assembly commemorated the twentieth anniversary of the conclusion of the Second Vatican Council.

=== Special assemblies ===
Special assemblies of the Synod of the Bishops are limited to a certain geographical area, a country, region, or continent. Their participants, chosen in line with the rules for extraordinary general assemblies, are limited to those directly involved in that geographical area.

Special assemblies have been held for Africa (twice), America, Asia, Europe (twice), Oceania, the Middle East, Lebanon, and the Netherlands. Another is planned for the Amazon region.

== Chronology ==
The Synod of the Bishops has held the following assemblies:

=== Ordinary General ===
Year	Number	Topic	Concluding document or apostolic exhortation
1967	I	Preserving and Strengthening the Catholic Faith	None. Called for the creation of an International Theological Commission and a revision of the 1917 Code of Canon Law.
1971	II	The Ministerial Priesthood and Justice in the World	Justice in the World
1974	III	Evangelization in the Modern World	Evangelii nuntiandi (apostolic exhortation) (Note: The Synod participants, divided in interests and philosophies, had problems producing a report of their discussions to submit to Pope Paul, and he disputed many of their contributions.)
1977	IV	Catechesis in Our Time	Catechesi Tradendae (apostolic exhortation)
1980	V	The Christian Family	Familiaris consortio (apostolic exhortation)
1983	VI	Penance and Reconciliation in the Mission of the Church	Reconciliatio et paenitentia (apostolic exhortation)
1987	VII	The Vocation and Mission of the Lay Faithful in the Church and in the World	Christifideles laici (apostolic exhortation)
1990	VIII	The Formation of Priests in Circumstances of the Present Day	Pastores dabo vobis (apostolic exhortation)
1994	IX	The Consecrated Life and its Role in the Church and in the World	Vita consecrata
2001	X	The Bishop: Servant of the Gospel of Jesus Christ for the Hope of the World	Pastores gregis (apostolic exhortation)
2005	XI	The Eucharist: Source and Summit of the Life and Mission of the Church	Sacramentum caritatis (apostolic exhortation)
2008	XII	The Word of God in the Life and Mission of the Church	Verbum Domini (apostolic exhortation)
2012	XIII	The New Evangelization for the Transmission of the Christian Faith	Evangelii gaudium (apostolic exhortation)
2015	XIV	The Vocation and Mission of the Family in the Church and in the Contemporary World	Amoris laetitia (apostolic exhortation)
2018	XV	Young People, Faith, and Vocational Discernment	Christus Vivit (apostolic exhortation)
2021–24	XVI	For a Synodal Church: Communion, Participation and Mission	Final Document of the XVI Synod of Bishops

=== Extraordinary General ===
Year	Number	Topic	Concluding document or apostolic exhortation
1969	I	Cooperation between the Holy See and the Episcopal Conferences	
1985	II	The Twentieth Anniversary of the Conclusion of the Second Vatican Council	The Church, in the Word of God, Celebrates the Mysteries of Christ for the Salvation of the World, Rome
2014	III	The Pastoral Challenges of the Family in the Context of Evangelization	*Relatio Synodi of the III Extraordinary General Assembly of the Synod of Bishops: "Pastoral Challenges to the Family in the Context of Evangelization", Rome

=== Special ===
Year	Topic	Concluding document or apostolic exhortation
1980	Netherlands	John Paul II, Pope (30 January 1980), Conclusions of the Special Synod of the Bishops of the Netherlands, Rome: Libreria Editrice Vaticana
1991	Europe	
1994	Africa	——— (14 September 1995), Ecclesia in Africa (Apostolic exhortation), Rome: Libreria Editrice Vaticana
1995	Lebanon	——— (10 May 1997), Ecclesia in Libanon (Apostolic exhortation), Rome: Libreria Editrice Vaticana
1997	America	——— (22 November 1999), Ecclesia in America (Apostolic exhortation), Rome: Libreria Editrice Vaticana
1998	Asia (Note: The synod devoted to Asia provoked a very critical response from the bishops of Japan.)	——— (6 November 1999), Ecclesia in Asia (Apostolic exhortation), Rome: Libreria Editrice Vaticana
1998	Oceania	——— (6 November 1999), Ecclesia in Oceania (Apostolic exhortation), Rome: Libreria Editrice Vaticana
1999	Europe	——— (28 June 2003), Ecclesia in Europa (Apostolic exhortation), Rome: Libreria Editrice Vaticana
2009	Africa	Benedict XVI, Pope (19 November 2011), Africae munus (Apostolic exhortation), Rome: Libreria Editrice Vaticana
2010	Middle East	——— (9 September 2012), Ecclesia in Medio Oriente (Apostolic exhortation), Rome: Libreria Editrice Vaticana
2019	Pan-Amazon region	Francis, Pope (2 February 2020), Querida Amazonia (Apostolic exhortation), Rome: Libreria Editrice Vaticana

== See also ==
- Collegiality (Catholic Church)
- College of Bishops
- Synodality
- Synod
