= Synodality =

Catholic term

Synodality (from synod which is Greek σύν "together", and ὁδός "way, journey") in the Catholic Church is a term "often used to describe the process of fraternal collaboration and discernment" in the whole church. The Synod of Bishops is held to embody this characteristic of the church.

== Meaning ==
Synodality denotes the particular style that qualifies the life and mission of the Catholic Church. Theologian Jessica Murdoch, associate professor of fundamental and dogmatic theology at Villanova University, has observed that "synodality is a rich concept with a long history in the Church". The Holy See's International Theological Commission states that synodality, when it concerns the Catholic Church, designates "the specific modus vivendi et operandi of the Church, the People of God, which reveals and gives substance to her being as communion when all her members journey together, gather in assembly and take an active part in her evangelising mission". Synodality also "refers to the involvement and participation of the whole People of God in the life and mission of the Church". The church's Dicastery for Promoting Christian Unity notes that the term synodality "[b]roadly [...] refers to the active participation of all the faithful in the life and mission of the Church".

The final document of the Sixteenth Ordinary General Assembly of the Synod of Bishops (also called the Synod on synodality) defines synodality as "a path of spiritual renewal and structural reform that enables the Church to be more participatory and missionary, so that it can walk with every man and woman, radiating the light of Christ".

== Contemporary usage ==
Synodality is seen as one of the key words that characterized the pontificate of Pope Francis.

A document by the International Theological Commission discussing synodality was published in March 2018.

Synodality became the theme of the Synod on synodality.

== See also ==
- Collegiality in the Catholic Church
- Conciliarity
- Sensus fidelium
- Synod of Bishops in the Catholic Church
