= Fraternal delegates =

Official delegates who expresses fraternal bonds

Fraternal delegates are official delegates, who attend major assemblies of a friendly body as a formal expression of the fraternal bonds.

In politics, that is customary among fraternal parties.

In religion, it happens between churches engaged in an ecumenical process. Thus the Holy See invited to Rome for the Roman Catholic Church's 14th Ordinary General Assembly of the Synod of Bishops in October 2015, on family, 'fraternal' delegates from Orthodox churches (Ecumenical Patriarchate of Constantinople, Russian Orthodox Church, Serbian Orthodox Church, Romanian Orthodox Church, Albanian Orthodox Church, Coptic Orthodox Church, Syriac Orthodox Church), and Protestant churches (Anglican Communion, World Lutheran Federation, Ecumenical Council of Churches, World Evangelical Alliance, World Methodist Council, Christian Church (Disciples of Christ), and World Baptist Alliance).
