= Lorenzo Baldisseri =

Italian cardinal

His Eminence Lorenzo Baldisseri
- Secretary General emeritus of the Synod of Bishops
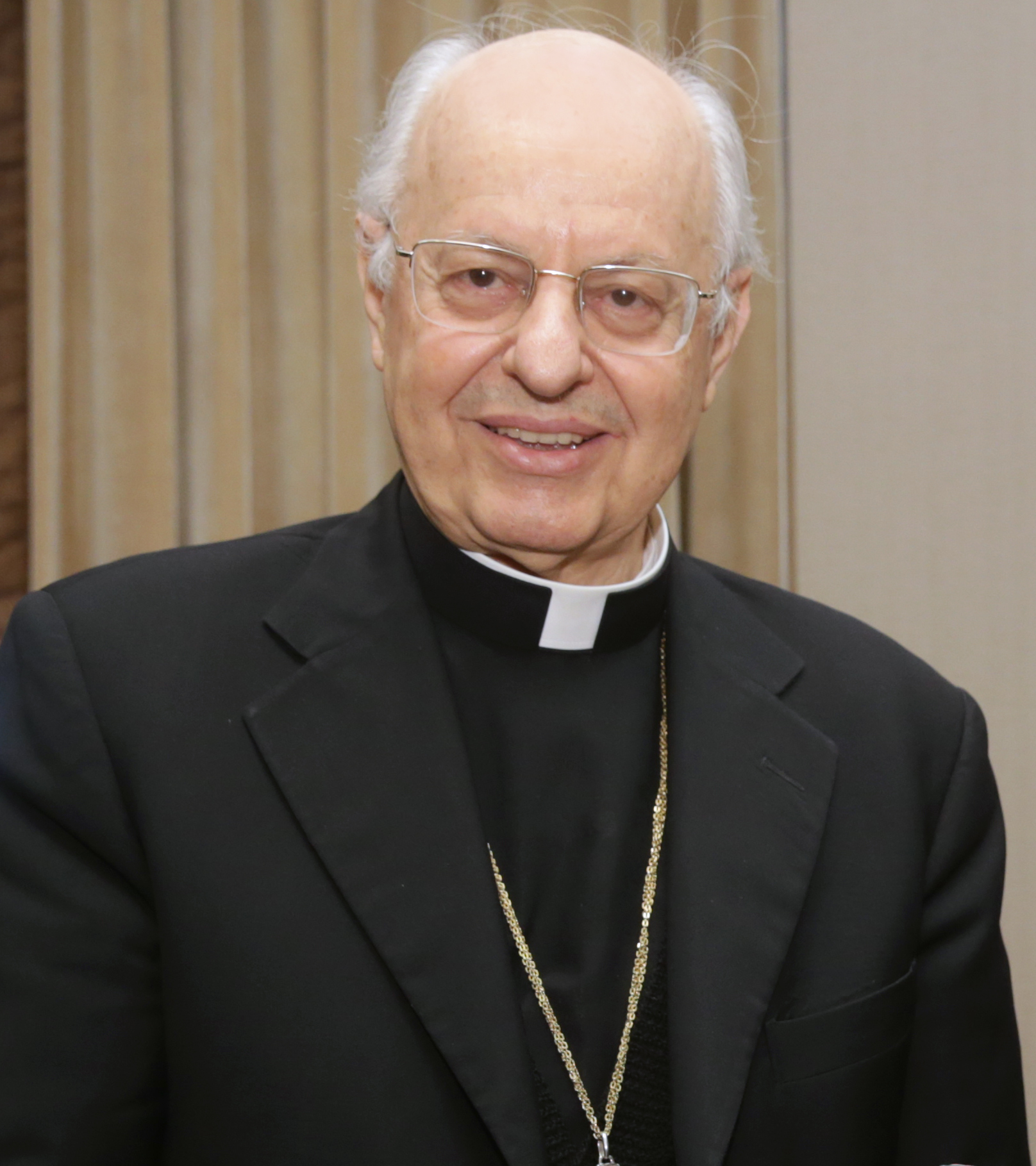
- Baldisseri in 2017
- Church: Catholic Church
- Appointed: 21 September 2013
- Term ended: 16 September 2020
- Predecessor: Nikola Eterović
- Successor: Mario Grech
- Other post: Cardinal-Priest of Sant'Anselmo all'Aventino
- Previous posts: Titular Archbishop of Diocletiana (1992–2014); Apostolic Nuncio to Haiti (1992–1995); Apostolic Nuncio to Paraguay (1995–1999); Apostolic Nuncio to India (1999–2002); Apostolic Nuncio to Nepal (1999–2002); Apostolic Nuncio to Brazil (2002–2012); Secretary of the Congregation for Bishops (2012–2013); Secretary of the Sacred College of Cardinals (2012–2014)

Orders
- Ordination: 29 June 1963 by Ugo Camozzo
- Consecration: 7 March 1992 by Angelo Sodano
- Created cardinal: 22 February 2014 by Pope Francis
- Rank: Cardinal-Deacon (2014–2024); Cardinal-Priest (2024–)

Personal details
- Born: Lorenzo Baldisseri; 29 September 1940 (age 86) Barga, Kingdom of Italy
- Denomination: Roman Catholic
- Education: University of Perugia, Pontifical Ecclesiastical Academy, Pontifical Lateran University
- Motto: Itinere Laete Servire Domino (Serve the Lord Joyfully)
- Coat of arms: Lorenzo Baldisseri's coat of arms

Styles of Lorenzo Baldisseri
- Reference style: His Eminence
- Spoken style: Your Eminence
- Religious style: Cardinal
- Informal style: Cardinal

Ordination history of Lorenzo Baldisseri
History
Episcopal consecration
- Principal consecrator: Angelo Sodano
- Co-consecrators: Justin Rigali; Alessandro Plotti
Cardinalate
- Elevated by: Pope Francis
Episcopal succession
Bishops consecrated by Lorenzo Baldisseri as principal consecrator
- Afonso Fioreze: 15 February 2004
- Severino Clasen: 25 June 2005
- Ângelo Pignoli: 11 March 2007
- Juarez Sousa Da Silva: 17 May 2008
- José Moreira da Silva: 17 January 2009
- Odelir José Magri: 12 December 2010
- Jaime Spengler: 5 February 2011

Lorenzo Baldisseri (Italian pronunciation: [loˈrɛntso baldisˈsɛːri]) (born 29 September 1940) is an Italian prelate of the Catholic Church who served as Secretary General of the Synod of Bishops from 21 September 2013 until 15 September 2020. He was made a cardinal in 2014. He previously served as Secretary of the Congregation for Bishops after more than twenty years in the diplomatic service of the Holy See that included stints as Apostolic Nuncio to Haiti, Paraguay, India, Nepal, and Brazil.

== Early years ==
Baldisseri was born in Barga, in the province of Lucca, Italy, on 29 September 1940 and ordained on 29 June 1963. He studied at the Pontifical Lateran University and the University of Perugia from 1970 to 1973. He earned a doctorate in canon law, with a thesis entitled: "The Nunciature in Tuscany". To prepare for a diplomatic career he entered the Pontifical Ecclesiastical Academy in 1971. He then joined the diplomatic service of the Holy See and served in many areas of the world over the next two decades.

On 15 January 1992, Pope John Paul II appointed him Titular Archbishop of Diocletiana and Apostolic Nuncio to Haiti. He was named Apostolic Nuncio to Paraguay on 6 April 1995. He then took up a pair of titles, Apostolic Nuncio to India on 19 June 1999 and Apostolic Nuncio to Nepal on 23 June 1999. He was appointed to his last diplomatic post as nuncio to Brazil on 12 November 2002.

== Secretary of the Congregation for Bishops ==
He was appointed secretary of the Congregation for Bishops on 11 January 2012. He served as secretary of the College of Cardinals from 7 March 2012 to 28 January 2014. In that role, he served as secretary of the 2013 conclave that elected Pope Francis. At the end of that conclave, Pope Francis gave his red cardinal's zucchetto to Baldisseri, in a move that was seen as an indication that he would soon be made a cardinal. (Note: Pope John XXIII upon his election in 1958 had performed a similar action, placing his zucchetto on the head of Alberto di Jorio, secretary of the conclave, and making him a cardinal six weeks later.)

In January 2013, he reported on Pope Benedict XVI's meetings with the world's bishops. Known as ad limina visits, they are supposed to occur every five years. Baldisseri said that it had taken Benedict more than seven years to complete the full cycle.

In early September 2013, Baldisseri was part of a group of 30 officials of the Roman Curia who met with Pope Francis to offer their views and concerns with respect to his proposed reorganization of the Vatican's administrative apparatus.

== General Secretary of the Synod of Bishops ==
Pope Francis named Baldisseri the General Secretary of the Synod of Bishops on 21 September 2013. His central responsibility was to organize the synod operations according to the pope's vision, "to radically revamp its working methods".

In October 2013, Baldisseri asked national bishops conferences around the world to conduct a wide-ranging poll of Catholics asking for their opinions on church teachings on contraception, same-sex marriage and divorce. Baldisseri asked the episcopal conferences to distribute the poll "immediately as widely as possible to deaneries and parishes so that input from local sources can be received." The poll, part of a questionnaire sent to national bishops' conferences globally in preparation for a 2014 Vatican synod on the family, was the first time the church's central hierarchy had asked for such input from grass-roots Catholics since the establishment of the synod system following the Second Vatican Council.

In a May 2014 newspaper interview, Baldisseri said it was time to update Church doctrine in connection with divorce and people who are in civil partnerships: "The Church is not timeless, she lives amidst the vicissitudes of history and the Gospel must be known and experienced by people today.... It is in the present that the message should be, with all respect for the integrity from whom the message has been received. We now have two synods to treat this complex theme of the family and I believe that these dynamics in two movements will allow a more adequate response to the expectations of the people."

In July 2014, Baldisseri said that the structure of the upcoming extraordinary Synod of Bishops on the family would be shorter than previous synods and would include new rules aimed at helping the bishops really grapple with the issues together: "We want a frank, open, civilized discussion,". Along with Vatican spokesman Federico Lombardi, Baldisseri served as the public voice of the synod, explaining its procedures and the ways its format departed from those of previous synods.

The topics raised in the questionnaire included contraception, divorce and remarriage, same-sex marriage, premarital sex and in vitro fertilization. Some responses questioned the church's teaching or encouraged greater understanding of people who cannot always live up to that teaching. Cardinal Baldisseri said that the bishops "must recognize that the faithful perceive the truth" about the Gospel and its values and their input cannot be ignored. "But the bishops have the responsibility and authority to discern ways to apply the constant teaching of the church," he said. The big change from past synods is that the voting members of the extraordinary synod will be asked to submit their presentations in writing at least two weeks before the meeting opens, the cardinal said."This is not to limit the discussion, but to help organize it". The report opening the synod, which used to be a rephrasing of the synod working document, now will be a first summary of the bishops' submissions, he said.

At a 3 October 2014 press conference, when asked how the Synod on the Family would address the topic of divorced and remarried Catholics, he said "The Synod is about family, not divorce. Let's not monopolize it with Western problems. We need to present the beauty of the family to the world" and "we want to walk and view the global challenges to find an answer in the light of the Gospel". He served as the synod's general secretary.

== Cardinal ==
Pope Francis raised Baldisseri to the rank of Cardinal-Deacon on 22 February 2014 and assigned him to the deaconry of Sant’Anselmo all'Aventino.

In December 2013, he was appointed a member of the Congregation for Bishops and that appointment was confirmed in May 2014, after he became a cardinal.

On 13 September 2014, he was appointed a member of the Congregation for the Evangelization of Peoples.

Pope Francis appointed Mario Grech Pro-Secretary General of the Synod of Bishops on 2 October 2019 to serve in anticipation of Baldisseri's retirement. Pope Francis accepted Baldisseri's resignation on 15 September 2020.

Baldisseri joined the order of cardinal-priests on 1 July 2024.

== See also ==
- Cardinals created by Pope Francis

== Notes ==
Diplomatic posts
Preceded by Giuseppe Leanza	Apostolic Nuncio to Haiti; 15 January 1992 – 6 April 1995	Succeeded by Christophe Pierre
Preceded by José Sebastián Laboa Gallego	Apostolic Nuncio to Paraguay; 6 April 1995 – 19 June 1999	Succeeded by Antonio Lucibello
Preceded by Georg Zur as Apostolic Pro-Nuncio	Apostolic Nuncio to India; 19 June 1999 – 12 November 2002	Succeeded by Pedro López Quintana
Preceded by Georg Zur as Apostolic Pro-Nuncio	Apostolic Nuncio to Nepal; 23 June 1999 – 12 November 2002	Succeeded by Pedro López Quintana
Preceded by Alfio Rapisarda	Apostolic Nuncio to Brazil; 12 November 2002 – 11 January 2012	Succeeded by Giovanni d'Aniello
Catholic Church titles
Preceded by Manuel Monteiro de Castro	Secretary of the Congregation for Bishops; 11 January 2012 – 21 September 2013	Succeeded by Ilson de Jesus Montanari
Preceded by Manuel Monteiro de Castro	Secretary of the College of Cardinals; 7 March 2012 – 28 January 2014	Succeeded by Ilson de Jesus Montanari
Preceded by Nikola Eterović	Secretary General of the Synod of Bishops; 21 September 2013 – 15 September 2020	Succeeded by Mario Grech
Preceded by Fortunato Baldelli	Cardinal Deacon of Sant'Anselmo all'Aventino; 22 February 2014 – present	Incumbent
