= Pope John Paul II bibliography =

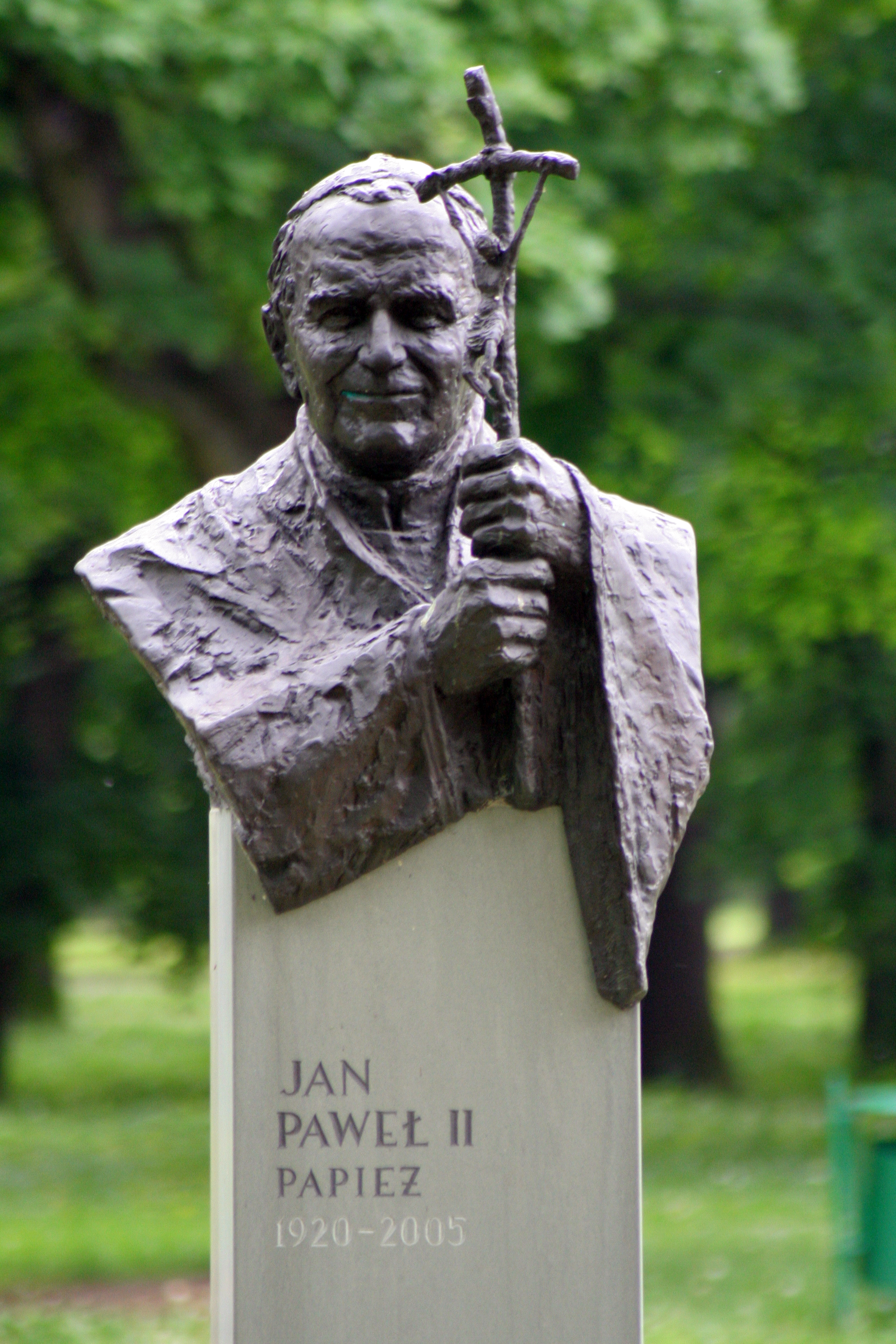
- Books↙: 16
- Plays↙: 7
- Poetry↙: 3
- Audio↙: 15
- Encyclicals↙: 14

The Pope John Paul II bibliography contains a list of works by Pope John Paul II, and works about his life and theology.

Pope John Paul II reigned as pope of the Catholic Church and sovereign of Vatican City for 26 1/2 years (October 1978–April 2005). Works written and published prior to his election to the papacy are attributed to Karol Wojtyła. Additional resources can be found on the Vatican site

== Books ==
The following is a list of books written by John Paul II both before and after becoming pope, although pre-papacy his name was Karol Wojtyla.

- Questio de fide apud S. Joannem a Cruce (The Question of Faith according to St. John of the Cross). Warsaw: Collectanea Theologica. 1950. – This was the author's first doctoral dissertation at the Pontifical University of St. Thomas Aquinas (Angelicum) in Rome.
- An Attempt to Develop a Christian Ethics Based on Max Scheler's System. Jagiellonian University in Krakow, Poland. 1953. – This was the author's habilitation thesis.
- Miłość i odpowiedzialność (Love and Responsibility). Lublin: Sudium etyczne. 1960. – This was the author's first published book, integrating his pastoral experience with young people with a penetrating philosophical analysis of the conditions for true love. The book addresses such issues as attraction, desire, sentiment, sensuality, shame, friendship, and justice toward the Creator.
- Promieniowanie ojcostwa, under a pseudonym Andrzej Jawień, 1964.
- Osoba i czyn (Person and Act). Krakow: Pol. Tow. Teologiczne. 1969. – This is a major philosophical work directed to the person, which involves the use of the metaphysics of St. Thomas Aquinas for all that is objective in man and the phenomenological method for the study of man's personal subjectivity.
- U podstaw odnowy. Studium o realizacji Vaticanum II (Sources of Renewal. Studies on Realizing Vatican II). Krakow: Pol. Tow. Teologiczne. 1972. – This book is a guide to the pastoral synod of the Archdiocese of Kraków in their deliberations, and introduces the reader to the documents of Vatican II and how they can be implemented as a response of faith to God's action through the council.
- The Acting Person: A Contribution to Phenomenological Anthropology. Springer. 1979. ISBN 978-90-277-0969-1. – This is the first English translation of Osoba i czyn.
- Love and Responsibility (1993 ed.). San Francisco: Ignatius Press. 1981. ISBN 978-0-89870-445-7. – This is the first English translation of Miłość i odpowiedzialność. This book analyzes sex, romantic attraction, lust, and spousal love by determining the conditions necessary for true love.
- Person and Community: Selected Essays of Karol Wojtyla, translated by Theresa Sandok. New York: Peter Lang. 1993. ISBN 0-8204-1446-8. – Essays were originally published in Polish between 1955 and 1977. The collection is indispensable for understanding Wojtyla's synthesis of Thomism with phenomenology and for understanding Thomism as Thomistic Personalism.
- The Way to Christ: Spiritual Exercises. New York: HarperSanFrancisco. 1994. ISBN 978-0-06-064216-7. – This book is a conversational presentation of two retreats Karol Wojtyła gave 10 years apart before becoming pope. During that time he served in Kraków as bishop and cardinal.
- Crossing the Threshold of Hope. New York: Knopf. 1995. ISBN 978-0-679-44058-1. – This book presents the author's many teachings and ideas.
- The Theology of the Body: Human Love in the Divine Plan. Boston: Pauline Books & Media. 1997. ISBN 978-0-8198-7394-1. – This book is a compilation of weekly lectures titled Theology of the Body, delivered from 1979 to 1984 to married couples about the deep meaning of human love and sexuality.
- Letters to My Brother Priests: Complete Collection of Holy Thursday Letters (1979-2005), Midwest Theological Forum, Woodridge 2006, 398 pgs. ISBN 1-890177-58-X
- Gift and Mystery: On the Fiftieth Anniversary of My Priestly Ordination. New York: Doubleday. 1996. ISBN 978-0-385-40966-7. – The author's thoughts on the priesthood and how the event of the Incarnation in world history is manifest daily in the lives of priests who have been chosen to follow in His footsteps.
- Pope John Paul II: In My Own Words. New York: Gramercy. 2002. ISBN 978-0-517-22084-9. – This book is a carefully selected compilation of words and prayers of the author, compiled by Anthony F. Chiffolo.
- Roman Triptych (Meditation) – 6 March (2003), in Italy published by Libreria Editrice Vaticana ISBN 88-209-7451-7
- Rise, Let Us Be On Our Way, Warner Books (28 September 2004), ISBN 0-446-57781-2, mostly addressed to his bishops, although it has been used as source of inspiration for others having knowledge of Christianity.
- Memory and Identity – Conversations at the Dawn of a Millennium, published by Rizzoli (22 March 2005) ISBN 0-8478-2761-5, conversational presentation of John Paul II's views on many secular topics, such as evil, freedom, contemporary Europe, nationalism, and democracy. Included in the book is also a transcript of the Pope's discussion of his assassination attempt in 1981.
- Man and Woman He Created Them: A Theology of the Body [John Paul II; Translated by Dr. Michael Waldstein] Pauline Books & Media, 2006. ISBN 0-8198-7421-3, a new translation in English created from the newly discovered original Polish work written by John Paul II
- (Promulgated by Pope John Paul II), Catecismo de la Iglesia Catolica, Doubleday, 2006. ISBN 978-0-385-51650-1
- Teachings for an Unbelieving World: Newly Discovered Reflections on Paul's Sermon at the Areopagus. Ave Maria Press. March 20, 2020. p. 160. ISBN 9781594719851.

== Plays ==
The following is a list of plays written by Pope John Paul II.

- David (Note: According to Pope John Paul II's translator, Bolesław Taborski, no copy has been found.)
- Job
- Jeremiah
- The Jeweler's Shop: A Meditation on the Sacrament of Matrimony, Passing on Occasion into a Drama, Arrow, (17 March 1980) ISBN 0-09-140861-X.
- Our God's Brother, Ave Maria Press (1995) ISBN 0-87793-870-9, play written by Karol Wojtyła in Poland during World War II at a time when Nazis were suppressing Polish culture (1944).
- The Jeweller's Shop (Italian: La bottega dell'orefice), 88 min (Canada) / 95 min (USA), 1988, colour, directed by Michael Joseph Anderson. (Note: This play was also filmed.)
- Our God's brother (in Polish: Brat naszego Boga), 123 min, 1997, colour, directed by Krzysztof Zanussi. (Note: This play was also filmed.)

== Poetry ==
The following is a list of books of poetry written by Pope John Paul II.

- The Place Within: The Poetry of Pope John Paul II, Random House; 1st edition (25 October 1994) ISBN 0-679-76064-4, lyrical poetry
- Roman Triptych. Meditations, Libreria Editrice Vaticana, (Vatican) March 2003), ISBN 88-209-7451-7
- The Poetry of Pope John Paul II, USCCB (1 September 2003) ISBN 1-57455-556-1, poems written in the summer of 2002.

== Audio ==
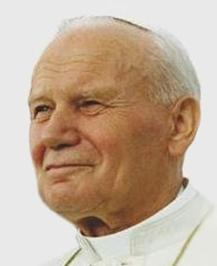
Pope John Paul II

The following is a list of audio recordings produced by Pope John Paul II.

- Sings at the Festival of Sacrosong (1979), Infinity Entertainment Group
- Rosario del Papa (1994), Max Music & Entertainment
- Rosario (1994), ISR Records (Spanish)
- A Celebration of Mass (1995), BMG Video
- El Santo Rosario (1995), Sony Music Distribution
- Pope of the Rosary (1995), Trinity Records (English, Spanish)
- Der Papst in Paderborn (1996), Titan (German)
- Abbà Pater (1999), Sony Music Distribution (Note: This album was recorded for the Great Jubilee.)
- Pope John Paul II (2000), Gateway
- Papal Blessing/Ave Maria (2000), Gateway Records
- Du Bist Petrus (2000), Universal Music
- Orbi Millennium (2003), Beaux
- Piesni Polakow dla Papieza (2004), GM Recordings
- Papst Johannes Paul II in Deutschland (2005), Sonia
- Die Helligen Vater in Deustschland (2005), Delta Distribution

== Encyclicals ==
Pope John Paul II issued 14 Papal encyclicals during his reign as Pope of the Catholic Church for over 26 years, from his election on 16 October 1978 until his death on 2 April 2005. Encyclicals (from Latin encyclia, from the Greek "en kyklo, ἐν κύκλῳ", meaning "general" or "encircling") were originally circular letters sent to all the churches of a particular area in the early Christian church.

For the modern Catholic Church, a papal encyclical, in the strictest sense, is a letter sent by the Pope which is explicitly addressed to Catholic bishops of a particular area or to the world, usually treating some aspect of Catholic doctrine. A papal encyclical is generally used for significant issues, and is second in importance only to the highest ranking document now issued by popes, an Apostolic Constitution.

The title of a Papal Encyclical is usually taken from its first few words. Pope John Paul II issued his first encyclical, Redemptor hominis, on 4 March 1979. Ecclesia de Eucharistia, his last encyclical, was issued on 17 April 2003.

No.	Title		Subject	Date
No.	Latin	English translation	Subject	Date
1.	Redemptor hominis	"The Redeemer of Man"	On Jesus' Redemption of the world; the central importance of the human person; the Pope's plan of governance	4 March 1979
2.	Dives in misericordia	"Rich in Mercy"	On God's mercy given to the Church and the world	30 November 1980
3.	Laborem exercens	"On Human Work"	On the 90th anniversary of Pope Leo XIII's encyclical Rerum novarum; the conflict of labour and capital, and the rights of workers	14 September 1981
4.	Slavorum Apostoli	"The Apostles of the Slavs"	In commemoration of Saints Cyril and Methodius	2 June 1985
5.	Dominum et vivificantem	"The Lord and Giver of Life"	On the Holy Spirit in the life of the Church and the world	18 May 1986
6.	Redemptoris Mater	"Mother of the Redeemer"	On the Blessed Virgin Mary in the life of the pilgrim Church	25 March 1987
7.	Sollicitudo rei socialis	"On Social Concerns"	On the 20th anniversary of Pope Paul VI's encyclical Populorum progressio; on the social concerns and teachings of the Church	30 December 1987
8.	Redemptoris missio	"Mission of the Redeemer"	On the permanent validity of the Church's missionary mandate	7 December 1990
9.	Centesimus annus	"The Hundredth Year"	On the 100th anniversary of Rerum novarum; on capital and labour; and on Catholic social teaching	1 May 1991
10.	Veritatis splendor	"The Splendor of Truth"	On fundamental questions of the Church's moral teaching	6 August 1993
11.	Evangelium vitae	"The Gospel of Life"	On the value and inviolability of human life	25 March 1995
12.	Ut unum sint	"That They May Be One"	On commitment to ecumenism	25 May 1995
13.	Fides et ratio	"Faith and Reason"	On the relationship between faith and reason; condemning both atheism and faith unsupported by reason; affirming the place of reason and philosophy in religion	14 September 1998
14.	Ecclesia de Eucharistia	"The Church of the Eucharist"	On the Eucharist in its relationship to the Church	17 April 2003

== Apostolic exhortations ==
- Apostolic Exhortations of John Paul II from the Vatican
- Apostolic Exhortations of John Paul II from ETWN

=== Notable exhortations ===
Notable Apostolic Exhortations of Pope John Paul II include:

- Catechesi Tradendae (Catechesis in Our Time, 1979)
- Christifideles laici (Christ's Faithful People, 1988)
- Ecclesia in America (The Church in America, 1999)
- Ecclesia in Asia (The Church in Asia, 1999)
- Ecclesia in Europa (The Church in Europe)
- Familiaris consortio (The Christian Family in the Modern World, 1981)
- Pastores dabo vobis (Shepherds After My Own Heart (on priestly formation), 1992)
- Pastores gregis (The Shepherds of the Lord's Flock, 2003)
- Reconciliatio et paenitentia (Reconciliation and Penance, 1984)
- Redemptoris custos (Guardian of the Redeemer (On the person and mission of Saint Joseph), 1989)
- Vita consecrata (Consecrated Life, 1996)

== Apostolic letters ==
- Christifideles Laici: The Lay Members of Christ's Faithful People, 1988. Christifideles laici explains the urgent indispensability of the laity to bring God's love into the world.
- Dies Domini - Dies Domini is an apostolic letter promulgated by Pope John Paul II on July 30, 1998. In this document, Pope John Paul encourages the Catholic population to 'rediscover the meaning' behind keeping the Lord's Day holy.
- Mulieris Dignitatem: On the Dignity and Vocation of Women on the Occasion of the Marian Year, 1988. Mulieris Dignitatem defends the equality of women, the vocation to love, the mutual submission of husbands and wives, the on-going impact of Original Sin on male/female relationships, Jesus's modeling of how to treat women, the significance of Jesus's mother for today's Christians, and the nature of the relationship between Christ and His Church including the role of the Eucharist as expressing the total self-gift of Christ and making possible the reciprocal total self-gift of the recipient.
- Novo millennio ineunte- (At the beginning of the new millennium) is an apostolic letter of Pope John Paul II, addressed to the Bishops Clergy and Lay Faithful, "At the Close of the Great Jubilee of 2000".
- Ordinatio sacerdotalis
- Salvifici doloris "Redemptive Suffering"
- Apostolic Letters of John Paul II from Vatican web site
- Apostolic Letters of John Paul II from EWTN (Selected letters)
- The Rapid Development - The Rapid Development (Il Rapido Sviluppo) is an apostolic letter written by Pope John Paul II in 2005 to those who are involved in communications.
- Rosarium Virginis Mariae - letter from 2002 proclaiming a "Year of the Rosary" and introducing the Luminous Mysteries.

== Apostolic constitutions ==
- Ut sit (1982) Pope John Paul II's Apostolic Constitution raising Opus Dei (Latin for "The Work of God") to the rank of a Personal Prelature (similar to a diocese, but grouping people by some peculiar pastoral reason instead of by where they live)
- Sacrae Disciplinae Leges (1983) Pope John Paul II's constitution instituting the 1983 Code of Canon Law
- Pastor Bonus (1988) — Pope John Paul II's rules on the re-organisation of the Roman Curia
- Ex corde ecclesiae (1990) — John Paul II's rules on Catholic universities
- Fidei depositum (1992) Pope John Paul II's Apostolic Constitution on the new Catechism of the Catholic Church
- Universi Dominici gregis (1996)—Pope John Paul II's rules on electing the Roman Pontiff (the Pope)

== Pastoral letters ==
- Letter to Children, 1994
- Letter to Families (Gratissima Sane), 1994
- Letter to Priest, 1994
- Letter to the Secretary General of the International Conference on Population and Development, 1994
- Letter to Women, 1995
- Link to other letters on the Vatican website
