= Theology of Pope John Paul II =

Doctrinal and philosophical teachings of John Paul II

As pope, John Paul II wrote 14 papal encyclicals and taught regularly in his general audiences.

Some key elements of his strategy to "reposition the Catholic Church" were encyclicals such as Ecclesia de Eucharistia, Reconciliatio et paenitentia and Redemptoris Mater. In his At the beginning of the new millennium (Novo Millennio Ineunte), he emphasised the importance of "starting afresh from Christ": "No, we shall not be saved by a formula but by a Person." In The Splendour of the Truth (Veritatis Splendor), he emphasised the dependence of man on God and His Law ("Without the Creator, the creature disappears") and the "dependence of freedom on the truth". He warned that man "giving himself over to relativism and scepticism, goes off in search of an illusory freedom apart from truth itself". In Fides et Ratio (On the Relationship between Faith and Reason) John Paul promoted a renewed interest in philosophy and an autonomous pursuit of truth in theological matters. Drawing on many different sources (such as Thomism), he described the mutually supporting relationship between faith and reason, and emphasised that theologians should focus on that relationship. John Paul II wrote extensively about workers and the social doctrine of the church, which he discussed in three encyclicals: Laborem exercens, Sollicitudo rei socialis, and Centesimus annus. Through his encyclicals and many Apostolic Letters and Exhortations, John Paul II talked about the dignity and the equality of women. He argued for the importance of the family for the future of humanity. He taught about sexuality in what is referred as the "Theology of the Body". Other encyclicals include The Gospel of Life (Evangelium Vitae) and Ut unum sint (That They May Be One). Though critics accused him of inflexibility in explicitly re-asserting Catholic moral teachings against abortion and euthanasia that have been in place for well over a thousand years, he urged a more nuanced view of capital punishment. In his second encyclical, Dives in misericordia, he stressed that divine mercy is the greatest feature of God, needed especially in modern times.

== Spirituality ==
John Paul II spoke often about prayer and devotion to God, such devotion deeply rooted in the Mystery of the Blessed Trinity. Pope Francis included John Paul's reflections on the Sacred Heart of Jesus in his overview of this devotion within the history of Catholic spirituality, reflecting John Paul's personal recollection that of the place which the Sacred Heart had played in his life "ever since my youth".

== Social and political stances ==
Love for God and love for neighbour defined John Paul II's social thinking. Within this context, the reality of human sin has impacted on the world. He referred to both "personal sin" and "social sin", for example in his post-synodal exhortation on reconciliation and penance in 1984.

He was considered a conservative on doctrine and issues relating to human sexual reproduction and the ordination of women. While he was visiting the United States in 1977, the year before becoming pope, Wojtyła said: "All human life, from the moments of conception and through all subsequent stages, is sacred."

A series of 129 lectures given by John Paul II during his Wednesday audiences in Rome between September 1979 and November 1984 were later compiled and published as a single work titled Theology of the Body, an extended meditation on human sexuality. He extended it to the condemnation of abortion, euthanasia, and virtually all capital punishment, calling them all a part of a struggle between a "culture of life" and a "culture of death". He campaigned for world debt forgiveness and social justice. He coined the term "social mortgage", which related that all private property had a social dimension, namely that "the goods of this world are originally meant for all". In 2000, he publicly endorsed the Jubilee 2000 campaign on African debt relief fronted by Irish rock stars Bob Geldof and Bono, once famously interrupting a U2 recording session by telephoning the studio and asking to speak to Bono.

John Paul II, who was present and very influential at the 1962–65 Second Vatican Council, affirmed the teachings of that Council and did much to implement them. Nevertheless, his critics often wished that he would embrace what has been called a progressive agenda that some hoped would evolve as a result of the council. In fact, the Council did not advocate progressive changes in these areas; for example, they still condemned abortion as an unspeakable crime. John Paul II continued to declare that contraception, abortion, and homosexual acts were gravely sinful, and, along with Joseph Ratzinger (future Pope Benedict XVI), initially opposed liberation theology.

Following the church's exaltation of the marital act of sexual intercourse between a baptised man and woman within sacramental marriage as proper and exclusive to the sacrament of marriage, John Paul II believed that it was, in every instance, profaned by contraception, abortion, divorce followed by a 'second' marriage, and by homosexual acts.

=== Apartheid in South Africa ===
John Paul II was an outspoken opponent of apartheid in South Africa. In 1985, while visiting the Netherlands, he gave an impassioned speech condemning apartheid at the International Court of Justice, proclaiming that "No system of apartheid or separate development will ever be acceptable as a model for the relations between peoples or races." In September 1988, John Paul II made a pilgrimage to ten Southern African countries, including those bordering South Africa, while demonstratively avoiding South Africa. During his visit to Zimbabwe, John Paul II called for economic sanctions against South Africa's government. After John Paul II's death, both Nelson Mandela and Archbishop Desmond Tutu praised the pope for defending human rights and condemning economic injustice.

=== Persian Gulf War ===
Between 1990 and 1991, a 34-nation coalition led by the United States waged a war against Saddam Hussein's Iraq, which had invaded and annexed Kuwait. John Paul II was a staunch opponent of the Gulf War. Throughout the conflict, he appealed to the international community to stop the war, and after it was over led diplomatic initiatives to negotiate peace in the Middle East. In his 1991 encyclical Centesimus annus, John Paul II harshly condemned the conflict:

"No, never again war, which destroys the lives of innocent people, teaches how to kill, throws into upheaval even the lives of those who do the killing and leaves behind a trail of resentment and hatred, thus making it all the more difficult to find a just solution of the very problems which provoked the war."

In April 1991, during his Urbi et Orbi Sunday message at St. Peter's Basilica, John Paul II called for the international community to "lend an ear" to "the long-ignored aspirations of oppressed peoples". He specifically named the Kurds, a people who were fighting a civil war against Saddam Hussein's troops in Iraq, as one such people, and referred to the war as a "darkness menacing the earth". During this time, the Vatican had expressed its frustration with the international ignoring of the pope's calls for peace in the Middle East.

=== Iraq War ===
In 2003 John Paul II criticised the 2003 United States-led invasion of Iraq, saying in his State of the World address "No to war! War is not always inevitable. It is always a defeat for humanity." He sent Cardinal Pio Laghi, the former Apostolic Pro-Nuncio to the United States, to talk with George W. Bush, the US president, to express opposition to the war. John Paul II said that it was up to the United Nations to solve the international conflict through diplomacy and that a unilateral aggression is a crime against peace and a violation of international law. The pope's opposition to the Iraq War led to him being a candidate to win the 2003 Nobel Peace Prize, which was ultimately awarded to Iranian attorney/judge and noted human rights advocate Shirin Ebadi.

=== European Union ===
John Paul II pushed for a reference to Europe's Christian cultural roots in the draft of the European Constitution. In his 2003 apostolic exhortation Ecclesia in Europa, John Paul II wrote that he "fully (respected) the secular nature of (European) institutions". However, he wanted the constitution to enshrine religious rights, including acknowledging the rights of religious groups to organise freely, recognise the specific identity of each denomination and allow for a "structured dialogue" between each religious community and the European Union (EU), and extend across the EU the legal status enjoyed by religious institutions in individual member states. John Paul II said: "I wish once more to appeal to those drawing up the future European Constitutional Treaty so that it will include a reference to the religion and in particular to the Christian heritage of Europe." The pope's desire for a reference to Europe's Christian identity in the EU Constitution was supported by non-Catholic representatives of the Church of England and Eastern Orthodox Churches from Russia, Romania, and Greece. John Paul II's demand to include a reference to Europe's Christian roots in the European Constitution was supported by some non-Christians, such as Joseph Weiler, a practising Orthodox Jew and renowned constitutional lawyer, who said that the EU Constitution's lack of a reference to Christianity was not a "demonstration of neutrality" but rather "a Jacobin attitude".

At the same time, John Paul II was an enthusiastic supporter of European integration; in particular, he supported his native Poland's entry into the bloc. On 19 May 2003, three weeks before a referendum was held in Poland on EU membership, the Polish pope addressed his compatriots and urged them to vote for Poland's EU membership at St. Peter's Square in Vatican City State. While some conservative, Catholic politicians in Poland opposed EU membership, John Paul II said:

"I know that there are many in opposition to integration. I appreciate their concern about maintaining the cultural and religious identity of our nation. However, I must emphasise that Poland has always been an important part of Europe. Europe needs Poland. The Church in Europe needs the Poles' testimony of faith. Poland needs Europe."

The Polish pope compared Poland's entry into the EU to the Union of Lublin, which was signed in 1569 and united the Kingdom of Poland and the Grand Duchy of Lithuania into one nation and created an elective monarchy.

=== Organised crime ===
John Paul II was the first pontiff to denounce Mafia violence in Southern Italy. In 1993, during a pilgrimage to Agrigento, Sicily, he appealed to the Mafiosi: "I say to those responsible: 'Convert! One day, the judgement of God will arrive!'" In 1994, John Paul II visited Catania and told victims of Mafia violence to "rise up and cloak yourself in light and justice!"

In 1995, the Mafia bombed two historical churches in Rome. Some commentators, including the Florence prosecutor Pierluigi Vigna, believed that this was the mob's vendetta against the pope for his denunciations of organised crime.

=== Rwandan genocide ===
In 1990, during the civil war between Tutsis and Hutus in the mostly Catholic country of Rwanda, John Paul II called for a ceasefire and condemned the persecution of the Tutsis. In 1994, he was the first world leader to condemn the massacre of the Tutsis as a genocide. In 1995, during his third visit to Kenya before an audience of 300,000, John Paul II pleaded for an end to the violence in Rwanda and Burundi, urging forgiveness and reconciliation as a solution to the genocide. He told Rwandan and Burundian refugees that he "was close to them and shared their immense pain". He said:

"What is happening in your countries is a terrible tragedy that must end. During the African Synod, we, the pastors of the church, felt the duty to express our consternation and to launch an appeal for forgiveness and reconciliation. This is the only way to dissipate the threats of ethnocentrism that are hovering over Africa these days and that have so brutally touched Rwanda and Burundi."

== Capital punishment ==
John Paul II was an outspoken opponent of the death penalty, which was a break from previous popes regarding the practise. At a papal Mass in St. Louis, Missouri, in the United States, he said:

"A sign of hope is the increasing recognition that the dignity of human life must never be taken away, even in the case of someone who has done great evil. Modern society has the means of protecting itself, without definitively denying criminals the chance to reform. I renew the appeal I made most recently at Christmas for a consensus to end the death penalty, which is both cruel and unnecessary."

During that visit, John Paul II convinced the then governor of Missouri, Mel Carnahan, to commute the death sentence of convicted murderer Darrell J. Mease to life imprisonment without parole. John Paul II's other attempts to commute the sentences of death-row inmates were unsuccessful. In 1983, John Paul II visited Guatemala and unsuccessfully asked the country's president, Efraín Ríos Montt, to commute the sentence for six left-wing guerrillas sentenced to death.

In 2002, John Paul II again travelled to Guatemala. At that time, Guatemala was one of only two countries in Latin America (the other being Cuba) to apply capital punishment. John Paul II asked the Guatemalan president, Alfonso Portillo, for a moratorium on executions.

== Ordination ==
In 1994, John Paul II asserted the church's lack of authority to ordain women to the priesthood, stating that without such authority ordination is not legitimately compatible with fidelity to Christ. This was also deemed a repudiation of calls to break with the constant tradition of the church by ordaining women to the priesthood.

He also chose not to end the discipline of mandatory priestly celibacy, although in a small number of unusual circumstances, he did allow certain married clergymen of other Christian traditions who later became Catholic to be ordained as Catholic priests.

== Environment and ecology ==
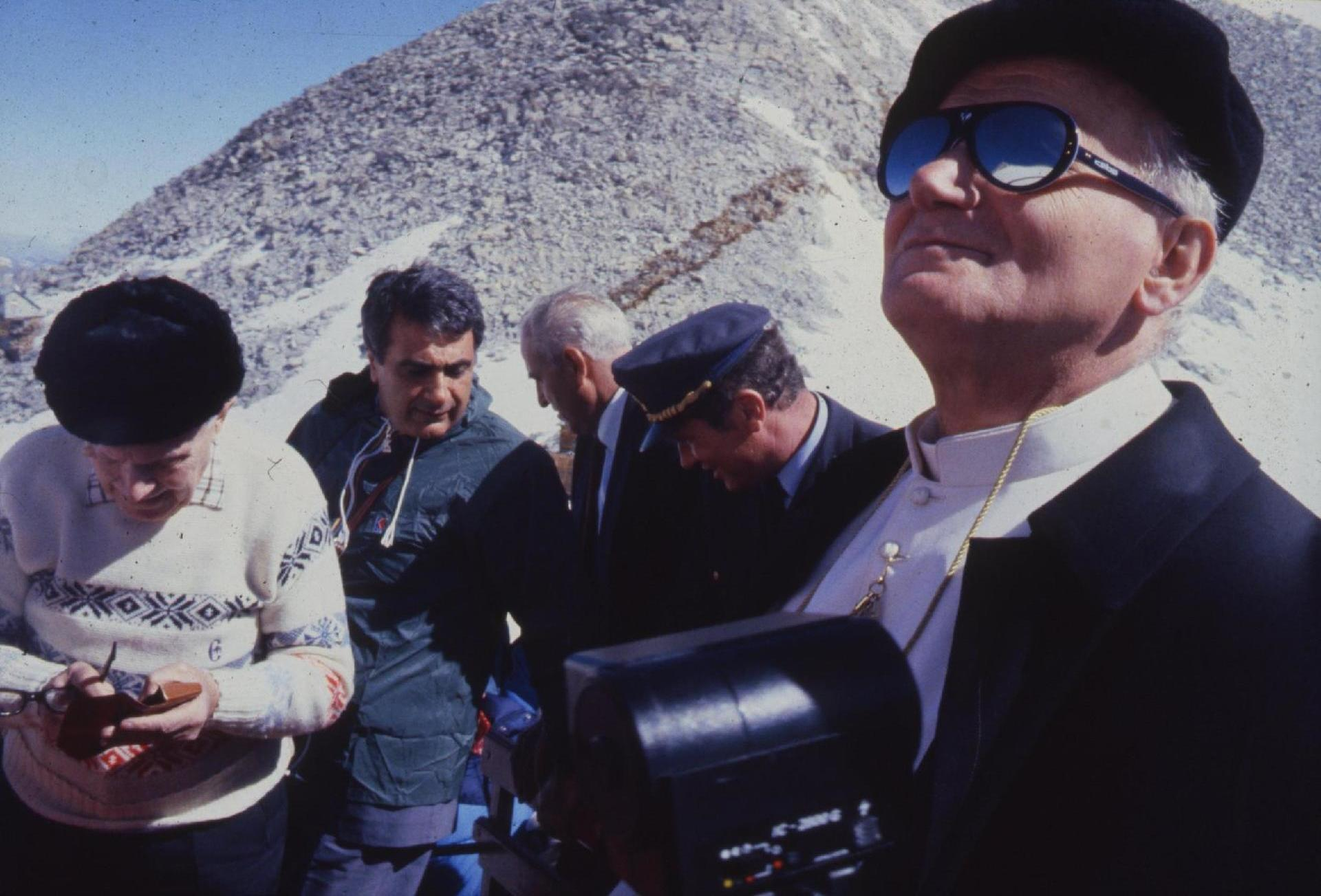
Pope John Paul II on the peak of Mount Adamello in the Adamello-Presanella Alps

John Paul II taught on the environmental health of Earth that "humanity has disappointed God's expectations ... degrading that 'flowerbed' which is the earth, our dwelling-place". His phrase and exhortation, "ecological conversion", which was used in a general audience at the Vatican in 2001, has been widely adopted, for example in the Mandate for Catholic Earthcare Australia, and in the writings of Pope Francis.

== Evolution ==
On 22 October 1996, in a speech to the Pontifical Academy of Sciences plenary session at the Vatican, John Paul II said of evolution that "this theory has been progressively accepted by researchers, following a series of discoveries in various fields of knowledge. The convergence, neither sought nor fabricated, of the results of work that was conducted independently is in itself a significant argument in favour of this theory." John Paul II's embrace of evolution was enthusiastically praised by American palaeontologist and evolutionary biologist Stephen Jay Gould, with whom he had an audience in 1984.

Although generally accepting the theory of evolution, John Paul II made one major exception—the human soul, saying: "If the human body has its origin in living material which pre-exists it, the spiritual soul is immediately created by God."

== Liberation theology ==
In 1984 and 1986, through Cardinal Ratzinger (future Pope Benedict XVI) as Prefect of the Congregation for the Doctrine of the Faith, John Paul II officially condemned aspects of liberation theology, which had many followers in Latin America.

Visiting Europe, Salvadoran Archbishop Óscar Romero unsuccessfully advocated for the Vatican to condemn the right-wing military regime of El Salvador, for violations of human rights during the Salvadoran Civil War and the support of death squads. Though Romero expressed his frustration at working with clergy who cooperated with the government, John Paul II encouraged him to maintain episcopal unity as a top priority.

In his travel to Managua, Nicaragua in 1983, John Paul II harshly condemned what he dubbed the "popular Church", referencing the ecclesial base communities supported by the Latin American Episcopal Conference, and the Nicaraguan clergy's tendencies to support the leftist Sandinistas, reminding the clergy of their duties of obedience to the Holy See. During that visit Ernesto Cardenal, a priest and minister in the Sandinista government, knelt to kiss his hand. John Paul withdrew it, wagged his finger in Cardenal's face, and told him, "You must straighten out your position with the church."

However, in March 1986, the Vatican published an Instruction on the subject in which, while warning against reducing "the salvific dimension of liberation to the socio-ethical dimension which is a consequence of it," it supported "the special option for the poor" favored by the liberation theologians, and described the Basic Christian Communities which they had promoted as "a source of great hope for the church." A few weeks later, the pope himself seemed to endorse the movement when he wrote to the Brazilian bishops that as long as it is in harmony with the teaching of the Church, "we are convinced, we and you, that the theology of liberation is not only timely but useful and necessary. It should constitute a new state-- in close connection with the former ones—of theological reflection."

== Sexuality ==
John Paul II issued a series of addresses on human sexuality between 1979 and 1984 entitled Theology of the Body, analyzing the theological significance of the body, sexuality, marriage, celibacy, and virginity.

In 1986, the Pope approved the release of a document from the Congregation for the Doctrine of the Faith entitled Letter to the Bishops of the Catholic Church on the Pastoral Care of Homosexual Persons. This document reaffirms the historical teaching of the Catholic Church on homosexuality with instructions for pastoral care.

In his book Memory and Identity, he referred to the "strong pressures" by the European Parliament to recognise homosexual unions as an alternative type of family, with the right to adopt children. In the book, as quoted by Reuters, he wrote: "It is legitimate and necessary to ask oneself if this is not perhaps part of a new ideology of evil, more subtle and hidden, perhaps, intent upon exploiting human rights themselves against man and against the family."
