= Catechesis =

Christian religious education

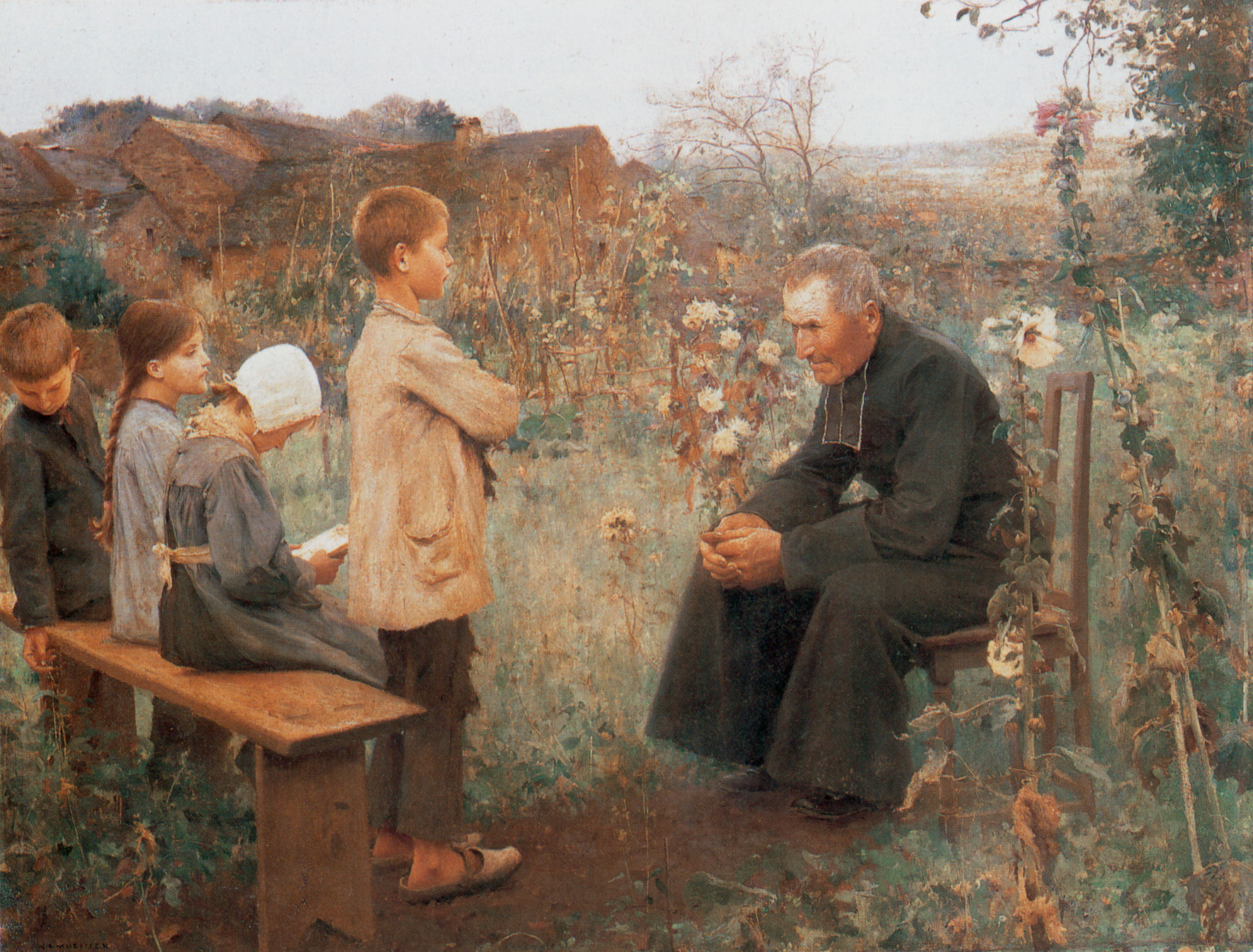
The Catechism Lesson by Jules-Alexis Meunier

Catechesis (/ˌkætəˈkiːsɪs/; from Greek: κατήχησις, 'instruction by word of mouth', generally 'instruction') is basic Christian religious education of children and adults, often from a catechism book. It started as education of converts to Christianity, but as the religion became institutionalized, catechesis was used for education of members who had been baptized as infants. As defined in the Catechism of the Catholic Church, paragraph 5 (quoting Pope John Paul II's Apostolic Exhortation Catechesi tradendae, §18):

Catechesis is an education in the faith of children, young people and adults which includes especially the teaching of Christian doctrine imparted, generally speaking, in an organic and systematic way, with a view to initiating the hearers into the fullness of Christian life.

== Nomenclature ==
In the Catholic Church, catechist is a term used of anyone engaged in religious formation and education, from the bishop to lay ecclesial ministers and clergy to volunteers at the local level. The primary catechists for children are their parents or communities. Protestant churches typically have Sunday School classes for educating children in religion, as well as adult classes for continuing education.

In ecclesiology, a catechumen (/ˌkætɪˈkjuːmən, -mɛn/; via Latin catechumenus from Greek κατηχούμενος katēkhoumenos, "one being instructed", from κατά kata, "down" and ἦχος ēkhos, "sound") is a person receiving instruction from a catechist in the principles of the Christian religion with a view to baptism. The title and practice is most often used by Anglican, Lutheran, Methodist, Orthodox, Reformed/Presbyterian, and Roman Catholic Christians. Ecumenical organisations such as the North American Association for the Catechumenate are helping across several denominations to "shape ministries with adult seekers involving an extended time of faith formation and a meaningful experience of adult baptism at Easter."

== Historic Christian practice ==
The word catechumen comes from the passive form of the Greek word κατηχέω (katēcheō), which is used seven times in the New Testament. In the passive, it means "to be instructed, informed."

The catechumenate slowly developed from the development of doctrine and the need to test converts against the dangers of falling away. The Bible records (Acts 19) that the Apostle Paul, while visiting some people who were described as "disciples", established they had received the baptism of John for the repentance of sins but had not yet heard of or received the Holy Spirit. Further, from the second century it appears that baptisms were held only at certain times of year, indicating that periods of instruction were the rule rather than the exception. The Catholic Encyclopedia notes: "As the acceptance of Christianity involved belief in a body of doctrine and the observance of the Divine law ("teach, make disciples, scholars of them"; "teaching them to observe all things whatever I have commanded you", Matthew 28:20 [see Great Commission]), it is clear that some sort of preliminary instruction must have been given to the converts." See also Council of Jerusalem. Justin Martyr, in his First Apology, cites instruction as occurring prior to baptism:

As many as are persuaded and believe that what we teach and say is true, and undertake to be able to live accordingly, are instructed to pray and to entreat God with fasting, for the remission of their sins that are past, we praying and fasting with them. Then they are brought by us where there is water, and are regenerated in the same manner in which we were ourselves regenerated.

The "persuasion" would be carried out by the preaching of an evangelist; but since belief must precede baptism, the person concerned should be prepared spiritually to receive the indwelling of the Holy Spirit through baptism. That person would receive the sign of the Cross and possibly aspersion with holy water from a minister, indicating their entry to the state of catechumen.

In the early church, catechumens were instructed (catechized) in the basic elements of the faith such as the Apostles' Creed, Lord's Prayer, and sacraments in preparation for baptism. Catechumens were limited as to their attendance in formal services. As unbaptized, they could not actively take part in any service, for that was reserved for those baptized. One practice permitted them to remain in the first part of the mass, but even in the earliest centuries dismissed them before the Eucharist. Others had them entering through a side door, or observing from the side, from a gallery, or near the font; while it was not unknown to bar them from all services until baptized.

Their desire for baptism was held to be sufficient guarantee of their salvation, if they died before the reception. In event of their martyrdom prior to baptism by water, this was held to be a "baptism by blood", and they were honored as martyrs.

In the fourth century, a widespread practice arose of enrolling as a catechumen and deferring baptism for years, often until shortly before death, and when so ill that the normal practice of immersion was impossible, so that aspersion or affusion—the baptism of the sick—was necessary. Constantine was the most prominent of these catechumens. See also Deathbed conversion.

During the fourth and fifth centuries, baptism had become a several-week-long rite leading up to the baptism on Easter. During this time, catechumens attended several meetings of intensive catechetical preaching, often by the bishop himself, and often accompanied by special prayers, exorcisms, and other rites. Catechumens recited the Apostles' Creed on Holy Saturday to show that one had completed catechetical instruction. By the sixth century, most of those presented for baptism were infants, and pre-baptismal catechesis was abandoned. The decline of preaching and education in general following the barbarian invasions also affected the decline of catechesis. Later, instructors (catechists) would teach Christians who had been baptized as children, to prepare for practicing the religion as thinking persons, both older children and adults. The term, catechism, used for a manual for this instruction, appeared in the Late Middle Ages. During this time the instruction was also expanded to include memorization of the Lord's Prayer and Apostles' Creed. Some clergy probably provided expositions of this material in addition to the Ten Commandments. The main function of catechesis during this period was preparation for confession by enabling the Christian to identify their sins.

Cyril of Jerusalem wrote a series of sermons aimed at catechumens, outlining via passages of scripture the main points of the faith, yet dividing between those merely interested and those intending baptism then continuing with certain sermons aimed at those who had been baptized.

St. Augustine was among those enrolled as a catechumen as an infant, and did not receive baptism until he was in his thirties. He, and other Fathers, fulminated against the practice.

== Medieval ==
Catholics were required to be able to recite the common Latin prayers of the Church (the Pater Noster, the Creed, the Ave Maria) and to explain them in their own languages; and they were used as prayers replacing folk charms.

Priests were required to re-state these catechetical basics in the sermons on feast days: the common prayers, the New Commandment, the Ten Commandments, the seven virtues, the seven deadly sins, etc. Books were circulated among preachers with model sermon cycles around these prayers and themes;

Godparents were supposed to ensure that their godchildren had been taught the prayers, creed, commandments, etc., as part of the godparents' promises made at baptism.

Priests were supposed to check that the confessing person could recite the prayers and commandments, and explain the lines as part of confession (which from 1215 was required of Catholics at least one per year by the 4th Lateran Council). A common medieval vernacular book was the form of confession which allowed the layperson to remind themselves of what they might be quizzed on.

Jean Gerson's L'ABC des simples gens was an important catechetical work published at the advent of the printing press. Along with Gerson's other catechetical works, it addressed the unique problems of teaching the faith to children. Sixteenth-century Christian humanists considered the reform of catechesis to be a high priority.Bishop of Basel Christoph von Utenheim, in one of the most successful efforts to revive catechesis, worked to have regular catechetical preaching instituted throughout his diocese. Johann Geiler von Kaisersberg was another popular preacher who followed the tradition of Gerson by preaching on the basics of the faith.

== Reformation ==
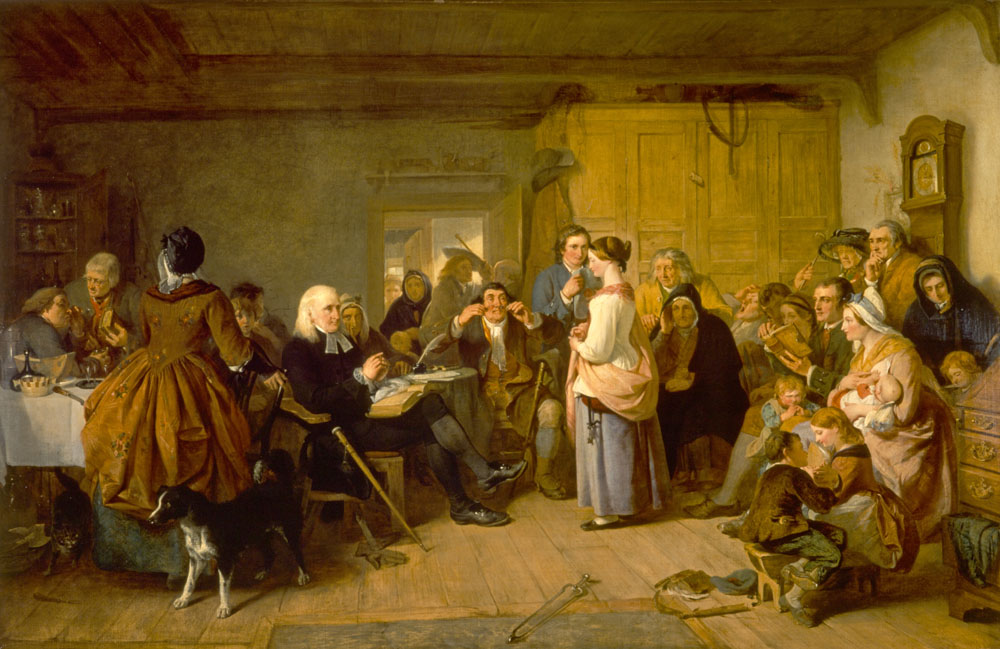
Presbyterian Catechising, painting by John Phillip

During the Protestant Reformation, the Reformers insisted that the Lord's Prayer and other forms be memorized in the vernacular languages of the people, rather than in Latin as was the practice among Roman Catholics. They wanted individuals to be able to fully understand the prayers. (Similarly, worship services were conducted in vernacular languages and Bibles and prayer books printed in vernacular editions.) The use of a question-and-answer format was popularized by reformer Martin Luther in his 1529 Small Catechism. He wanted the catechumen to understand what he was learning, so the Decalogue, Lord's Prayer, and Apostles' Creed were divided into small sections, with each followed by the question "What does this mean?"

Erasmus responded with his own Catholic catechism in 1530 in Latin, which was translated to English for as A Playne and Godly Exposition or Declaration of the Commune Crede.

== Present-day Christian practice ==
=== Catholic church ===
The Roman Catholic Church revived the catechumenate with its Rite of Christian Initiation for Adults (RCIA) wherein being a catechumen is one of a number of stages leading to receiving the sacraments of initiation (baptism, confirmation, and the Eucharist). This was a result of the Second Vatican Council, explicitly stated in point 64 of the Constitution of the Sacred Liturgy, Sacrosanctum Concilium:

The catechumenate for adults, comprising several distinct steps, is to be restored and to be taken into use at the discretion of the local ordinary. By this means the time of the catechumenate, which is intended as a period of suitable instruction, may be sanctified by sacred rites to be celebrated at successive intervals of time.

The Neocatechumenal Way and the Light-Life Movement of the Roman Catholic Church take as their inspiration the old catechumenate of early Christianity (the "primitive church") as the basis for their goal of adult faith formation for Roman Catholics.

The breadth of the Christian heritage, including the diversity of rites within the church, should be included within a programme of catechetical education. Pope Francis has noted that there is a place within catechesis for environmental or ecological education.

In no case is a catechumen absolutely bound to be baptized, preserving the principle that the recipient of a sacrament must not be forced against his will; the person concerned must be drawn spiritually to the faith in addition to being intellectually persuaded.

=== Protestant practice ===
The Protestant Churches who baptize infants, for instance Lutheran and Anglican/Episcopalian, tend to follow a catechumenate which can be likened to a course in the fundamentals of the religion, lasting typically six months and ending with baptism at Easter. However, this is at the discretion of the local minister, and times may be varied.

In the United States, The Probationer's Catechism (1883), also called The Probationer's Handbook, was widely used for many years to guide the training of probationary members of the Methodist Episcopal Church seeking full membership. This catechism typically followed the same six month principle.

The ninth meeting of the Anglican Consultative Council, held in Cape Town in January 1993, stated among other points in Resolution 44:

that the Provinces be encouraged to restore the catechumenate, or discipling process, to help enquiries move to Christian faith, using the witness and support of lay people, and liturgically celebrating the stages of growth.

In those Protestant denominations that do not baptise infants, such as the Conservative Anabaptist Churches, the catechumenate status may be considered the norm amongst the young. This is especially true amongst young Christadelphians, although they never use the specific term catechumenate, more normally referring to those in this state as "being instructed" or "being taken through".

=== Jehovah's Witnesses ===
Jehovah's Witnesses require a catechumenate of disciples of all ages prior to baptism with a study program led by a baptized minister, using a Watch Tower Society topical textbook that teaches basic Bible doctrines. Students initially progress to become an "unbaptized publisher" of the faith, preaching while continuing further biblical instruction—akin to a catechumen, although the term "Bible student" is used. After demonstrating sufficient comprehension and application of Jehovah's Witnesses' interpretations of the Bible, the student qualifies to be baptized as a Jehovah's Witness.

== The catechumenate and the religious education of the young baptized ==
A catechumen has not been baptized, and is undergoing training in the principles of the faith; one who was baptized as a child has an equal need of education, but this does not start from the same foundation, since baptism has already occurred. The theological basis is common to all sects and taken from the Gospel:

No one can come to me unless the Father who sent me draws them

— John 6:44 NIV

from which the working of God on the catechumen is presupposed. Once baptized, the relationship with God is of a different order.

Since the schisms between the parts of the Church, conversion between the denominations is also possible. Education in the specific doctrines of the sect is therefore seen as necessary, as well as a thorough grounding in the first principles of the faith. This latter may already have occurred when the convert is mature, and the status of catechumen is then usually not implied.

The three cases - baptized as an infant, come to the faith in maturer years, and conversion from one denomination to another - seem outwardly similar. This has led to discussions on their differentiation, notably the International Anglican Liturgical Consultation which, at its meeting in Toronto in 1991, stated that the catechumenate for those about to be baptized as infants was to be absolved by their parents and sponsors, thus defining the catechumenate as necessary for all, whether directly or by proxy. The status of the "converted" was dealt with at the same time, but in a way that cannot be considered typical of general Christian thinking, when it was declared that rebaptism was not to be thought of; as a consequence the previously baptized cannot become catechumens.

The remark in the foregoing section on "stages of growth" is important to understand this confusion, and happily this can also be seen as typical of the thinking outside the Anglican church. While all parts of the Church promote the growth from catechumen to novice to full member of the communion, the Protestant churches align it with the education of the young who are already baptized, whereas the Orthodox and Roman parts of the church keep this separate. Various terms are used to describe this process: "alpha courses", "nursery courses", "starter groups", among others. The main difference between denominations is whether these courses include or exclude those who are baptized, and an overlap with youth ministries and even to an extent with evangelism is observable. For further discussion not directly related to the state of catechumen, see other Wiki articles.

The form of education varied, though the earliest recorded methods were lists of questions and answers (Catechism). Sermons were also used (Cyril of Jerusalem). Most catechisms were divided into parts, aiming to follow the spiritual growth of the catechumen. There were certain differences between catechisms for the young baptized and for the unbaptized catechumen.

== Catechumens and conversion ==
The divergence between Christian practice as regards catechumens (a formalised, gradual approach) and the idea of conversion (a sudden, overwhelming event) as the entry into the Church, is one of appearance rather than substance. It is recorded in the Bible that Paul the Apostle, who started out as a Jewish persecutor of the Church, underwent sudden conversion on the way to Damascus when Jesus Christ appeared to him in a vision. Regarded as the type of sudden conversion, this event was followed by baptism, with, however, a period of study and learning following, lasting a number of years.

== Jewish practice ==
Josephus mentions that the Essenes, during the second temple period, had a three-year catechumenate.

== See also ==
- Catholicity
- Christian theology
- The Didache
- Gravissimum educationis
- Orthodoxy
- Religious conversion
- Religious education
- Religious indoctrination
