= Strangers No Longer =

Strangers No Longer: Together on the Journey of Hope is a pastoral letter written by both the United States Conference of Catholic Bishops and the Mexican Episcopal Conference. It was published on 22 January 2003. The lengthy pastoral letter deals with the issue of migration in the context of the United States and Mexico.

== Contents of the letter ==
=== Background ===
The text sets itself against the background of Pope John Paul II's apostolic exhortation Ecclesia in America, citing "the spirit of ecclesial solidarity" began at the synod that the exhortation followed (§3). The long history of migration, shared by both the United States and Mexico, is also cited as background (§13). Strangers No Longer invokes the human reality of migration, and its authors cite their concern at some of the consequences of migration—the vulnerable situation into which migrants are placed, the separation of families, and the challenges presented to social service providers (§4)

=== Migration in light of scripture ===
The section of Strangers No Longer dealing with migration in light of scripture brings out the material from both the Old and New Testaments that the bishops see as relevant to the phenomenon of migration today. From the Old Testament, the bishops cite the story of Abraham and Sarah's hospitality to three strangers who in the end proved to manifestations of God (§24). They go on, referring to the forced migrations recounted in the story of Joseph, and note how the grace of God was present and worked through the story (§24). Finally, they cite the tradition of the Exodus, and point out how that event led to the formulation of the commandments found in the Torah to love the stranger (§25).

In the New Testament, the bishops recall, echoing Pope Pius XII's Exsul Familia, that the Holy Family were themselves refugees, forced into exile in Egypt because of persecution. The bishops go on to cite the Matthean description of "the mysterious presence of Jesus in the migrants who frequently lack food and drink and are detained in prison" (§26).

=== Migration in light of Catholic social teaching ===
The bishops, reflecting on Catholic social teaching on migration in the past, reformulate the teaching into five main points.

- All people have a right to find opportunity in their homeland (§34)
- All people have a right to migrate in order to support themselves and their families (§35)
- Nations have the right to control their borders (§36)
- Refugees and asylum seekers should be protected by the international community (§37)
- The dignity and human rights of undocumented migrants should be protected (§38)

The bishops go on to insist that the person's right to migrate and the nation's right to control its borders are complementary. The state may impose reasonable limits on migration based on the common good, but the common good ceases to be served when the individual's human rights are violated. Thus, the bishops claim that, in the present climate, the presumption must be in favor of the person's right to migrate (§39).

=== Pastoral challenges for the Church ===
The bishops call the Church toward three things: conversion, communion, and solidarity. In the movement toward conversion, they call on Church members to lead and undergo a conversion of mind and heart, "confronting attitudes of cultural superiority, indifference, and racism" and accepting migrants as persons with dignity and rights (§40). In the movement toward communion, they insist that conversion leads to communion, which involves a serious spirit of hospitality (§41-42). Finally, in the movement toward solidarity, the bishops call on leaders of their local churches at all levels to lead the faithful in promoting justice, denouncing injustice, and put themselves on the line courageously defending the basic human rights of migrants (§43). The bishops go on to call for a comprehensive and collaborative pastoral response of the Church to migrants.

=== Challenging public policy ===
The bishops call on society and public policy makers to do several things. First, the root causes of migration must be addressed. This, according to the bishops, is necessary in order to realize the right to find opportunity in one's homeland (§59). Thus, inequalities between the United States and Mexico must be addressed, and greater employment opportunities must be created in Mexico (§61).

The document goes on to call for the creation of greater legal paths for migration. These legal pathways must include provisions to allow the reunion of families, allow for legalization of the undocumented, and create employment-based opportunities to allow the flow of laborers to maintain healthy economies (§64-77).

Finally, the bishops insist that any enforcement policy must be humane, and employ tactics in accord with the migrant's human dignity (§78-91). This humane enforcement means granting due process rights (§92-94)

== Reception of the pastoral letter ==
In Strangers No Longer, the bishops challenge the Church to be—in the words of Lumen gentium—"sign and instrument both of a very closely knit union with God and of the unity of the whole human race" (§103). They challenge the presidents and other government officials to work for a more just migration policy (§104). Finally, they challenge themselves to defend migrants, stand in solidarity with them, and help to create a just environment for them to thrive (§105-106).

What impact this pastoral letter has had in challenging these three groups is open to debate. One concrete result of the pastoral letter is the creation of the Justice for Immigrants campaign in the United States to lobby for a more just immigration policy.

In 2025, the Michigan-based network Strangers No Longer, named after the pastoral letter, organized a large-scale interfaith march to the U.S. Immigration and Customs Enforcement (ICE) Detroit field office, delivering a letter calling for more humane enforcement practices and dialogue with immigrant communities. ICE declined to meet or accept the letter.

== Folk song based upon the pastoral letter ==
In 2005, American folk singer Alexander Sands composed the song Strangers No Longer, based upon the social teachings and challenges found in the pastoral letter. The song's opening line "They say: hey here we are in beautiful Texas", is reported to come from the opening of Game 3 of the 2005 World Series played in Houston Texas. In a 2006 radio interview, the composer himself discussed the speculation: "I used that line from the baseball game to mock the hypocrisy- the same people who spit on immigrants trying to come to America and earn a decent wage are the same ones who are cheering at their favorite Latino ball players to win their pennants and trophies. Suddenly people are off their seats screaming, 'we love you', and the money involved is just gross."
