= Sacramentum caritatis =

2007 apostolic exhortation by Pope Benedict XVI

Sacramentum caritatis Latin for 'The Sacrament of Charity' Apostolic exhortation of Pope Benedict XVI
- Signature date: 22 February 2007
- Subject: sacrament of the Eucharist
- Number: 1 of 4 of the pontificate
- Text: In Latin; In English

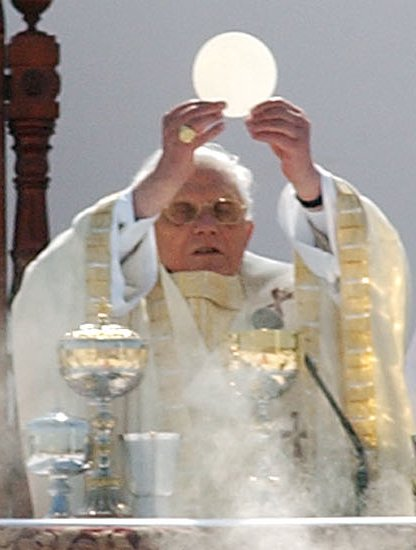
Benedict XVI holding the Blessed Sacrament, also known as the Eucharist, which Catholics believe to be Jesus Christ's real, true, and substantial Body and Blood.

Sacramentum caritatis (The Sacrament of Charity) is the first post-synodal (Rome, 2 October 2005 – 23 October 2005) apostolic exhortation by Pope Benedict XVI. It was signed 22 February 2007.

The document expounded on the sacrament of the Eucharist. Following an introduction, it consisted of three parts, each presenting a different perspective of the Church's understanding of the Eucharist.

== Content ==
Pope Benedict examines the important relationship between the Eucharist and the other sacraments. He also highlights the social implications of the Eucharist and connects it with the Church's social teaching. The document is divided in three parts revolving around the Eucharist as a mystery (1) to be believed, (2) to be celebrated, and (3) to be lived.

To be believed

In Sacramentum caritatis, Benedict quotes John 6:51, ""I am the living bread which came down from heaven; if anyone eats of this bread, he will live forever; and the bread which I shall give for the life of the world is my flesh". He points out that the Eucharist is essentially Trinitarian. "Saint Cyril of Jerusalem, in his Catecheses, states that we "call upon God in his mercy to send his Holy Spirit upon the offerings before us, to transform the bread into the body of Christ and the wine into the blood of Christ." The epiclesis of the Mass is a petition to the Father to send down the gift of the Spirit so that the bread and the wine will become the body and blood of Jesus Christ.

Benedict also expands on the relationship between the Eucharist and the Sacrament of Penance. "We know that the faithful are surrounded by a culture that tends to eliminate the sense of sin and to promote a superficial approach that overlooks the need to be in a state of grace in order to approach sacramental communion worthily. The loss of a consciousness of sin always entails a certain superficiality in the understanding of God's love. Bringing out the elements within the rite of Mass that express consciousness of personal sin and, at the same time, of God's mercy, can prove most helpful to the faithful."

Since the beauty of the Eucharist pertains directly to Christ in his person, it enables the participants a glimpse into the eschatological dimension inherent in the Eucharist as a pledge of future glory.

To be celebrated

In the celebration of the Eucharist, Jesus Christ shows us how the truth of love can transform even the dark mystery of death into the radiant light of the resurrection. Through the Eucharist, He becomes all in all, present in his totality within the members of the Church (par #36). The individual members make up the spiritual stones of the Church. Singing is an expression of joy and, if we consider the matter, an expression of love. The new man sings a new song. (par #42)

To be lived

== See also ==
- Ecclesia de Eucharistia

== Sources ==
- "Sacramentum caritatis".
