= Dominum =

Dominum may refer to:

- Dominum (band), German power metal band
- Dominum directum, the right of the feudal lord to direct in the disposition of an asset, typically land
- Dominum et vivificantem ("The Lord and Giver of Life"), the name of the fifth encyclical written by Pope John Paul II
- Laudate Dominum, the opening words of a Roman Catholic hymn
