= Une espérance nouvelle pour le Liban =

Post-synodal apostolic exhortation of Pope John Paul II

Une espérance nouvelle pour le Liban French for 'A New Hope for Lebanon' Apostolic exhortation of Pope John Paul II
- Signature date: 10 May 1997
- Number: 10 of 15 of the pontificate
- Original language: French
- Text: In original language
- AAS: 89: 313–416

Une espérance nouvelle pour le Liban (English: A New Hope for Lebanon) is a post-synodal apostolic exhortation of Pope John Paul II, signed on 10 May 1997 in Harissa-Daraoun, Lebanon. It came as the result of a synod of Lebanese Catholic bishops in Rome in November–December 1995.
