= Christifideles laici =

Apostolic exhortation

Christifideles laici Latin for 'Christ's Faithful Laity' Apostolic exhortation of Pope John Paul II
- Signature date: 30 December 1988
- Number: 5 of 15 of the pontificate
- Text: In Latin; In English

Christifideles laici (Ecclesiastical Latin: [kristifiˈdeles ˈla.itʃi]) is a post-synodal apostolic exhortation of Pope John Paul II, signed in Rome on December 30, 1988. It is summary of the teaching that arose from the 1987 synod of bishops on the vocation and mission of the laity in the church and the world. The document's subtitle was: On the Vocation and the Mission of the Lay Faithful in the Church and in the World. Its primary scriptural texts were the parable of the workers in the vineyard (Matthew 20) and the story of the True Vine and branches (John 15). In Christifideles laici, John Paul summarized many of his still-developing ideas regarding new evangelization.

The goal of the document is to indicate the role of lay participation in human society. "This Exhortation intends to stir and promote a deeper awareness among all the faithful of the gift and responsibility they share, both as a group and as individuals, in the communion and mission of the Church."

Christifideles laici calls attention to the duty of lay Christians to make their daily conduct a shining and convincing testimony to the gospel (CL 34, 51). For coming generations, lay faithful must offer the valuable contribution of a systematic work in catechesis with parents being the primary catechists of their children. Service to human society finds its fulfilment through the creation and transmission of culture.

== See also ==
- Apostolicam actuositatem
