= Dominicae cenae =

1980 apostolic letter on the Eucharist

Dominicae Cenae (English: The Mystery and Worship of the Eucharist) is an apostolic letter written by Pope John Paul II concerning the Eucharist and its role in the life of the Church and the life of the priest. It also touches on other Eucharistic topics.

It was promulgated on February 24, 1980, the Second Sunday of Lent.

== Content ==
The Church and the world have a great need of eucharistic worship. Jesus waits for us in this sacrament of love. Let us be generous with our time in going to meet Him in adoration and in contemplation that is full of faith and ready to make reparation for the great faults and crimes of the world by our adoration...

Dominicae Cenae is divided into four major sections:

=== The Eucharistic Mystery in the Life of the Church and of the Priest ===
1. Eucharist and Priesthood
2. Worship of the Eucharistic Mystery
3. Eucharist and Church
4. Eucharist and Charity
5. Eucharist and Neighbor
6. Eucharist and Life

The Eucharist is a sign of the dignity of the human person.

=== The Sacred Character of the Eucharist and Sacrifice ===
1. Sacred Character
2. Sacrifice

=== The Two Tables of the Lord and the Common Possession of the Church ===
1. The Table of the Word of God
2. The Table of the Bread of the Lord
3. A Common Possession of the Church

While the use of the vernacular "enables everyone to participate with fuller understanding", Latin expresses the unity of the Church and lends a dignified character to the profound sense of the Eucharistic Mystery, and should be accommodated where practicable. While those who receive Communion in the hand, do so "with reverence and devotion”, caution should be exercised to guard against potential disrespect, profanation, weakening of Eucharistic faith, and indifference. The pope then directed attention to the directives issued by the various departments of the Holy See in liturgical matters, to the rules established by the liturgical books in what concerns the Eucharistic Mystery, and in the Instructions and Norms devoted to this mystery.

== See also ==
- Mysterium fidei (encyclical)
- Ecclesia de Eucharistia
