= C'est la confiance =

2023 exhortation of Pope Francis

C'est la confiance French for 'It is confidence' Apostolic exhortation of Pope Francis
- Signature date: 15 October 2023
- Subject: Saint Thérèse of Lisieux
- Number: 7 of 7 of the pontificate
- Text: In Latin; In English

C'est la confiance ("It is confidence") is the seventh apostolic exhortation of Pope Francis, on the topic of "confidence in the merciful love of God". It was published on 15 October 2023, the feast of Saint Teresa of Ávila, and dedicated to Saint Thérèse of Lisieux, celebrating the 150th anniversary of her birth.

== Content ==
Prologue

1. Jesus for others

- A missionary soul
- The grace that sets us free from self-absorption

2. The little way of trust and love

- Apart from all merit
- Daily abandonment
- Fire burning in the night
- A most firm hope

3. I will be love

- Charity as a personal attitude of love
- The greatest love in supreme simplicity
- In the heart of the Church
- A shower of roses

4. At the heart of the Gospel

- The Doctor of synthesis

== Prayer concluding the text ==
The Pontiff concludes his exhortation with the following prayer:

Dear Saint Therese,

the Church needs to radiate the brightness,
the fragrance and the joy of the Gospel.
Send us your roses!
Help us to be, like yourself,
ever confident in God's immense love for us,
so that we may imitate each day
your "little way" of holiness.

Amen.

== See also ==
- Saint Teresa of Ávila
- Saint Thérèse of Lisieux
