= Vita consecrata =

1996 apostolic exhortation by Pope John Paul II

Vita consecrata Latin for 'The consecrated life' Apostolic exhortation of Pope John Paul II
- Signature date: 25 March 1996
- Subject: On the consecrated life and its mission in the Church and in the world
- Number: 9 of 15 of the pontificate
- Text: In Latin; In English

Vita consecrata is an apostolic exhortation written by Pope John Paul II, published on 25 March 1996. The exhortation is a post-synodal document. Its sub-title is "On the consecrated life and its mission in the Church and in the world".

In the consecrated life, individuals commit themselves to the evangelical counsels of chastity, poverty and obedience. Their lives testify to the values of the Kingdom of God. The profession of chastity, poverty and obedience rejects the idolatry of anything created and points to God as the absolute good.

== See also ==
- Perfectae Caritatis
