= Affusion =

Method of baptism

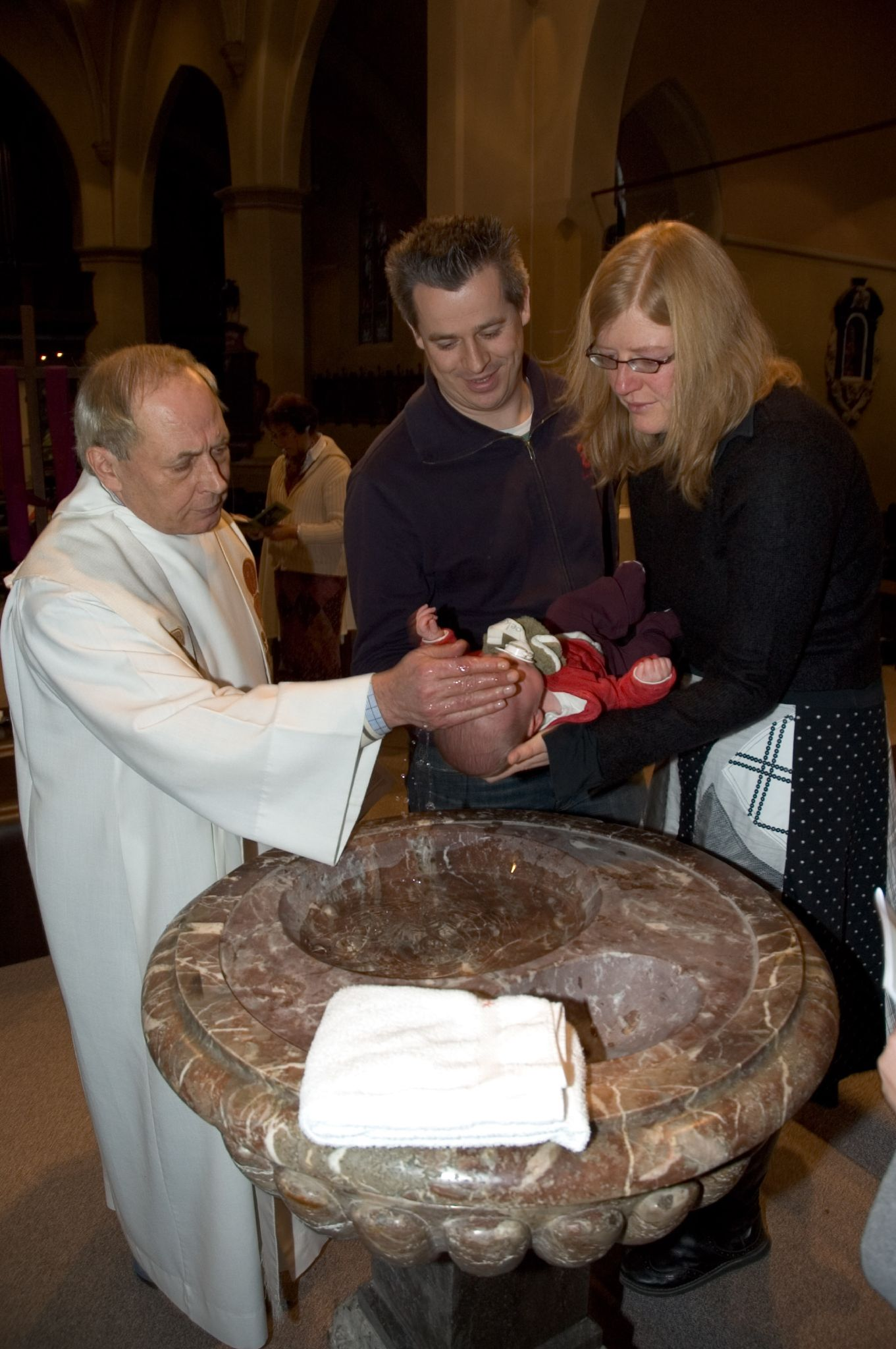
Affusion of the infant

Affusion is a method of baptism where water is poured on the head of the person being baptized. The word "affusion" comes from the Latin affusio, meaning "to pour on". Affusion is one of four methods of baptism used by Christians, which also include total or partial immersion baptism and aspersion or sprinkling.

Christian denominations which baptize by affusion do not deny the legitimacy of baptizing by submersion or immersion; rather, they consider that affusion is a sufficient, if not necessarily preferable, method of baptism. Affusion and aspersion tend to be practiced by Christian denominations that also practice infant baptism. This may be due to the practical difficulties and dangers of drowning and hypothermia associated with totally immersing an infant in cold water. However, most Eastern Christians (e.g. Eastern Orthodox) and some Catholics practice infant immersion. Amish, Old Order Mennonites, and Conservative Mennonites still practice baptism by pouring.

== History ==
Affusion became the standard practice in the western church around the 10th century, but was in use much earlier. The earliest explicit reference to baptism by affusion occurs in the Didache (c. AD 100), the seventh chapter of which gives instructions on how to baptize, which include affusion:

…But if you have no living water, baptize into other water; and if you cannot do so in cold water, do so in warm. But if you have neither, pour out water three times upon the head into the name of Father and Son and Holy Spirit. (Emphasis added)

This text implies that early Christians saw affusion as a viable alternative to immersion when no living water (i.e. running water like a river or spring) or cold water is available.

Acts of various martyrs show that many were baptized in prison, while awaiting martyrdom; immersion would have been impossible. The most common use, however, was for ill or dying people who could not rise from their beds. It was consequently known as "baptism of the sick". Receiving this baptism was regarded as a bar to Holy Orders, but this sprang from the person's having put off baptism until the last moment—a practice that in the fourth century became common, with people enrolling as catechumens but not being baptized for years or decades. While the practice was decried at the time, the intent of the criticism was not to encourage baptism by immersion, but to refrain from delaying baptism.

== Affusion and the Bible ==
In the New Testament book of Acts, speaks to a “pouring out” of the Holy Spirit (Acts 2:17,18,33; Acts 10:45). However, none of these verses refer directly to baptism. It may also indicate that Luke’s concept of baptism includes, or allows for, baptism by pouring. For instance, on Pentecost, the disciples were baptized with the Holy Spirit by having the Spirit “poured out” on them from heaven not by being dipped in the Holy Spirit until they were completely immersed.

Submersionists say that passages like these do not directly speak to the issue of water baptism because they are, strictly speaking, about baptism with the Holy Spirit. Affusionists think they indirectly apply to water baptism, though, by telling something about the general concept of baptism, regardless of whether the medium of baptism is water or Spirit.

Affusionists see more evidence that Luke’s concept of baptism includes pouring by noting an additional possible connection between water baptism and Holy Spirit baptism. In Acts 10, believers with Peter are “astonished that the gift of the Holy Spirit had been poured out even on the Gentiles” (Acts 10:45). Peter responds by saying, “Can anyone keep these people from being baptized with water? They have received the Holy Spirit just as we have" (Acts 10:47).

Affusionists read Peter to be saying "by having the Spirit poured out on them, these people already have been baptized with the Spirit, so why not actually baptize them with water." They understand Peter’s words to imply that water baptism is a symbolic picture of the Holy Spirit baptism. If this is right, affusionists contend, then water baptism should be, or, at least, can be, by pouring, because the baptism with the Holy Spirit of which it is a picture occurs by pouring.

Also noteworthy to affusionists is that, in Luke 11:38, the word ἐβαπτίσθη [ebaptisthē] is used in the Greek and baptizatus is used in the Latin. Both words are used, in other passages, to mean baptism. But in that verse of Luke, the "washing" referred to is partial, like affusion.

== See also ==
- Believer's baptism
- Baptism of desire
- Baptism of Jesus
- Baptism with the Holy Spirit
- Conditional baptism
- John the Baptist
