= Misericordia Dei =

2002 apostolic letter by Pope John Paul II

Misericordia Dei (Mercy of God) is the title of an apostolic letter by Pope John Paul II to foster and reemphasize the importance of the Sacrament of Reconciliation. The letter is subtitled "On Certain Aspects of the Sacrament of Penance" and was promulgated on 7 April 2002 in Rome, issued as Motu proprio and was signed by him.

The letter begins by quoting the Gospel of Matthew 1:21 that Jesus was born to "save his people from their sins" and emphasizes the fervent and energetic summons with which John the Baptist called for repentance. Quoting the Epistle to the Romans 8:21, it states that "Salvation is therefore and above all redemption from sin, which hinders friendship with God."

The letter emphasizes that Jesus himself granted the Apostles, through the power of the Holy Spirit, the authority to reconcile repentant sinners with God and the Church and quotes the Gospel of John 20:22–23: “Receive the Holy Spirit. If you forgive the sins of any, they are forgiven; if you retain the sins of any, they are retained”.

The letter states that the Sacrament of Reconciliation entails not only the action of the minister – only a Bishop or priest, who judges and absolves, tends and heals in the name of Christ – but also the actions of the penitent: contrition, confession and satisfaction. The letter emphasizes the need for penitents to "name their own sins", except when this is not possible.

As in the year 2000 letter Novo Millennio Ineunte John Paul II again asked the clergy for "renewed pastoral courage in ensuring that the day-to-day teaching of Christian communities persuasively and effectively presents the practice of the Sacrament of Reconciliation".

== See also ==
- Reconciliatio et paenitentia
