= Familiaris consortio =

1981 Catholic Church document on marriage and the family

Familiaris consortio Latin for 'The fellowship of the family' Apostolic exhortation of Pope John Paul II
- Signature date: 22 November 1981
- Number: 2 of 15 of the pontificate
- Text: In English

Familiaris consortio (The fellowship of the family; subtitled On the Role of the Christian Family in the Modern World) is a post-synodal apostolic exhortation written by Pope John Paul II and promulgated on 22 November 1981.

== Summary ==
The document describes the position of the Catholic Church on the meaning and role of marriage and the family, and outlines challenges towards realizing that ideal. It refers to marriage as "one of the most precious and most urgent tasks of Christian couples in our time", and as "the foundation of the wider community of the family, since the very institution of marriage and conjugal love are ordained to the procreation and education of children, in whom they find their crowning".

Among other observations, Familiaris consortio restates the Church's opposition to artificial birth control, stated previously in Humanae vitae, and briefly mentions the opposition of the Church to abortion. It also discusses the responsibility and expectations of the family regarding the education of children. It continues with a description of the expectations of the family relative to the larger society, including service to the poor.

The document establishes that "any violence" applied "in favor of contraception or, still worse, of sterilization and procured abortion, must be altogether condemned and forcefully rejected". It foresees the restoration of the Covenant mediated by Jesus Christ God, and the restoration of the society in compliance with the God's plan of salvation for all the human kind.

The final (and more articulated) portion of the document describes expectations of the family which more directly involve the Catholic Faith in daily life, relating it to several of the Catholic sacraments, particularly marriage, and strongly urging family prayer. In particular, this section of the document restates the expectation of a permanent Catholic union for all members of the Church seeking marriage. It rejects the acceptability of alternative arrangements, including "trial marriages", exclusively civil marriages, and unions with no publicly recognized bond.

== Pope Francis' Amoris laetitia ==
In 2016, Pope Francis published the post-synodal apostolic exhortation Amoris laetitia. Various media outlets said there was a potential change in Church teaching on the reception of the Eucharist by those who have divorced and remarried, to which the media said Francis alluded in footnote no. 351, which reads (with footnoted body text in italics):

Because forms of conditioning and mitigating factors, it is possible that in an objective situation of sin – which may not be subjectively culpable, or fully such – a person can be living in God's grace, can love and can also grow in the life of grace and charity, while receiving the Church's help to this end.

351. In certain cases, this can include the help of the sacraments. Hence, "I want to remind priests that the confessional must not be a torture chamber, but rather an encounter with the Lord's mercy" (Apostolic Exhortation Evangelii Gaudium [24 November 2013], 44: AAS 105 [2013], 1038). I would also point out that the Eucharist "is not a prize for the perfect, but a powerful medicine and nourishment for the weak" (ibid., 47: 1039).

Reports addressed the apparent contradictions between this footnote and Familiaris consortio and John Paul II's apostolic exhortation Reconciliatio et paenitentiae. Some traditionalists, notably Kazhakstani Bishop Athanasius Schneider and the group Voice of the Family, have criticized Francis' exhortation. Voice of the Family has called on him to "recognise the grave errors in the recently published Apostolic Exhortation, Amoris Laetitia, in particular those sections which will lead to the desecration of the Holy Eucharist and to the harming of our children, and to withdraw the Apostolic Exhortation with immediate effect."

== See also ==
- Catholic theology of the body
- Natural family planning (NFP)
- Theology of the body
- Casti connubii
