= Ecclesia in Europa =

Apostolic exhortation

Ecclesia in Europa Latin for 'The Church in Europe' Apostolic exhortation of Pope John Paul II
- Signature date: 28 June 2003
- Number: 14 of 15 of the pontificate
- Text: In English

Ecclesia in Europa (English: The Church in Europe) is a post-synodal apostolic exhortation written by Pope John Paul II, published on 28 June 2003. The exhortation follows up on the Special Assembly for Europe of the Synod of Bishops, which met during 1–23 October 1999. It addresses the Church in Europe.

The document was organized using a theme of hope. Its foundational Bible texts were taken from the Book of Revelation.

Ecclesia in Europa candidly recognized that Europe was on the verge of becoming a post-Christian continent, in that the Gospel must now bring its “message of hope to a Europe that seems to have lost sight of it.”

== Continental Synods in Preparation for the Great Jubilee of 2000 ==
As part of the preparation for the Great Jubilee of the Year 2000, Pope John Paul II convened five special synods of bishops to consider the situation of the church in each of the five continents: Africa, America, Asia, Oceania, and Europe. The synods developed responses to the challenges of holiness, evangelization, and service confronting the church in each region at this milestone in history. The synods prepared the Church for the year 2000 and Third Millennium by promoting a “New evangelization"

== Appeal related to the pending Constitution for the European Union ==
Pope John Paul II pushed for a reference to Europe's Christian cultural roots in the draft of the European Constitution. In Ecclesia in Europa, John Paul II wrote that he "fully (respected) the secular nature of (European) institutions". However, he wanted the EU Constitution to enshrine religious rights, including acknowledging the rights of religious groups to organise freely and to enjoy the legal status enjoyed by religious institutions in individual member states. "I wish once more to appeal to those drawing up the future European Constitutional Treaty so that it will include a reference to the religion and in particular to the Christian heritage of Europe," John Paul II said.

== See also ==
- Pope John Paul II § European Union
