= Menti nostrae =

Menti nostrae Apostolic exhortation of Pope Pius XII
- Signature date: September 23, 1950
- Subject: The sanctity of priestly life
- Text: In Latin

Menti nostrae is an apostolic exhortation of Pope Pius XII on the sanctity of priestly life, given in Rome at St. Peter's on September 23, 1950, in the 12th year of his pontificate.

== Contents ==
Menti nostrae has four parts, addressing the sanctity of priestly life, priestly service, practical regulations and special difficulties of priestly life. Priestly life means first of all the imitation of the life of Christ, according to the Pontiff. This is especially important in a modern world, in which so many are confused by conflicting — even anti-Christian — messages. Imitation of Christ means an inner relation with Christ, full observance of celibacy and a separation from earthly goods. The priest participates in Holy Mass on the sacrifice of Christ and in his mystical death and resurrection. Great emphasis is put on the prayer life of the priests. The Liturgy of the hours is of prime importance as is daily contemplation, private prayers, his frequent confession and spiritual guidance through an experienced priest of his confidence.

The sanctity of priestly service is reflected in his role as giver of divine graces. He should be motivated by apostolic fervor and be a pastor reflecting the love and goodness of Christ. Constantly, he should improve his knowledge not only of divine but also temporal things. Pope Pius, with warm words, praises priests in service for the spiritual life of their fellow priests.

Special efforts have to be undertaken to recruit young persons to the priesthood. Every priest has to participate in this task first of all by setting an example but also by encouraging young men. Candidates have to be very carefully screened to ensure that they are capable of bearing the pressures of the office. The seminaries, while fostering spiritual formation, should not encourage a separation from the world, since priests live and work in this world. Seminarians have to be trained in obedience and chastity. Candidates with celibacy problems should not be permitted to stay. There have to be a special efforts for newly ordained priests to help them in their first years. Priests need to undergo continuous education, for which libraries should be established in every diocese with reading rooms and a good balance of theological, spiritual and practical resources for priests.

In these changing times, priests need to learn to discern and differentiate. Hanging on to all old traditions is equally dangerous as blind acceptance of everything new. Regarding communism and capitalism, the Church has pointed the shortcomings of both, branding the misuse of private property and exploitation as well as the activities of communists, trying to destroy faith and promising material well-being. The priest has to be open for the poor and the workers and all those who are in need and misery, not few of them from the middle class. The social teaching of the Church combines the demands of justice and charity, and thus promotes a social order which does not oppress the individual or foster blind egoism:

"The damaging effects of both economic systems must inspire everybody to follow the social teachings of the Church, to disseminate knowledge of it and to apply it."

However, with all his social engagement, the priest is not to forget he overall mission and context. Lay persons are mainly called to the practical apostolate and priests are only to assist if necessary. In his last point, Pope Pius addresses the economic needs of the clergy in some regions and countries. After the war, there was much suffering, but bishops and clergy generously shared with those badly affected by the consequences of war. Such problems cannot be solved in the long run if the faithful are not included in a solution. They have to be convinced, that priests need a material basis to exist and to work for them.

== Later developments ==
The Fathers of the Second Vatican Council referred to Menti nostrae in observing that priests who work in connection with specific forms of the lay apostolate need to be carefully selected and "properly trained".
