= Africae munus =

2011 apostolic exhortation by Pope Benedict XVI

Africae munus Latin for 'Africa's commitment' Apostolic exhortation of Pope Benedict XVI
- Signature date: 19 November 2011
- Number: 3 of 4 of the pontificate
- Text: In English

Africae munus (Africa's commitment) is the third post-synodal apostolic exhortation issued by Pope Benedict XVI. It was signed on 19 November 2011 in Benin.
