= Dominum et vivificantem =

1986 papal encyclical by Pope John Paul II

Dominum et vivificantem Latin for 'The Lord and Giver of Life' Encyclical of Pope John Paul II
- Signature date: 18 May 1986
- Subject: On the Holy Spirit in the life of the Catholic Church and the world.
- Number: 5 of 14 of the pontificate
- Text: In Latin; In English

Dominum et vivificantem (Latin: The Lord and Giver of Life) is the fifth encyclical written by Pope John Paul II. The encyclical was promulgated on 18 May 1986. It is a theological examination of the role of the Holy Spirit as it pertains to the modern world and the church and the use of spiritual prayer to renew one's spiritual life. This extended meditation on the Holy Spirit completed the Pope's Trinitarian trilogy of encyclicals, which includes Redemptor Hominis and Dives in Misericordia.

In 1986, Pope John Paul II was already anticipating the new millennium, with its new challenges, as well as the new graces the Holy Spirit would bestow upon the Church as she celebrated the Great Jubilee beginning the third millennium of Christianity. Wishing to prepare the Church for these things by giving the people of God an increased awareness and knowledge of the Holy Spirit, he issued the encyclical on May 18, the Solemnity of Pentecost.
