= Redemptor hominis =

1979 papal encyclical by Pope John Paul II

Redemptor hominis Latin for 'The Redeemer of Man' Encyclical of Pope John Paul II
- Signature date: 4 March 1979
- Subject: At the beginning of the pontificate
- Number: 1 of 14 of the pontificate
- Text: In Latin; In English

Redemptor hominis (Latin: The Redeemer of Man) is the name of the first encyclical written by Pope John Paul II. It lays a blueprint for his pontificate in its exploration of contemporary human problems and especially their proposed solutions found in a deeper understanding of the human person. The encyclical was promulgated on 4 March 1979, less than five months after his installation as pope.

== Summary of the encyclical ==
This first encyclical of Pope John Paul II examines major problems confronting the world at the time. John Paul II began his papacy during a crisis of self-doubt and internal criticism in the Catholic Church. He alludes to this in the encyclical's introduction, stating his confidence that the new movement of life in the Church "is much stronger than the symptoms of doubt, collapse, and crisis." He says that Jesus is real and living.

Redemptor hominis proposes that the solution to these problems may be found through a fuller understanding of the person: both of the human person, and that of Christ. As such, his first encyclical repeatedly stresses the pope's favored philosophical approach of personalism, an approach that he used repeatedly throughout the rest of his papacy.

The encyclical also works to prepare the Church for the upcoming third millennium, calling the remaining years of the 20th century "a season of a new Advent, a season of expectation" in preparation for the new millennium.

=== The humanity of the mystery of the redemption ===
John Paul II points to the central doctrines of the Incarnation and the Redemption as, above all, evidence of God's love for humanity: "Man cannot live without love.... This ... is why Christ the Redeemer fully reveals man to himself." In response, anyone, no matter how weak, wishing to understand himself thoroughly, must "assimilate the whole of the reality of the Incarnation and Redemption in order to find himself."

=== Critique of atheist governments ===
Without naming it explicitly, Redemptor hominis confronts the system of atheistic Communism, as in his native Poland, an "atheism that is programmed, organized, and structured as a political system." John Paul confronts this on the philosophical level as inherently inhuman. Citing Augustine's famous quote of "You made us for yourself, Lord, and our heart is restless until it rests in you," John Paul argues that the human person naturally strives for God (as understood through the various religions) as the full dimension of humanity. Thus, systems that deny this essential aspect of human nature are fundamentally flawed and inherently unable to satisfy the deepest human longings for the full expression of life. This lays a philosophical foundation for the pope's remarkably successful career in confronting Communism in the political field.

He specifically denounces government persecution of any religion: "the curtailment of the religious freedom of individuals and communities is not only a painful experience but it is above all an attack on man's very dignity."

=== Missionary message and religious freedom ===
Foreshadowing his many successful travels around the world, John Paul stresses the need of bringing the message of God to "all cultures, all ideological concepts, all people of good will" with a proper "missionary attitude." This attitude, he insists, must first begin with a proper regard of "what is in man," again stressing the personalist theme. He stresses that a proper expression of the missionary attitude is not destructive, but rather begins with building on what is already there.

John Paul uses this as a foundation to another of the central themes of his papacy: that of religious freedom. Building on the declaration of the Second Vatican Council in Dignitatis humanae (Declaration on Religious Freedom), Pope John Paul teaches that any missionizing work by the Church must begin with a "deep esteem for man, for his intellect, his will, his conscience and his freedom." He goes on to the Catholic Church as the true repository of human freedom, while stressing the Church's respect for other religions; this is yet another implicit rebuke to Communist governments that suppress freedom of worship.

=== Christ's union with each person ===
In another aspect of the personalist theme, John Paul writes that it is insufficient to talk of Christ's union with man as an impersonal union of Christ with mankind as an undifferentiated conglomerate: "We are not dealing with the 'abstract man,' but the real, 'concrete,' 'historical' man. We are dealing with 'each' man...."

Rather, he insists that Christ reaches out to each person as an individual. Thus each person on his own may walk his own path of life and reach his fullest potential from that personal experience of Christ's love for him as an individual. In the same way, the Church's mission must also be to reach out personally to each and every person: "Since this man is the way for the Church, the way for her daily life and experience, for her mission and toil, the Church of today must be aware in an always new manner of man's 'situation.'"

=== Man's fears ===
John Paul writes that some of man's greatest fears are the result of his own creations: the ecological damage wrought by untrammeled exploitation of the earth, and the fear brought on by ever-increasing military power with its accompanying threat of widespread destruction, "an unimaginable self-destruction, compared with which all the cataclysms and catastrophes of history known to us seem to fade away."

John Paul points out that although man's technological and material accomplishments certainly stand as authentic signs of man's greatness, they provoke a disquieting question: "Does this progress, which has man for its author and promoter, make human life on earth 'more human' in every aspect of that life? Does it make it more 'worthy of man?'" Yet again, the true measure of good is the effect on the human person, not just mere accomplishment and accumulation. The encyclical teaches that even if contrary to its intention, any purely materialistic system that essentially ignores the human person must in the end condemn man to being a slave of his own production.

Denouncing the imbalance of economic resources, another oft-repeated theme of his papacy, John Paul encourages an increased concern for the problems of the poor. Once more, he stresses that the key to this is an increased moral responsibility built on a deeper understanding of the dignity of the human person, as taught by Christ himself in his description of the Last Judgment in the Gospel of Matthew.

=== The Church's teaching mission ===
Anticipating a theme that he would develop at much greater length in his 1993 encyclical Veritatis Splendor, John Paul emphasizes the responsibility of the Church in its prophetic mission to teach the truth to the world. He also indicates the importance of catechesis—teaching the doctrines of the faith—which found fruit in his papacy, most notably in his promulgation of the Catechism of the Catholic Church.

=== The sacraments of Eucharist and Penance ===
The encyclical reaches its final sections with a section on the Eucharist, yet another theme that would mark John Paul's papacy. Emphasizing that "the Eucharist is the centre and summit of the whole of sacramental life," John Paul stresses the familiar Catholic theme of personal union with Christ brought so intimately through the reality of Christ's own person being offered to every person through the Eucharist.

John Paul also brings in the personalist theme in his manner of responding to a controversy of the post-Vatican II Church: the issue of communal penance. In some cases, the sacrament of Penance at the time was being offered to groups of people together, without individual confession. John Paul insists against this that confession as an individual is "man's right to a more personal encounter with the crucified forgiving Christ."

=== Mary ===
Beginning a pattern that marked all of his subsequent encyclicals, John Paul focuses on Mary in the final section. In particular, he invites the Church (by which he means all members of the church, not only the hierarchy) to take Mary as mother, as its model for nourishing the world.

== Redemptor Hominis Church at Saint John Paul II National Shrine ==
- Redemptor Hominis Church is a church facility located at the Saint John Paul II National Shrine in Washington DC.

== See also ==
- Personalism
- List of Encyclicals of Pope John Paul II
- Alliance of the Hearts of Jesus and Mary
