= Aspersion =

Act of sprinkling with water in a religious context

Aspersion (la. aspergere/aspersio), in a religious context, is the act of sprinkling with water, especially holy water. Aspersion is a method used in baptism as an alternative to immersion or affusion. The word is formed of the Latin aspergere, 'to sprinkle', of ad, 'to', and spargo, 'I scatter' (Ezekiel 36:25–26, 1 Corinthians 10:2, cf. Psalm 77:16-20).

In addition, aspersion is performed as part of certain rites to remind people of their baptism, such as the renewal of baptismal vows performed by the Catholic Church and Lutheran Church at Easter.

== Apostolic times ==
Baptism by affusion (pouring) was allowed in exceptional circumstances in the early church, being allowed by the Didache:

And concerning baptism, baptize this way: Having first said all these things, baptize into the name of the Father, and of the Son, and of the Holy Spirit, in living water. But if you have no living water, baptize into other water; and if you cannot do so in cold water, do so in warm. But if you have neither, pour out water three times upon the head into the name of Father and Son and Holy Spirit.

There are no accounts that clearly show sprinkling rather than pouring or immersion was used.

== Early Christianity ==
The normal form of baptism for the first centuries—until at least the twelfth century—was immersion. However, when a person could not be immersed, baptism by aspersion or affusion was performed. There are records of people receiving baptism in prison, awaiting martyrdom, where immersion would be difficult or impossible, but the most common use was for a person who was ill and could not be removed from the bed; it therefore received the name "baptism of the sick." Because of its rarity, doubts arose about its validity, as is shown by St. Cyprian's affirming it in the face of questioning.

You have asked also, dearest son, what I thought of those who obtain God's grace in sickness and weakness, whether they are to be accounted legitimate Christians, for that they are not to be washed, but sprinkled, with the saving water. In this point, my diffidence and modesty prejudges none, so as to prevent any from feeling what he thinks right, and from doing what he feels to be right. As far as my poor understanding conceives it, I think that the divine benefits can in no respect be mutilated and weakened; nor can anything less occur in that case, where, with full and entire faith both of the giver and receiver, is accepted what is drawn from the divine gifts...nor ought it to trouble any one that sick people seem to be sprinkled or affused, when they obtain the Lord's grace, when Holy Scripture speaks by the mouth of the prophet Ezekiel, and says, "Then will I sprinkle clean water upon you, and ye shall be clean: from all your filthiness and from all your idols will I cleanse you. And I will give you a new heart, and a new spirit will I put within you." (Ez 36,25) Also in Numbers: "And the man that shall be unclean until the evening shall be purified on the third day, and on the seventh day shall be clean: but if he shall not be purified on the third day, on the seventh day he shall not be clean. And that soul shall be cut off from Israel: because the water of sprinkling hath not been sprinkled upon him." (Nm 19,12-13) And again: "And the Lord spake unto Moses saying, Take the Levites from among the children of Israel, and cleanse them. And thus shalt thou do unto them, to cleanse them: thou shall sprinkle them with the water of purification." (Nm 8,6-7) And again: "The water of sprinkling is a purification." Whence it appears that the sprinkling also of water prevails equally with the washing of salvation; and that when this is done in the Church, where the faith both of receiver and giver is sound, all things hold and may be consummated and perfected by the majesty of the Lord and by the truth of faith.

At the time, baptism by aspersion, as by affusion, was regarded as a bar to Holy Orders; this appears to spring from the baptized person having put off baptism until he was in danger of death.

== Later developments ==
In the West, baptism by aspersion and affusion slowly became the common practice in later centuries.

In aspersion, an aspergillum may be used to place the water on the skin.

The Catholic Church regards baptism by aspersion as valid only if the water actually flows on the person's skin and is thus equivalent to pouring ("affusion"). If there is doubt about this, conditional baptism is administered.

While the root of the word "baptize" can mean "to immerse", the word is used in the New Testament also of a mere partial washing (Luke 11:38). Nevertheless, some Christian denominations have taught that baptism not only by aspersion but even by affusion is invalid.
