= Reconciliatio et paenitentia =

Apostolic exhortation

Reconciliatio et paenitentia Latin for 'Reconciliation and Penance' Apostolic exhortation of Pope John Paul II
- Signature date: 2 December 1984
- Number: 4 of 15 of the pontificate
- Text: In Latin; In English

Reconciliatio et paenitentia (English: Reconciliation and Penance) is an apostolic exhortation by Pope John Paul II, delivered on 2 December 1984 in Saint Peter's Basilica in Rome, which grew out of the Sixth General Assembly of the Synod of Bishops held in 1983. The fourth of John Paul II's apostolic exhortations, it presents Jesus as the Reconciler of a shattered world.

== Structure ==
John Paul II began the exhortation by recalling from the Gospel of Mark 1:15, the very words with which Jesus began his preaching: "Repent, and believe in the Gospel". Building on that theme, the pope addressed "reconciliation and penance in the mission of the Church today". Continuing his teaching on the mystery of Redemption, the pope presented Jesus as the Reconciler of a shattered world and urged the Church and the world to rediscover the path of penance, the only path that can lead to full reconciliation.

The exhortation has three parts, as well as an introduction and conclusions. The introduction discusses the modern world's divisions and difficulties. It stresses the inherent desire of humanity for reconciliation. The first chapter discusses the fact that the mission of the Church remains the conversion of hearts.

The second part is titled: "The Love That is Greater than Sin" and singles out sin as the cause of the wounds that individuals inflict on themselves, on God and their neighbors. It discusses the personal and social dimensions of sin. The third chapter discusses the means by which the Church fosters penance, reconciliation and healing, returning to the theme of Mark 1:15: "Repent, and believe in the Gospel".

The final part includes a call for unity and conversion of hearts. The teachings on structural sin in this exhortation were also later discussed in the pope's 1987 encyclical Sollicitudo rei socialis.

== Content ==
The pope used the parable of the prodigal son to explain the process of conversion and reconciliation, and that God the Father is "rich in mercy" and always ready to forgive. "Reconciliation is principally a gift of the heavenly Father," and an initiative on his part. He observes that the older brother also needs to be converted from his selfishness and jealousy. Each person is both the prodigal son and the older brother, both in need of reconciliation.

John Paul describes sin as "...the disobedience of a person who, by a free act, does not acknowledge God's sovereignty over his or her life, at least at that particular moment in which he or she transgresses God's law," and it is sin which is ultimately the cause of all divisions and conflicts within human society. The exhortation also discussed John Paul II's view of "structural sin". The pope insists on sin as a free personal act. He views "social sin" in three ways: first that personal sin has social effects, second, that some sins directly affect the neighbor, and third that social sin refers to relationships between human communities. The pope rejected the separation and contrasting of personal and social sin in a way that leads to the dilution and eventual abolition of personal sin, and the substitution of social guilt and responsibility in its place.

He concurs with Pope Pius XII's statement that "the sin of the century is the loss of the sense of sin," and reaffirms the Church's teaching on the distinction between mortal and venial sins. He deplores a view that all failings are blamed upon society, and the individual is declared innocent of them, or which so emphasizes environmental and historical conditioning and their influences that it reduces man's responsibility to the point of not acknowledging his ability to perform truly human acts and therefore his ability to sin.

== See also ==
- Dives in misericordia
- Misericordia Dei
- Sollicitudo rei socialis
