= Sollicitudo rei socialis =

1987 encyclical by Pope John Paul II, on the Church's role in human development

Sollicitudo rei socialis Latin for 'The Social Concern' Encyclical of Pope John Paul II
- Signature date: 30 December 1987
- Subject: On the twentieth anniversary of the encyclical Populorum progressio
- Number: 7 of 14 of the pontificate
- Text: In Latin; In English

Sollicitudo rei socialis (Latin: The Social Concern) is an encyclical letter promulgated by Pope John Paul II on 30 December 1987, on the twentieth anniversary of Populorum progressio. It deals once more with the theme of development along two fundamental lines:

1. the failed development of the third world and
2. the meaning of, conditions and requirements for a development of a worthy person.

The encyclical presents differences between progress and development, and insists that true development cannot be limited to the multiplication of goods and services, but must contribute to the fullness of being a human being. In this way the moral nature of real development is meant to be shown clearly.

The teaching and spreading of her social doctrine are part of the Church's evangelizing mission. And since it is a doctrine aimed at guiding people's behavior, it consequently gives rise to a "commitment to justice", according to each individual's role, vocation and circumstances. (Para.41) The condemnation of evils and injustices is also part of that ministry of evangelization in the social field which is an aspect of the Church's prophetic role. But it should be made clear that proclamation is always more important than condemnation... (Para. 41)

The pope continues in this letter his development of the term "structures of sin", used in his earlier apostolic exhortation, Reconciliatio et paenitentia (1984). "Structures of sin" are defined in the Catechism of the Catholic Church as "social situations or institutions that are contrary to the divine law".
