= Dives in misericordia =

1980 papal encyclical by Pope John Paul II

Dives in misericordia Latin for 'Rich in Mercy' Encyclical of Pope John Paul II
- Signature date: 30 November 1980
- Subject: On Divine Mercy
- Number: 2 of 14 of the pontificate
- Text: In Latin; In English

Dives in misericordia (Latin: Rich in Mercy) is the name of the second encyclical written by Pope John Paul II. It is a modern examination of the role of mercy—both God's mercy, and also the need for human mercy—introducing the biblical parable of the Prodigal Son as a central theme. The original text was written in longhand in Polish. The encyclical was promulgated on 30 November 1980.

== Background ==
John Paul II had a strong love for the Divine Mercy devotion, inspired by his fellow Pole, Faustina Kowalska (b. 1905 - d.1938), a devotion that he later instituted for the entire Catholic Church in 2000 as Divine Mercy Sunday and during which vigil, in 2005, he died. He told his biographer George Weigel that he felt spiritually "very near" to Kowalska when he began the encyclical.

Pope John Paul II's second encyclical continues to examine the world problems brought up in his first encyclical, Redemptor hominis, including rising militarization, tyranny, starvation, and daily problems of personal life. He teaches that the only authentic Christian response to these rising problems is through love informed by God's mercy, especially as revealed in the love of the Father in the Trinity.

== Introduction of the encyclical ==
Just as in his previous encyclical, John Paul motivates his discussion by examining many problems in the world. He posits that many in today's world are made uneasy by the idea of mercy. In opposition to an impersonal, technology-driven dominion over the world that "seems to have no room for mercy," John Paul appeals to the world to turn to the mercy of God: "I wish them to be a heartfelt appeal by the Church to mercy, which humanity and the modern world need so much. And they need mercy even though they often do not realize it."

== Revelation as ongoing ==
The title is taken from Paul the Apostle, who writes in Ephesians 2:4 that God is “rich in mercy”. The theme is "the revelation of the mystery of the Father and his love". "It is, from beginning to end, a reminder to the Church of who the Father is, - who he reveals himself to be." This reiterates a concept discussed in the 1979 apostolic exhortation Catechesi tradendae, which speaks of revelation as both a past and present reality.

== Jesus' message of mercy ==
The pope places a special emphasis on Jesus' teaching mission to the poor, the sick, the sinners and the outcast: "Especially through His lifestyle and through His actions, Jesus revealed that love is present in the world in which we live.... This love makes itself particularly noticed in contact with suffering." Tying this with Jesus' claim that "He who has seen me has seen the Father," John Paul points out that this reveals a similar merciful love for all in the world, especially those who suffer.

== Background in the Old Testament ==
The pope traces the message of divine mercy back to earlier books in the Bible. He discusses the repeated instances of God returning to his people after their abandoning him.

John Paul also comments on the relationship between mercy and justice: "in many cases [mercy] is shown to be not only more powerful than that justice but also more profound." He writes that Scripture shows that "Mercy differs from justice, but is not in opposition to it, if we admit in the history of man [...] the presence of God, who already as Creator has linked Himself to His creature with a particular love."

== The prodigal ==
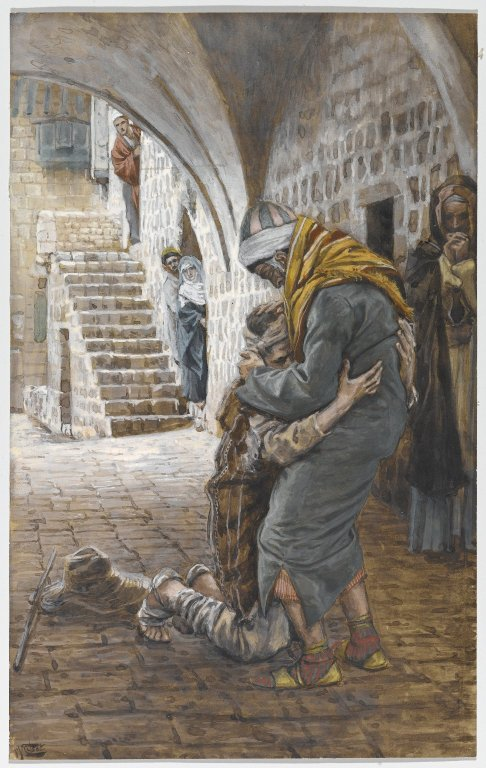
The Return of the Prodigal Son (Le retour de l'enfant prodigue), by James Tissot, Brooklyn Museum

John Paul puts forth the Parable of the Prodigal Son as an especially vivid analogy of God's mercy for man.

When the son decides to return to his father's house, to ask his father to be received—no longer by virtue of his right as a son, but as an employee—at first sight he seems to be acting by reason of the hunger and poverty that he had fallen into; this motive, however, is permeated by an awareness of a deeper loss: to be a hired servant in his own father's house is certainly a great humiliation and source of shame. Nevertheless, the prodigal son is ready to undergo that humiliation and shame. He realizes that he no longer has any right except to be an employee in his father's house. His decision is taken in full consciousness of what he has deserved and of what he can still have a right to in accordance with the norms of justice.

John Paul enlarges on the reaction of the son's father, who welcomes him with unbounded merciful love, rather than a mere insistence on justice. "It becomes more evident that love is transformed into mercy when it is necessary to go beyond the precise norm of justice—precise and often too narrow." John Paul points out that the father's reaction is based on more than mere sentiment, but on a deeper understanding of what his son really needs: "Notice, the father is aware that a fundamental good has been saved: the good of his son's humanity. Although the son has squandered the inheritance, nevertheless his humanity is saved." The pope makes the point that this parable illustrates that mercy is best judged not from the mere externals, but from a deeper examination of what it does to the interior of man.

== Mercy as revealed in the Crucifixion and Resurrection ==
John Paul then turns to the central message of Christianity: Jesus' crucifixion and resurrection, and examines them for their implications on God's mercy. In his Passion, Christ appeals for mercy, but he himself is not spared. Pope John Paul calls this a "superabundance" of God's justice as reparation for the sins of man, yet springing from the supreme love of the Father for man. Thus, he writes, in Jesus' crucifixion, justice is simultaneously fulfilled and revealed by a deeper love: "The divine dimension of redemption is put into effect not only by bringing justice to bear upon sin, but also by restoring to love that creative power in man thanks also which he once more has access to the fullness of life and holiness that come from God. In this way, redemption involves the revelation of mercy in its fullness."
