= Slavorum Apostoli =

1985 papal encyclical by Pope John Paul II

Slavorum Apostoli Latin for 'The Apostles of the Slavs' Encyclical of Pope John Paul II
- Signature date: 2 June 1985
- Subject: In memory of the evangelizing work of Saints Cyril and Methodius after eleven centuries
- Number: 4 of 14 of the pontificate
- Text: In Latin; In English

Slavorum Apostoli (English: The Apostles of the Slavs) is an encyclical written by Pope John Paul II in 1985. In it he talks about two saintly brothers, Saints Cyril and Methodius, and how they preached the gospel to the Slavs.

== Table of contents ==
I. Introduction
II. Biographical Sketch
III. Heralds of the Gospel
IV. They Planted the Church of God
V. Catholic Sense of the Church
VI. The Gospel and Culture
VII. The Significance and Influence of the Christian Millennium in the Slav World
VIII. Conclusion
