= Pastores gregis =

2003 pastoral exhortation by John Paul II

Pastores gregis Latin for 'The Shepherds of the Flock' Apostolic exhortation of Pope John Paul II
- Signature date: 16 October 2003
- Number: 15 of 15 of the pontificate
- Text: In Latin; In English

Pastores gregis (English: The Shepherds of the Flock), subtitled "The Bishop, Servant of the Gospel of Jesus Christ for the Hope of the World," is a post-synod apostolic exhortation released on October 16, 2003 by Pope John Paul II. It offers doctrinal and pastoral principles intended to guide Catholic bishops. The document resulted from an ordinary general assembly of bishops, held from September 30 to October 27, 2001. The synod, which was held shortly after the September 11 attacks, discussed episcopal service in view of Christian hope.

The publication date of Pastores gregis marked John Paul II's 25th anniversary as Bishop of Rome. It was his final apostolic exhortation.
