= A Playne and Godly Exposition or Declaration of the Commune Crede =

1533 religious book by Desiderius Erasmus

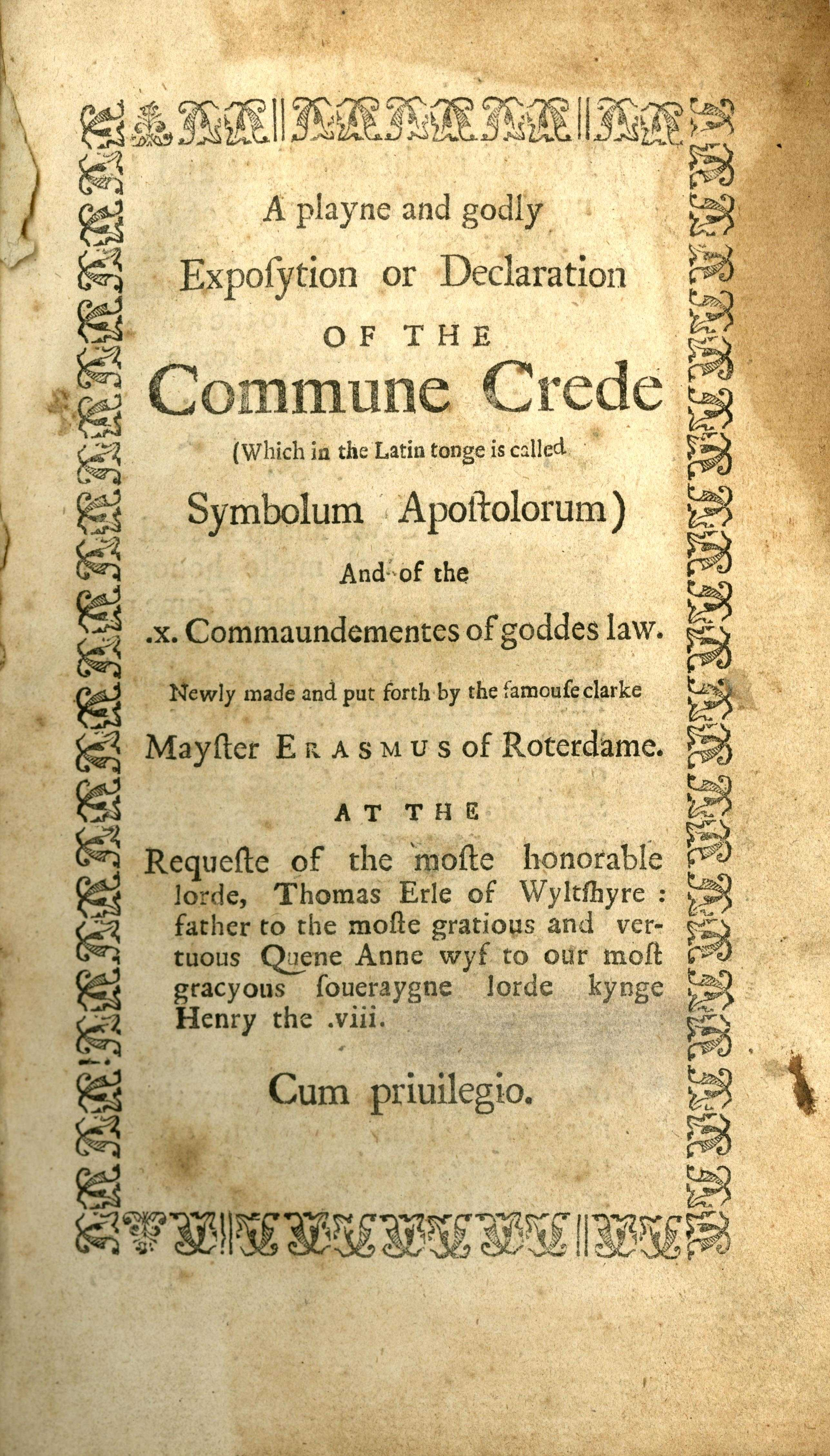
Title page to second printing.

A Playne and Godly Exposytion or Declaration of the Commune Crede is a 1533 work of religious commentary by Desiderius Erasmus, written at the request of Thomas Boleyn, 1st Earl of Wiltshire. The work examines the Apostles' Creed from a Roman Catholic perspective and was written in part as a response to the theological dispute between Erasmus and Martin Luther regarding their differing views on the nature of the Catholic Creed.

The Exposytion of the Commune Creed was published as an English translation of Erasmus’s original Latin text. It carried the subtitle "A Dialog called the Symbole or instructyon in the christen fayth or belyue, made by Mayster Erasmus of Roterdame. The persones speakynge, are the Mayster, and the Disciple, the one is marked by M the other by D." In effect, it is a question-and-answer dialogue between a disciple, who wishes "to be ascrybed and receiued into the company and feloshype of the catholyke churche" and a master, who provides guidance on the essential components of the Catholic faith. It represents the catechism of Erasmus, outlining his interpretation of the Catholic creed during a time of significant theological conflict. This work was written three years before his death in 1536, reflecting Erasmus’s position within the Catholic Church during the early stages of the Reformation.

== Editions ==
It was first printed in 1533, "at the Requeste of the moste honorable lorde, Thomas Erle of Wyltshyre: father to the moste gracyous and vertuous Quene Anne to our most gracyous lorde kynge Henry the .viii."

A reprint of this work was later produced, using Roman type instead of Gothic. This reprint also included a discrepancy in page numbering, with page 178 labeled as 187. The exact date of this reprint remains unknown.
