= Ecclesia in Asia =

1999 apostolic exhortation by Pope John Paul II

Ecclesia in Asia Latin for 'The Church in Asia' Apostolic exhortation of Pope John Paul II
- Signature date: 6 November 1999
- Number: 12 of 15 of the pontificate
- Text: In English

Ecclesia in Asia is an apostolic exhortation issued by Pope John Paul II to serve as a blueprint for the expansion of the Roman Catholic faith in Asia. It summarises ideas and conclusions of the Special Asian Synod held in Rome from April 18 to May 14, 1998. It was officially promulgated by John Paul II in New Delhi, India on November 6, 1999.

The document stated that "just as in the first millennium the Cross was planted on the soil of Europe, and in the second on that of the Americas and Africa, we can pray that in the Third Christian Millennium a great harvest of faith will be reaped in this vast and vital continent of Asia" (EA 1) (JP II 1999:359).

The Exhortation is composed of seven parts dealing with the following themes: the Asian context, Jesus as Savior, the Holy Spirit as Lord and Giver of life, proclamation of Jesus in Asia (with a focus on inculturation), communion and dialogue for mission (with a focus on ecumenical and interreligious dialogue), the service of human promotion, and Christians as witnesses to the Gospel.

The long document concludes as "The peoples of Asia need Jesus Christ and his Gospel. Asia is thirsting for the Living water that Jesus alone can give (cf. Jn 4:10–15). The disciples of Christ in Asia must therefore be unstinting in their efforts to fulfil the mission they have received from the Lord, who has promised to be with them to the end of the age (cf. Mt 28:20). Trusting in the Lord who will not fail those whom he has called, the Church in Asia joyfully makes her pilgrim way into the Third Millennium."
