= Veritatis splendor =

1993 encyclical by Pope John Paul II, on the Church's approach to moral teaching

Veritatis splendor Latin for 'The Splendor of Truth' Encyclical of Pope John Paul II
- Signature date: 6 August 1993
- Subject: On some fundamental questions of the Church's Moral Teaching
- Number: 10 of 14 of the pontificate
- Text: In Latin; In English

Veritatis splendor (Latin: The Splendor of the Truth) is an encyclical by Pope John Paul II. It expresses the position of the Catholic Church regarding fundamentals of the Church's role in moral teaching. The encyclical is one of the most comprehensive and philosophical teachings of moral theology in the Catholic tradition. It was promulgated on 6 August 1993. Cardinal Georges Cottier was influential in drafting the encyclical, (Note: In an interview in 30Days, Cottier said: "Going back to the early years, the first "big" text I worked on was the social encyclical Centesimus annus. And then the Ut unum sint on ecumenicalism, the moral encyclical Veritatis splendor, and the Fides et ratio.) as was Servais-Théodore Pinckaers, a professor of moral theology at the University of Fribourg.

== Summary ==
Veritatis splendor responds to questions of moral theology that had been raised during the postconciliar period of the Church (events after the Vatican II ecumenical council of 1962-65). These questions revolve around man's ability to discern good, the existence of evil, the role of human freedom and human conscience, mortal sin, and the authority of the magisterium of the Catholic Church in guiding man. In response to these, Pope John Paul II emphatically says that moral truth is knowable, that the choice of good or evil has a profound effect on one's relationship with God, and that there is no true contradiction between freedom and following the good. Veritatis splendor consists of three chapters: (I) Teacher, What Good Must I Do; (II) Do Not Be Conformed to this World; and (III) Lest the Cross of Christ be Emptied of its Power.

=== Response to moral relativism ===
Veritatis splendor begins by asserting that there are indeed absolute truths accessible to all persons. Contrary to the philosophy of moral relativism, the encyclical says that moral law is universal across people in varying cultures, and is in fact rooted in the human condition. Pope John Paul teaches that no matter how separated someone is from God, "in the depths of his heart there always remains a yearning for absolute truth and a thirst to attain full knowledge of it." He goes on to say that the splendor of truth "shines forth deep within the human spirit."

=== Moral authority of the Catholic Church ===
Ultimately, John Paul teaches, "to ask about the good, in fact, ultimately means to turn towards God, the fullness of goodness." Against the idea that the Church's teaching body has a mainly exhortatory role, the pope reiterates the Catholic doctrine that the magisterium of the Catholic Church has authority to definitively pronounce on moral questions. Even more, John Paul teaches that the Church is Christ's particular response to help answer everyone's question of what is right and wrong.

=== Human freedom and divine law ===
John Paul teaches that there is no true conflict between human freedom and God's law. The true end of human freedom is growth as a mature person into how each is created by God. Furthermore, God's divine law governing human behavior is not opposed to human freedom, but rather "it protects and promotes that freedom."

The encyclical affirms that today's respect for human freedom "represents one of the positive achievements of modern culture." However, he cautions, though it is good, human freedom is not in itself an absolute. Merely deciding for oneself that one may do something is not at all a true substitute for determining whether something is in fact good or bad. Because God is the true author of good, it remains of critical importance to understand how the divine Law, as expressed by the authoritative magisterium of the Church, considers an issue before determining absolutely for oneself.

=== Natural law ===
The pope welcomes and supports the role of human reason in discovering and applying the natural law (those aspects of the moral law that may be discovered without divine revelation). Nevertheless, because God remains the true author of moral law, he states that human reason will not properly supersede the elements of the moral law that are of divine origin—the encyclical states that this "would be the death of true freedom." In particular, John Paul denies those ideas of morality that treat the human body as a "raw datum," separating man and how he uses his body from his greater meaning derived from the entirety of his person.

=== The judgment of conscience ===
John Paul reiterates the longstanding Catholic teaching that people are obliged to follow their conscience, and that if they do not, they are condemned by their own conscience.

He depicts conscience as an inner dialogue. However, he says, it is not merely a dialogue of man with himself, but also one between man and God. Following Bonaventure, John Paul compares conscience to a divine messenger which proclaims God's divine law. Contrary to its presentation elsewhere, John Paul states that conscience does not substitute the divine law. Rather, it is the process by which man applies that law to the moral dilemma at hand.

Veritatis splendor states that because the judgment of the conscience may be errant, a person has an obligation to ensure that their conscience is informed always and everywhere. Hence, it is necessary to understand what the divine law, as expressed through Church teaching, is and the reasons behind it. Even if a person does not possess a guilty conscience for committing a morally wrong act, its commission causes damage to the soul in other ways, and, if habitual, can inhibit a person from perceiving truth. John Paul goes so far as to say that habitual sin enslaves man and so following a wrong judgment of conscience is in the end a step away from freedom.

=== The "fundamental option", sin, and salvation ===
The encyclical also responds to the idea of the "fundamental option." In this way of thinking, a man's particular actions do not necessarily affect his ultimate salvation—what is important is his fundamental orientation towards or against God. The pope writes:

"There is no doubt that Christian moral teaching, even in its Biblical roots, acknowledges the specific importance of a fundamental choice which qualifies the moral life and engages freedom on a radical level before God. It is a question of the decision of faith, of the obedience of faith (cf. Rom 16:26) "by which man makes a total and free self-commitment to God, offering 'the full submission of intellect and will to God as he reveals' "."

John Paul firmly opposes the theological assertion that such a fundamental choice can be separated from particular actions, stating that it is contrary to Scripture as well as to long-held Catholic teaching on sin and salvation. He also opposes it on philosophical grounds, writing, "To separate the fundamental option from concrete kinds of behaviour means to contradict the substantial integrity or personal unity of the moral agent in his body and in his soul."

John Paul emphasizes that the "fundamental option" view undermines the traditional Catholic understanding on mortal sin and venial sin, their distinction, and effects: "For mortal sin exists also when a person knowingly and willingly, for whatever reason, chooses something gravely disordered.... The person turns away from God and loses charity."

=== Reality of intrinsically evil acts ===
The encyclical also says that certain acts are intrinsically evil. In the language of Catholic moral theology, this means that certain acts are always wrong, and that there are never circumstances in which they may be permitted if done knowingly and intentionally. Stated another way, this is a strong support for the long-held doctrine of Catholic moral theology that "the ends do not justify the means." John Paul bases this on the argument that certain acts are so destructive to the human person that there are no extenuating circumstances that would allow them. As an example, John Paul specifically mentions the teaching of Pope Paul VI on contraception, which stipulates that although it is permissible to tolerate a lesser evil to prevent a greater one, or to promote a greater good, it is never permissible, even in the gravest of circumstances to intentionally do an evil so that good may come of it. Or in other words it is never permissible to intend directly something which contradicts a moral order. This reiterates Paul VI's teaching on contraception, and that if an act is intrinsically evil, a good intention or particular circumstances can diminish their evil, but they cannot remove it.

=== Possibility of obeying the commandments ===
John Paul teaches that man can and must respect the norm of morality even in the most difficult situations: "Temptations can be overcome, sins can be avoided, because together with the commandments the Lord gives us the possibility of keeping them." He rejected the proposition that the Church's teaching is essentially only an "ideal" which must then be adapted to each case.

== See also ==
- List of Encyclicals of Pope John Paul II
- Personalism
- Theology of the Body
