= Catechesi tradendae =

1979 apostolic exhortation by Pope John Paul II

Catechesi tradendae Latin for 'Catechesis in Our Time' Apostolic exhortation of Pope John Paul II
- Signature date: 16 October 1979
- Number: 1 of 15 of the pontificate
- Text: In English

Catechesi tradendae (Catechesis in Our Time) is a post-synodal apostolic exhortation of Pope John Paul II, published October 16, 1979, on the topic of catechesis in the contemporary period.

The exhortation is addressed to the bishops, clergy and faithful of the whole Church.

This document was used to conclude the Fourth General Assembly of the Synod of Bishops held in Rome in 1977 under Pope Paul VI, with the theme 'Catechesis in Our Time', with particular reference to the catechesis of children and young people. The work of drafting this document was initiated by Pope Paul VI, based on documents of the Synod Fathers, continued by John Paul I and completed by John Paul II.
