= Ecclesia in America =

1999 apostolic exhortation by Pope John Paul II

Ecclesia in America Latin for 'The Church in America' Apostolic exhortation of Pope John Paul II
- Signature date: 22 January 1999
- Number: 11 of 15 of the pontificate
- Text: In English

Ecclesia in America is the apostolic exhortation written by Pope John Paul II, published on 22 January 1999. The exhortation follows up on the Special Assembly for America of the Synod of Bishops, which met in the Vatican from 16 November to 12 December 1997. It addresses the Church in the Americas.

The document helped to show how gospel-centered evangelization could be authentically Catholic. It declared: "The vital core of the new evangelization must be a clear and unequivocal proclamation of the person of Jesus Christ, that is, the preaching of his name, his teaching, his life, his promise of the Kingdom which he has gained for us by his Pascal Mystery. (Para 66)"
