= Ecclesia de Eucharistia =

2003 papal encyclical by Pope John Paul II

Ecclesia de Eucharistia Latin for 'The Church from the Eucharist' Encyclical of Pope John Paul II
- Signature date: 17 April 2003
- Subject: The Eucharist in its relationship with the Church
- Number: 14 of 14 of the pontificate
- Text: In Latin; In English

Ecclesia de Eucharistia (The Church from the Eucharist) is an encyclical by Pope John Paul II published on April 17, 2003. Its title, as is customary, is taken from the opening words of the Latin version of the text, which is rendered in the English translation as "The Church draws her life from the Eucharist". He discusses the centrality of the Eucharist to the definition and mission of the Church and says he hopes his message will "effectively help to banish the dark clouds of unacceptable doctrine and practice, so that the Eucharist will continue to shine forth in all its radiant mystery." He explored themes familiar from his earlier writings, including the profound connection between the Eucharist and the priesthood. It drew as well on his personal experiences saying Mass.

Throughout his pontificate, John Paul II wrote an annual letter to priests on Holy Thursday. On his 25th Holy Thursday as pope, he issued this encyclical instead, addressed to all Catholics: "to the bishops, priests and deacons, men and women in the consecrated life and all the lay faithful". It was the last of his fourteen encyclicals.

== Content ==
The text of Ecclesia de Eucharistia consists of an introduction, six chapters and a conclusion, the entirety divided into 62 sections.

Introduction

The introduction opens with the words "The Church draws her life from the Eucharist." Since the Eucharist "stands at the centre of the Church's life", it is "the most precious possession which the Church can have in her journey through history". John Paul regrets that Eucharistic adoration "has been almost completely abandoned" in some places and that the Eucharist is not always properly honored, sometimes reduced to "simply a fraternal banquet" or "a form of proclamation" that obscures its sacramental character. An ecumenical impulse that seeks to express confraternity with non-Catholic Christians has led to violations of the Church's discipline in celebrating the Eucharist. He writes, therefore, to emphasize and remind all Catholics of the true nature of the Eucharist and to restore proper understanding and practice, because "The Eucharist is too great a gift to tolerate ambiguity and depreciation."

1. The Mystery of Faith

John Paul writes: "The Church has received the Eucharist from Christ her Lord not as one gift ... among so many others, but as the gift par excellence, for it is the gift of himself, of his person in his sacred humanity, as well as the gift of his saving work." He explains that the sacrament of the Eucharist is not a reenactment of Christ's sacrifice but makes His sacrifice present again. In Communion, Christ offers himself as nourishment, which "spurs us on our journey through history and plants a seed of living hope in our daily commitment to the work before us".

2. The Eucharist Builds the Church

The Eucharist constitutes an experience of fraternity: "The Eucharist, precisely by building up the Church, creates human community." Therefore outside of the celebration of Mass, the Eucharist must be a focus of adoration.

3. The Apostolicity of the Eucharist and of the Church

The celebration of the Eucharist lies at the center of the deposit of faith received from the Apostles and must remain unchanged, true its apostolic inheritance. The role of the priest is critical, a priest ordained by a bishop who is part of the apostolic succession. There are therefore important distinctions to be maintained when considering the communion rites of Protestants, here referred to as "the Ecclesial Communities which arose in the West from the sixteenth century onwards and are separated from the Catholic Church". Catholics must not receive communion in those churches, nor can an ecumenical service substitute for attendance at Mass. Priests should celebrate Mass daily, both for the sake of their own ministry and as an example to vocations. The "praiseworthy" activities of eucharistic ministers in the absence of a priest must always be considered temporary.

4. The Eucharist and Ecclesial Communion

The Eucharist presupposes a community that it will bring to perfection. That community requires a life of grace. The sacrament of Penance allows the faithful to prepare themselves for the Eucharist by unburdening their consciences of sin. Communion must be denied to those who visibly persist in grave sin, and it is only available to the baptized who accept fully the true faith of the Eucharist. A community that celebrates the Eucharist must be in harmony with its bishop and the pope, and Sunday Mass is of fundamental importance to our expression of community. Following norms demonstrates love for the Eucharist and the Church. For all these reasons, concelebration or "Eucharistic sharing" with non-Catholic Christians is completely unacceptable, though communion maybe administered to non-Catholics in certain circumstances, to those who—and here John Paul quotes his earlier encyclical Ut Unum Sint—"greatly desire to receive these sacraments [Eucharist, Penance and Anointing of the Sick], freely request them and manifest the faith which the Catholic Church professes". These are norms "from which no dispensation can be given".

5. The Dignity of the Eucharistic Celebration

The celebration of the Eucharist requires "outward forms' that correspond to its internal, spiritual significance. John Paul cites architecture, "designs of altars and tabernacle, and music. Turning from the arts in "lands of ancient Christian heritage", John Paul discusses the work of adaptation to other cultures known as "inculturation". He underscores its value, warns that it must always correspond to the ineffable mystery of the Eucharist, and advises "careful review on the part of the competent ecclesiastical authorities", specifically the Holy See. He condemns "a misguided sense of creativity" and "unauthorized innovations which are often completely inappropriate". He promises a document on norms for Eucharistic celebrations will be forthcoming.

6. At the School of Mary, "Woman of the Eucharist"

John Paul considers the relationship of Mary to the Eucharist and considers her role as a model of Eucharistic faith.

Conclusion

== Responses ==
The Anglican Communion welcomed the document as the basis for additional study by the Anglican Roman Catholic International Commission (ARCIC) and the International Anglican Roman Catholic Commission for Unity and Mission (IARCCUM) as they explore the path to "fuller eucharistic sharing". Pastor Gilles Daudé, head of ecumenical relations for the Protestant Federation of France expressed concern that John Paul's fear that the Eucharist might not be accorded the full reverence it deserves may "freeze the advances on Eucharistic hospitality between Catholics and Protestants, even though those who practice it are often those who are best trained" and, ministry aside, "there are many more things that unite us than things that divide us".

In Eucharist as Meaning, Joseph C. Mudd of Gonzaga University wrote that in this encyclical John Paul adopted "a naïve realist understanding of eucharistic presence" when he quoted Paul VI's statement "that in objective reality, independently of our mind, the bread and wine have ceased to exist after consecration. Mudd was questioning the notion of an objectivity that "can be attained without minds" (emphasis in original).

Considering the implications of Ecclesia for the relationship between the Catholic Church and evangelicals, Mark Noll wrote that it would resonate with those Protestants who adhere to the idea of the real presence rather than communion as a memorial, though all would welcome its reliance on Scripture. He believed that "It is obvious that John Paul II teaches a Eucharist doctrine closer to what the Protestant reformers [Luther, Melancthon] themselves advocated than to what they condemned in the sixteenth century", including even his discussion of transubstantiation. He nevertheless concluded that "it is nevertheless evident that the institutional life of the Catholic Church enjoys a prominence in defining a foundational Christian reality that evangelicals do not allow for any human institution."

== See also ==
- Mirae caritatis, Leo XIII (28 May 1902)
- Mediator Dei, Pius XII (20 November 1947)
- Mysterium fidei, Paul VI (3 September 1965)
- Dominicae Cenae, John Paul II (24 February 1980)
