= Apostolic exhortation =

Magisterial document written by the pope

An apostolic exhortation is a magisterial document written by the pope. Some experts regard it as third in importance among papal documents, after apostolic constitutions and encyclicals. It generally encourages a particular virtue or activity.

Apostolic exhortations are frequently issued following a Synod of Bishops in which case they are known as post-synodal apostolic exhortations. They do not define Church doctrine and are not considered legislative.

== Examples ==
=== Pope Pius XII ===
- Menti nostrae (The sanctity of priestly life, 1950)

=== Pope Paul VI ===
- Marialis Cultus (For the Right Ordering and Development of Devotion to the Blessed Virgin Mary), Feb. 2, 1974
- Evangelii nuntiandi (Evangelization in the Modern World, 1975)

=== Pope John Paul II ===
- Catechesi tradendae (Catechesis in Our Time, 1979)
- Familiaris consortio (The Christian Family in the Modern World, 1981)
- Christifideles laici (Christ's Faithful People, 1988)
- Ecclesia in America (The Church in America, 1999)
- Ecclesia in Asia (The Church in Asia, 1999)
- Ecclesia in Europa (The Church in Europe, 2003)
- Pastores gregis (For the Hope of the World, 2003)

=== Pope Benedict XVI ===
- Africae munus (Africa's Commitment, 2011)
- Sacramentum caritatis (The Sacrament of Love, 2007)
- Verbum Domini (The Word of the Lord, 2010)

=== Pope Francis ===
- Evangelii gaudium (The Joy of the Gospel, 2013)
- Amoris laetitia (The Joy of Love, 2016)
- Gaudete et exsultate (Rejoice and Be Glad, 2018)
- Christus vivit (Christ is Alive, 2019)
- Querida Amazonia (Beloved Amazon, 2020), a post-synodal exhortation on the Amazon Region
- Laudate Deum (Praise God, 2023)
- C'est la confiance (It is confidence, 2023)

At the conclusion of the Sixteenth Ordinary General Assembly of the Synod of Bishops (the "Synod on Synodality") in October 2024, Pope Francis said that he would not be issuing an apostolic exhortation to commend the synod's conclusions to the Church and wider world, stating that the Synodal Document itself was sufficient for this purpose.

=== Pope Leo XIV ===
- Dilexi te (I have loved you, 2025)
