= Our Lady of the Amazon =

Catholic title of the Blessed Virgin Mary

- Original image of Our Lady of the Amazon, created by Lara Denys in 2011

Mother of the Amazon Mãe Cabocla (Caboclo Mother)
- Venerated in: Catholic Church
- Major shrine: Church and Sanctuary of Our Lady of the Amazon, Manaus, Brazil
- Feast: August 12
- Attributes: Victoria amazonica (giant water lily), white orchids, Indigenous Christ Child
- Patronage: Our Lady of the Amazon Missionary Area; peoples of the Amazon

Our Lady of the Amazon (Portuguese: Nossa Senhora da Amazônia) is a Catholic title of the Blessed Virgin Mary established in 2011 by the Roman Catholic Archdiocese of Manaus in Amazonas, Brazil. Created as an expression of inculturation among Amazonian peoples, the image was designed by local artist Lara Denys and depicts Mary and the Christ Child with Indigenous and caboclo features, standing upon a giant water lily (Victoria amazonica) surrounded by white orchids.

Her liturgical feast day is celebrated on August 12. The devotion inspired the creation of the Our Lady of the Amazon Missionary Area in 2015 and a Marian shrine currently under construction on the banks of the Rio Negro in Manaus.

== History ==
The devotion originated on November 3, 2010, when the Loureiro family donated an 11,700-square-meter plot of land in the Ponta Negra neighborhood of Manaus to the Archdiocese for the construction of a Marian church. In 2011, under Archbishop Luiz Soares Vieira and coordinated by Father Reneu Stefanello, the Archdiocese held a national design contest to create a Marian image reflecting local Amazonian culture. The winning design by 23-year-old artist Lara Denys was unveiled during an open-air Mass in front of the Amazon Theatre, attended by approximately 2,000 people. The date of the first Mass celebrated on the donated land, August 12, became the title's annual feast day.

On December 9, 2015, the Archdiocese formally established the Our Lady of the Amazon Missionary Area, which was inaugurated on March 13, 2016, by Archbishop Sérgio Eduardo Castriani with Father Stefanello, a Pallottine priest, as its first pastor. While a small church currently serves the local community, plans for a permanent 2,000-square-meter sanctuary shaped like a giant water lily were submitted to the city of Manaus in 2023. Its cornerstone was blessed in December 2023, and construction remained underway as of September 2026.

Reproductions of the image have been presented to the papacy on multiple occasions. Pope Francis received a copy in 2019 and a framed painting of the image in October 2024 from Cardinal Leonardo Ulrich Steiner, Archbishop of Manaus. In September 2026, Pope Leo XIV was presented with a wooden sculpture of Our Lady of the Amazon by Peruvian Cardinal Pedro Barreto.

== Iconography and devotion ==
Denys's design portrays Mary with caboclo skin and facial features, wearing a dark blue mantle, a white veil symbolizing purity, and a dress patterned after Waimiri-Atroari Indigenous art. She holds the Indigenous Christ Child in a traditional Amazonian baby sling. Mary stands upon a Victoria amazonica water lily—chosen to represent strength and resilience—surrounded by white orchids representing femininity.

Within the Catholic Church, the title represents an effort to inculturate Marian devotion into regional ethnic identities, comparable to Our Lady of Guadalupe in Mexico and Our Lady of Nazareth in northern Brazil. Anthropologists have also noted that the creation of a regionally identifiable Marian figure served to strengthen Catholic identity in response to the rapid growth of Pentecostalism in the Amazon basin.

== 2019 Amazon Synod controversy ==
During the Synod of Bishops for the Pan-Amazon region at the Vatican in October 2019, wooden carvings of a naked pregnant woman—widely referred to in the media as the Andean deity Pachamama—were displayed at events in the Vatican Gardens and at the church of Santa Maria in Traspontina. After some media outlets and a Portuguese-language Vatican News broadcast mistakenly referred to the carvings as "Our Lady of the Amazon", officials from the Pan-Amazonian Ecclesial Network (REPAM) and the Vatican clarified that the statues were symbols of life and fertility rather than representations of the Virgin Mary or of the Manaus devotion.

== See also ==
- Inculturation
- Synod of Bishops for the Pan-Amazon region
