= Querida Amazonia =

2020 apostolic exhortation of Pope Francis

Querida Amazonia Spanish for 'Beloved Amazon' Apostolic exhortation of Pope Francis
- Signature date: 2 February 2020
- Subject: On the Pan-Amazon region
- Number: 5 of 7 of the pontificate
- Text: In English
- AAS: 112 (3): 232-273

Querida Amazonia (Beloved Amazonia) is a 2020 post-synodal apostolic exhortation of Pope Francis, written in response to the Synod of Bishops for the Pan-Amazon region held in Rome in October 2019. Focusing on the Amazon region of South America, it is addressed "to the people of God and to all persons of good will". The document is dated 2 February 2020, the liturgical feast of Candlemas, and was released by the Holy See Press Office at a press conference on 12 February.

Originally written in Spanish, the exhortation was also published in English, Italian, French, German, Portuguese, Polish, Arabic, and Chinese (both traditional and simplified characters). The 16,000 words of the English translation are organized into 111 paragraphs in four chapters, each of which is dedicated to a "great dream": social, cultural, ecological and ecclesial.

Prior to its official release, speculation arose that Querida Amazonia would allow the ordination of married men who are already permanent deacons, viri probati (Latin for 'men of proven faith') to the priesthood, to address a shortage of priests in the Amazon. This proposal had been called for by the final document of the synod, and approved by a majority of the bishops in attendance, in spite of the Catholic Church's long-standing practice of clerical celibacy in the Latin Church. The exhortation does not explicitly endorse married priests, instead stating that a "way must be found" for priests to bring the Eucharist to remote areas, while also calling for women to be given greater roles in the church, but not within the holy orders of the diaconate or the priesthood. In addition, Francis makes no mention of an Amazonian rite of the Mass, despite it also being a subject of debate at the synod, but states that efforts of inculturation should be made, to "respect native forms of expression in song, dance, rituals, gestures and symbols".

== Background ==
On 15 October 2017, Pope Francis announced that a special assembly of the Synod of Bishops would be held in 2019, to "identify new paths for the evangelisation of this portion of the People of God", specifically indigenous peoples, in light of the "crisis" of the Amazon rainforest's deforestation. The synod's working document (instrumentum laboris), entitled "Amazonia: new paths for the Church and for an integral ecology", was published on 17 June 2019. The key issues of the instrumentum laboris were the ordination of married men, the role for women in the church, and environmental concerns. The working document drew polarized reactions among Catholics, with Peruvian cardinal Pedro Barreto saying that it "largely expresses the feelings and desires of many representatives of the Amazon people", whereas German cardinal Walter Brandmüller condemned it as "heretical" and called for it to be rejected.

More than 200 participants, including 185 voting bishops, gathered in Rome from 6 to 27 October 2019 for the synod. On 26 October, the concluding day of the assembly, the synod's final document was released, including an article in which the bishops proposed that married permanent deacons be considered for ordination as priests following an "adequate formation", which was approved by a vote of 128–41, satisfying the requisite two-thirds majority for it to pass. The synodal document's conclusions were then presented to Francis to issue an apostolic exhortation on the issues discussed.

== Contents ==
Francis begins Querida Amazonia by describing the exhortation as a "brief framework for reflection" in light of the synod's final document, without intending to supplant it, and urges all to read it in full. The document's introduction also sets forth the "four great dreams" that the Amazon region inspires in him, which are subsequently individually explored in the four succeeding chapters.

In the first chapter, entitled "A Social Dream", Francis focuses on improving the quality of life of the Amazonian people, underscoring the need to assist the poor. He addresses the "injustice and crime" faced by such peoples, caused by industries in the rainforest such as timber and mining, and criticizes a conception of the region as a place to be developed, which does not respect indigenous rights. Moreover, he also says that outrage needs to be felt in the face of injustice and cruelty suffered by them, and asks for forgiveness for the failings of the church and wider society in the Amazon region, noting that it is possible to overcome "colonizing mentalities" with solidarity. He ends the chapter with a reflection on the "broken institutions" of civil society, and calls for dialogue to take place with the poor of the Amazon.

The second chapter of the exhortation, "A Cultural Dream", utilizes a positive approach towards indigenous peoples, emphasizing that promotion of the Amazon does not imply cultural colonialism. Describing the region as a "polyhedron", Francis deplores the exile of the indigenous from their homes into regional cities, and the subsequent loss of their cultural identities, also urging young people to assume responsibility for their roots. Furthermore, he also encourages an "intercultural encounter", rejecting colonialism and indigenism, observing that a culture can "grow barren" when it isolates itself from dialogue.

The document's third chapter, "An Ecological Dream", recalls Benedict XVI's teaching on "human ecology", referencing also Francis's own encyclical Laudato si'. He again condemns multinational corporations and "powerful industries" for harming the Amazonian environment, and stresses the importance of water, referring to the Amazon River as the "spinal column that creates harmony and unity". Francis also highlights the need to learn from indigenous peoples, as well as a theological "prophecy of contemplation" for believers to encounter in the region. He calls for ecological teaching to overcome modern consumerism in the region, an initiative to which, he says, the church can also contribute.

"An Ecclesial Dream", the final chapter, comprising almost half the document, examines the role of the Catholic Church in the Amazon. Francis affirms the Great Commission of preaching the gospel in order to confront the region's problems, underlining the importance of kerygma. He also explores paths of inculturation in the Amazon, to bring goodness in existing cultures to "fulfilment in the light of the Gospel", extolling pre-Columbian cultures and the tradition of Christian wisdom. Despite this, he does not discuss a new Amazonian rite of the Mass, but supports the inclusion of elements of indigenous culture in the liturgy. Furthermore, he calls for the church to "offer understanding, comfort and acceptance", instead of turning people away. On the topic of priests in the region, Francis states that the process of priestly formation should be revised, but makes no mention of the ordination of viri probati in providing isolated communities access to the Eucharist. Instead, he accentuates the role of the laity in spiritual formation, while emphasizing that priests remain necessary to preside over the liturgy. In addition, Francis addresses the "strength and gift" of women, praising their role in the Amazon, but asserts that efforts to ordain them would be reductionist and lead the church to "clericalize women, diminish the great value of what they have already accomplished, and subtly make their indispensable contribution less effective". He underlines the traditional importance of priests being male, and provides the example of the Virgin Mary as a model for women. In briefly exploring the possibilities arising from ecumenism and "interreligious coexistence", he invites believers to seek opportunities to talk to each other. The exhortation concludes with a prayer addressed to Mary, under the title of "mother of the Amazon region".

== Reception ==
Querida Amazonia drew mixed reactions from Catholic commentators, with those regarded as conservative generally approving of Francis's approach, while those considered progressives largely expressed disappointment at the lack of major announcements of changes to church practice.

Cardinal Gerhard Ludwig Müller called the exhortation a "document of reconciliation", stating that it seeks to reduce internal factions within the church. Journalist Edward Pentin commended Francis for not endorsing viri probati, but criticized the document's "full adherence" to the principles of liberation theology, especially that of Brazilian theologian Leonardo Boff. Archbishop José Horacio Gómez, President of the United States Conference of Catholic Bishops, praised the exhortation's focus on integral ecology, as did Archbishop Mark Coleridge of Brisbane, noting that the document also addressed "issues critical to the Australian context".

Traditionalist Catholic journalist Matthew Walther said the correct response to the encyclical should be joy, writing:

Here at last is a return to the great intellectual themes of Laudato si', the 2015 papal encyclical in which the Holy Father [Pope] first articulated his critique of the neoliberal revolution in economics, the globalized regime of spoliation, exploitation, infertility, and distractedness that make possible the supposed "economic miracle" of consumerism. For Francis all of these things — the climate crisis, wage slavery, the mirage of technological progress, greed — exist along a sinuous continuum of immiseration; the planet is being destroyed because we are destroying one another because we are destroying ourselves. In fact, I think it would even be a mistake to consider this exhortation a teaching document in any narrowly pedagogical sense. Instead it should be welcomed on the terms in which it is presented: as a dream, one that all persons of good will can dream together.

On the other hand, American-born Colombian bishop Robert Herman Flock disapproved of Francis's words, stating that he "simply kicked the can down the road". Jesuit priest James Martin said that, while Querida Amazonia did not explicitly mention the ordination of married priests or women, such proposals may still be up for discussion due to Francis "officially presenting" the synod's final document together with the exhortation.

The Women's Ordination Conference, a U.S. organization advocating the ordination of Catholic women, accused Francis of "willfully turning his back on the calls of women", while the Central Committee of German Catholics, a lay group, expressed disappointment with his "lack of courage to pursue real reforms". English writer Catherine Pepinster objected to a perceived suggestion that "clericalism is automatically part of the priesthood".
