= Šeper =

Seper or Šeper is a German, Hungarian and Croatian surname.

In Croatia, it is most common in Samobor area.

Variations of the surname include: Seper, Scheper, Sepehr, Schepper, Sepper, Sheper, Shepper, Shepher, Sepher and Sceper.

Notable people with the surname include:

- Ákos Seper (born 1979), Hungarian football player
- Franjo Šeper (1905–1981), Croatian prelate
