= Punta Negra =

Punta Negra may refer to:

- Punta Negra District, Peru
- Punta Negra Dam, Argentina
- Punta Negra, Uruguay

== See also ==
- Ponta Negra, Natal, Brazil
- Ponta Negra, Manaus, Brazil
- Pointe-Noire, Republic of the Congo
