= Viri probati =

Catholic term for men of proven faith and virtue

Viri probati (Latin for "proven men") is a term used in the Catholic Church for married men whose faith and conduct are considered suitable for ordained ministry. It is used in connection with married permanent deacons and with proposals to ordain selected married men as priests, particularly in places with too few priests.

== History ==
The expression draws on Clement of Rome's letter to the Corinthians. In its account of apostolic succession, section 44.2 says that the apostles provided for other "approved men" to succeed to their ministry. The Second Vatican Council cited this account in section 20 of its constitution Lumen gentium.

In the Western Church, the diaconate gradually became an intermediate stage in preparation for the priesthood. The Second Vatican Council provided for its restoration as a permanent ministry in the Latin Church. Its 1964 constitution Lumen gentium allowed the ordination of mature married men as permanent deacons, subject to papal approval.

Pope Paul VI set out rules for the restored diaconate in his 1967 apostolic letter Sacrum diaconatus ordinem. Married candidates had to be at least 35 years old and have their wives' consent. Deacons were prohibited from marrying after ordination. This also applied to a widowed deacon. The Holy See's 1998 norms described grounds for a dispensation allowing remarriage, including the need to care for young children.

Married men were also ordained secretly in Czechoslovakia under communist rule. In 1997, the Vatican allowed 22 married Latin priests ordained in this way to join the Byzantine-Slav exarchate in the Czech Republic. Some underwent conditional ordination, a rite used to resolve doubts about the validity of their earlier ordinations.

== Proposals for priestly ordination ==
The proposals concern the Latin Church, where priestly celibacy is the general rule. Married priests already serve in the Eastern Catholic Churches. Exceptions also exist in the Latin Church for some married former Anglican clergy who become Catholics.

Writing in 2001, Peter Krämer described a possible change in church law that would allow diocesan bishops to grant dispensations for married candidates, subject to guidelines from their bishops' conference. He also noted that the pope could already grant such dispensations. Krämer argued for keeping priestly celibacy because of its spiritual value in the Church's tradition.

=== Second Vatican Council and Würzburg synod ===
During the Second Vatican Council, some bishops proposed ordaining older married men to celebrate Mass in places with a severe shortage of priests. The proposal was not adopted. Paul VI reserved the question of priestly celibacy for his own consideration and a subsequent encyclical. The 1971 Synod of Bishops also rejected a proposal to ordain viri probati.

The question was discussed at the Würzburg Synod in West Germany. Its resolution on parish ministry recorded arguments both for and against ordaining men with proven experience of marriage and working life. Supporters pointed to the shortage of priests and the availability of trained laymen. Opponents questioned whether the change would provide enough priests and feared that it would weaken the celibate priesthood. The resolution acknowledged that exceptional pastoral emergencies could require ordaining married men. It stated that the synod could not decide the issue because of a decision by the German bishops' conference of 13 April 1972. It called on the bishops to examine the pastoral needs of German parishes and possible ways of meeting them.

=== Discussion in 2017–2018 ===
In a March 2017 interview with the German weekly Die Zeit, Pope Francis said that the Church should consider whether viri probati could be ordained and what duties they might undertake, for example in remote communities. He also rejected voluntary celibacy as a solution to the shortage of priests.

Cardinal Karl Lehmann responded that the issue had never been settled and had become more urgent as the shortage of priests increased. Cardinal Reinhard Marx, then chairman of the German Bishops' Conference, said that exceptional circumstances in remote areas needed consideration. He said that any decision would have to be made for the Church as a whole, with its consequences taken into account.

In a May 2018 homily at Chartres Cathedral, Cardinal Robert Sarah opposed ordaining viri probati for pastoral reasons. He argued that it would break with apostolic tradition. He linked priestly celibacy to the priest's union with Christ on the cross.

=== Amazon synod and papal response ===
Ahead of the synod, supporters of ordaining viri probati argued that candidates should come from the communities they would serve. Suggested training resembled programmes for permanent deacons in the United States, with evening or weekend classes over about three years. Critics questioned whether these priests would have the same standing as seminary-trained clergy and whether an exception for remote areas would lead to wider changes to celibacy.

The working document for the 2019 Amazon synod, published on 17 June 2019, proposed studying the ordination of older men respected by their communities, preferably Indigenous men, including those with stable families. At its presentation, Cardinal Lorenzo Baldisseri questioned the use of viri probati to describe the proposal and said that the term was being overused.

The synod's final document, adopted on 26 October 2019, proposed establishing criteria for ordaining suitable married men in the most remote parts of the Amazon region. Candidates would need a stable family, experience as permanent deacons and appropriate training for the priesthood. The proposal aimed to make the Eucharist, confession and anointing of the sick more readily available to communities that might otherwise wait months or years for a priest. Some synod participants favoured considering the issue for the wider Church. The document did not use the expression viri probati.

Francis's subsequent apostolic exhortation Querida Amazonia, published on 12 February 2020, introduced no new permission to ordain married men. It called for more missionary priests and permanent deacons in the region and greater participation by laypeople in community life.
