= Acufida =

Acufida was an ancient town and bishopric in Mauretania, and is now a Latin Catholic titular see.

It was located near Cafrida, in modern Algeria.

== History ==
Acufida gained sufficient importance as a town in the Roman province of Mauretania Sitifensis to become a Catholic diocese, suffragan of the provincial Metropole, but eventually faded.

=== Titular see ===
The diocese was nominally restored as a Latin titular see in 1933. It was renamed Acafida in 1944, but the name was switched back to Acufida in 1971.

It has had the following incumbents, all of the lowest (episcopal) rank:

- Janez Jenko (17 April 1964 – 17 October 1977), later Bishop of Koper
- Louis Phạm Văn Nẫm (3 December 1977 – 30 June 2001)
- Pedro Ricardo Barreto Jimeno, Jesuits (S.J.) (21 November 2001 – 17 July 2004), Apostolic Vicar of Jaén en Perú (21 November 2001 – 17 July 2004); later Metropolitan Archbishop of Huancayo (Peru) (17 July 2004 – present) and Apostolic Administrator of aforementioned Jaén en Perú (17 July 2004 – 11 November 2005)
- Vincent Barwa (29 September 2004 – 11 February 2008)
- Henrique Soares da Costa (1 April 2009 – 19 March 2014)
- José Roberto Fortes Palau, Auxiliary Bishop of São Paulo (Brazil) (30 April 2014 – present)
