= Congregation of Xavières =

Female religious institute

- L'institut La Xavière
- Nickname: The Xaviere
- Named after: Francis Xavier
- Formation: 1921
- Founder: Claire Monestès
- Founded at: Marseille
- Region served: Africa, Europe and America
- Members: 100
- Official language: French
- General Superior: Christine Danel
- Website: www.xavieres.org

Congregation of Xavières (French: Institut La Xavière) is an institute of religious sisters recognized by the Catholic Church on February 4, 1963, during the Second Vatican Council.

The institute was founded in France in 1921 by Claire Monestès with the support of Jesuit priest Antonin Eymieu and is a part of the Ignatian family of religious congregations. It has been of pontifical right since 2010.

== History ==
The congregation takes its name from the admiration that Claire Monestès had for the missionary work of Francis Xavier, who was one of Ignatius of Loyola's early companions. Ignatius, soon after founding the Society of Jesus, decided that the Society would not accept women. There are therefore no women Jesuits or Jesuit sisters as such, but many women's communities are inspired by Ignatian spirituality.

Claire Monestès opened her first community in Marseille with Léonie Fabre in 1921, notably to assist young working women. In a room on rue de Breteuil she opened a recreational center and restaurant for young women working near the Old Port.

In 1934, she founded a community in the parish of Saint-Médard in Paris, in the 5th arrondissement.

Claire Monestès died on February 14, 1939. The members of the congregation were between 20 and 35 years of age. They were dispersed with the outbreak of World War II.

It was not until 1960 that the community foundations in France came together again, those at Créteil, Toulouse, Nice, La Rochelle, and Aix-en-Provence. In 1967 they extended their work to Abidjan, Africa, in response to the call of the Jesuits to collaborate with INADES (African Institute for Economic and Social Development, now CERAP). Other foundings followed: in Korhogo, also in Ivory Coast, in 1972; in N'Djamena, Chad, in 1983; in Abobo, Abidjan, in 2002; in Yaoundé in 2006. The last foundation was in 2012.

In July 2017, Sister Christine Danel became the Superior General of Congregation.

In May 2019 Pope Francis named Xaviere sister Nathalie Becquart along with two other women as consultors for the General Secretariat for the Synod of Bishops on Young People, Faith, and Vocational Discernment, marking a historic first for the Catholic Church. In February 2020, she was made undersecretary of the Synod, making her the first woman to have a vote in that body. She had earlier served as the Director of the National Service for Youth Evangelization and Vocations in France, and was the first woman to hold that position.

Whether they are secretaries, youth leaders, doctors, engineers, librarians, theologians, teachers, chaplaincy leaders, psychologists, nurses, managers; whether they work in a company or provide school support, the Xaviere live in small communities, close to people's homes and workplace.

The Xaviere number about one hundred. They are spread over twenty communities on three continents: Africa, Europe and America.

== Bibliography ==
- Anne-Marie Aitken, xav, Paul Legavre, SJ, Paul Magnin et Anne Righini-Tapie, cvx, Naissance en France d'une famille ignatienne, in Christus, n°213, janvier 2007
- Étienne Ganty, Michel Hermans, François-Xavier Dumortier, Pierre Sauvage, Tradition jésuite : enseignement, spiritualité, mission, éd. Lessius, 2002. (ISBN 9782872991174)
- Hervé Yannou, Jésuites et compagnie, éd. Lethielleux, 2007. (ISBN 978-2283610312)
- Marie-Françoise Boutemy, Prier 15 jours avec Claire Monestès, fondatrice des xavières, éd. Nouvelle Cité, 2011, (ISBN 9782853136334)
- Geneviève Roux, Petite vie de Claire Monestès, Desclée de Brouwer, 2011, (ISBN 9782220062686)
