= Palace of the Bank of Italy (Naples) =

Coordinates: 40.8408°N 14.2511°E

Palace of Bank of Italy (Naples)
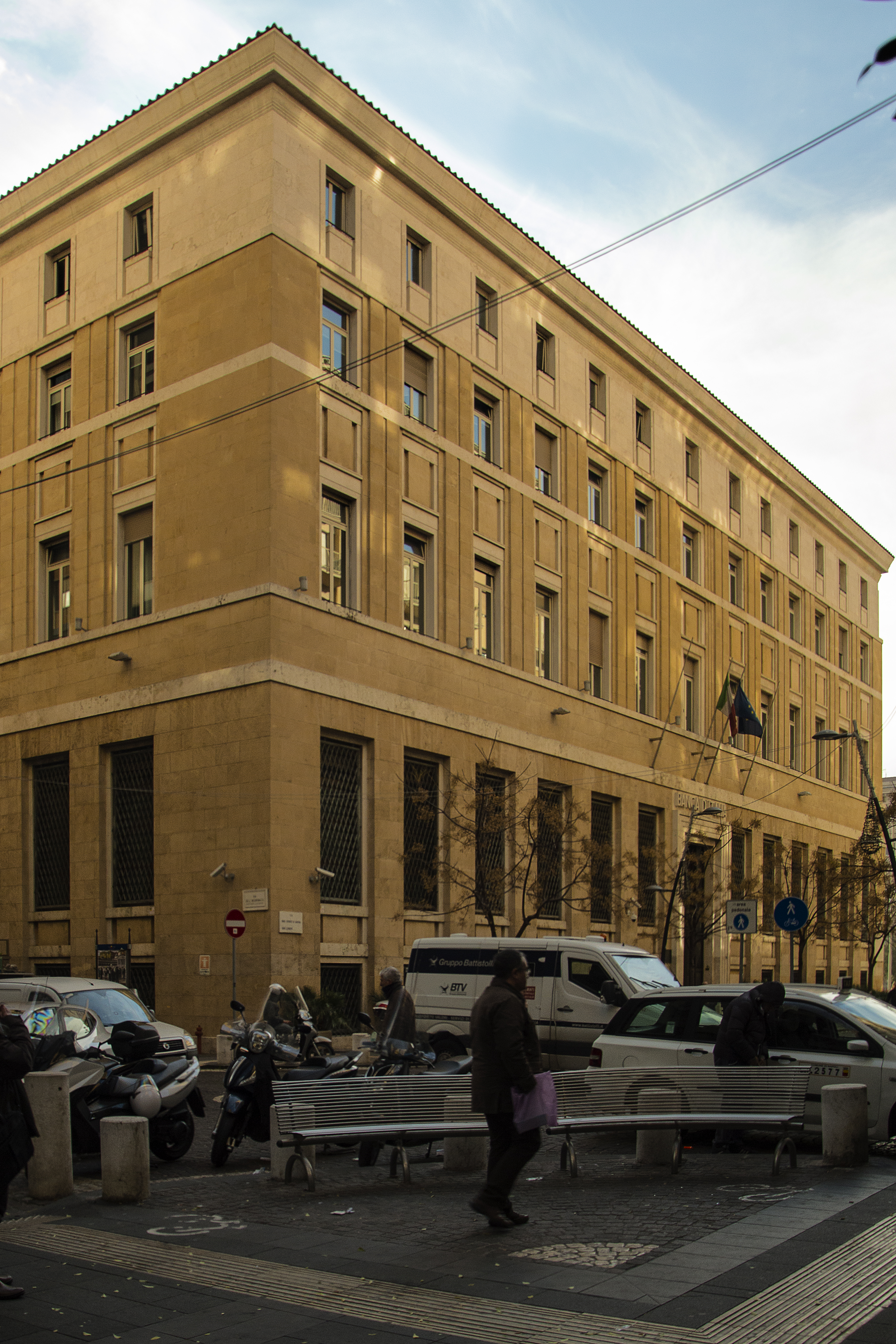
- Palace of Bank of Italy, Naples
- Interactive map of the Palace of Bank of Italy (Naples) area

General information
- Architectural style: Rationalist
- Location: Via Cervantes; Naples, Italy
- Construction started: 1939
- Completed: 1957
- Client: Bank of Italy

Design and construction
- Architects: Marcello Canino, Arnaldo Foschini

The Palace of the Bank of Italy is a twentieth century monumental building in central Naples, Italy located in Via Cervantes.

== History ==
The initial plans for this building were elaborated in 1937 by the office for urban renewal (Risanamento) of the Rione Carità of Naples. They planned to install one large building, housing the Bank of Italy, in the area between via Medina and the Piazza del Municipio, that by 1939 had been cleared of a number of older buildings and palaces. However the project was suspended during the second World War, and in 1949, a new competition for new plans was awarded to the firms of De Lieto and Ferrobeton, with their respective designers, Marcello Canino and Arnaldo Foschini, in charge of the project. They scaled down the project to two independent buildings for the site, although both have a similar style to each other. The Bank of Italy palace was completed in 1957.

== Description ==
The building occupies an area enclosed by the Piazza Municipio, Via Cervantes, Via dell'Incoronata, and the Mercato dei Grani. The composition is characterized by a massive block clad in stone and travertine interrupted by windows lined the basement and the first floor separated by pillars covered with stone. A double band in travertine separates the base from the block to C, characterized by the scanning line of windows interspersed with dividing walls that incorporate pilasters that create a dynamic rhythm in the facade. The top floor is completely covered in travertine and is concluded by a robust cornice.

The interior is characterized by a large first floor hall, which contains the 1956 works completed by Francesco Russo based on the ideas of the painter Giovanni Brancaccio. In other areas there are also mosaics depicting rural scenes and seascapes.
