= Herta Ottolenghi Wedekind =

German-born Italian textile artist and patron (1885–1953)

- Herta Ottolenghi Wedekind in the 1910s
- Born: Herta von Wedekind; 20 November 1885; Berlin, German Empire
- Died: 26 June 1953 (aged 67); Acqui Terme, Italy
- Known for: Tapestry, sculpture, and artistic patronage
- Spouse: Arturo Benvenuto Ottolenghi (m. 1914; d. 1951)
- Children: 1

Herta Ottolenghi Wedekind (20 November 1885 – 26 June 1953) was a German-born, naturalised Italian patron of the arts, textile artist and sculptor. She was particularly known for her tapestries made using inkblot-based designs, a technique known as klecksography, and for the artistic patronage she undertook with her husband, Arturo Benvenuto Ottolenghi, and their son Astolfo. Their patronage contributed, among other projects, to the design and construction of Villa Ottolenghi Wedekind in Acqui Terme, Italy.

== Biography ==
Herta von Wedekind was born on 20 November 1885 to Sophie Danzier and Paul Wedekind zu Horst, the fifth and youngest child of the couple. She came from a family of the German upper nobility involved in banking and business, and grew up in a wealthy and intellectually stimulating environment that encouraged her artistic interests.

Between 1910 and 1912, she pursued artistic training in Italy and Germany while staying at various family residences. She subsequently settled in Rome, where she developed her drawing and sculpting skills as a pupil of Hans Stoltenberg Lerche, a Norwegian sculptor and ceramic artist working in the German cultural sphere who was prominent at the time. His studio was located at 4 Via Flaminia.

During a stay in Germany in 1913, she met her future husband, Arturo Benvenuto Ottolenghi, a member of a wealthy Piedmontese family of Jewish origin who had moved to Germany to complete his law studies. They married in Rome on 19 April 1914 and lived there until 1920, in an apartment at 35 Via Giovanni Battista Morgagni in the Nomentano district. Their only child, Astolfo Carlo, was born there in February 1917. Herta set up a sculpture studio in their apartment, working with terracotta, clay, plaster and stone.

Herta continued to visit her teacher Stoltenberg Lerche until at least 1915. Between 1918 and 1919, she alternated periods in Rome with visits to the Schatzalp sanatorium in Davos, Switzerland, where she continued experimenting with sculpture and developed the idea of making tapestries. She sought relief from symptoms of tuberculosis, which she may have contracted in her youth. In 1920, partly because of her health problems and the death of Stoltenberg Lerche, the family moved to Genoa. The move also brought Arturo closer to his family and to the substantial property investments he had in the area.

Exhibitions of Herta Ottolenghi Wedekind

Display of her work at the first Monza Biennale

Her exhibition room at the second Monza Biennale

Ottolenghi Wedekind with her works at the 1925 Paris exhibition of decorative arts

During the family's time in Liguria, the Ottolenghis lived at the Art Nouveau villa of the Ceriana Mayneri counts in Pieve di Sori. Herta established another studio there, producing tapestries, carpets and furnishing fabrics in addition to sculpture. She developed a new method of textile decoration based on klecksography, which she patented in Turin in 1922. This marked the beginning of the most productive decade of her artistic career.

While living in Liguria, the Ottolenghis developed relationships with several artists, including the architect Federico D'Amato, whom they commissioned to work on their plan for a house devoted to art. The building was to be constructed on their land on the Monterosso hillside near Acqui.

In 1922, she first exhibited her tapestries at a fair in Munich. In 1923, she participated in the first Monza Biennale, exhibiting her textiles in a room dedicated to her work. Her work attracted the attention of critics, including Francesco Sapori. The municipality of Milan purchased two tapestries from the exhibition for the collections of its municipal art museum. The exhibition was also discussed in the contemporary illustrated magazine Il Secolo XX.

In 1925, she took part in the second Monza Biennale, exhibiting in room 80, and in the International Exhibition of Modern Decorative and Industrial Arts in Paris, in the section devoted to Italian artists. In 1926, she held a solo exhibition at the Friedmann & Weber Kunstgewerbehaus in Berlin. That year, she was also listed among artists active in Tegernsee in the Handbuch des Kunstmarktes, a German art-market directory; she maintained a studio in the town.

Herta Wedekind and Arturo Ottolenghi at the construction site of Villa Ottolenghi Wedekind, with two workers

In 1927, she exhibited tapestries and curtains at the third Monza Biennale. In the same year, according to the account in Gomiero, the death of the architect Francesco D'Amato forced Herta and Arturo to suspend work on the Acqui project for two years. The architect selected to replace him, Marcello Piacentini, was initially reluctant to accept the commission because of his many commitments as one of the leading architects under the Fascist regime. He agreed in 1929 on condition that he could work with the young architect Arnaldo Foschini.

In 1930, Herta participated in the fourth Monza Triennale, exhibiting tapestries in the textiles gallery and a carpet in the passageway between the two rooms of the Roman section.

From the 1930s onwards, she ceased producing tapestries and renewed her focus on sculpture. Many of her works were incorporated into Villa Ottolenghi Wedekind and the Ottolenghi care home in Acqui, an institution for elderly and sick people established in a fifteenth-century building. The care home opened in 1934 after a two-year renovation directed by Piacentini.

In April 1939, Arturo was targeted under the Italian racial laws because of his Jewish ancestry; he was arrested in 1944. According to a later account, Herta and her sister Julia von Knorr-Wedekind obtained documentation of Herta's ancestry, with assistance from staff at a hospital in Alessandria who cooperated with the partisans, helping to prevent Arturo's transfer to the Fossoli camp. Arturo remained under arrest for a further period and was released in early October.

In 1948, Herta visited the United States to see her son Astolfo, who had been living there for several years. During the visit, she donated two textiles to the Metropolitan Museum of Art in New York, which were subsequently displayed in the museum's textile gallery.

Arturo Ottolenghi died on 31 August 1951, leaving Herta a widow. That year, she published a collection of poetry, followed by two posthumous collections published in 1957 and 1970. Herta Ottolenghi Wedekind died in Acqui on 26 June 1953.

== Artistic work ==
A fashion study by Herta Wedekind, dated 1907

Herta Ottolenghi Wedekind worked in several artistic fields, including poetry, sculpture and textile crafts. A poem published by her son Astolfo in the posthumous volume Das Lied vom Ölbaum und Anderes suggests that artistic creation was a means for her to find release from the traumatic and painful experiences associated with her illness. Little is known of her artistic training before she entered Hans Stoltenberg Lerche's studio, although some albums containing fashion drawings and costume sketches survive. Her collaboration with the innovative and experimental Norwegian artist proved productive; his studio also functioned as a gallery, displaying works by Max Liebermann, Albert Besnard, Ivan Meštrović, Kees van Dongen and Auguste Rodin. Herta was particularly drawn to Rodin, to whom she dedicated a poem, and to his non finito technique, which suited her instinctive resistance to rigid outlines and forms.

Her first sculptures made in Stoltenberg Lerche's workshop impressed the art critic Vittorio Pica, who praised her technical skill and imaginative ability.

Her best-known works of the 1920s were tapestries decorated with motifs produced through klecksography, an inkblot technique. The method would not have been unfamiliar to her in Germany, where it had become known through the writings of the poet Justinus Kerner, particularly following the posthumous publication of Klecksographien in 1890. Interest in the suggestive potential of inkblot imagery was also reflected in the work of the psychologist Hermann Rorschach, who published his inkblot plates in 1921, the year Herta applied for a patent in Turin for her artistic use of the technique. In her own account, the method enabled her to develop an inexhaustible variety of new and original patterns that imagination alone could not produce, emphasising the creative value of chance. Although her use of arabesques and symmetrical forms associated with traditional batik textiles retained elements of Art Nouveau, her work also incorporated influences from Dada and Surrealism and, in some cases, anticipated aspects of postwar Abstract Expressionism.

Herta Wedekind with her sculpture of Saint Michael, photographed in 1936

In making her tapestries and carpets, Ottolenghi Wedekind worked in a manner comparable to a modern textile designer, establishing a production system in which a small group of assistants carried out her designs, following the example of Rosa Menni. Her closest collaborator was Brunilde Sapori, whose correspondence illustrates Herta's ability to inspire those working with her. (Note: In a 1927 letter to Herta, Brunilde wrote that she worked without enthusiasm because, since she had stopped working for Herta, she had produced nothing beautiful.)

After the 1920s, Herta moved away from the most productive phase of her textile work and devoted herself increasingly to overseeing the construction of Villa Ottolenghi Wedekind, described by critics as an "acropolis of the arts". Although she was only one of the patrons commissioning the villa, she became deeply involved, working directly with the participating artists, contributing ideas and making sketches for the arrangement of architectural and artistic features within the building. Her sculptures from this period were designed to occupy spaces within the villa without losing their independent artistic qualities, and they won the appreciation of Arturo Martini, one of the artists involved in the project. The two maintained an extensive correspondence and regarded each other's work as a source of inspiration. One of her most notable sculptures from this period was La bagnante (The Bather), which remains a focal point of the villa.

== Bibliography ==
- Gomiero, Giulia; Lago, Elena; Spinazzè, Sabrina, eds. (2021). Herta Ottolenghi Wedekind – il sogno dell'opera d'arte totale (PDF) (in Italian). Milan: Scalpendi. ISBN 9791259550460. Archived (PDF) from the original on 7 September 2025.
- Fontana, Federico; Giacomini, Luca; Lodari, Renata (2015). Villa Ottolenghi Wedekind: una residenza del novecento ad Acqui Terme (in Italian). Turin: Allemandi.
- Germani, Ester (2024). "Artista, committente, progettista: Herta von Wedekind, voce narrante di Villa Ottolenghi Wedekind ad Acqui Terme, tra primo Novecento e contemporaneità". In Tamborrino, Rosa (ed.). Città che si adattano? Adaptive Cities? (in Italian). AISU International. ISBN 9788831277099.
- Haberl, Diletta (2024). "I ricami di Herta Ottolenghi Wedekind zur Horst: mezzo di liberazione da una "prigione"". Novecento Transnazionale. Letterature, Arti e Culture (in Italian) (8): 130–148. doi:10.13133/2532-1994/18641.
