= Synod of Bishops for the Pan-Amazon region =

2019 Catholic Church conference in Rome

The Synod of Bishops for the Pan-Amazon region, commonly referred to as the Amazon synod, met in Rome from 6 to 27 October 2019. Pope Francis announced on 15 October 2017 that a special assembly of the Synod of Bishops would work "to identify new paths for the evangelization of God's people in that region", specifically the indigenous peoples who are "often forgotten and without the prospect of a serene future".

The obstacles to evangelization include the difficult terrain that makes native populations hard to reach, the great variety of languages spoken, and the resistance of landowners and business interests. The Amazon basin, according to one Vatican report, covers some 6,000,000 km^{2} (2,300,000 sq mi), with a population of 2.8 million divided among 400 tribes that "speak some 240 languages belonging to 49 linguistic families". The synod defines the region to include all or parts of Bolivia, Brazil, Colombia, Ecuador, French Guiana, Guyana, Peru, Venezuela and Suriname, most of which are countries where the population is largely Roman Catholic.

== Background ==
As early as 1912, in the encyclical Lacrimabili statu, Pope Pius X denounced the owners of the rubber plantations in Peru for mistreating the native population and condemned Capuchin missionaries for failing to protect them. Pope John Paul II called similar synods for the Netherlands in 1980 and for Lebanon in 1995.

Visiting Brazil in July 2013, Pope Francis said: "The Church's presence in the Amazon Basin is not that of someone with bags packed and ready to leave after having exploited everything possible. The Church has been present in the Amazon Basin from the beginning, in her missionaries, religious congregations, priests, laity and bishops, and she is still present and critical to the area's future." Pope Francis' encyclical Laudato si' (2015) focused on the need to defend the poor and their natural environment.

Since March 2015, the Pan-Amazon Ecclesial Network (REPAM) has coordinated the work of the Catholic Church in the Amazon region, marshaling the work of priests and missionaries, national representatives of Caritas, and lay advocates to protect from exploitation both the indigenous peoples of the Amazon and the natural resources of the region. Archbishop Salvador Pineiro García-Calderón of Ayacucho, President of the Peruvian Bishops' Conference, reported that Pope Francis proposed a synod devoted to the Amazon region in a meeting with the bishops of Peru in May 2017. He mentioned it to the bishops of Ecuador in September 2017.

Francis visited Peru on 19 January 2018 and was met by 4,000 members of the indigenous communities from the Amazon rainforest. He said that the people of the Amazon were threatened now more than ever, and questioned the conservationist policies that affect the Peruvian rainforest. In Puerto Maldonado, he asked for the indigenous communities to be recognized as partners instead of as minorities. He said that "all the efforts we make in order to regain the life of the peoples of the Amazon will always be too few". He called on the Peruvian people to put an end to practices that degrade women, and criticized the sterilization of indigenous women.

On 9 August 2019, Pope Francis announced that the synod will denounce isolationism and populism, which "lead to war". The Pope also stated that "globalization and unity should not be conceived as a sphere, but as a polyhedron: each people retains its identity in unity with others". He previously noted the effects of a globalized market in the working document as well. Pope Francis announced that the ordination of married priests will "absolutely not" be one of the main topics which will be discussed at the synod and that it is "simply a number of the Instrumentum Laboris".

== Preparatory and working documents ==
A preparatory document released in June 2018 identified the key themes of the Synod as the role of women in the Church, the rights and traditions of indigenous people, and the need to provide greater access to the Eucharist. In preliminary meetings two possible innovations for the synod's consideration included the ordination of married men as priests and an examination of possible official ministries for women. The region faces a shortage of priests capable of serving remote rural populations. In January 2019 Pope Francis expressed sympathy for the ordination of married men as priests in the Pacific islands: "It's something to think about when there's a pastoral need." Since the wheat-based bread normally used for the Eucharist is ill-suited to the Amazon's humidity, the Synod may consider allowing the use of the region's yucca-based bread. In May 2019 Cardinal Cláudio Hummes put the shortage of priests in the context of inculturation. He said that the Amazon needs its own Church with "an Amazon face and also an indigenous face" rather than "a European Church transplanted in the Amazon". He asked: "How can we think of an indigenous church for the indigenous if there are no indigenous clergy?"

On 4 May 2019, Francis appointed Hummes as General Rapporteur of the synod, and named two Special Secretaries: Bishop David Martínez De Aguirre Guinea, apostolic vicar of Puerto Maldonado, Peru, and Father Michael Czerny, under-secretary of the Section for Migrants and Refugees of the Dicastery for Promoting Integral Human Development.

The synod's working document (instrumentum laboris), titled "Amazonia, new paths for the Church and for an integral ecology", was published on 17 June 2019. The key issues of the instrumentum laboris were the ordination of married men, the role for women in the Church, and environmental concerns.

The working document drew polarized reactions among Catholics. According to Cardinal Pedro Barreto Jimeno, the agenda put forward "largely expresses the feelings and desires of many representatives of the Amazon people". However, Cardinal Walter Brandmüller qualified the document as "heretical" because, in his view, it contradicted the "binding Church teaching in decisive points". Cardinal Gerhard Müller, former Prefect of the Congregation for the Doctrine of the Faith, went in the same direction, stating that the working document contained "false teaching" on God's revelation. Müller added that "no Pope, synod or council could make possible the ordination of women as bishop, priest or deacon." Cardinal Burke and Bishop Athanasius Schneider announced a campaign of 40 days of praying and fasting to ensure that "error and heresy don't pervert the imminent Synod." Cardinal Burke called the working document "a direct attack on the Lordship of Christ" and "apostasy". Venezuelan Cardinal Urosa described the instrumentum laboris as "pretty good" on ecology but suffering from "many failures" on ecclesiology and missionary issues. Cardinal Sarah, prefect of the Congregation for Divine Worship, said that he was "afraid that some Westerners will confiscate this assembly to move their projects forward [...] thinking in particular of the ordination of married men, the creation of women's ministries or giving jurisdiction to laypeople." According to Sarah, those points concern the universal Church and therefore "cannot be discussed in a particular and local synod."

Major Archbishop Sviatoslav Shevchuk, head of the Ukrainian Greek-Catholic Church, suggested that those considering married priests to overcome the shortage of priests in the Latin Church should "proceed with caution" as allowing married men to be ordained does not solve the shortage in his church, especially in the United States and Canada. He said, "Don't look for easy solutions to difficult problems."

== Final document ==
On 26 October 2019, in a vote with 128 in favor and 41 against, the synod proposed that married men who are permanent deacons be ordained as priests in the Amazon region, "in extreme situations, and with conditions".

Another proposal, in a vote with 137 in favour and 30 against, recommended continuing to study the possibility of ordaining women as deacons. But Sister Nathalie Becquart, consultor to the General Secretariat of the Synod of Bishops and in Rome for the Synod on the Amazon, observed that: "As the challenge is de-clericalization, maybe there could also be another way, ... to imagine the Church with another ministerial system, less focused on ordination." In the same line Peruvian Cardinal Pedro Barreto, speaking of women religious celebrating the para-liturgies of communion, said he explained to the people that "this is not the Eucharist," but they tell him, "we prefer the Mass of the sister, to that of the priest who comes and goes rapidly." He went on explaining that many in the synod "insisted much that it's necessary to pass from 'a pastoral [ministry] of the visit' to 'a pastoral [ministry] of presence.'" The fact is, he said, "the presence [of the church] among the most distant peoples is through the women religious."

== Reception ==
Cardinal Camillo Ruini, the former vicar general of Rome, said that ordaining married men in Amazon was the "wrong choice" and that allowing non-celibate priests would be conforming to the modern-day culture instead of the spirit of the church in serving God. Ruini also claimed that allowing married priests would be a further blow to the institution of marriage in the Catholic church. American religious and political writer George Weigel criticized the structure of Synods in the church, saying that it never represents what lay Catholics believe and described it as a masquerade for the intrusion of progressive ideologies into the Catholic church.

In November 2019, a group of 100 Catholics accused Francis of indulging in "sacrilegious and superstitious acts" during the synod where two indigenous statues of pregnant women, allegedly depictions of the fertility goddess Pachamama, were featured in a ceremony. Austrian Catholic activist Alexander Tschugguel later stole the statues from their display in Santa Maria in Traspontina and threw them into the Tiber. However, the statues were referred to as "Our Lady of the Amazon" by one of the participants in the ceremony, who gave the statue to the pope.

== Follow-up by Pope Francis ==
In February 2020 Pope Francis promulgated his follow-up apostolic exhortation "Querida Amazonia" ("Beloved Amazonia") in which he does not mention the priestly ordination of married men but pleads for "justice for the region's 33 million people for the protection of their lives, their cultures, their lands, the Amazon river and rainforests, against the 'crime and injustice' being perpetrated in the region by powerful economic interests, both national and international, that risk destroying the people and the environment." Almost half the document discusses "the need for a radical, missionary renewal of the Amazonian church that involves inculturation at all levels, including in the liturgy, church ministries and organization, and the development of 'a specific ecclesial culture that is distinctively lay', that gives a greater role for the laity, and especially for women."

== See also ==
- Dorothy Stang
- Latin American Episcopal Conference
- Synod of Bishops in the Catholic Church
- Latin American liberation theology
