= Santi Pietro e Paolo a Via Ostiense =

- Basilica of Saints Peter and Paul on the Ostian Way
- Basilica dei Santi Pietro e Paolo a Via Ostiense
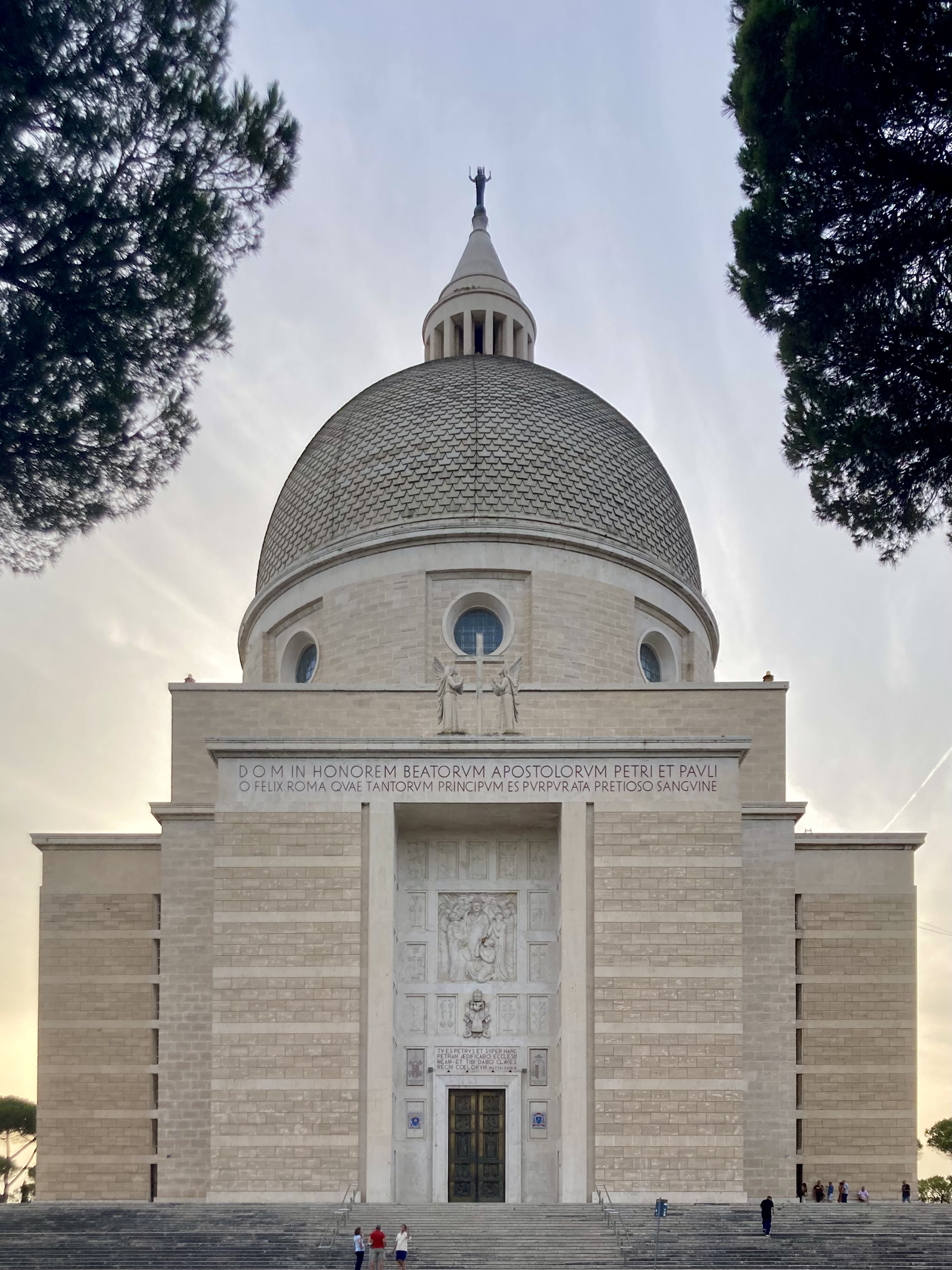
- East façade
- Click on the map for a fullscreen view
- 41.8337°N 12.4593°E
- Location: Piazzale dei Santi Pietro e Paolo 8, Rome
- Country: Italy
- Language: Italian
- Denomination: Catholic
- Tradition: Roman Rite
- Religious order: Order of Friars Minor Conventual
- Website: santipietroepaoloroma.it

History
- Status: titular church, minor basilica
- Founded: 1939
- Dedication: Saint Peter and Paul the Apostle

Architecture
- Architect: Arnaldo Foschini
- Architectural type: Simplified Neoclassicism
- Completed: 1955

Administration
- Diocese: Rome

The basilica of Santi Pietro e Paolo a Via Ostiense is one of the titular churches in Rome, to which Cardinal-Priests are appointed. It is a modern building at Piazzale dei Santi Pietro e Paolo 8 in EUR (Esposizione Universale Roma).

It is at the west end of the Viale Europa, the last two blocks of which is a monumental approach reserved for pedestrians and paved with polychrome marble.

== History ==
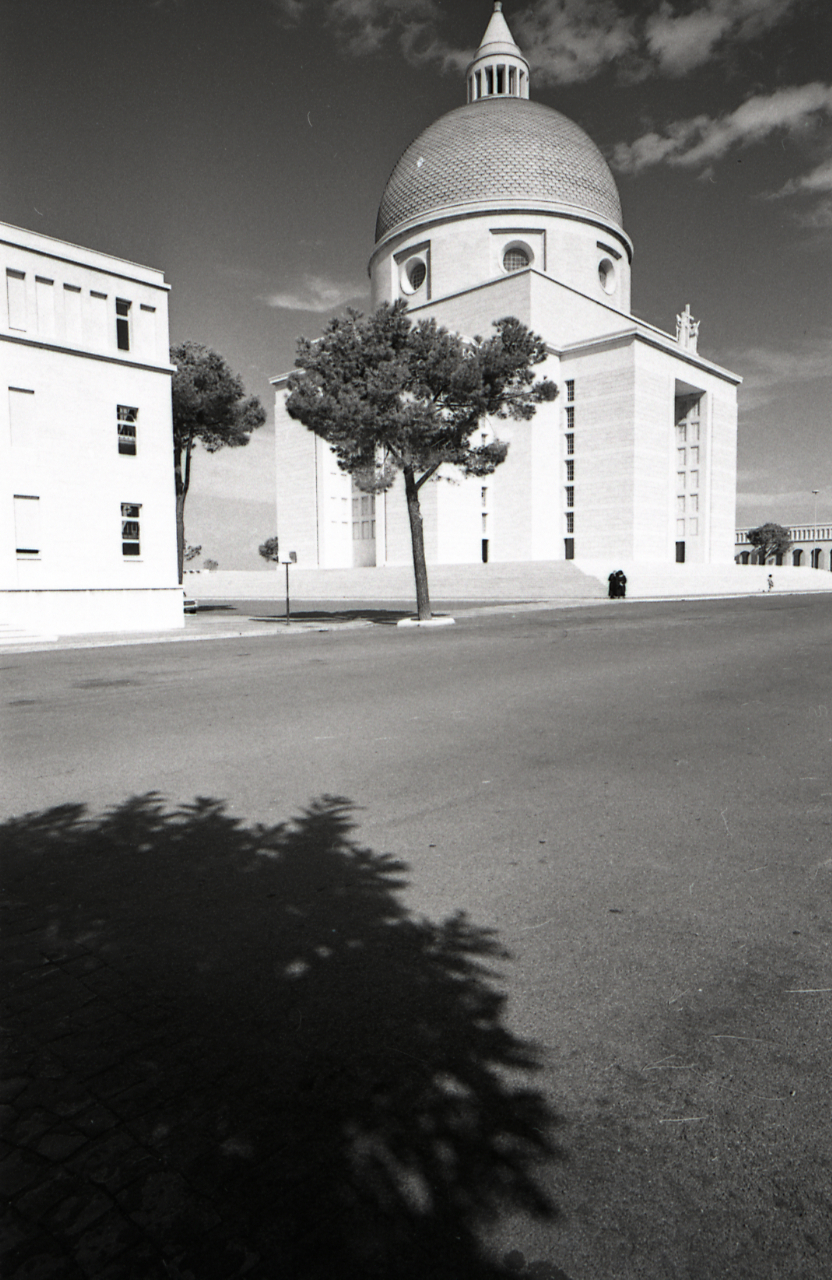
Photo by Paolo Monti, 1967

The title was established on 5 February 1965 by Pope Paul VI. The original scheme was part of the 1936 Fascist scheme for hosting the World Exhibition in 1942, which never took place because of World War II but which left a legacy of monumental buildings. The church was planned for a high point at the west end of the site, and was entrusted to a committee of architects: Arnaldo Foschini, Alfredo Energici, Vittorio Grassi, Nello Ena, Tullio Rossi and Costantino Vetriani. They chose a plan based on a Greek cross, in deliberate emulation of the original plan for the new St Peter's by Michelangelo. Construction began in 1939, but was delayed by the war and by a lack of enthusiasm on the part of the diocese. It was only completed in 1955, and became a parish church in 1958.

The parish is administered by the Franciscan Conventuals. The cardinalate title is Santi Pietro e Paolo in Via Ostiense, and the present titular is Pedro Barreto.

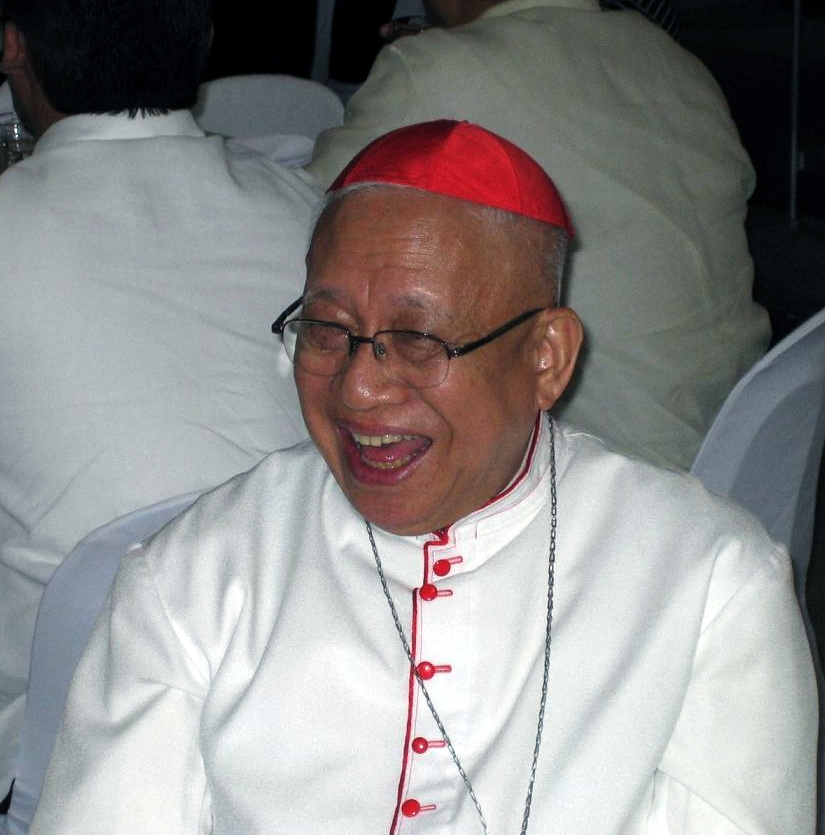
Ricardo Vidal, Cardinal-Priest from 1985 to 2017

== Exterior ==
The site is on a ridge overlooking the Tiber Valley, and sloping down to the main area of the EUR on the other side. It is in the north-west corner of the EUR. The intention of the planners was that the building should be visible from afar.

The edifice is a cube in brown brick with stone trim, and with four gigantic pylons attached to each face forming the Greek cross. These pylons are banded with six horizontal stone string courses. The hemispherical dome is covered in hexagonal tiles and sits on a drum having eight rectangular recesses containing porthole windows. The lantern is a cylinder with fourteen rectangular slits, capped with a conical finial crowned by a statue of Our Lady. The entrance is in the eastern pylon, and in the enormous rectangular recess above the doors is a relief of the resurrected Christ with the apostles. Immediately above the door is the Confession of Peter in Latin, and above the recess is a dedicatory inscription.

== Interior ==
Apart from a marble dado, all the interior surfaces are painted in a uniform light brownish yellow. The dome is coffered with a cross motif, has a stained glass window in the oculus showing a cross. There are eight round windows in the dome's drum. The interior features a large mosaic of Christ over the main altar. The left-hand side chapel is dedicated to the Immaculate Conception and contains a mosaic of the Madonna and Child, while the right-hand one is dedicated to Francis of Assisi and contains a mosaic of him and other Franciscan saints. There are reliefs depicting the Evangelists at the cardinal points. In the center of the church is a sixteen-sided light fitting suspended from the dome pendentive and matching the width of the dome.

== Holders of the title ==
The Cardinal-Priests of Ss. Pietro e Paolo a Via Ostiense have included:

- Franjo Šeper (22 February 1965 - 30 December 1981)
- Ricardo Vidal (25 May 1985 - 18 October 2017)
- Pedro Barreto (28 June 2018 - ).

== Bibliography ==
- Carlo Ceschi (1963). Le chiese di Roma: dagli inizi del neoclassico al 1961. Bologna: Cappelli.
- Associazione fra i Romani, ed. (1968). Albo d'oro dei caduti nella difesa di Roma del settembre 1943. Roma.
- Claudio Rendina (2000). Le Chiese di Roma. Roma: Newton & Compton. p. 291.
- Massimo Alemanno (2004). Le chiese di Roma Moderna. Vol. III. Roma: Armando. pp. 34–38. ISBN 978-88-6081-147-9.
- Graziano Fronzuto (2007). Organi di Roma. Guida pratica orientativa agli organi storici e moderni. Firenze: Leo S. Olschki. pp. 361–362.
- Luigi Monzo (2017). Croci e fasci - Der italienische Kirchenbau in der Zeit des Faschismus, 1919-1945 (in German). Karlsruhe. pp. 912–928. doi:10.5445/IR/1000071873.
- (DE) Monzo, Luigi: Croci e fasci - Der italienische Kirchenbau in der Zeit des Faschismus. Berlino, Monaco, 2021, pp. 505-519.
