= Marcello Canino =

Italian architect and engineer

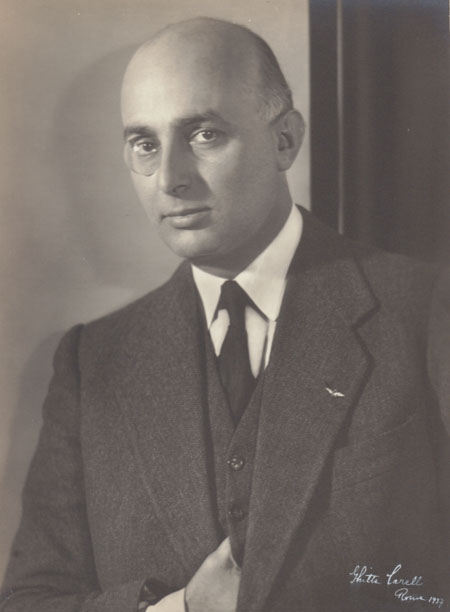
- Canino in 1937
- Born: 3 July 1895; Naples, Kingdom of Italy
- Died: 2 October 1970 (aged 75); Naples, Italy
- Occupation(s): Architect, civil engineer

Marcello Canino (3 July 1895 – 2 October 1970) was an Italian architect and civil engineer, active mainly between the 1920s and the 1940s as a representative of fascist architecture. His pre-war projects conveyed a sense of grandeur, classicism, and symmetry, reflecting the values of the regime.

== Life and career ==
Canino was influenced by Gustavo Giovannoni's studies, connecting him to the cultural movements of Rome during the 1920s and 1930s. He served as professor of Architectural Composition at the University of Naples from 1936 to 1965, and as dean of the Faculty of Architecture from 1941 to 1952.

Among his major works are villas, public buildings, monuments, and railway stations. Notable projects include the winning design for the church of Maddalena in Messina (1932), the Intendenza di Finanza Building, the INA Building, and the Bank of Italy Building in Naples (1933–1937), the monument to Aurelio Padovani in Pizzofalcone (1934), and stations such as Pompei Scavi-Villa dei Misteri, Sant'Agnello, and Castellammare di Stabia. He also participated in urban planning projects, including the layout of the Mostra d'Oltremare exhibition in Naples.

In the post-war period, Canino adapted to Italian rationalism, creating affordable housing developments such as the Gemito district and a building in Piazza del Municipio in Naples. He continued designing significant structures, including the Avellino Courthouse and the church of Santa Giuliana in Frasso Telesino.

== Sources ==
- Sepe, Giovanni (1976). Marcello Canino: un'autobiografia scritta con le "cacate". Naples: Compagnia Tipografica Napoletana.
- Sergio Stenti (ed.). Marcello Canino 1895-1970. Naples: Clean.
