= Diocese of Huánuco =

Roman Catholic diocese in Peru

Coordinates: 9.9289°S 76.2396°W

Diocese of Huánuco Dioecesis Huanucensis

Catholic
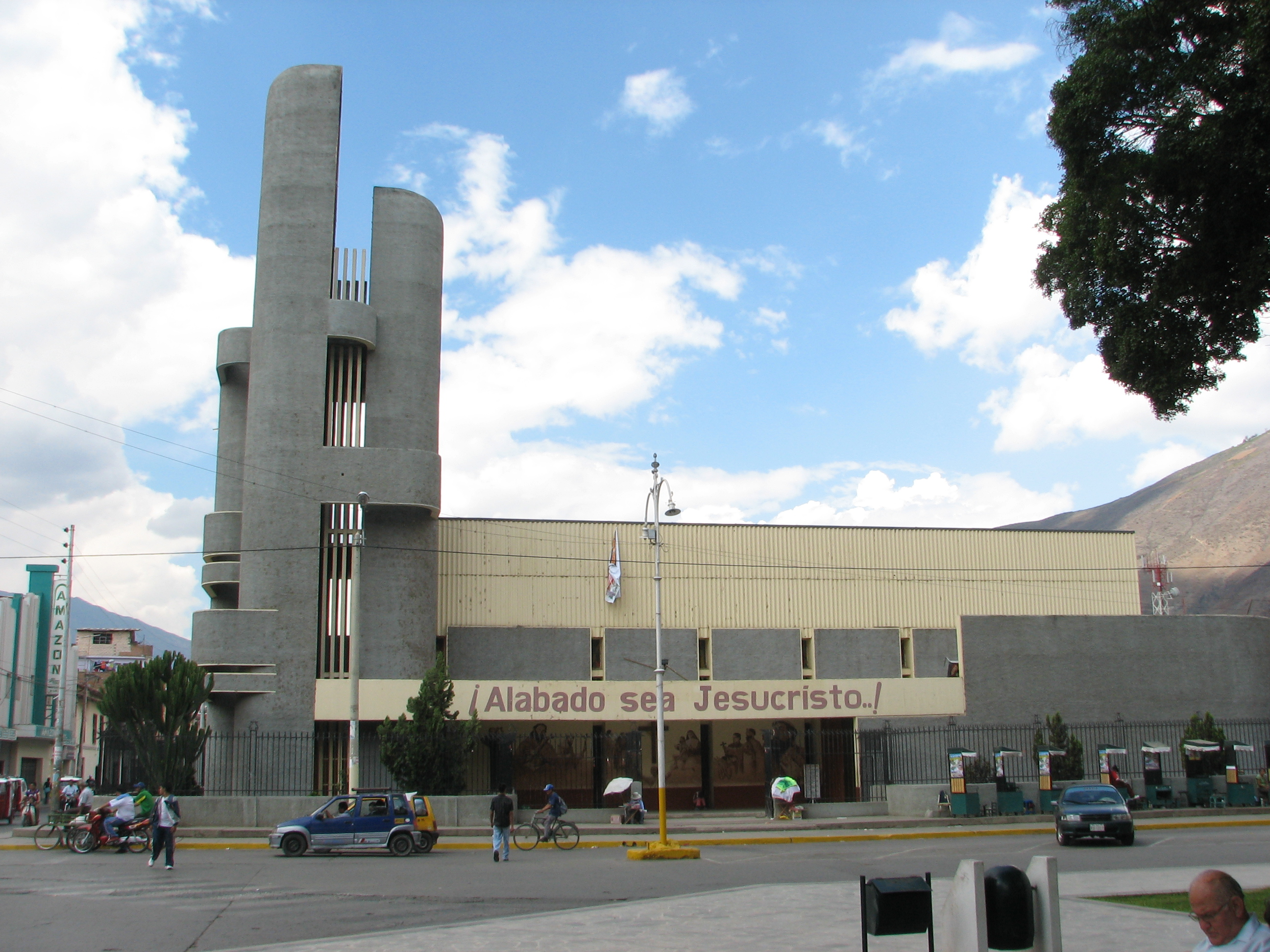
- Cathedral in Huánuco

Location
- Country: Peru
- Ecclesiastical province: Huancayo

Statistics
- Area: 44,000 km^{2} (17,000 sq mi)
- Population: Total; Catholics: (as of 2004); 822,804; 740,523 (90.0%)

Information
- Denomination: Catholic Church
- Rite: Latin Rite
- Cathedral: Catedral del Señor de Burgos

Current leadership
- Pope: Leo XIV
- Bishop: Pedro Alberto Bustamante López
- Bishops emeritus: Jaime Rodríguez Salazar, M.C.C.I.

The Roman Catholic Diocese of Huánuco is situated in Peru, is a diocese located in the city of Huánuco in the ecclesiastical province of Huancayo.

== History ==
- 17 March 1865: Established as Diocese of Huánuco from the Metropolitan Archdiocese of Lima

== Leadership ==
- Bishops of Huánuco (Roman rite), in reverse chronological order
  - Bishop Pedro Alberto Bustamante López, (2024.06.01 – Present)
  - Bishop Neri Menor Vargas, O.F.M. (2016.05.12 – 2022.04.20), appointed Bishop of Carabayllo
  - Bishop Jaime Rodríguez Salazar, M.C.C.I. (2004.12.16 – 2016.05.12), retired
  - Bishop Ermanno Artale Ciancio, S.D.B. (1994.06.21 – 2003.09.17)
  - Bishop Antonio Kühner y Kühner, M.C.C.I. (1980.07.24 – 1991.01.22)
  - Bishop Ignacio Arbulú Pineda (1959.02.06 – 1979.04.06)
  - Bishop Carlos Alberto Arce Masías (1956.12.17 – 1959.02.06), appointed Bishop of Piura
  - Bishop Teodosio Moreno Quintana (1947.06.27 – 1956.12.17), appointed Bishop of Huaraz
  - Bishop Francisco Rubén Berroa y Bernedo (1922.08.12 – 1946.11.24), appointed Bishop of Ica
  - Bishop Pedro Pablo Drinot y Piérola, SS.CC. (1904.06.08 – 1920.10.21), resigned
  - Bishop Alfonso Maria de la Cruz Sardinas, O.F.M. (1890.08.10 – 1902.06)
  - Bishop Manuel Teodoro del Valle (1865.03.27 – 1872.08.29), appointed Archbishop of Lima

== See also ==
- Roman Catholicism in Peru
