= Avellino Courthouse =

Judiciary building in Avellino, Italy

- Interactive map of the Avellino Courthouse area

General information
- Type: Courthouse
- Location: Avellino, Campania, Italy
- Coordinates: 40°54′56.3″N 14°47′10.9″E
- Completed: 1977

Design and construction
- Architect: Marcello Canino

The Avellino Courthouse (Italian: Palazzo di Giustizia di Avellino, lit. 'Palace of Justice of Avellino') is a judicial complex located on Piazza d'Armi in Avellino, Italy.

== History ==
The design phase of the new courthouse building began at the initiative of the Municipality of Avellino starting in 1962. The building was designed by architect Marcello Canino and completed in 1977.

== Description ==
The floor plan features a trapezoidal shape, with a large central courtyard and a pass-through atrium that serves the purpose of connecting two urban areas. According to Canino, the courtyard layout was "the most suitable for the building's functions", as it allows for a clear distinction between the public area and the space designated for judicial personnel, both served by the same vertical connections but at different levels.

On the first floor are the courtrooms for criminal trials, with the space covering the central part of the courtyard—specifically the area designated for the Court of Assizes. On the upper floors are the offices and civil courtrooms, arranged around a central void. The facades are rhythmically articulated with hexagonal reinforced concrete pillars that create a portico aimed at isolating the courthouse from the city. The building is finished with travertine cladding.

The building has been regarded as belonging to that "monumental concept that characterizes Canino's public architecture, with its giant portico order bringing it closer to the large structures under construction during that period".

== Sources ==
- Belfiore, Pasquale (2006). "Frammenti di qualità architettonica. Percorsi dell'età post-moderna, 1958–1995". In A. Croce; F. Tessitore; D. Conte (eds.). Napoli e la Campania nel Novecento. Diario di un secolo. Vol. 2. Naples: Liguori. p. 190.
- De Fusco, Renato (1996). "La Campania: architettura e urbanistica del Novecento". In G. Pugliese Carratelli (ed.). Storia e civiltà della Campania. Il Novecento. Naples: Electa Napoli. p. 150.
- Margherita, Daria (2005). "Edifici pubblici". In Sergio Stenti (ed.). Marcello Canino 1895–1970. Naples: Clean. pp. 202–208.
