= David Martínez De Aguirre Guinea =

Spanish catholic bishop (born 1970)

David Martínez De Aguirre Guinea OP
- Vicar Apostolic of Puerto Maldonado
- Church: Catholic Church
- See: Apostolic Vicariate of Puerto Maldonado
- Installed: 23 June 2015
- Predecessor: Francisco González Hernández
- Other post: Titular Bishop of Izirzada (since 2014)
- Previous post: Coadjutor Vicar Apostolic of Puerto Maldonado (2014-2015)

Orders
- Ordination: 11 December 1999
- Consecration: 11 October 2014 by Francisco González Hernández

Personal details
- Born: 10 January 1970 (age 56) Vittoria, Álava, Spanish State
- Coat of arms

David Martínez De Aguirre Guinea (born 10 January 1970) is a Spanish-born prelate of the Catholic Church who has served as Apostolic Vicar of Puerto Maldonado, Peru, since 2015. He has worked in Peru since 2001.

== Biography ==
David Martínez De Aguirre Guinea was born on 10 January 1970 in Vitoria-Gasteiz, Spain. After completing his early education at Marianista Santa María Ikastetxea di Vitória-Gasteiz, he attended the Higher Institute of Philosophy in Valladolid (1993-1995) and then the Faculty of Theology Saint Stephen in Salamanca (1995-1998). He earned a degree in Biblical Theology at the University of Deusto in Bilbao and studied at the Dominican École Biblique et Archéologique Française in Jerusalem (1998-2000).

On 18 September 1993, Martínez professed his final vows as a Dominican and on 11 December 1999 he was ordained to the priesthood. Over the next few years he held pastoral positions first in Bilbao and then in Cusco, Peru. and then in Puerto Maldonado where he taught Biblical Theology at the vicariate's seminary. From 2001 to 2014 he led the church and mission of Kirigueti, while serving from 2004 to 2014 as councillor of the Regional Vicariate of Saint Rose of Lima. He also led the mission of San Pedro Mártir de Timpía and was a director of the Cultural Center José Pio Aza in Lima.

On 8 July 2014, Pope Francis named him Coadjutor Bishop of the Apostolic Vicariate of Puerto Maldonado, and he succeeded to the office of Bishop on 23 June 2015 when Francis accepted the resignation of his predecessor, Bishop Francisco González Hernández. He described his mission and hopes for the 2019 Synod in 2018:

We hope that the synod will raise awareness that the Amazon region is not just a pantry to be raided for its resources, but a space to protect. We are an Amazon church, with the Amazon at its heart. We have to ensure the peoples of the Amazon have a stronger participation in the church, and that their contribution shows us the face of Christ and can enrich us.

On 4 May 2019, Francis named him one of two Special Secretaries for the October 2019 Synod of Bishops for the Pan-Amazon region.
