= Archdiocese of Huancayo =

Roman Catholic archdiocese in Peru

Coordinates: 12.0676°S 75.2098°W

Metropolitan Archdiocese of Huancayo Archidioecesis Metropolitanae Huancayensis

Catholic
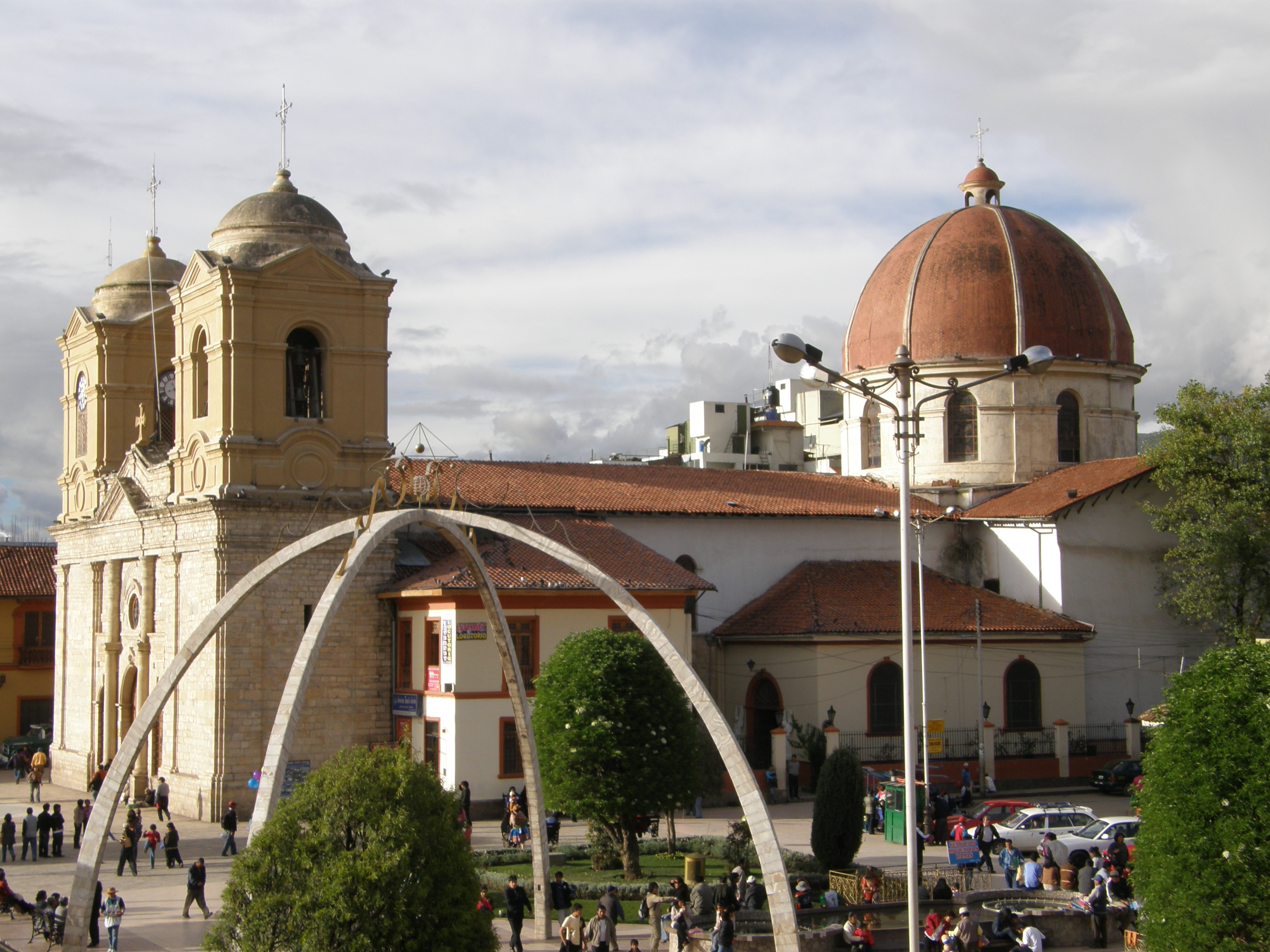
- Metropolitan Archcathedral of the Most Holy Trinity

Location
- Country: Peru

Statistics
- Area: 15,145 km^{2} (5,848 sq mi)
- Population: Total; Catholics: (as of 2004); 792,505; 728,867 (92.0%)

Information
- Rite: Latin Rite
- Cathedral: Cathedral of the Most Holy Trinity

Current leadership
- Pope: Leo XIV
- Metropolitan Archbishop: Luis Alberto Huamán Camayo
- Bishops emeritus: Pedro Barreto

Website
- Website

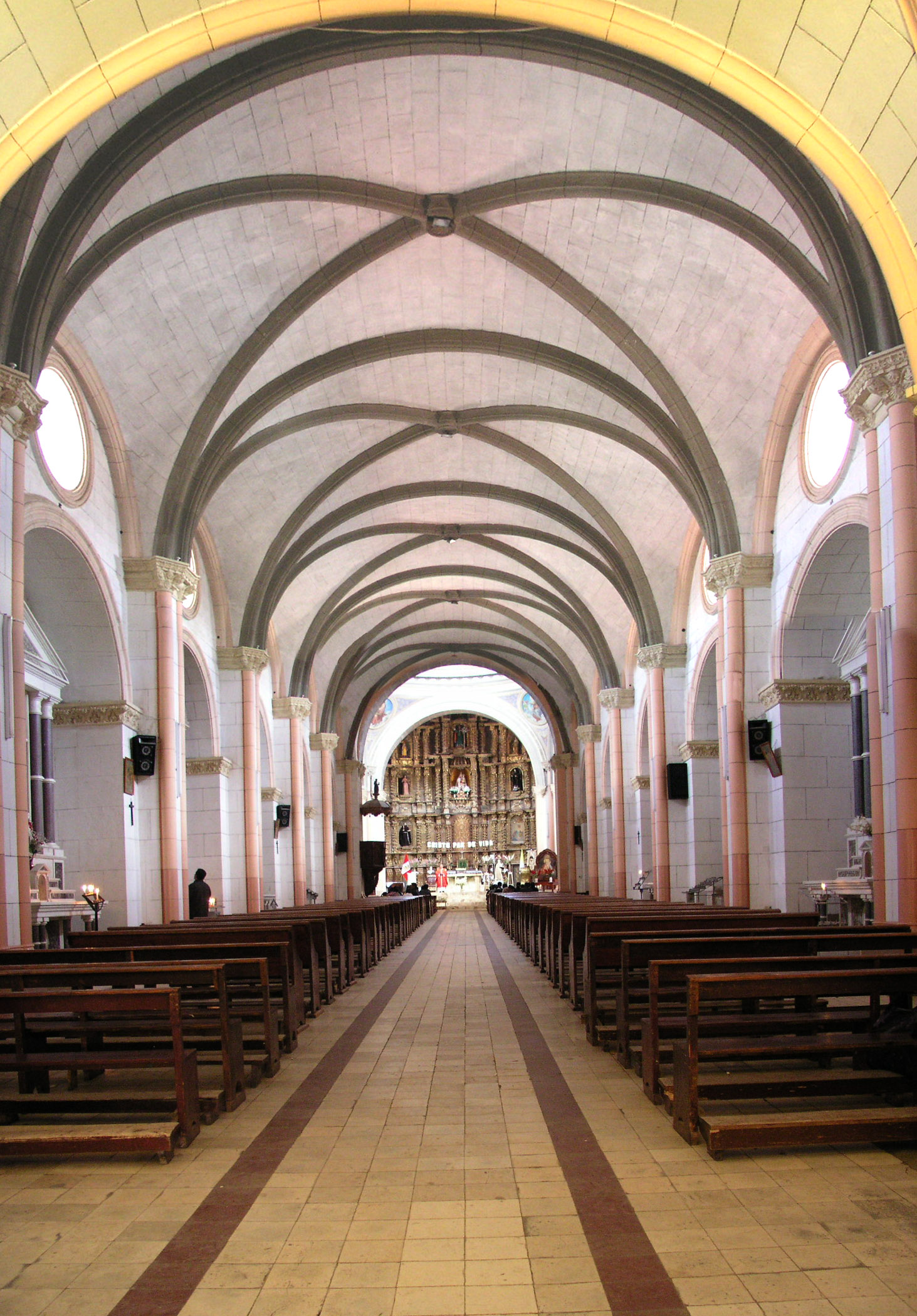
The nave of Jauja Cathedral

The Roman Catholic Metropolitan Archdiocese of Huancayo (Latin: Huancayen(sis)) is a Latin Metropolitan archdiocese in Peru's western Amazonian Junín Region.

Its cathedral episcopal see is Catedral de la Santísima Trinidad (dedicated to the Holy Trinity) in the city of Huancayo.

== History ==
- Established on 18 December 1944 as Diocese of Huancayo on territory split off from the Diocese of Huánuco
- Lost territory on 15 May 1585 to establish the Territorial Prelature of Tarma
- 30 June 1966: Promoted as Metropolitan Archdiocese of Huancayo

== Bishops ==
=== Ordinaries ===
Bishops of Huancayo

- Leonardo José Rodriguez Ballón, O.F.M. (1945–1946), appointed Archbishop of Arequipa
- Daniel Figueroa Villón (1946–1956), appointed Bishop of Chiclayo
- Mariano Jacinto Valdivia y Ortiz (1956–1966); see below

Archbishops of Huancayo

- Mariano Jacinto Valdivia y Ortiz (1966–1971); see above
- Eduardo Picher Peña (1971–1984), appointed Military Vicar and later Military Ordinary of Peru
- Emilio Vallebuona Merea, S.D.B. (1985–1991)
- José Paulino Ríos Reynoso (1995–2003), appointed Archbishop of Arequipa
- Cardinal Pedro Ricardo Barreto Jimeno, S.J. (2004–2024)
- Luis Alberto Huamán Camayo O.M.I. (2024–)

=== Auxiliary bishop ===
- Carlos Alberto Salcedo Ojeda, O.M.I. (2016–2021)

== Ecclesiastical province ==
Apart from the metropolitan archdiocese, its province comprises two suffragan dioceses

- Diocese of Huánuco
- Diocese of Tarma

== See also ==
- Roman Catholicism in Peru

== Sources and external links ==
- GCatholic.org, with incumbent biography links
- Catholic Hierarchy
- Diocese website
