= Apostolic Vicariate of Puerto Maldonado =

Latin Catholic ecclesiastical jurisdiction in Peru

Apostolic Vicariate of Puerto Maldonado Vicariatus Apostolicus Portus Maldonadi

Location
- Country: Peru
- Metropolitan: Immediately exempt to the Holy See
- Coordinates: 12°36′S 69°12′W

Statistics
- Area: 156,000 km^{2} (60,000 sq mi)
- Population: Total; Catholics: (as of 2004); 258,000; 217,000 (84.1%)

Information
- Denomination: Catholic Church
- Sui iuris church: Latin Church
- Rite: Roman Rite

Current leadership
- Bishop: David Martínez De Aguirre Guinea, O.P.
- Bishops emeritus: Francisco González Hernández, O.P. Juan José Larrañeta Olleta, O.P.

Map

The Apostolic Vicariate of Puerto Maldonado (Latin: Vicariatus Apostolicus Portus Maldonadi) is a Latin Church apostolic vicariate of the Catholic Church in Peru. Its cathedra is located in the episcopal see of Puerto Maldonado.

== History ==
- January 5, 1900: Established as Apostolic Prefecture of San Domingo de Urubamba from the Diocese of Cusco
- July 4, 1913: Promoted as Apostolic Vicariate of Urubamba y Madre de Dios
- March 10, 1949: Renamed as Apostolic Vicariate of Puerto Maldonado

== Leadership ==
=== Ordinaries, in reverse chronological order ===
- Vicar Apostolics of Puerto Maldonado, below
  - Bishop David Martínez De Aguirre Guinea, O.P. (June 23, 2015 – present)
  - Bishop Francisco González Hernández, O.P. (February 2, 2008 – June 23, 2015)
  - Bishop Juan José Larrañeta Olleta, O.P. (April 26, 1980 – February 2, 2008)
  - Bishop Javier Miguel Ariz Huarte, O.P. (May 27, 1959 – April 26, 1980, appointed Auxiliary Bishop of Lima
  - Bishop José María García Graín, O.P. (March 10, 1949 – May 27, 1959)
- Vicars Apostolic of Urubamba y Madre de Dios (Roman Rite), below
  - Bishop Enrique Alvarez González, O.P. (July 14, 1946 – June 2, 1948)
  - Bishop Sabas Sarasola Esparza, O.P. (June 13, 1923 – February 29, 1944)
  - Bishop Ramón Zubieta y Les, O.P. (July 4, 1913 – November 19, 1921)
- Prefect Apostolic of San Domingo de Urubamba (Roman Rite), below
  - Bishop Ramón Zubieta y Les, O.P. (1901 – July 4, 1913)

=== Coadjutor Vicars Apostolic ===
- Javier Miguel Ariz Huarte, O.P. (1952-1959)
- Francisco González Hernández, O.P. (2001-2008)
- David Martínez De Aguirre Guinea, O.P. (2014-2015)

=== Auxiliary bishops ===
- Ignacio Ortuzar Rojas (1968-1969), did not take effect
- Juan José Larrañeta Olleta, O.P. (1976-1980), appointed Vicar Apostolic here
