= Centre for Research and Action for Peace =

Research and education centre in Ivory Coast

- Abbreviation: CERAP
- Established: 1962; 64 years ago
- Location(s): 15 avenue Jean Mermoz Cocody; 08 bp 2088 Abidjan 08; Ivory Coast
- Official language: French
- Managing Director: Francis P. Kabore
- Director of DIHR: Ludovic Lado
- Program coordinators: Aristide Dossou; Rodrigue Naortangar
- Affiliations: Jesuit, Catholic
- Website: (in French) CERAP
- Formerly called: African Institute for Economic and Social Development (INADES)

Centre for Research and Action for Peace (CERAP) (Centre de Recherche et d'Action pour la Paix), Ivory Coast, began as the African Institute for Economic and Social Development (INADES), with its early focus on agricultural training. In 2003, INADES expanded and changed its name to CERAP.

== History ==
The CERAP was established in 1962 at the request of the Catholic bishops of West Africa to develop a center of Christian reflection on socio-economic development, with the cooperation of a similar center in France (CERAS), and with the encouragement of political leaders in the Ivory Coast including President Félix Houphouët-Boigny.

== Programs ==
On 9 May 2003, INADES changed its name to CERAP, Centre for Research and Action for Peace, and reorganized into four branches:

- CEDOC, created in 1964 under the name of IDOC, is the Documentation Centre for the social sciences.
- Social Action in Urban Areas (ASMU), created in 1985, offers apprenticeships for disadvantaged youth.
- EDICERAP, formerly INADES-Editions (1976-1992), encourages publication of newspapers and books by Ivorian authors. It also publishes the monthly Courrier Débats – West Africa.
- The Institute of Dignity and Human Rights (DIHR), created in 2003, grants diplomas and the master's degree in human rights, peace studies, economic ethics, and sustainable development, recognized by the Ivorian Ministry of Higher Education.

== See also ==
- List of Jesuit sites
