= Franjo Šeper =

Croatian cardinal (1905–1981)

His Eminence Franjo Šeper
- Cardinal Prefect of the Congregation for the Doctrine of the Faith Archbishop of Zagreb
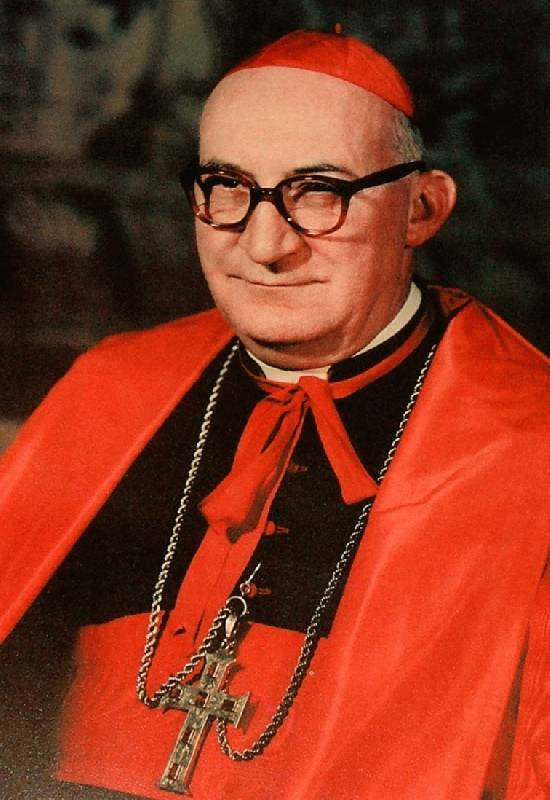
- Church: Roman Catholic
- Archdiocese: Zagreb
- Appointed: 8 January 1968
- Term ended: 25 November 1981
- Predecessor: Alojzije Stepinac
- Successor: Franjo Kuharić
- Other post: Cardinal-Priest of SS Pietro e Paolo a Via Ostiense
- Previous posts: Coadjutor Archbishop of Zagreb (1954–1960); Titular Archbishop of Philippopolis in Thracia (1954–1960)

Orders
- Ordination: 26 October 1930 by Giuseppe Palica
- Consecration: 21 September 1954 by Josip Ujčić
- Created cardinal: 22 February 1965 by Pope Paul VI
- Rank: Cardinal-Priest

Personal details
- Born: 2 October 1905 Osijek, Croatia-Slavonia, Austria-Hungary
- Died: 30 December 1981 (aged 76) Rome, Italy
- Coat of arms: Franjo Šeper's coat of arms

Franjo Šeper (2 October 1905 – 30 December 1981) was a Croatian prelate of the Catholic Church. He served as prefect of the Congregation for the Doctrine of the Faith from 1968 to 1981, and was elevated to the cardinalate in 1965. Before that, he served as the Archbishop of Zagreb from 1960 to 1969.

== Biography ==
Born in Osijek, in the Austro-Hungarian Kingdom of Croatia-Slavonia (present-day Croatia), he and his family moved to Zagreb in 1910; his father was a tailor and his mother a seamstress. He started his seminary studies in Zagreb then at the Pontifical Gregorian University) in Rome. He was ordained to the priesthood by Archbishop Giuseppe Palica on 26 October 1930.

His first pastoral assignments were in the Archdiocese of Zagreb and, in 1934, was appointed private secretary to the Archbishop. In 1941, father Šeper became the rector of the archdiocesan seminary, a post which he held for the next decade. On 22 July 1954 he was named Coadjutor Archbishop of Zagreb and Titular Archbishop of Philippopolis; he received his episcopal consecration on the following 21 September from Archbishop Josip Ujčić of Belgrade.

He succeeded Cardinal Aloysius Stepinac as Archbishop of Zagreb on 5 March 1960, and was created Cardinal-Priest of Ss. Pietro e Paolo a Via Ostiense by Pope Paul VI in the consistory of 22 February 1965.

=== Prefect of the Congregation of the Doctrine of the Faith ===
He was named Prefect of the Congregation for the Doctrine of the Faith (CDF) on 8 January 1968. Šeper was also the President of the International Theological Commission from its inception in April 1969, and the author of the 1973 document Mysterium Ecclesiae, which was written in order to re-orient the ecclesiology of the post-Vatican II period.

After the first meeting held on 11 April 1969 in the convent of the Divine Master in Ariccia, in the Vatican he supervised the development of work on the ecumenical dialogue between the Church and Freemasonry.

In 1974, the Congregation published a Declaration on procured abortion, re-asserting the Church's opposition to the procedure since the publication of Humanae Vitae. It later published the document Persona Humana on the topic of sexual ethics.

In 1976, he was responsible for writing the statement Inter Insigniores, which firmly rejected the ordination of women in the Catholic Church. Inter Insigniores does not apply to the question of ordaining women as deacons in the Catholic Churches. In 1980, he also wrote the CDF's Declaration on Euthanasia, explaining the Church's view on ending life.

Šeper was a cardinal elector in the August and October conclaves of 1978.

Cardinal Šeper said Freemasonry appeared to be less active in plotting against the Church because it had achieved most of its agenda, “Today perhaps it does not plot as much because they have already plotted enough and have nothing left to plot for, everything that has happened in Italy at this time regarding civil marriage, divorce, abortion, and other matters are Masonic fruits, and not only in Italy but also in other nations.”

== Death and legacy ==
Pope John Paul II accepted Šeper's resignation as Prefect on 25 November 1981. He died on 30 December in Gemelli Hospital, where he had been hospitalized for a month. John Paul presided at his funeral Mass, and Šeper's body was later transferred to Zagreb, where it is buried beside the tomb of Cardinal Stepinac.

Jakov Sedlar directed a documentary Šeper, vjera u vremenu promjena ('Šeper, faith in times of change'), which premiered in the November of 2026.

Catholic Church titles
Preceded by Alojzije Stepinac	Archbishop of Zagreb; 1960–1969	Succeeded by Franjo Kuharić
Preceded by Alfredo Ottaviani	Prefect of the Congregation for the Doctrine of the Faith; 1968–1981	Succeeded by Joseph Ratzinger
Preceded by Titular Church Created	Cardinal-Priest of Ss. Pietro e Paolo a Via Ostiense; 1965–1981	Succeeded by Ricardo Vidal
