= Nathalie Becquart =

Catholic religious sister

Sister Nathalie Becquart XMCJ
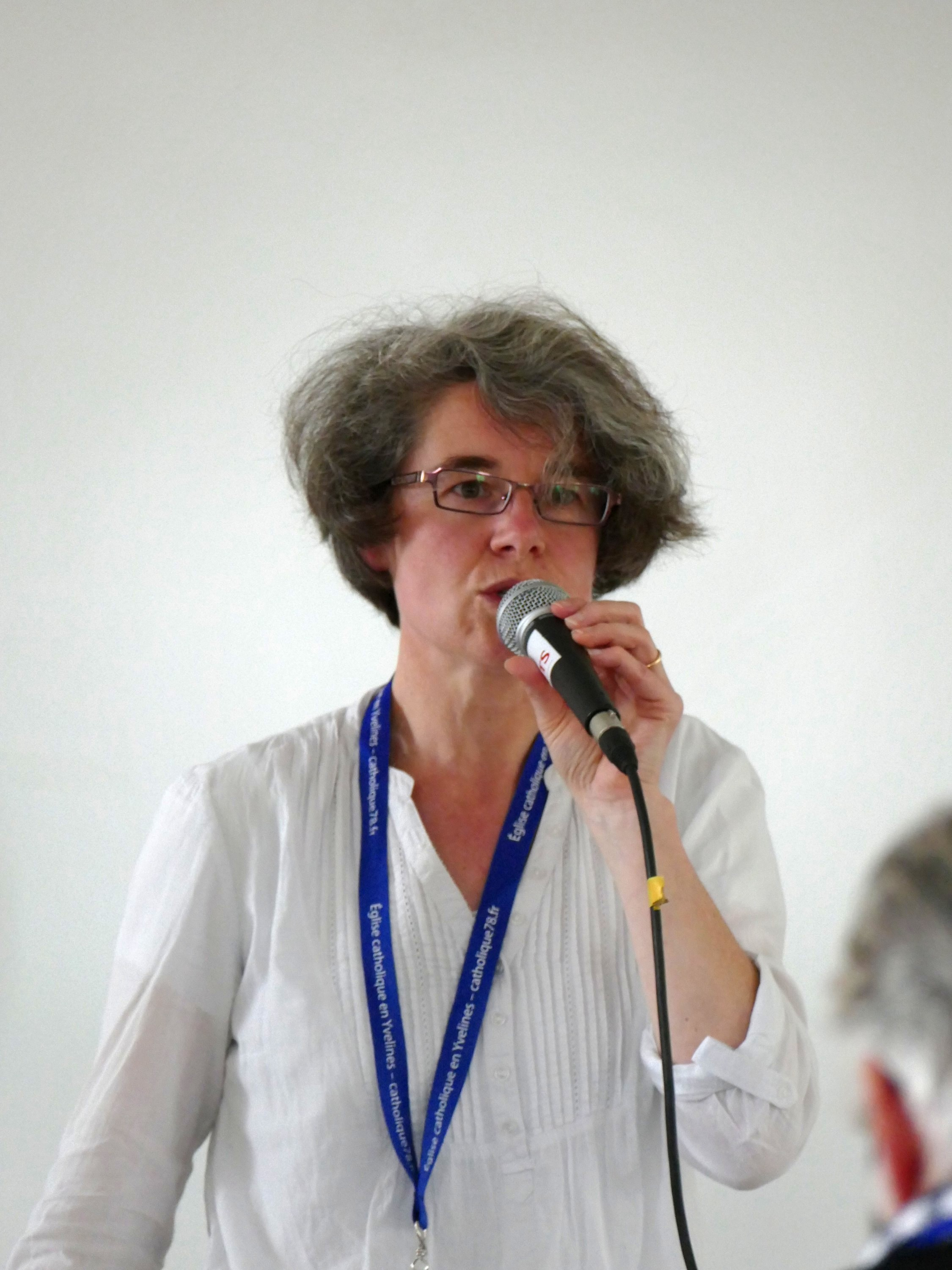
- In Versailles, 2015

Personal life
- Born: 1969 (age 56–57)
- Education: HEC Paris, Boston College
- Known for: Among first women consultors to a Holy See general secretariat

Religious life
- Religion: Catholic
- Institute: Congregation of Xavières

Senior posting
- Present post: Undersecretary of the Synod of Bishops
- Previous post: Director of French Catholic National Service for the Evangelization of Young People and for Vocations
- Awards: BBC 100 Women (2022)

Nathalie Becquart, XMCJ (born 1969) is a French Catholic religious sister. She served as an undersecretary of the Synod of Bishops from 2021 to 2026. She is the first woman to hold such a position and the first to have voting rights in the Synod. She is a member of the Congregation of Xavières.

Becquart was appointed a consultor to the Synod of Bishops in 2019 and named one of its undersecretaries in 2021. From 2008 to 2018, she oversaw the National Service for the Evangelization of Young People and for Vocations (SNEJV) within the Bishops' Conference of France.

== Early life and education ==
Nathalie Becquart was born in Fontainebleau in 1969. She graduated from HEC Paris in 1992, with a major in entrepreneurship. She volunteered in Lebanon for a year and then worked for two years as a consultant in marketing-communication.

== Religious life ==
In 1995 she joined the Congregation of Xavières. After a postulancy in Marseille and two years of novitiate, she went on mission for three years to the national team of Scouts de France, in charge of the Plein Vent program (scouting in working-class neighborhoods). She studied theology and philosophy at the Centre Sèvres (the Jesuit seminary in Paris) as well as sociology at the School for Advanced Studies in the Social Sciences.

=== Youth ministry ===
As soon as she joined the Xavières, Becquart began supporting young people within the Ignatian Youth Network (now known as the Magis Network). She was president of the association "Life at sea, entry into prayer" which offers young people spiritual retreats on sailboats and animates many cruise-retreats as skippers or spiritual guides. In her youth she had enjoyed vacations at sea. In 2006, she became responsible for the chaplaincy of students in Créteil.

In 2008, the Conference of Bishops of France appointed her deputy director of student pastoral care, and in 2012 director of the national service for the evangelization of young people and for vocations.

This led to her involvement in the preparation for the synod of bishops on "Young People, Faith, and Vocational Discernment", both in France and in Rome where she was appointed general coordinator of the pre-synod of young people in March 2018 and auditor for this Fifteenth Ordinary General Assembly of the Synod of Bishops on young people in October 2018.

=== Synod of Bishops ===
On 24 May 2019, she was appointed, along with four other women and one man, as consultor to the general secretariat of the Synod of Bishops in the Catholic Church. It is the first time for women to be appointed to that position. She saw the appointment as a part of Pope Francis's effort "to implement synodality at every level of the Church’s life" and to benefit from the important contribution that women can make. Becquart proposed a symbolic step of asking a woman to lead the retreat for the Roman Curia one year.

On 6 February 2021, Pope Francis appointed her an undersecretary of the Synod of Bishops, making her the first woman to have the right to vote in the Catholic Synod of Bishops. She stepped down in 2026 after serving her five-year term, and was succeeded in the role by Sister Elena Massimi, FMA.

=== Later career ===
On 17 November 2026, she gave the homily at the inauguration service of the 12th General Synod of the Church of England at Westminster Abbey.

== Bibliography ==
She is the author of several books:

- 100 prayers to weather the storm, Paris, Salvator, coll. "100 prayers", October 2012 (ISBN 978-2706709593);
- The evangelization of young people, a challenge, Paris, Salvator. May 2013 (ISBN 978-2706710209);
- Religious, why? Paris, Salvator, March 2017, 144 p. (ISBN 978-2706714801);
- The spirit renews everything, Paris, Salvator, February 2020.
