= Pedro Barreto =

Peruvian prelate

His Eminence Pedro Barreto S.J.
- Cardinal, Archbishop Emeritus of Huancayo
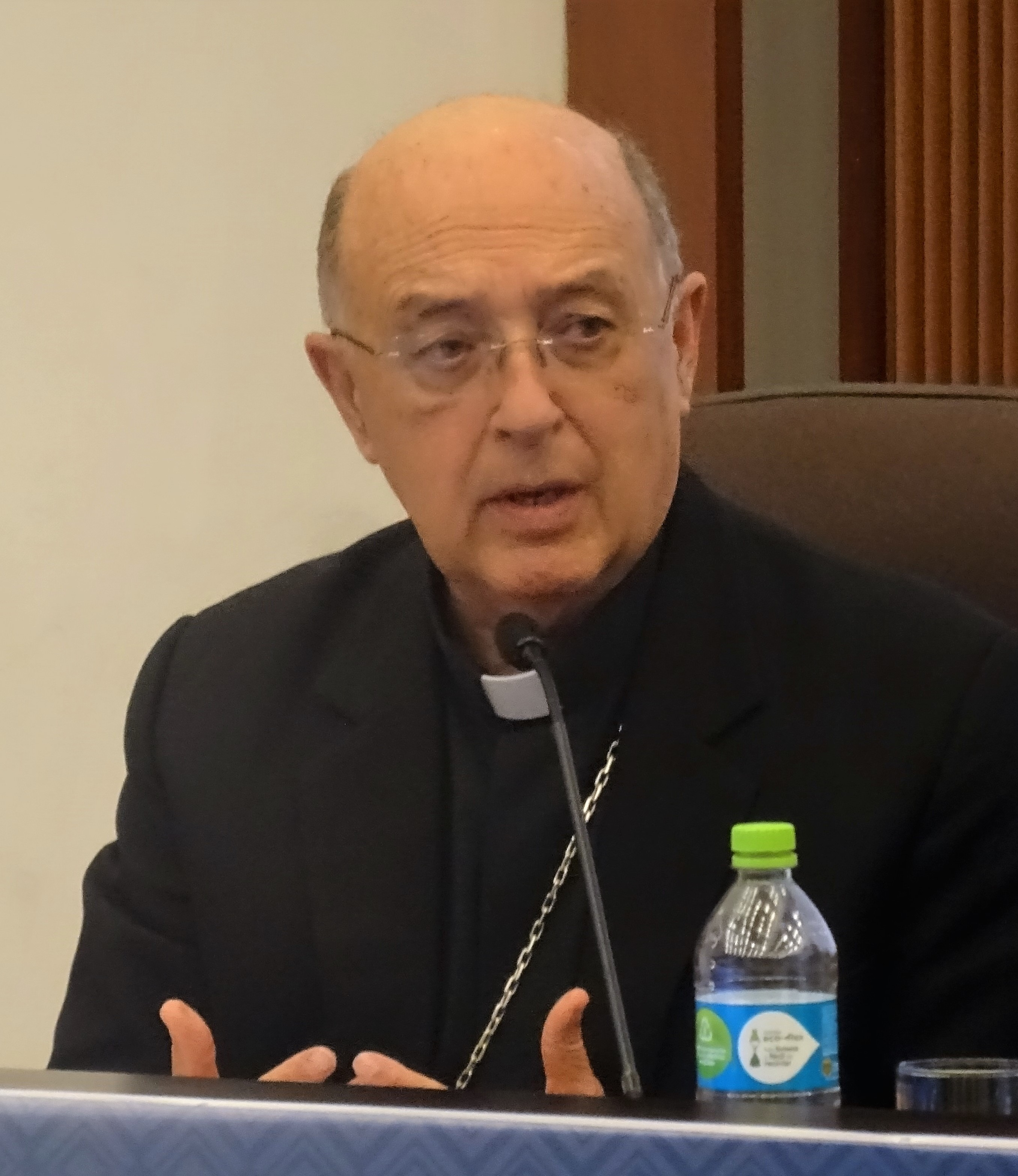
- Barreto in mid-2018.
- Church: Roman Catholic Church
- Archdiocese: Huancayo
- See: Huancayo
- Appointed: 17 July 2004
- Installed: 5 September 2004
- Retired: 12 February 2024
- Predecessor: José Paulino Ríos Reynoso
- Successor: Luis Alberto Huamán Camayo
- Other posts: Vice-President of the Peruvian Episcopal Conference (2012–); Cardinal-Priest of Santi Pietro e Paolo a Via Ostiense (2018–)
- Previous posts: Vicar Apostolic of Jaén en Peru (2001–04); Titular Bishop of Acufida (2001–04); Apostolic Administrator of Jaén en Peru (2004–05)

Orders
- Ordination: 18 December 1971
- Consecration: 1 January 2002 by José María Izuzquiza Herranz
- Created cardinal: 28 June 2018 by Pope Francis
- Rank: Cardinal-Priest

Personal details
- Born: Pedro Ricardo Barreto Jimeno; 12 February 1944 (age 82) Lima, Peru
- Motto: En todo amar y servir
- Coat of arms

Pedro Ricardo Barreto Jimeno SJ (Spanish pronunciation: [ˈpe.ðɾo βaˈre.to]; born 12 February 1944) is a Peruvian prelate of the Catholic Church who was Archbishop of Huancayo from 2004 to 2024. He has been a cardinal since 2018.

== Biography ==
Barreto was born in Lima, Peru, on 12 February 1944 and entered the Jesuit novitiate there. He studied philosophy at the Jesuit faculty in Alcalá de Henares, Spain, and theology in Lima. He was ordained a priest of the Society of Jesus on 18 December 1971 and took his final vows as a Jesuit on 3 October 1976.

On 21 November 2001, Pope John Paul II named him titular bishop of Acufida and Apostolic Administrator of Jaén in Peru. He was consecrated a bishop on 1 January 2002.

On 17 July 2004, John Paul appointed him Archbishop of Huancayo and he was installed there on 5 September.

He has headed the Justice and Peace Section of the Latin American Bishops' Conference (CELAM). He has fought the mining industry over its environmental impact on La Oroya. He has been vice president of the Pan-Amazonian Ecclesial Network (REPAM) and was a member of the organizing committee for the Pan-Amazon Synod of Bishops.

On 29 September 2012, Pope Benedict XVI made him a member of the Pontifical Council for Justice and Peace. Pope Francis made Barreto a Cardinal-Priest in the consistory of 28 June 2018, assigning him the titular church of Santi Pietro e Paolo a Via Ostiense.

In 2019 at the Synod of Bishops he said that those who oppose Pope Francis “want a static church, a church of doctrine, more than one of pastoral action. They want a church that is different to the one Jesus wants, which is a church of solidarity, a church that really responds to the needs of people, and of nature itself.”

Pope Francis accepted his resignation as archbishop of Huancayo on 12 February 2024, which was his 80th birthday.

== See also ==
- Cardinals created by Francis
- Catholic Church in Peru

Catholic Church titles
Preceded by Louis Phạm Văn Nẫm	Titular Bishop of Acufida; 21 November 2001 – 17 July 2004	Succeeded by Vincent Barwa
Preceded by José María Izuzquiza Herranz	Vicar Apostolic of Jaén en Peru; 21 November 2001 – 17 July 2004	Succeeded by Santiago María García de la Rasilla Domínguez
Preceded by José Paulino Ríos Reynoso	Archbishop of Huancayo; 17 July 2004 – 12 February 2024	Succeeded by Luis Alberto Huamán Camayo
Preceded by Ricardo Vidal	Cardinal-Priest of Santi Pietro e Paolo a Via Ostiense; 28 June 2018 – present	Incumbent
