= Ponta Negra, Manaus =

Ponta Negra
- Neighbourhood
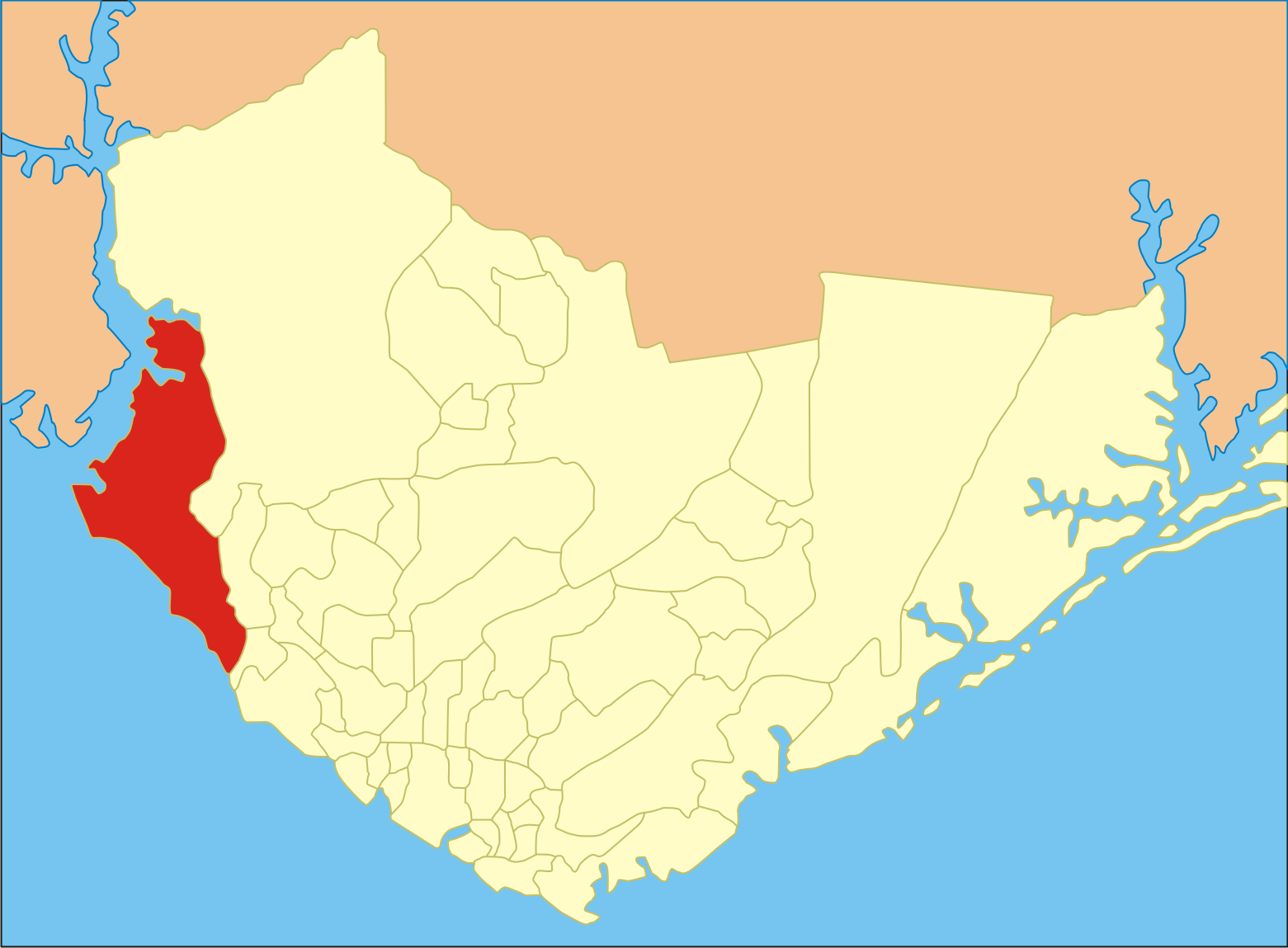
- Location of Ponta Negra neighbourhood in Manaus
- Interactive map of Ponta Negra
- Coordinates: 3.0482142°S 60.08955639°W
- Country: Brazil
- Region: North
- State: Amazonas
- Municipality: Manaus
- Administrative Zone: West Zone
- HDI: 0.930 –very high

Ponta Negra is an upper class neighborhood in the West Zone of Manaus, Amazonas.

During festivals and New Year Celebrations, this area is closed for cars, except for locals who live there or tourists staying at the hotel located in this area.
