= Arnaldo Foschini =

Italian architect (1884–1968)

- Born: 26 September 1884; Rome, Kingdom of Italy
- Died: 24 March 1968 (aged 83); Rome, Italy
- Education: Accademia di Belle Arti di Roma
- Occupations: Architect, academic

Arnaldo Foschini (26 September 1884 – 24 March 1968) was an Italian architect, professor and urban planner. Born in Rome, he studied architecture at the Accademia di Belle Arti di Roma and became professor of architectural composition at the Sapienza University of Rome. Active mainly in his native city, Foschini designed several public and religious buildings, including the Supercinema (1921–1927), buildings of the University City (1932–1935), the Palazzo della Farnesina (1937–1959), and the church of Santi Pietro e Paolo at EUR (1937–1941).

After World War II, Foschini played an important role in Italian housing policy as president of the INA-Casa management board from 1949 to 1963, contributing to the organization of post-war social housing. He also served as president of the Accademia di San Luca (1951–1952) and of the National Council of Architects (1952–1954).
