= Pontifical Academy of Martyrs =

The Pontifical Academy of Martyrs or Pontifical Academy Cultorum Martyrum (Pontificia Academia Cultorum Martyrum) is one of the ten Pontifical Academies established by the Holy See. Its purpose is to advance the cult of saints and martyrs and the study of related early Christian history, including the catacombs. It operates with guidance and support from the Congregation for Divine Worship and the Discipline of the Sacraments and other offices of the Roman Curia.

== History ==
The Academy was established on 2 February 1879 under the title "Collegium Cultorum Martyrum" by four distinguished scholars of sacred antiquity: Mariano Armellini, Adolfo Hytreck, Orazio Marucchi, and Enrico Stevenson.

In 1995, Pope John Paul II accorded it the title "Pontifical" and assigned it, as the Pontifical Academy Cultorum Martyrum, a place among the other Pontifical Academies.

With Pope Francis' reorganization of the Roman Curia as of 5 June 2022 as provided for in the apostolic constitution Praedicate evangelium, the new Dicastery for Culture and Education became responsible for coordinating the work of this Academy with its own work and that of a number of other bodies.

== Activities ==
The Academy has as its aims the promotion of the cult of the holy martyrs as well as the furthering of studies that shed light on the saints, especially on their example as "witnesses of the Faith".

This involves a particular interest for the monuments to these saints from the first centuries of Christianity, including the underground catacombs in and around Rome. In particular, the Academy organises and promotes liturgical celebrations in the ancient Christian cemeteries, both the catacombs and other sacred places, as well as lectures and study events concerned with Christian archaeology. To this end it works closely with the Pontifical Academy of Archaeology, as also with the Pontifical Institute for Christian Archaeology and, as and when appropriate, with the Pontifical Commission for Sacred Archaeology.

The Academy holds at least two general meetings each year, at the church of Santa Maria della Pietà in Camposanto dei Teutonici (accessible through the Vatican City State but technically not part it but part of the extraterritorial property of the Holy See) and at the premises of the Pontifical Institute for Christian Archaeology.

During Lent, the Academy supports the religious celebration at the station days station churches according to the traditions which combine fasting with processions to certain Roman churches, a practice revived by Carlo Respighi, who was the Academy's magister from 1931 to 1947.

== Organization and Membership ==
The Academy's administrator is the "magister", whose appointment is made by the Pope for a 5-year term (which is renewable). As foreseen by the Academy's governing regulations, the magister cooperates with those other pontifical academies and other bodies that have coinciding interests.

On 16 September 2022, Pope Francis appointed as magister the scholar Dr Raffaella Giuliani, previously a member who had held the post of "arcarius" (treasurer).

The Academy's membership is open to both men and women and includes the "Sodales", or members, and the "Associates". On reaching the age of 80, a "sodalis" becomes a "sodalis emeritus". A "sodalis" appointed a bishop is thereafter entitled a "Patron".

== See also ==
- Index of Vatican City-related articles
- Roman Academies
