= Carlo Maria Polvani =

Italian priest and diplomat (born 1965)

The Most Reverend Carlo Maria Polvani
- Titular Archbishop of Regie
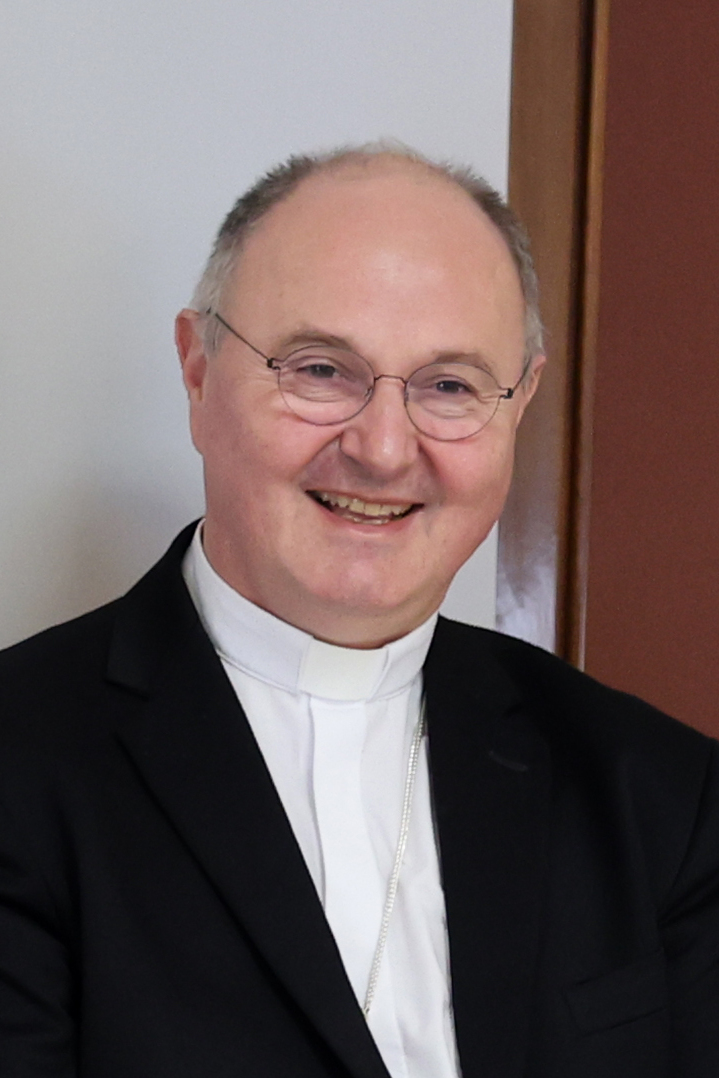
- Polvani in 2026
- Church: Catholic
- Appointed: January 12, 2025

Orders
- Ordination: February 14, 1998 by Carlo Maria Martini, S.J.

Personal details
- Born: Carlo Maria Polvani; July 28, 1965 (age 61) Milan, Italy
- Coat of arms

Ordination history
History
Priestly ordination
- Ordained by: Carlo Maria Martini, S.J.

Styles of Carlo Maria Polvani
- Reference style: His Excellency; The Most Reverend
- Spoken style: Your Excellency
- Religious style: Archbishop

Carlo Maria Polvani (born 28 July 1965) is a Roman Catholic prelate and Secretary at the Dicastery for Culture and Education. Before this he worked in the Section for General Affairs of the Secretariate of State and the Pontifical Council for Culture. On January 12, 2025, he was appointed as the titular archbishop of Regie.

== Education ==
Polvani was born in Milan. He was educated in the Leo XIII Institute and then in the Collège Stanislas, where he earned a Baccalauréat Français Section Scientifique avec mention in 1982.

He enrolled in McGill University, Canada in the Department of Biochemistry and received in 1985, a Bachelor of Science with honours and in 1990 a Doctor of Philosophy Dean's Honour List, for his research on the enzymatic mechanism of the sodium potassium ATPase.

His uncle Carlo Maria Viganò is an Italian Catholic bishop, who later will serve as secretary-general of the Governorate of Vatican City State and as Apostolic Nuncio to the United States and will be charged for becoming a traditionalist Catholic and excommunicated for schism.

He decided to become a priest, and took a degree of Master of Divinity with distinction, in 1993, at the Weston School of Theology in Cambridge, Massachusetts, USA.

He received from the Pontifical Gregorian University in Rome, a Licentiate (summa cum laude) in Canon Law (JCL) in 1995 and a Specialization summa cum laude in Jurisprudence and Forensic Psychology in 1996.

He was admitted to the Pontifical Lombard Seminary in Rome, and was ordained a priest for the Archdiocese of Milan by Cardinal Carlo Maria Martini on 14 February 1998.

He completed his Doctorate in Canon Law summa cum laude in 1999 from the Pontifical Gregorian University with the examination of a distinctively canonical activity: the authentic interpretation of laws.

== Career ==
Polvani was summoned to the Pontifical Ecclesiastical Academy in Rome, and was called to the Diplomatic Service of the Holy See, on 1 July 1999, to serve as Secretary in the Apostolic Nunciature in México. He was then called to the Secretariat of State, and in 2007 was put in charge of the Information and Documentation Office in the Section for General Affairs, as well as being the Representative of the Holy See in the Government Advisory Committee of the Internet Corporation for Assigned Names and Numbers (ICANN).

He was a witness during the trial of Claudio Sciarpelletti, computer specialist at the Secretariat of State in the Vatileaks scandal. Polvani is Archbishop Carlo Maria Viganò's nephew. He was appointed Prelate of Honour of His Holiness in 2013.

In July 2014 he was appointed a member of the Committee for the reform for the Vatican Media, with members Chris Patten (president), Msgr. Lucio Adrián Ruiz, Msgr. Paul Tighe, Fr. Giacomo Ghisani, Fr. Eric Salobir OP, Prof. Giovanni Maria Vian, Gregory Erlandson, George Yeo, Daniela Frank and Leticia Soberon.

The committee was appointed to propose reforms for the Vatican Media. The committee is to publish a report and a reform plan within 12 months after considering the report of the Pontifical Commission for Reference on the Organisation of the Economic-Administrative Structure of the Holy See. The objectives are to adapt the Holy See media to changing trends, enhance coordination, and make substantial financial savings. Following initiatives such as the Pope App and Pope Francis's Twitter account, digital channels will be set up for the Pope's messages to reach the faithful around the world, especially young people.

He worked in the Section for General Affairs until the 26 July 2019 when he was appointed adjunct under-secretary at the Pontifical Council for Culture.
