= Antonio Ferrua =

Antonio Ferrua (31 March 1901 - 25 May 2003) was an Italian Roman Catholic priest, archaeologist and epigraphist.

== Life ==
Born in Trinità, he was ordained a Jesuit priest in 1930 and three years later graduated from the University of Turin in classical letters with a thesis on epigrams of Pope Damasus I. He graduated against from the Pontifical Institute for Christian Archaeology in Christian epigraphy in 1937 and was summoned to work on Saint Peter's tomb in the Vatican necropolis by Pope Pius XII in 1940 - the resulting dispute with Margherita Guarducci over the rediscovery of Saint Peter's bones lasted the rest of Ferrua's life.

He was professor and rector of the Pontifical Institute for Christian Archaeology, secretary of the Pontifical Commission for Sacred Archaeology and librarian of the Biblioteca Apostolica Vaticana, as well as a member of the Pontifical Roman Academy of Archaeology, the Roman Society of National History, the National Institute of Roman Studies, the German Archaeological Institute and other scholarly societies. He wrote for La Civiltà Cattolica and produced a large number of his own publications, such as his work on Giovanni Battista de Rossi's nine-volume “Inscriptiones christianae Urbis Romae septimo saeculo antiquiores” (Christian inscriptions of the City of Rome from before the seventh century). He died in Rome.
