= Pontifical Institute for Christian Archaeology =

Italian research institute

Coordinates: 41°53′51.9″N 12°30′0″E

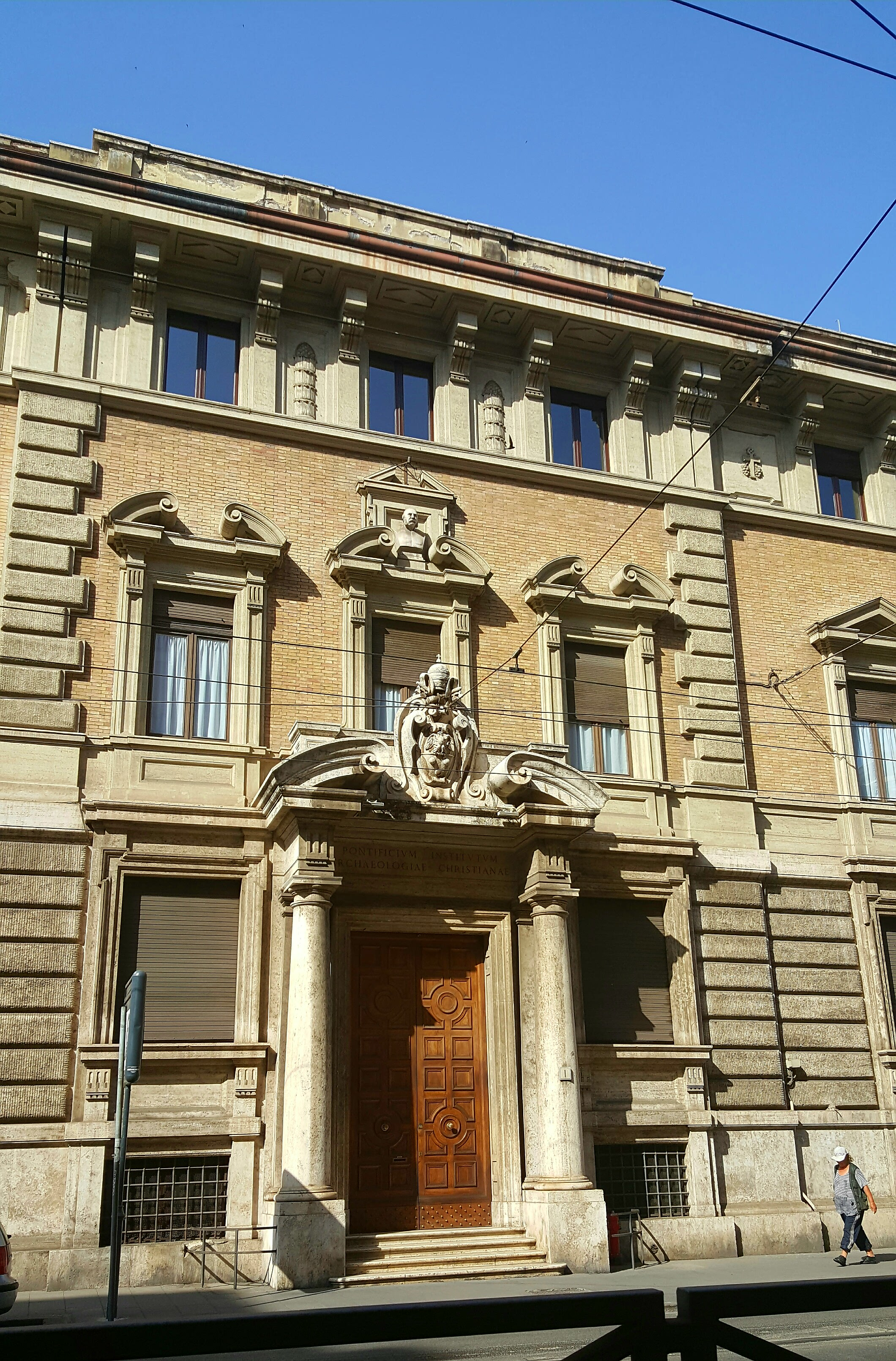
The Institute

The Pontifical Institute for Christian Archaeology (Italian: Pontificio Istituto di Archeologia Cristiana or PIAC) is an institute for the study of Christian archaeology, based in Rome. It offers a postgraduate course in Christian archaeology, which includes topography, the history of Christian archaeology, iconography, hagiography, epigraphy, architecture and other topics. The admission requirement is a completed first degree, whilst the degrees it awards are licentiate and doctorate.

It was founded on 11 December 1925 through Pope Pius XI's papal Motu proprio I primitivi cemeteri, in parallel with the Pontifical Academy of Archaeology and the Pontifical Commission for Sacred Archaeology. The same pope moved them into their present building in 1927. Its first professors were Johann Peter Kirsch, Joseph Wilpert, Henri Quentin, Angelo Silvagni and Enrico Josi. Since 2022 its Grand Chancellor has been José Tolentino Kardinal Calaça de Mendonça, Prefect of the Dicastery for Culture and Education.

It and the Pontifical Commission for Sacred Archaeology edit the Rivista di Archeologia Cristiana (Review of Christian Archaeology). The institute also publishes titles of its own. It has led excavations in Riva Ligure since 2016 and in Adulis (Eritrea) since 2018. The PIAC's professors form the Permanent Standing Committee of the International Congress for Christian Archaeology.

== Rectors ==
- Johann Peter Kirsch (1925–1941)
- Pio Franchi de’Cavalieri (1941–1942, provisional)
- Giuseppe Bruno (1942–1946, provisional)
- Lucien de Bruyne (1946–1961)
- Joseph Darsy (1961–1967)
- Enrico Josi (1967–1970)
- Victor Saxer (1970–1973)
- Antonio Ferrua (1973–1979)
- Umberto Maria Fasola (1979–1982)
- Victor Saxer (1982–1992)
- Patrick Saint-Roch (1992–1998)
- Philippe Pergola (1998–2004)
- Danilo Mazzoleni (2004–2007)
- Vincenzo Fiocchi Nicolai (2007–2013)
- Danilo Mazzoleni (2013–2020)
- Stefan Heid (2020–present)

== Bibliography ==
- (in French) Robert Jacquard (ed.): L’Institut Pontifical d’Archéologie Chrétienne. 'Journal de cinquante années (1925–1975). Rom 1975.
- (in Italian) Philippe Pergola: Il Pontificio Istituto di Archeologia Cristiana. In: Paolo Vian (ed.): Speculum Mundi. Roma centro internazionale di ricerche umanistiche. Rom 1993, S. 445–467.
- (in Italian) Olof Brandt: Il ceremoniere, l’epigrafista e la fondazione del Pontificio Istituto di Archeologia Cristiana. In: Rivista di Archeologia Cristiana. Bd. 83, 2007, S. 193–221.
- (in German) Stefan Heid, Martin Dennert (ed.): Personenlexikon zur Christlichen Archäologie. Forscher und Persönlichkeiten vom 16. bis zum 21. Jahrhundert. 2 volumes. Schnell & Steiner, Regensburg 2012, ISBN 978-3-7954-2620-0.
- (in Italian) Chiara Cecalupo, Stefan Heid (ed.): Cento anni del Pontificio Istituto di Archeologia Cristiana. Discipline e docenti, Città del Vaticano 2023.
