= Roman Curia =

Administrative institutions of the Holy See

The Roman Curia (Latin: Curia Romana, lit. '[Royal] Court of Rome') comprises the administrative institutions of the Holy See. It is sometimes incorrectly referred to as the Vatican Curia. (Note: The Holy See is often referred to as "the Vatican", a word of many meanings, since it can refer to the geographical area, known by that name even before Christianity, to the residence of the pope, to the Holy See, and to the Vatican City State, which was created in 1929.)

The Roman Curia is the central body through which the affairs of the Catholic Church are conducted. The Roman Curia is the institution of which the Roman Pontiff ordinarily makes use in the exercise of his supreme pastoral office and universal mission in the world: thus curialism refers traditionally to an emphasis on the supreme authority of the Holy See within the Catholic Church. It is at the service of the Pope and bishops, fulfilling their function with an evangelical spirit, working for the good and at the service of communion, unity and edification of the Universal Church and attending to the demands of the world in which the Church is called to fulfill its duty and mission (Praedicate evangelium, article 1).

The structure and organization of responsibilities within the Curia are at present regulated by the apostolic constitution Praedicate evangelium issued by Pope Francis on 19 March 2022, which entered into force on 5 June 2022. It was previously regulated by Pastor bonus, issued by Pope John Paul II on 28 June 1988. With the coming into force of Praedicate evangelium, Pastor bonus was fully abrogated and replaced.

Other bodies that play an administrative or consulting role in ecclesial affairs are sometimes mistakenly identified with the Curia, such as the Synod of Bishops and regional conferences of bishops. Cardinal Gerhard Müller, prefect emeritus of the Congregation for the Doctrine of the Faith, wrote in 2015 that "the Synod of Bishops is not a part of the Roman Curia in the strict sense: it is the expression of the collegiality of bishops in communion with the Pope and under his direction. The Roman Curia instead aids the Pope in the exercise of his primacy over all the churches."

== Historical background ==
The Curia was created by Pope Urban II (r. 1088–1099). The Roman Curia (Latin: Curia Romana, lit. '[Royal] Court of Rome') comprises the administrative institutions of the Holy See.

Curia in medieval and later Latin usage means "court" in the sense of "royal court" rather than "court of law". The Roman Curia is sometimes anglicized as the Court of Rome, as in the 1534 Act of Parliament (Ecclesiastical Licences Act 1533 s. III) that forbade appeals to it from England. It is the papal court and assists the Pope in carrying out his functions. The Roman Curia can be loosely compared to cabinets in governments of countries with a Western form of governance, but the only sections that can be directly compared with specific ministries of a civil government are the Second Section of the Secretariat of State, known also as the Section for Relations with States, the Pontifical Commission for Vatican City State (established in 1939 by Pius XII), and the Congregation for Catholic Education.

It is normal for every Latin Catholic diocese to have its own curia for its administration. For the Diocese of Rome, these functions are not handled by the Roman Curia, but by the Vicariate General of His Holiness for the City of Rome, as provided by the apostolic constitution Ecclesia in Urbe. The pope has, going back to St. Peter, been the bishop of Rome. There are also the Vicar General of Rome, traditionally a cardinal, and his deputy, the vicegerent, who holds the personal title of archbishop, who supervise the governance of the diocese by reference to the Pope himself, but with no more dependence on the Roman Curia, as such, than other Catholic dioceses throughout the world. A distinct office, the Vicar General for Vatican City, administers the portion of the Diocese of Rome in Vatican City.

Until recently, there still existed hereditary officers of the Roman Curia, holding titles denominating functions that had ceased to be a reality when the Papal States were lost to the papacy. A reorganization, ordered by Pope Pius X, was incorporated into the 1917 Code of Canon Law. Further steps toward reorganization were begun by Pope Paul VI in the 1960s. Among the goals of this curial reform were the modernization of procedures and the internationalization of the curial staff. These reforms are reflected in the 1983 Code of Canon Law. The offices of the Vatican City State are not part of the Roman Curia, which is composed only of offices of the Holy See. As of 2020, the Curia comprises the offices listed in the sections below. Most members of the Curia except, among some others, the Cardinal Camerlengo and the Major Penitentiary resign their office immediately after a papal death or resignation. See sede vacante.

== Structure ==
The Roman Curia is composed of the Secretariat of State, the dicasteries, and the bodies, all of which are juridically equal. By the term "curial institutions" is meant the units of the Roman Curia. The offices of the Roman Curia are the Prefecture of the Papal Household, the Office for the Liturgical Celebrations of the Supreme Pontiff and the Camerlengo of Holy Roman Church (Praedicate evangelium, Article 12).

In general, each curial institution is composed of a prefect or equivalent, a suitable number of Members, one or more Secretaries who assist the prefect, together with, but in a subordinate line, one or more under-secretaries, who are flanked by various Officials and Consultors (Praedicate evangelium, Article 13 § 1).

The members of the curial institutions are appointed from among the Cardinals residing both in and outside Rome, to whom are added, in as much as they are particularly expert in the matters in question, some bishops, especially diocesan/eparchial ones, as well as, according to the nature of the dicastery, some priests and deacons, some members of institutes of consecrated life and societies of apostolic life and some lay faithful (Praedicate evangelium, Article 15).

The prefect, or his equivalent, the members, the secretary, the undersecretary and the other major officials assigned to heads of office, equivalents and experts, as well as the consultors, are appointed by the Roman Pontiff for five-year terms. As a rule, after five years, clerical officials and members of institutes of consecrated life and societies of apostolic life who have served in curial institutions and offices return to pastoral care in their diocese or parish or in the institutes or societies to which they belong. Should the superiors of the Roman Curia deem it opportune, the service may be extended for another period of five years (Praedicate evangelium, Article 17).

Despite this general structure, some curial institutions have a different structure either due to a special law made for the curial institution or because of the nature of the curial institution (Praedicate evangelium, Article 13 § 2). Some examples of curial institutions with a special structure are the Apostolic Penitentiary (Praedicate evangelium, Article 190) and the Tribunal of the Roman Rota (Praedicate evangelium, Article 201).

In the event of the Apostolic See becoming vacant, all the heads of curial institutions and members cease to hold office. Exceptions to this rule include the Major Penitentiary, who continues to carry out the ordinary business within his competence, proposing to the College of Cardinals those matters that he would report to the Roman Pontiff; and the almoner of His Holiness, who continues in the exercise of works of charity according to the same criteria used during the pontificate, remaining in the employ of the College of Cardinals until the election of the new Roman Pontiff. During the vacancy of the Apostolic See, the secretaries are responsible for the ordinary government of curial institutions, taking care only of matters of ordinary administration. Within three months of the election of the Roman Pontiff, they are to be confirmed in their office by him. The Master of Papal Liturgical Celebrations assumes the duties provided for in the norms concerning the vacancy of the Apostolic See and the election of the Roman Pontiff (Praedicate evangelium, Article 18).

== General Regulations ==
The first General Regulations of the Roman Curia was issued in 1992, as per the art. 37 of the constitution Pastor bonus. It was then revised in 1999.

A new version, ad experimentum for the next 5 years, of these regulations is in place since 2026 to implement the changes brought about by Praedicate evangelium. In this version, the regulations were split into two: the General Regulations of the Roman Curia and the General Regulations of the personnel of the Roman Curia. The General Regulations of the Roman Curia pertains to "the Institutions and Offices that make up the Roman Curia, namely the Secretariat of State, the Dicasteries, the Judicial Bodies, and the Economic Bodies", while the General Regulations of the personnel pertains to "the norms of an organizational, disciplinary, and economic character pertaining to the employment relationship of personnel serving in the Secretariat of State, the Dicasteries, the Bodies and Offices that constitute the Roman Curia, as well as the Institutions connected with the Holy See".

== Secretariat ==
=== Secretariat of State ===
The Secretariat of State is the oldest dicastery in the Roman Curia. As the Papal Secretariat, it closely assists the Roman Pontiff in the exercise of his supreme mission. It comprises three sections: the Section for General Affairs, under the direction of the Substitute, with the assistance of the Assessor; the Section for Relations with States and International Organizations, under the direction of its secretary, with the assistance of the undersecretary and an undersecretary for the multilateral sector; and the Section for the Diplomatic Staff of the Holy See, under the direction of the secretary for papal representations, with the assistance of an undersecretary. The current secretary of the state is Pietro Cardinal Parolin.

==== Section for General Affairs ====
The Section for General Affairs is responsible for dealing with the following matters concerning the daily service of the Roman Pontiff: to examine those matters outside the ordinary competence of the curial institutions and other bodies of the Apostolic See; and to foster coordination among these dicasteries and other bodies and offices without prejudice to their autonomy. It is responsible for carrying out everything that concerns the Representatives of States of the Holy See. The current Substitute for General Affairs is Archbishop Paolo Rudelli.

==== Section for Relations with States and International Organizations ====
The task of the Section for Relations with States and International Organizations is to attend to the affairs that must be dealt with through the respective civil authorities. It is responsible for the following: to handle the diplomatic and political relations of the Holy See with states and with other subjects of international law; to deal with common affairs for the promotion of the good of the church and of civil society, also through the stipulation of concordats and other international agreements, taking into account the opinion of the episcopal bodies concerned; to represent the Holy See at international intergovernmental organizations, as well as at multilateral intergovernmental conferences, availing itself, if necessary, of the collaboration of the competent dicasteries and bodies of the Roman Curia; and to grant the nulla osta whenever a dicastery or body of the Roman Curia intends to publish a statement or document pertaining to international relations or relations with civil authorities. The current Secretary for Relations with States is Archbishop Paul Richard Gallagher.

==== Section for Diplomatic Staff of the Holy See ====
The Section for the Diplomatic Staff of the Holy See deals with matters pertaining to persons serving in the diplomatic service of the Holy See, in particular their living and working conditions and their ongoing formation. In carrying out his duties, the secretary visits the offices of the pontifical representations, and convokes and presides over meetings concerning their provisions. This section collaborates with the president of the Pontifical Ecclesiastical Academy with regard to the selection and training of candidates for the diplomatic service of the Holy See and maintains contact with retired diplomatic personnel. The current Secretary for Pontifical Representations is Archbishop Jan Romeo Pawłowski.

===== Central Statistics Office of the Church =====
The Central Statistics Office, which operates under the Vatican Secretariat of State, conducts a variety of studies for the Roman Curia throughout the year. One of the office's biggest projects is compiling the 500-page Statistical Yearbook of the Church. The yearbook tracks the Catholic population, both by a head count of the baptized in each country and as a percentage of the world's population. The current person-in-charge is Monsignor Tomislav Ɖukez.

== Dicasteries ==
Under the new constitution, all the Vatican's main departments are now known as "dicasteries". Alongside removing the title "congregation" from Vatican departments, the new constitution renames pontifical councils as "dicasteries". The constitution says: "The Roman Curia is composed of the Secretariat of State, the dicasteries and other bodies, all juridically equal to each other". The curial institutions are now made up of 16 dicasteries. Each dicastery is headed by a prefect, and supported by secretary and under-secretary.

=== Dicastery for Evangelization ===
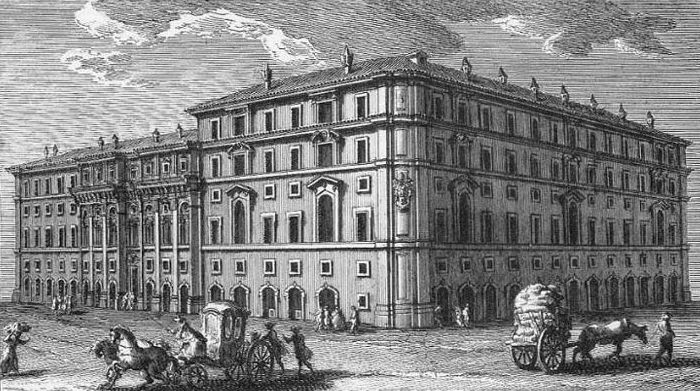
The headquarters of the Propaganda fide in Rome with north facade on Piazza di Spagna by architect Bernini; seen here is the southwest facade by Borromini: etching by Giuseppe Vasi, 1761

The Dicastery for Evangelization is competent for the fundamental questions of evangelization in the world and for the establishment, accompaniment and support of the new particular churches, without prejudice to the competence of the Dicastery for the Eastern Churches.

This new dicastery is a merger of the Congregation for the Evangelization of Peoples and the Pontifical Council for Promoting the New Evangelization. It is made up of two sections: one for fundamental questions of evangelization in the world, and one for first evangelization and the new particular churches in the territories within its competence. It is presided over directly by the Roman Pontiff, currently Leo XIV. Each of the two sections is governed in his name and by his authority by a pro-prefect.

==== Section for Fundamental Issues in World Evangelization ====
It is the task of this section to study, in collaboration with the particular churches, episcopal conferences and eastern hierarchical structures, institutes of consecrated life and societies of apostolic life, the fundamental questions of evangelization and the development of an effective announcing the Gospel by identifying appropriate forms, instruments and language. The section gathers the most significant experiences in the field of evangelization, making them available to the entire church. It encourages reflection on the history of evangelization and mission, especially in their relationship to the political, social, and cultural events that have marked and conditioned the preaching of the Gospel. The current pro-prefect is Archbishop Salvatore (Rino) Fisichella.

==== Section for First Evangelization and the New Particular Churches ====
This section supports the proclamation of the Gospel and the deepening of the life of faith in the territories of first evangelization and deals with everything that concerns the erection of ecclesiastical circumscriptions or their modifications, as well as their provisioning, and it carries out the other tasks in the same way as the Dicastery for Bishops does within the scope of its competence. The section, according to the principle of just autonomy, supports the new particular churches in the work of first evangelization and growth, collaborating with the particular churches, episcopal conferences, institutes of consecrated life, societies of apostolic life, associations, ecclesial movements, new communities, and ecclesial assistance agencies. To this section are entrusted the pontifical missionary societies – the Pontifical Society for the Propagation of the Faith, the Pontifical Society of St. Peter the Apostle, the Pontifical Society of the Missionary Childhood, and the Pontifical Missionary Union – as instruments for the promotion of the missionary responsibility of every baptized person and for the support of the new particular churches. The current pro-prefect is Luis Antonio Cardinal Gokim Tagle.

==== Associated organization ====
===== International Council for Catechesis =====
The International Council for Catechesis (COINCAT) was established by Pope Paul VI on 7 June 1973, as a consultative body within the Congregation for the Clergy. The general purpose of COINCAT, as explained in the Annuario Pontificio, is "to study the more important catechetical themes for the service of the Apostolic See and the episcopal conferences and to present proposals and suggestions." Specifically, it investigates concrete themes and important catechetical problems for the universal church, suggesting solutions and proposals for pastoral action; it provides information on the necessity of catechesis and new approaches being taken in various parts of the world; and it facilitates the exchange of catechetical experiences between the Holy See and the diverse areas in the church and among the members themselves. The current president is Archbishop Salvatore (Rino) Fisichella.

=== Dicastery for the Doctrine of the Faith ===
The Dicastery for the Doctrine of the Faith, previously known as the Congregation for the Doctrine of the Faith and as the Supreme Sacred Congregation of the Roman and Universal Inquisition, is the oldest of the dicasteries of the Roman Curia. The task of the Dicastery is to assist in the proclamation of the Gospel globally, promoting and protecting the integrity of Catholic doctrine on faith and morals, drawing on the deposit of faith and also seeking an ever deeper understanding of it in the face of new questions. The dicastery is made up of two sections – the Doctrinal Section and the Disciplinary Section – each coordinated by a secretary who assists the prefect in the specific area of his competence. The current prefect is Víctor Manuel Cardinal Fernández.

==== Doctrinal Section ====
The Doctrinal Section fosters and supports study and reflection on the understanding of faith and morals and the development of theology in different cultures, in the light of sound doctrine and the challenges of the times, so as to offer answers, in the light of faith, to the questions and arguments that emerge with the progress of the sciences and the evolution of civilizations.

==== Disciplinary Section ====
The Disciplinary Section, through the Disciplinary Office, deals with crimes reserved to the dicastery and dealt with by it through the jurisdiction of the Supreme Apostolic Tribunal therein established, proceeding to declare or impose canonical penalties in accordance with the norms of law, whether common or proper, without prejudice to the competence of the Apostolic Penitentiary.

==== Associated organizations ====
===== Pontifical Commission for the Protection of Minors =====
The Pontifical Commission for the Protection of Minors is established within the Dicastery for the Doctrine of the Faith. Its task is to provide the Pope with advice and to propose the most appropriate initiatives for the protection of minors and vulnerable persons and promote local responsibility in the particular churches for the protection of all minors and vulnerable adults. Since July 2025 the current president has been Archbishop Thibault Verny.

===== International Theological Commission =====
The International Theological Commission (ITC) is a body of the Roman Curia that advises the Magisterium in examining doctrinal questions of major importance, particularly the Dicastery for the Doctrine of the Faith. The president of the commission is the ex officio prefect of the dicastery.

===== Pontifical Biblical Commission =====
The Pontifical Biblical Commission is a consultative body, placed at the service of the Magisterium and linked to the dicastery, to ensure the proper interpretation and defense of the Bible. The president of the commission is the ex officio prefect of the dicastery.

===== College for the review of appeals by clergy accused of delicta reservata =====
The college for the review of appeals by clergy accused of delicta reservata is a commission under the jurisdiction of the dicastery composed of bishops tasked to review sexual abuse cases of minors committed by clerics. The current president is Archbishop Charles Scicluna.

=== Dicastery for the Service of Charity ===
The Dicastery for the Service of Charity, also called the Apostolic Alms Office, is a special expression of mercy and, starting from the option for the poor, the vulnerable and the excluded, it exercises in any part of the world the work of assistance and help towards them in the name of the Roman Pontiff, who in cases of particular indigence or other need, personally arranges the aid to be allocated.

The dicastery, under the guidance of the prefect, the almoner of His Holiness, in contact with other competent dicasteries, makes concrete, through its activity, the solicitude and closeness of the Roman Pontiff, as pastor of the Universal Church, towards those who live in situations of indigence, marginalization or poverty, as well as on the occasion of serious calamities.

Formerly the Office of Papal Charities, the change gives the office "a more significant role in the Curia". The current prefect is the almoner of His Holiness, Luis Marín de San Martín, OSA.

=== Dicastery for the Eastern Churches ===
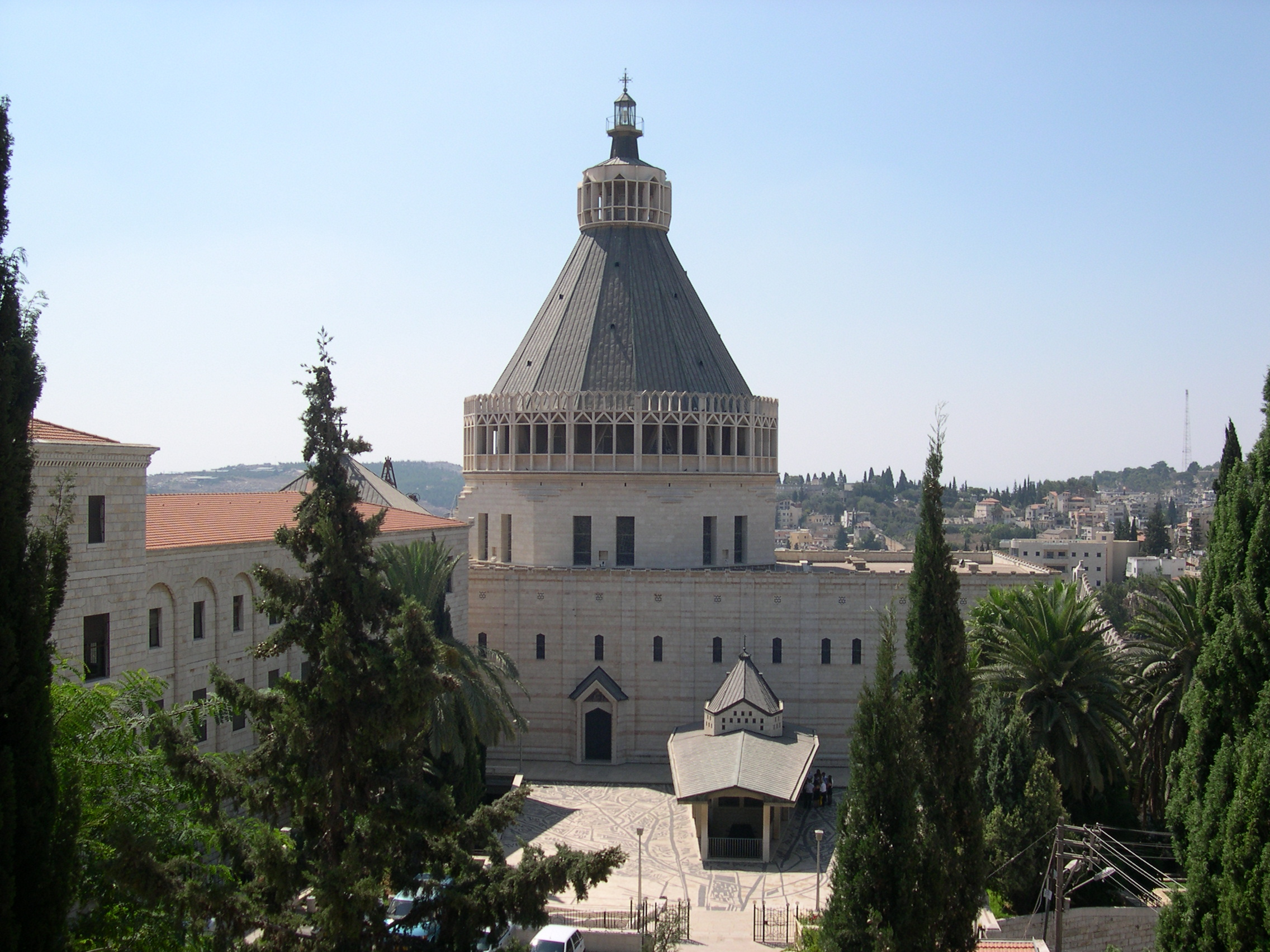
The Basilica of the Annunciation is the largest Christian church building in the Middle East under the supervision of the Congregation for the Oriental Churches.

The Dicastery for the Eastern Churches is responsible for contact with the Eastern Catholic Churches for the sake of assisting their development, protecting their rights and maintaining the one Catholic Church, alongside the liturgical, disciplinary and spiritual patrimony of the Latin Church, the heritage of the various Oriental Christian traditions. It has exclusive authority over the following regions: Egypt and the Sinai Peninsula, Eritrea and northern Ethiopia, southern Albania and Bulgaria, Cyprus, Greece, Israel, Iran, Iraq, Lebanon, Palestine, Syria, Jordan, Turkey, and Ukraine. Its members include all Eastern Catholic patriarchs and major archbishops, as well as the prefect of the Dicastery for Promoting Christian Unity. The current prefect is Claudio Gugerotti.

=== Dicastery for Divine Worship and the Discipline of the Sacraments ===
The Dicastery for Divine Worship and the Discipline of the Sacraments promotes the sacred liturgy according to the renewal undertaken by the Second Vatican Council. The spheres of its competence concern all that which by provision of law pertains to the Apostolic See concerning the regulation and promotion of the sacred liturgy and the vigilance that the laws of the church and the liturgical norms are everywhere faithfully observed. It is the task of the dicastery to provide for the editing or revision and updating of typical editions of liturgical books.

The dicastery confirms the translations of liturgical books into current languages and grants recognitio to their appropriate adaptations to local cultures, legitimately approved by the cocal bishops' conferences. It also grants recognitio to the particular calendars, the proprieties of Masses and of the Liturgy of the Hours of the particular churches and of institutes of consecrated life and societies of apostolic life approved by the relevant competent authority. It is concerned with the regulation and discipline of the sacred liturgy with regard to the extraordinary form of the Roman Rite and for the protection of the sacred relics, the confirmation of the patrons and the granting of the title of minor basilica. The current prefect is Arthur Cardinal Roche.

==== Associated organization ====
===== "Vox Clara" Committee =====
The "Vox Clara" Committee has been established to assist and advise the Dicastery for Divine Worship and the Discipline of the Sacraments in fulfilling its responsibilities with regard to the English translations of liturgical texts. Representing the different continents, the committee reflects the international character of the English language. This makes available to the Holy See the great wealth of pastoral experience drawn from different cultures. The presidency is currently vacant.

=== Dicastery for the Causes of Saints ===
The Dicastery for the Causes of Saints oversees the process that leads to the canonization of saints, passing through the steps of a declaration of "heroic virtues" and beatification. After preparing a case, including the approval of miracles, the case is presented to the pope, who decides whether or not to proceed with beatification or canonization. The dicastery establishes the canonical procedure to be followed to verify and declare the authenticity of sacred relics and to ensure their preservation. It is up to the dicastery to judge the granting of the title of Doctor of the Church to a saint, after having obtained the vote of the Dicastery for the Doctrine of the Faith about his or her eminent doctrine. The current prefect is Marcello Cardinal Semeraro.

=== Dicastery for Bishops ===
The Dicastery for Bishops oversees the selection of new bishops who are not in mission territories or those areas that come under the jurisdiction of the Dicastery for the Oriental Churches who deal with the Eastern Catholics, pending papal approval. It consequently holds considerable sway over the evolution of the church. It schedules the papal audiences "ad limina apostolorum", required for bishops every five years, and arranges the creation of new dioceses.

The dicastery carries out its activity in a spirit of service and in close collaboration with the episcopal conferences and their regional and continental unions. It endeavors to work with them with regard to the celebration of particular councils and the establishment of episcopal conferences and the recognition of their statutes. It receives the acts and decrees of the above-mentioned bodies, examines them and, after consulting the dicasteries concerned, grants the necessary recognition to the decrees.

As of 26 September 2025, Archbishop Filippo Iannone is its prefect.

==== Associated organization ====
===== Pontifical Commission for Latin America =====
The Pontifical Commission for Latin America is instituted at this dicastery. Its task is to study questions concerning the life and development of these particular churches in order to assist the dicasteries concerned by reason of their competence and to assist them with advice and financial means. It is also responsible for fostering relations between international and national ecclesiastical institutions that work for the regions of Latin America and curial institutions. The president of the commission is ex officio prefect of the dicastery.

=== Dicastery for the Clergy ===
The Dicastery for the Clergy is the department responsible for overseeing matters regarding priests and deacons not belonging to institutes of consecrated life or societies of apostolic life, as well as for the seminaries (except those regulated by the dicasteries for Evangelization and for the Oriental Churches), and houses of formation of religious and secular institutes. It handles requests for dispensation from active priestly ministry, as well as the legislation governing presbyteral councils and other organizations of priests around the world.

The dicastery deals with matters within the competence of the Holy See concerning the general discipline concerning the diocesan council for economic affairs, the presbyteral council, the college of consultors, the chapter of canons, the diocesan pastoral council, the parishes, the churches, the associations of clerics and public clerical associations; to the latter it may grant the faculty of incardination, after consulting the competent dicasteries and receiving the approval of the Roman Pontiff. It deals with ecclesiastical archives and the extinction of pious wills in general and pious foundations. The current prefect is Lazarus Cardinal You Heung-sik.

==== Associated organizations ====
===== Pontifical Work for Priestly Vocations =====
The Pontifical Work for Priestly Vocations (Pontificium Opus Vocationum Sacerdotalium) was established in 1941 to encourage and coordinate efforts to promote vocations to the sacred priesthood of the Catholic Church. It is concerned primarily with setting forth a true and clear notion of the nature, the necessity, and the excellence of the priesthood; it promotes the offering of Masses, Communion services, prayers and works of penance and charity to the end that God may grant many priestly vocations, encourages the growth of the projects that are established in each diocese for priestly vocations, and tries to have such projects set up where they do not already exist. The president of the commission is the ex officio prefect of the dicastery.

===== Interdicasterial Commission for Candidates to Sacred Order =====
The Interdicasterial Commission for Candidates to Sacred Order is established within the dicastery responsible for the selection of candidates for Holy Orders, including their human, spiritual, doctrinal and pastoral training in seminaries and in special centers for permanent deacons, to their continuing formation, including their living conditions and ways of exercising the ministry. The president of the commission is the ex officio prefect of the dicastery.

=== Dicastery for Institutes of Consecrated Life and for Societies of Apostolic life ===
The Dicastery for Institutes of Consecrated Life and for Societies of Apostolic Life is responsible for the promotion, animation and regulation of the practice of the evangelical counsels as it is lived out in the approved forms of consecrated life, and also with regard to the life and activity of Societies of Apostolic Life throughout the Latin Church. It is the responsibility of the dicastery to approve institutes of consecrated life and societies of apostolic life, to erect them and also to grant the license for the validity of the erection of an institute of consecrated life or society of apostolic life of diocesan right by the bishop. The competence of the dicastery also extends to Third Orders and to associations of the faithful erected with a view to becoming an institute of consecrated life or a society of apostolic life. The current prefect is Simona Brambilla, and the current pro-prefect is Cardinal Ángel Fernández Artime.

=== Dicastery for the Laity, Family and Life ===
The Dicastery for the Laity, Family and Life is competent for the enhancement of the apostolate of the lay faithful, the pastoral care of the young, of the family and its mission according to God's plan, of the elderly, and for the promotion and protection of life. In pursuing its own competences, the dicastery maintains relations with the particular churches, with the Bishops' Conferences, their regional and continental Unions, the Oriental Hierarchical Structures and other ecclesial organisms, promoting exchange among them and offering its collaboration so that the values and initiatives connected with these matters may be promoted.

The dicastery expresses the Church's special solicitude for young people, promoting their protagonism in the midst of the world's challenges. It studies and deepens, with the support of experts, the major causes of crises in marriages and families, with particular attention to the experiences of those involved in failed marriages, especially with regard to children, in order to promote a greater awareness of the value of the family and the role of parents in society and in the Church. The current prefect is Kevin Joseph Cardinal Farrell.

==== Associated organizations ====
===== Pontifical Academy for Life =====
The dicastery collaborates with the Pontifical Academy for Life in matters concerning the protection and promotion of human life and makes use of its expertise. It is dedicated to promoting the Church's consistent life ethic. It also does related research on bioethics and Catholic moral theology. As of May 27, 2025, the president of the academy is Archbishop Renzo Pegoraro.

===== Pontifical John Paul II Theological Institute for Matrimonial and Family Science =====
The Pontifical John Paul II Theological Institute for Matrimonial and Family Science is devoted to the study of the truth about the human person in all of its dimensions: theological, philosophical, anthropological, and cosmological. The institute centers its study of the person in the community that is the original cell of human society: marriage and family. The current president of the institute is Monsignor Philippe Bordeyne.

=== Dicastery for Promoting Christian Unity ===
It is the responsibility of the Dicastery for the Promotion of Christian Unity to apply appropriate initiatives and activities to the ecumenical commitment, both within the Catholic Church and inrelations with other Churches and Ecclesial Communities, to restore unity among Christians. It is the task of the dicastery to implement the teachings of the Second Vatican Council and the post-conciliar Magisterium concerning ecumenism. It is responsible for the correct interpretation and faithful application of ecumenical principles and directives established to guide, coordinate and develop ecumenical activity. It also coordinates the ecumenical initiatives of other curial institutions, offices and bodies connected with the Holy See with other churches and ecclesial communities. The current prefect is Cardinal Kurt Koch.

==== Associated organization ====
===== Commission for Religious Relations with the Jews =====
In order to advance the relationship between Catholics and Jews, a Commission for Religious Relations with the Jews is established at the dicastery. It is tasked with maintaining positive theological ties with Jews and Judaism. The president of the commission is the ex officio prefect of the dicastery.

=== Dicastery for Interreligious Dialogue ===
The Dicastery for Interreligious Dialogue promotes and regulates relations with members and groups of religions that are not included under the name of Christianity, with the exception of Judaism, whose competence falls to the Dicastery for the Promotion of Christian Unity. The dicastery works to ensure that dialogue with the followers of other religions takes place in an appropriate manner, with an attitude of listening, esteem and respect. It fosters various forms of relations with them so that, through the contribution of all, peace, freedom, social justice, the protection and safeguarding of creation, and spiritual and moral values may be promoted. The current prefect is George Jacob Cardinal Koovakad.

==== Associated organization ====
===== Commission for Religious Relations with Muslims =====
For the purpose of promoting relations with members of different religious beliefs, the Commission for Religious Relations with Muslims is established within the dicastery. It tasked with maintaining positive theological ties with Muslims. The president of the commission is the ex officio prefect of the dicastery.

=== Dicastery for Culture and Education ===
The Dicastery for Culture and Education works for the development of human values in people within the horizon of Christian anthropology, contributing to the full realization of the following of Jesus Christ. The dicastery is made up of the Section for Culture, which is dedicated to the promotion of culture, pastoral animation, and the valorization of the cultural patrimony, and the Section for Education, which develops the fundamental principles of education with reference to schools, higher institutes of Catholic and ecclesiastical studies and research, and is competent for hierarchical appeals in these matters. The dicastery is formed through the merger of the Pontifical Council for Culture with the Congregation for Catholic Education. The current prefect is José Cardinal Tolentino de Mendonça.

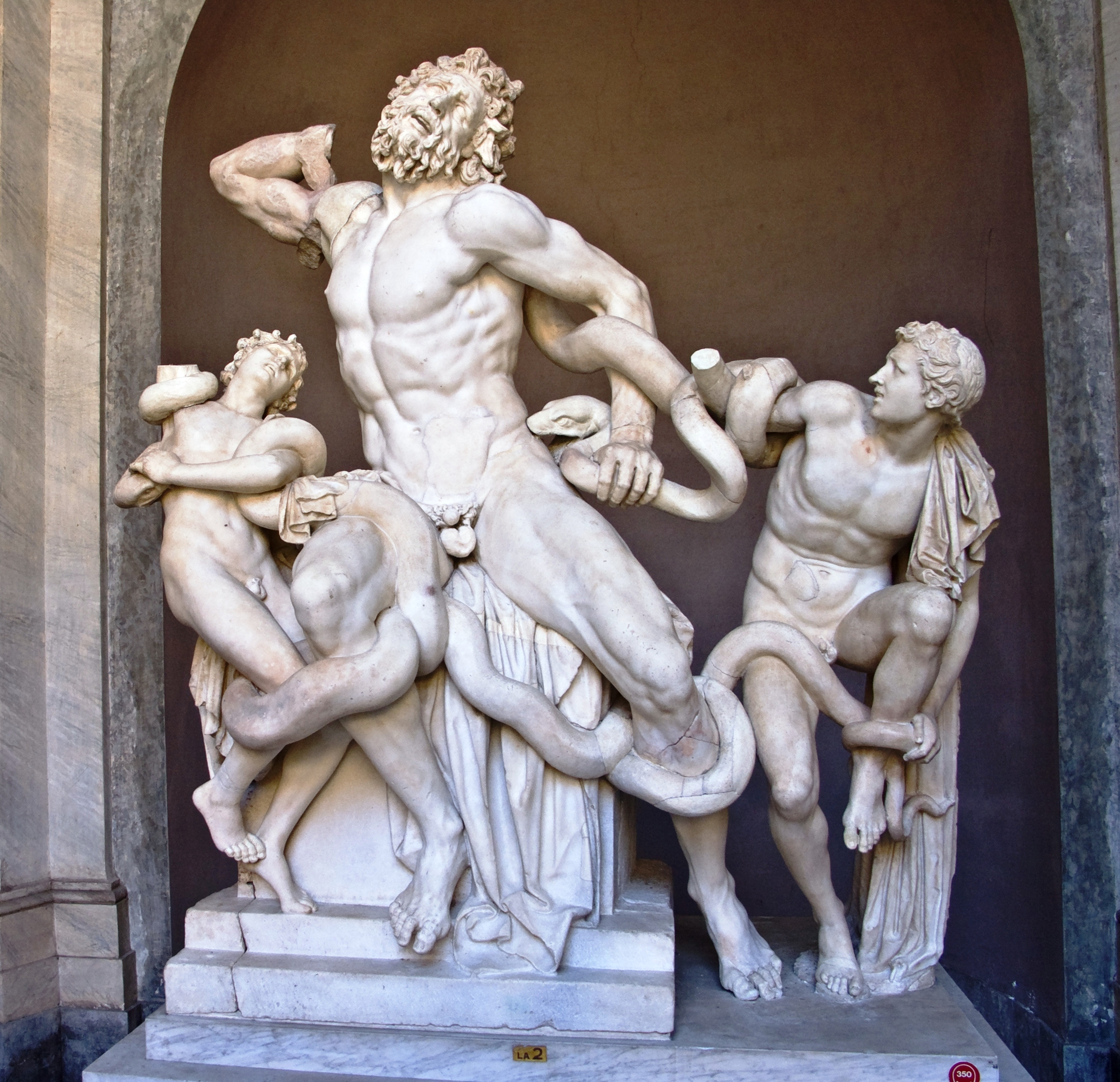
Laocoön and His Sons in the Vatican Museum, which was under the care of the Dicastery for Culture and Education.

==== Section for Culture ====
The Section for Culture promotes and sustains relations between the Holy See and the world of culture, confronting the many requests emerging from it and especially encouraging dialogue as an indispensable means of true encounter, reciprocal interaction and mutual enrichment, so that the various cultures may become increasingly open to the Gospel as well as the Christian faith in them, and so that lovers of the arts, literature and science, of technology and sport may know and feel recognized by the Church as persons at the service of the sincere search for truth, goodness and beauty.

==== Section for Education ====
The Section for Education collaborates with the diocesan/episcopal bishops, the Bishops' Conferences and the Oriental Hierarchical Structures so that the fundamental principles of education, especially Catholic education, may be received and deepened so that they may be implemented contextually and culturally. It is competent to carry out the formalities necessary for the recognition by states of academic degrees granted in the name of the Holy See and to approve and erect Institutes of Higher Studies and other ecclesiastical academic institutions.

==== Associated organizations ====
===== Pontifical Work for Ecclesiastical Vocations =====
The Pontifical Work for Ecclesiastical Vocations is tasked to promotes vocations to the priesthood of the Catholic Church. It is responsible to intensify the desire for promoting, safeguarding, and assisting ecclesiastical vocations; to disseminate an accurate notion of the dignity and necessity of the Catholic priesthood; and to call the faithful of the whole world into a close union of prayers and pious exercises. The president of the commission is the ex officio prefect of the dicastery.

===== Pontifical Academies =====
The Dicastery for Culture and Education also coordinates the activity of some Pontifical Academies, some of which are of ancient foundation, in which the major international personalities of the theological and humanistic sciences are co-opted, chosen from among believers and non- believers. These are currently the:

1. Pontifical Academy of Fine Arts and Letters of the Virtuosi al Pantheon;
2. Pontifical Academy of Archaeology;
3. Pontifical Academy of Theology;
4. Pontifical Academy of St. Thomas Aquinas;
5. Pontifical International Marian Academy;
6. Pontifical Academy of Martyrs; and
7. Pontifical Academy for Latin.

=== Dicastery for Promoting Integral Human Development ===
The Dicastery for the Service of Integral Human Development has the task of promoting the human person and his or her God-given dignity, human rights, health, justice and peace. It is primarily concerned with issues related to the economy and work, care for creation and the earth as "common home", migration and humanitarian emergencies. It deepens and disseminates the Church's social teaching on integral human development and recognizes and interprets in the light of the Gospel the needs and concerns of humankind in its own time and in the future. The dicastery collaborates with the works of the Holy See for humanitarian aid in crisis areas, cooperating with ecclesial humanitarian intervention and development agencies. Effective 1 September 2026, the prefect is Alessandra Smerilli, and the pro-prefect is Fabio Cardinal Baggio, CS.

==== Associated organization ====
===== Vatican COVID-19 Commission =====
The Vatican COVID-19 Commission was created to express the Church's solicitude and care for the whole human family facing the COVID-19 pandemic. Drawing on a wealth of expertise from local communities, global platforms, and academic experts, the Commission seeks bold, broad changes: dignity in work, new structures for the common good, solidarity at the heart of governance, and nature in harmony with social systems. The president of the commission is the ex officio prefect of the dicastery.

=== Dicastery for Legislative Texts ===
The Dicastery for Legislative Texts promotes and spreads within the Church the knowledge and acceptance of the canon law of the Latin Church and that of the Eastern Churches and offers assistance in its correct application. It carries out its duties in the service of the Roman Pontiff, of the curial institutions and offices, of the diocesan/eparchal bishops, of the Episcopal Conferences, of the Eastern hierarchical structures, and also of the supreme moderators of the institutes of consecrated life and of the societies of apostolic life of pontifical right.

In carrying out its tasks, it avails itself of the collaboration of canonists belonging to different cultures and working on different continents. It promotes the study of the Canon Law of the Latin Church and of the Eastern Churches and of other legislative texts by organizing interdicasterial meetings, conferences and by promoting associations of international and national canonists. Archbishop Anthony Randazzo was appointed its prefect on March 25, 2026.

=== Dicastery for Communications ===
The Dicastery for Communication deals with the entire communication system of the Apostolic See and, in structural unity and with respect for the relative operational characteristics, unifies all the realities of the Holy See in the field of communication, so that the entire system responds coherently to the needs of the Church's evangelizing mission in a context characterized by the presence and development of digital media, by the factors of convergence and interactivity. The dicastery provides for the needs of the Church's evangelizing mission using the production models, technological innovations and forms of communication currently available and those that may develop in the time to come. In addition to the expressly operative functions assigned to it, also deepens anddevelops the theological and pastoral aspects of the Church's communicative activity. Effective 1 November 2026, the prefect is Maria Montserrat Alvarado.

==== Associated organizations ====
===== Vatican Press =====
The Vatican press operates in the technological and productive sector, taking forward carrying out all the activities related to the printing and the packaging of the Pontifical documents, and the official documents of the various dicasteries and offices of the Holy See and the Vatican City State. In addition, it also prints the Vatican Newspaper L'Osservatore Romano, and it takes care of other editorial products publications of the entities connected to the Holy See.

===== L'Osservatore Romano =====
The Osservatore Romano is the daily newspaper of Vatican City State which reports on the activities of the Holy See and events taking place in the Church and the world. The current director manager is Professor Andrea Monda.

===== Press Office of the Holy See =====
The Holy See Press Office publishes the official news of the activities of the Holy Father and of the various departments of the Holy See. This includes speeches, messages, and other documents, as well as statements issued by the director of the press office. The current director is Matteo Bruni.

== Institutions of Justice ==
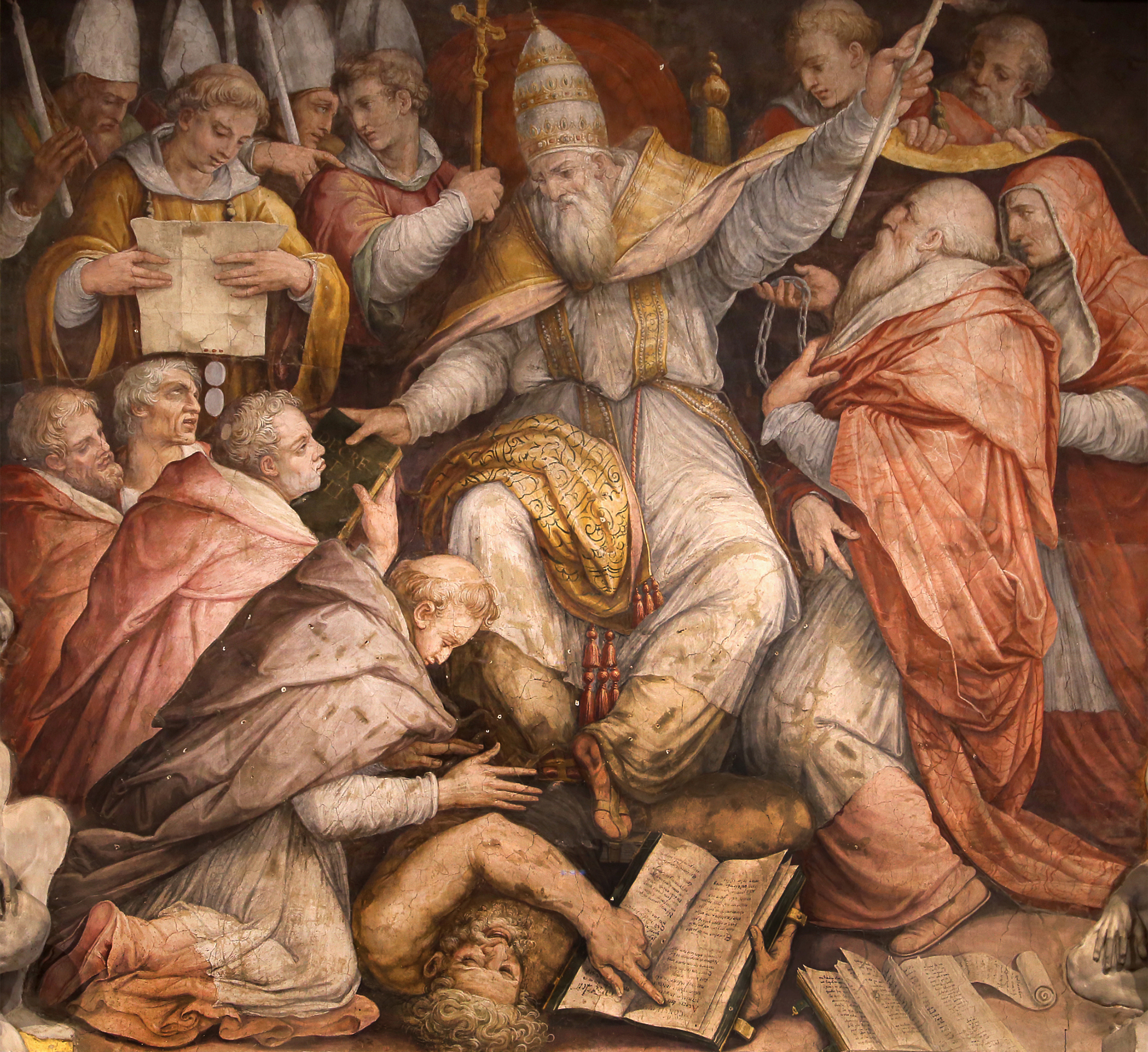
A depiction of Pope Gregory IX excommunicating Holy Roman Emperor Frederick II.

"The service of the Institutions of Justice is one of the essential functions in the government of the Church. The objective of this service, pursued by each institution in the forum of its own competence, is that of the Church's mission: to proclaim and inaugurate the Kingdom of God and to work, through the order of justice applied with canonical equity, for the salvation of souls, which is always the supreme law in the Church" (Praedicate evangelium Article 189 § 1).

=== Apostolic Penitentiary ===
The Apostolic Penitentiary is one of the three tribunals of the Roman Curia. The Apostolic Penitentiary is responsible for issues relating to the forgiveness of sins in the Catholic Church. The Apostolic Penitentiary has jurisdiction only over matters in the internal forum. Its work falls mainly into these categories:

- the absolution of excommunications latæ sententiæ reserved to the Holy See,
- the dispensation of sacramental impediments reserved to the Holy See, and
- the issuance and governance of indulgences.

The current Major Penitentiary is Angelo de Donatis.

=== Supreme Tribunal of the Apostolic Signatura ===
The Supreme Tribunal of the Apostolic Signatura is the highest judicial authority in the Catholic Church besides the Pope himself, who is the supreme ecclesiastical judge. In addition, it is an administrative office for matters pertaining to the judicial activity of the whole church.

Appeals in standard judicial processes, if appealed to the Apostolic See, normally are not handled by the Signatura. Those go to the Roman Rota, which is the ordinary appellate tribunal of the Apostolic See. The Supreme Tribunal handles some of the more specialized kinds of cases, including the following:

- complaints of nullity and requests for restitutio in integrum against judgments of the Roman Rota;
- appeals, in cases concerning the status of persons, against the refusal of a new examination of the case decided by the Roman Rota;
- exceptions of suspicion and other cases against judges of the Roman Rota for acts performed in the exercise of their office; and
- conflicts of jurisdiction between tribunals, which do not depend on the same Appellate Court.

Although a Rotal decision can be appealed, if not res judicata, to a different panel (turnus) of the Rota, there is no right of appeal from a decision of the Signatura, although a complaint of nullity on formal grounds is possible. As an administrative office, it exercises jurisdiction (vigilance) over all the tribunals of the Catholic Church. It can also extend the jurisdiction of tribunals, grant dispensations for procedural laws, establish interdiocesan tribunals, and correct advocates.

The current prefect is Dominique François Joseph Cardinal Mamberti.

=== Tribunal of the Rota Romana ===
The Tribunal of the Roman Rota is the highest appellate tribunal. While usually trying cases in appeal in third instance (as is normally the case in the Eastern Catholic Churches), or even in second instance if appeal is made to it directly from the sentence of a tribunal of first instance, it is also a court of first instance for cases specified in the law and for others committed to the Rota by the Roman Pontiff. It fosters the unity of jurisprudence and, through its own sentences, is a help to lower tribunals.

The greater part of its decisions concern the nullity of marriage. In such cases its competence includes marriages between two Catholics, between a Catholic and non-Catholic, and between two non-Catholic parties whether one or both of the baptized parties belongs to the Latin or an Eastern Rite.

The court is named Rota (Latin for: wheel) because the judges, called auditors, originally met in a round room to hear cases.

The current dean is Most Reverend Alejandro Arellano Cedillo, C.O.R.C.

== Economic organizations ==
=== Council for the Economy ===
The Council for the Economy has the task of supervising the structures and the administrative and financial activities of the curial institutions and of the offices and institutions connected with the Holy See or which refer to it, indicated in the list attached to its Statute. The Council for Economic Affairs shall exercise its functions in the light of the Church's social doctrine and in accordance with internationally recognized best practices in public administration, with a view to ethical and efficient administrative and financial management. The council consists of eight cardinals or bishops, representing the universality of the Church, and seven lay persons, chosen from among experts of various nationalities. The fifteen members are appointed for five years by the Roman Pontiff.

The council submits for the approval of the Roman Pontiff guidelines and norms aimed at ensuring that:

1. the assets of the bodies and administrations subject to its supervision are protected;
2. capital and financial risks are reduced;
3. human, material and financial resources are allocated rationally and managed prudently, efficiently and transparently; and
4. bodies and administrations carry out their duties efficiently, in accordance with the activities, programs and budgets approved for them.

The council examines the proposals put forward by the Secretariat for the Economy, as well as any suggestions presented by the various Administrations of the Holy See, the Authority for Supervision and Financial Information and other entities indicated in its own Statutes.

The current Coordinator is Reinhard Cardinal Marx.

=== Secretariat for the Economy ===
The Secretariat for the Economy performs the function of Papal Secretariat for economic and financial matters. It exercises control and vigilance in administrative, economic and financial matters over curial institutions, offices and institutions connected with the Holy See or which refer to it, as indicated in the list attached to the Statute of the Council for the Economy. It also exercises special control over Peter's Pence and over the other Papal Funds.

The Body is divided into two functional areas: one for regulation, control and supervision in economic and financial matters, and the other for regulation, control and supervision in administrative matters. The Secretariat for the Economy:

1. issues guidelines on economic and financial matters for the Holy See and checks that the activities are carried out in accordance with the operational plans and programs approved;
2. monitors the administrative, economic and financial activities of the institutions entrusted to its control and supervision; proposes and ensures corrective action if necessary;
3. prepares the annual budget, checking that it is adhered to, and the final consolidated budget of the Holy See and submits them to the Council for the Economy; and
4. carries out the annual risk assessment of the patrimonial and financial situation of the Holy See and submits it to the Council for the Economy.

The current prefect is Mister Maximino Caballero Ledo.

==== Directorate for Human Resources of the Holy See ====
The Directorate for Human Resources of the Holy See is established in the Secretariat for the Economy. This office, in dialogue and cooperation with the Institutions concerned, deals with all matters concerning the position and working management of personnel and collaborators of the Institutions subject to the legislation of the Holy See. Among other responsibilities, through this Directorate, the Secretariat for Economic Affairs authorizes hiring, verifying all requirements, and approves the establishment plans of the Entities. The president of the directorate is the ex officio prefect of the secretariat.

=== Administration of the Patrimony of the Apostolic See ===
The Administration of the Patrimony of the Apostolic See deals with the "properties owned by the Holy See in order to provide the funds necessary for the Roman Curia to function". It was established by Pope Paul VI on 15 August 1967.

It is responsible for the administration and management of the real and movable patrimony of the Holy See, intended to provide the resources necessary for the fulfillment of the function proper to the Roman Curia for the good and at the service of the particular churches. The Holy See is responsible for administering the real and movable patrimony of those entities that have entrusted their assets to the Holy See, in accordance with the specific purpose for which the patrimony has been constituted and with the general policies and guidelines approved by the competent bodies. It also provides whatever is necessary for the ordinary activity of the Roman Curia, taking care of the treasury, accounting, purchases and other services. The internal organization of the Body is divided into three functional areas, which deal with property management, financial affairs and services. The current president is Giordano Piccinotti.

=== Office of the Auditor General ===
The Office of the Auditor General is entrusted with the task of auditing the consolidated financial statements of the Holy See. The Office shall have the task, according to the annual audit program approved by the Council for the Economy, of auditing the annual financial statements of the individual curial institutions and of the Offices and Institutions connected with the Holy See or which refer to it, which shall be included in the above-mentioned consolidated financial statements.

At the request of the Council for the Economy, or of the Secretariat for the Economy, or of the Heads of the Entities and Administrations, it shall conduct audits on particular situations related to:

1. anomalies in the use or allocation of financial or material resources;
2. irregularities in the granting of contracts or in the conduct of transactions or disposals; and
3. acts of corruption or fraud.

The same audits may be initiated autonomously by the Auditor General, who shall inform the Cardinal Coordinator of the Council for the Economy in advance, stating the reasons for the audit. The current Auditor-General is Dr. Alessandro Cassinis Righini.

=== Commission for Confidential Matters ===
The Commission for Confidential Matters is responsible to:

1. authorize any act of a juridical, economic, or financial nature which, for the greater good of the Church or persons, must be covered by secrecy and removed from the control and supervision of the competent bodies.
2. monitor and oversee Holy See contracts that require confidentiality under the law.

The commission, according to its own statute, is composed of several Members appointed for five years by the Roman Pontiff. The current president is Kevin Joseph Cardinal Farrell.

=== Committee for Investments ===
The Committee for Investments, a consultative body, is responsible for ensuring the ethical nature of the Holy See's investments in movable assets according to the Church's social doctrine and, at the same time, their profitability, adequacy and risk. The committee is composed, according to its own statute, of members and of high-profile professionals appointed for five years by the Roman Pontiff. The current president is Kevin Joseph Cardinal Farrell.

In 2026, it published two Christian ethical investment indices for other companies to follow suit.

== Offices ==
Praedicate evangelium reorganized the Offices of the Roman Curia, comprising three main bodies.

=== Prefecture of the Papal Household ===
The Prefecture is responsible for internal order in the Pontifical Household and directs, with regard to discipline and service, all those who constitute the Chapel and the Pontifical Family. It is headed by a prefect, assisted by the Regent, appointed for five years by the Roman Pontiff.

The Prefecture of the Papal Household is responsible for the organization and conduct of pontifical ceremonies, excluding the strictly liturgical part, and establishes the order of precedence. It is his duty to order the service of the antechamber and to arrange for public, special and private audiences of the Roman Pontiff and visits to persons, in consultation, as often as circumstances require, with the Secretariat of State. He arranges everything that must be done when heads of state, heads of government, ministers of states, public authorities and other eminent persons, as well as Ambassadors, are received in solemn audience by the Pope himself.

It deals with all that is related to the Spiritual Exercises of the Roman Pontiff, the College of Cardinals and the Roman Curia. It is the responsibility of the Prefecture to make preparations whenever the Roman Pontiff visits Vatican territory, Rome or travels in Italy. The prefect assists him only on the occasion of meetings and visits in Vatican territory. Archbishop Petar Rajič was appointed as its new prefect on March 30, 2026.

=== Office for the Liturgical Celebrations of the Supreme Pontiff ===
It is the responsibility of the Office for the Liturgical Celebrations of the Supreme Pontiff to prepare all that is necessary for liturgical celebrations and other sacred celebrations in the Vatican at which the Roman Pontiff, or – in his name or by his mandate – a Cardinal or Prelate, presides, participates or assists, and to direct them in accordance with the liturgical prescriptions in force, preparing all that is necessary or useful for their worthy conduct and for the active participation of the faithful. The Office shall also take care of the preparation and conduct of all the papal liturgical celebrations taking place during the pastoral visits of the Roman Pontiff on his apostolic journeys.

The Office is headed by the Master of Papal Liturgical Celebrations, appointed for five years by the Roman Pontiff. He is assisted in sacred celebrations by the Pontifical Masters of Ceremonies, appointed for five years by the Roman Pontiff. The Master of Papal Liturgical Celebrations is also responsible for the Papal Sacristy and the Chapels of the Apostolic Palace. The current Master of Papal Liturgical Celebrations is Monsignor Diego Giovanni Ravelli.

==== Pontifical Musical Chorus of the Sistine Chapel ====
The Pontifical Musical Chorus of the Sistine Chapel is responsible for the task of guiding all the liturgical, pastoral, spiritual, artistic and educational activities and areas of the same chapel, which is included in the office as a specific place of service to the papal liturgical functions and at the same time for the custody and promotion of the prestigious artistic-musical heritage produced over the centuries by the chapel itself for the solemn liturgies of the popes. The head of Pontifical Musical Chorus of the Sistine Chapel is the ex officio master of papal liturgical celebrations.

=== Apostolic Camera ===
The Cardinal Camerlengo of Holy Roman Church carries out the functions assigned to him by the special law concerning the vacant Apostolic See and the election of the Roman Pontiff. The Cardinal Camerlengo of Holy Roman Church and the Vice Camerlengo are appointed by the Roman Pontiff.

The task of caring for and administering the goods and temporal rights of the Apostolic See during the time it is vacant is entrusted to the Cardinal Camerlengo of Holy Roman Church. Should he be impeded, the function will be assumed by the Vice Camerlengo. When the Apostolic See is vacant, it is the right and duty of the Cardinal Camerlengo of Holy Roman Church:

1. to request from all the Administrations dependent on the Holy See reports on their patrimonial and economic status, as well as information on extraordinary affairs in progress;
2. to request from the Council for the Economy the preventive and consolidated budgets from the Holy See for the previous year, as well as the budget for the following year;
3. to request, to the extent necessary, from the Secretariat for the Economy any information on the economic state of the Holy See.

The role of Camerlengo of Holy Roman Church is currently vacant as of 8 May 2025, after the election of Pope Leo XIV.

== Institutions connected with the Holy See ==
There are some institutes, both of ancient origin and of new constitution, which, although not properly part of the Roman Curia and having their own juridical personality, nevertheless provide various services necessary or useful to the Roman Pontiff himself, to the Roman Curia and to the universal Church, and are in some way connected with the Curia itself.

=== Labour Office of the Apostolic See ===
The Labour Office of the Apostolic See is responsible for labor relations of the Holy See with its employees. The office also settles labor issues which arise. It was instituted by Pope John Paul II on 1 January 1989 by an apostolic letter in the form of a motu proprio. The activity of the Office relates to the labour, in all its forms and expressions, provided by personnel in the employ of the Roman Curia, of the Governorate of the Vatican City State, and of the Bodies or Institutions administratively managed directly by the Apostolic See. The current president is Bishop Giuseppe Sciacca.

=== Vatican Apostolic Archives ===
The Vatican Apostolic Archives contains the acts and documents that concern the government of the universal Church, making them available to the Holy See and the Roman Curia in the performance of their activities. The archives are also available, by pontifical concession, to scholars, without distinction of country or religion, to study the life of the Church over the centuries. The current Archivist is José Tolentino Cardinal de Mendonça.

=== Vatican Apostolic Library ===
An institution of ancient origin, the Vatican Library has been a distinguished instrument of the Church for the development and dissemination of culture, in support of the activities of the Apostolic See. It has the task, through its various sections, of collecting and preserving a wide patrimony of science and art which can then be made available to scholars. The current librarian is José Tolentino Cardinal de Mendonça.

=== Fabric of Saint Peter ===
The Fabric of Saint Peter is responsible for all matters pertaining to the Papal Basilica of Saint Peter's, which houses the memory of the martyrdom and the tomb of the Apostle, both for the preservation and decorum of the building and for the internal discipline of the custodians and of pilgrims and visitors, according to its own norms. In necessary cases, the president and the secretary of the Fabric act in agreement with the Chapter of the Basilica itself. The current president is Mauro Cardinal Gambetti, O.F.M. Conv.

=== Pontifical Commission for Sacred Archaeology ===
The Pontifical Commission for Sacred Archaeology has the task of studying, preserving, protecting and enhancing the Christian catacombs of Italy, in which the testimonies of faith and art of the first Christian communities continue to transmit their profound message to pilgrims and visitors. The current president is Gianfranco Cardinal Ravasi.

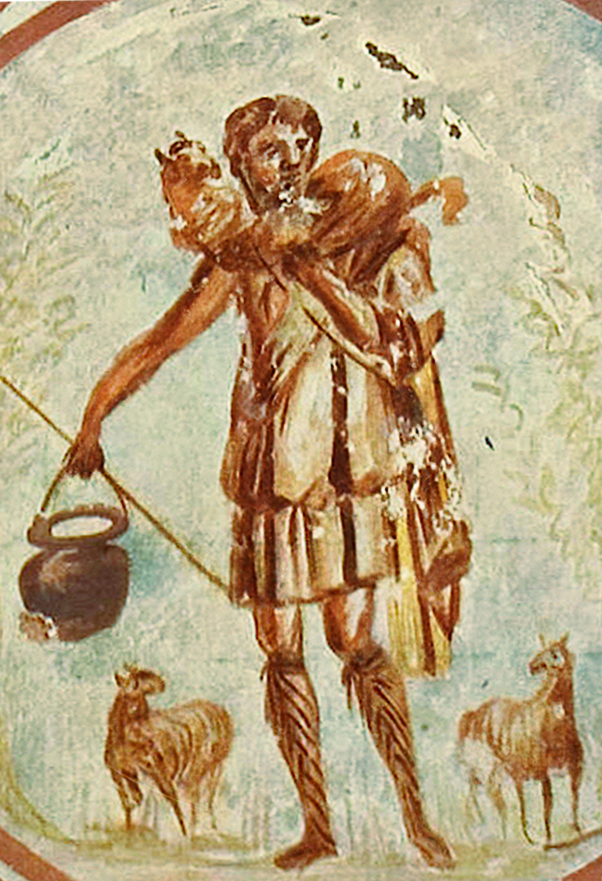
Good Shepherd fresco from the Catacombs of San Callisto under the care of the Pontifical Commission for Sacred Archeology

=== Pontifical Academies ===
For the search for and dissemination of truth in the various fields of divine and human science, several Academies have arisen within the Catholic Church, among which the Pontifical Academy of Sciences, the Pontifical Academy of Social Sciences and the Pontifical Academy for Life stand out.

=== Agency for the Evaluation and Promotion of Quality in Ecclesiastical Faculties ===
In order to promote and develop a culture of quality within the academic institutions directly dependent on the Holy See and to assure them internationally valid criteria of quality, the Agency for the Evaluation and Promotion of Quality in Ecclesiastical Faculties is established. The current president is Father Andrzej Stefan Wodka, C.Ss.R.

=== Supervisory and Financial Information Authority ===
The Supervisory and Financial Information Authority is the institution which, in the manner provided for by law and by its own Statute, performs the functions of: supervision for the purposes of preventing and combating money laundering and the financing of terrorism with respect to entities and subjects subjected to its supervision; prudential supervision of entities that professionally carry out activities of a financial nature; prudential regulation of entities that professionally carry out activities of a financial nature and, in the cases provided for by law, in matters concerning the prevention of and fight against money laundering and terrorist financing. In this capacity it also carries out the financial information function. The current president is Dr. Carmelo Barbagallo.

=== Domus Vaticanae ===
Domus Vaticanae is a merger of the four foundations dedicated to hospitality in the Vatican. It has merged the Domus Sanctae Marthae, Domus Romana Sacerdotalis, Domus Internationalis Paulus VI, and Casa San Benedetto foundations into the new institution, which Pope Francis established as a public canonical juridic person in 2024.

It pursues the hospitality goals of the merged foundations with each having its own purpose:

- Domus Sanctae Marthae, also known as the Casa Santa Marta or St. Martha's House, is a guest house adjacent to St. Peter's Basilica that accommodates clergy visiting the Vatican, as well as cardinals taking part in papal conclaves. This was the residence of Pope Francis.
- Domus Romana Sacerdotalis and Domus Internationalis Paulus VI, offering hospitality to clergy assigned to the diplomatic service of the Holy See or working in the Roman Curia, as well as priests, bishops, and cardinals visiting Rome.
- Casa San Benedetto provides accommodation for retired Vatican diplomatic personnel.

== Interdicasterial commissions ==
An interdicasterial commission is established to deal with matters involving the works of several institutions and dicasteries of the Roman Curia.

=== Interdicasterial Commission on Particular Churches ===
The Permanent Interdicasterial Commission on Particular Churches is responsible for managing and taking care of the relationship and communication between the Latin Church and the Eastern Catholic Churches. The president of the commission is the ex officio secretary of the state.

=== Interdicasterial Commission for the Church in Eastern Europe ===
The Permanent Interdicasterial Commission for the Church in Eastern Europe is responsible to better deal with the rapidly changing situations in the early 1990s on Eastern Europe. The president of the commission is the ex officio secretary of the state.

=== Interdicasterial Commission for Consecrated Religious ===
The Permanent Interdicasterial Commission for Consecrated Religious is responsible to better handle consecrated religious in missionary areas, mostly in Africa and Asia. The president of the commission is the ex officio Pro-prefect for the Section of First Evangelization of the Dicastery for Evangelization.

=== Interdicasterial Commission for Candidates to Sacred Order ===
The Permanent Interdicasterial Commission for Candidates to Sacred Order is responsible for the selection of candidates for Holy Orders, including their human, spiritual, doctrinal and pastoral training in seminaries. The president of the commission is the ex officio prefect of the Dicastery for the Clergy.

== Other commissions and committees ==
=== Pontifical Committee for International Eucharistic Congresses ===
The Pontifical Committee for International Eucharistic Congresses is responsible "to make ever better known, loved and served, Our Lord Jesus Christ in his Eucharistic Mystery, as center of the life of the Church and of its mission for the salvation of the world" through the celebration of International Eucharistic Congresses. It also ensures the adequate pastoral preparation of these International Eucharistic Congresses and requests the Episcopal Conferences and Patriarchal Synods to appoint National Delegates, who will be committed to work for the preparation of the Congresses and, where necessary, set up National Eucharistic Committees with the approval and collaboration of the local ecclesiastical authority. The current president is Father Corrado Maggioni, S.M.M.

=== Pontifical Committee for Historical Sciences ===
The Pontifical Committee for Historical Sciences is charged with promoting the use of ecclesiastical archives for historical research and fostering cooperation with ecclesiastical and extra-ecclesial institutions and associations, particularly at the international level. It sponsors seminars and conferences, both independently and in concert with peer organizations; reviews the historical data presented in the Pontifical Yearbook; collaborates with multinational scientific initiatives (UNESCO); and sponsors internships for the study of Latin and Greek.

=== Commission for Advocates ===
The body called "Advocates of the Holy See" is composed mainly of advocates listed in the roster of advocates, and its members are able to undertake the representation of cases in civil or ecclesiastical tribunals in the name of the Holy See or the dicasteries of the Roman Curia. The president of the commission is the ex officio prefect of the Supreme Tribunal of the Apostolic Signatura.

=== Pontifical Swiss Guards ===
The Pontifical Swiss Guards is a minor armed force and honour guard unit maintained by the Holy See that protects the pope and the Apostolic Palace within the territory of the Vatican City. Established in 1506 under Pope Julius II, the Pontifical Swiss Guard is among the oldest military units in continuous operation.

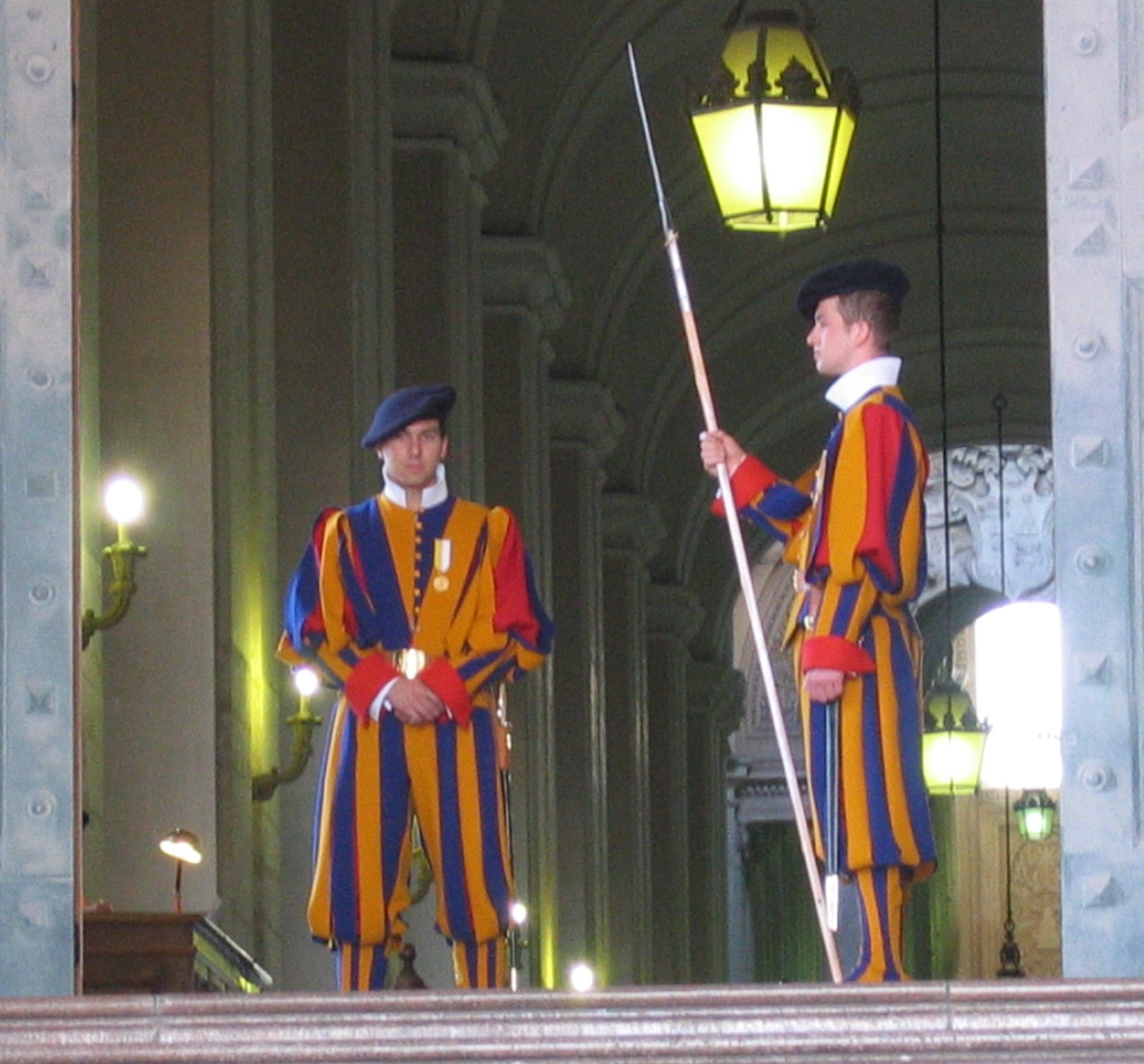
Members of the Pontifical Swiss Guard at the Prefettura della casa pontificia in Vatican City.

They serve as personal escorts to the pontiff and as watchmen for Vatican City and the pontifical villa of Castel Gandolfo. The guards, who are independent of the Swiss armed forces, are employed by the Catholic Church under the leadership of the pope, to whom they swear fealty in a ceremony at Belvedere Court.

The current Commander is Colonel Christoph Graf.

=== Disciplinary Commission of the Roman Curia ===
Established by John Paul II in 1981, the Disciplinary Commission of the Roman Curia rules whether an administrative sanction – i.e., suspension or firing – can be imposed on a Roman Curia official is pertinent or not. The current president is Prof. Vincenzo Buonomo.

=== Financial Security Committee ===
The Financial Security Committee is established for the purpose of coordinating the competent authorities of the Holy See and of Vatican City State for the prevention and countering of money laundering, the financing of terrorism and the proliferation of weapons of mass destruction.

=== Commission of Cardinals overseeing the Institute for Works of Religion ===
The Commission of Cardinals overseeing the Institute for Works of Religion is a body composed of a president and four member cardinals that oversees the Institute for Works of Religion, commonly known as the Vatican Bank, a financial institution situated inside Vatican City and run by a Board of Superintendence which reports to a Commission of Cardinals and the Pope. It is not a private bank, as there are no owners or shareholders, but it has been established in the form of a juridical canonical foundation, pursuant to its Statutes. The current president of the commission is Santos Cardinal Abril y Castelló.

=== Pontifical Commission for the Activities of Public Juridical Persons of the Church in the Healthcare Sector ===
The Pontifical Commission for the Activities of Public Juridical Persons of the Church in the Healthcare Sector was designed as an organ of the Roman Curia, attached to the Secretariat of State and its regulations with the responsibility to control and supervise how the health facilities managed by religious congregations manage money and assets and to stay true to their founding mission and spirit. The current president of the commission is Pietro Cardinal Parolin.

=== Pontifical Commission for the Verification and Application of Mitis Iudex in the Churches of Italy ===
The Pontifical Commission for the Verification and Application of Mitis Iudex in the Churches of Italy directly support the Churches that are in Italy in receiving the reform of the canonical process for the cases of declaration of nullity of marriage, giving new impetus to the application of the motu proprio Mitis Iudex. A declaration of nullity – often referred to as an "annulment" – is a ruling by a tribunal that a marriage did not meet the conditions required to make it valid according to Church law.

Mitis Iudex Dominus Iesus, issued in 2015, made changes to canon law intended to streamline the process by which Church tribunals assess requests for declarations of the nullity of marriages. The text also emphasized the local bishop's role in the process. The current president is Monsignor Alejandro Arellano Cedillo, C.O.R.C.

=== Holy See Agency for the Evaluation and Promotion of the Quality of Ecclesiastical Universities and Faculties (AVEPRO) ===
The Agency of the Holy See for the Evaluation and Promotion of Quality in Ecclesiastical Universities and Faculties (AVEPRO; Agenzia della Santa Sede per la Valutazione e la Promozione della Qualità delle Università e Facoltà Ecclesiastiche) was established by Pope Benedict XVI on September 19, 2007. It aims to enhance quality within academic institutions tied to the Holy See, aligning with international standards. This initiative was partly inspired by the Holy See's involvement in the Bologna Process in 2003, aiming to respect the diversity of university systems, promote a common higher education area, and emphasize quality in university research and innovation. AVEPRO's work is guided by the Apostolic Constitution Sapientia Christiana and adheres to European and international quality evaluation standards. The agency supports academic institutions in internal and external quality evaluations, collaborating with various stakeholders in ecclesiastical education.

=== Order of the Holy Sepulchre ===
The Pontifical Order of the Holy Sepulchre of Jerusalem is a Catholic chivalric order that is under the direct protection of the Holy See and is represented in 40 countries. The Order of Knights was founded in the pilgrimage movement of the Middle Ages and was established in 1868 as a Catholic lay order to support the Latin Patriarchate of Jerusalem. Today, around 30,000 priests and laymen, men and women belong to it.

The mission of the order, which was recognised by the Vatican for its commitment to the Christian presence in Jerusalem, has evolved over the centuries. Today, the Order focuses on providing financial, spiritual and moral support to the Latin Patriarchate of Jerusalem and assists in the preservation and support of Christian sites, institutions and communities in the Holy Land. Membership of the Order is considered a very high honour and is bestowed on lay people, clergy and knights who have rendered exemplary service to the Catholic Church, particularly through initiatives that contribute to the preservation of the Christian faith in Jerusalem and the surrounding area.

=== Fondazione Centesimus Annus pro pontifice ===
The Fondazione Centesimus Annus Pro Pontifice (FCAPP) is a Catholic Vatican foundation that was established in 1993 by Pope John Paul II together with 40 entrepreneurs. It is named after his encyclical "Centesimus Annus", which was published in 1991 on the centenary of Pope Leo XIII's encyclical "Rerum Novarum" and dealt with issues of labour, the economy and social justice. The aim of the foundation is to promote discussion of the social doctrine of the Catholic Church as formulated in "Centesimus Annus" and later teachings. The FCAPP focuses on promoting discussion and research on the relationship between ethics and economics and organises conferences, seminars and workshops for business leaders, academics and other stakeholders to explore these issues. Through its activities, the foundation is committed to contributing as a think tank to the development of a more just and equitable society in line with Catholic social teaching. The foundation is based in San Damaso in the Vatican Secretariat of State.

== See also ==
- Papal household
- Anticurialism
- Politics of Vatican City
- Pope Paul VI's reform of the Roman Curia
- Pastor bonus
- Praedicate evangelium
