= Pontifical academy =

Academic honorary society established by or under the direction of the Holy See

A pontifical academy is an academic honorary society established by or under the direction of the Holy See. Some were in existence well before they were accepted as "Pontifical."

== List ==
There are ten Pontifical academies headquartered at the Vatican in Rome.

- The Pontifical Academy of Fine Arts and Letters of the Virtuosi al Pantheon or Pontificia Insigne Accademia di Belle Arti e Letteratura dei Virtuosi al Pantheon in Italian was established in 1542. Its purpose is to study, cultivate, and perfect the fine arts.
- The Pontifical Academy of Sciences or Pontificia Accademia delle Scienze was founded in 1603 to honor and promote research.
- The Pontifical Academy of Theology or Pontificia Accademia di Teologia, founded in 1718, promotes the Catholic faith.
- The Pontifical Academy of Archaeology or Pontificia Accademia Romana di Archeologia, founded in 1810, promotes Christian archeology and the history of Christian art.
- The Pontifical Academy of Martyrs or Pontificia Academia Cultorum Martyrum dates from 1879 and promotes the veneration of the martyrs and the study of the catacombs.
- The Pontifical Academy of St. Thomas Aquinas or Pontificia Accademia di San Tommaso d'Aquino, founded in 1879, promotes the study of Thomism.
- The Pontifical Academy of Mary or Pontificia Academia Mariana Internationalis was established in 1946 and promotes Mariology.
- The Pontifical Academy for Life or Pontificia Accademia Pro Vita was founded in 1994 to promote the consistent life ethic of the Roman Catholic Church; it was formerly headed by Bishop Elio Sgreccia, and now by Archbishop Salvatore Fisichella, former rector of the Pontifical Lateran University.
- The Pontifical Academy of Social Sciences or Pontificia Accademia delle Scienze Sociali, founded 1994, promotes social, economic, political, and legal sciences in the light of the church's social teachings.
- The Pontifical Academy for Latin, also Pontificia Academia Latinitatis or Pontificia Accademia di Latinità was established in 2012 for the dissemination and education of Latin.

== Pontifical Ecclesiastical Academy ==
The Pontifical Ecclesiastical Academy, an institution for the training of Catholic clergy to serve as apostolic nuncios, pro-nuncios or papal delegates, is not one of the pontifical academies, but is one of the Roman Colleges.

== See also ==
- Global organisation of the Catholic Church
- Index of Vatican City-related articles
