= Pontifical Academy of Theology =

The Pontifical Academy of Theology (Italian: Pontificia Accademia di Teologia) is a learned society founded in 1718, and is a Pontifical Academy. It is situated at Via della Conciliazione, Vatican City, Rome.

== History ==
The Pontifical Academy of Theology was founded by Clement XI in 1718, and fostered by Benedict XIII, Clement XIV, and then by Gregory XVI who on 26 October 1838 approved statutes for it. On 28 January 1999 Pope John Paul II approved a revised set of statutes for this academy, writing that "The principal mission of theology today consists in promoting dialogue between Revelation and the doctrine of the faith, and in offering an ever deeper understanding of it." Those statutes charge the academy with promoting theological studies and dialogue with philosophical disciplines.

It is led by a president and a secretary appointed by the pope to five-year terms, renewable upon the advice of the academy without limitation. There are 40 ordinary members (academicians), who take emeritus status at the age of 80. The members choose four of their number to serve with the secretary on a council to govern the academy and it convenes at least annually. Additional correspondent members are not limited in number. The academy reports its activities to the Pontifical Council for Culture and works in concert with the Congregation for Catholic Education.

With Pope Francis' reorganization of the Roman Curia as of 5 June 2022 as provided for in the apostolic constitution Praedicate evangelium, the new Dicastery for Culture and Education became responsible for coordinating the work of this academy with its own work and that of a number of other bodies.

New statutes were issued in November 2023 that shift the focus of the academy from promoting the dialogue between reason and faith, to promoting trans-disciplinary dialogue with philosophies, sciences, arts, and all other knowledge.

== See also ==
- Global organisation of the Catholic Church
- Index of Vatican City-related articles
