= José Tolentino de Mendonça =

Portuguese Catholic prelate and intellectual (born 1965)

His Eminence José Tolentino de Mendonça TOSD ComSE ComIH
- Prefect of the Dicastery for Culture and Education
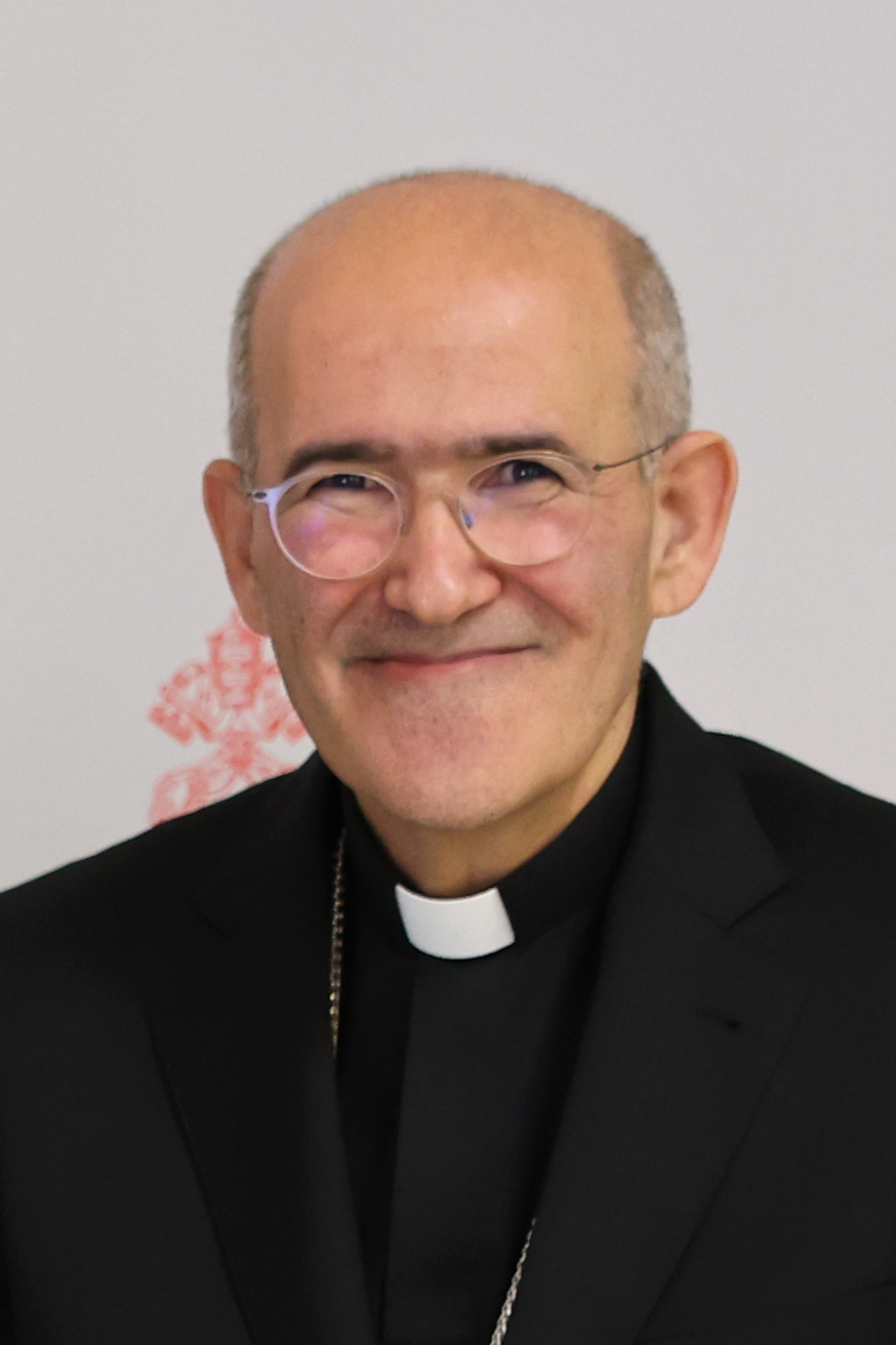
- Mendonça on 30 March 2026
- Church: Catholic Church
- Appointed: 26 September 2022
- Other post: Cardinal-Deacon of Santi Domenico e Sisto (2019-)
- Previous posts: Titular Archbishop of Suava (2018-19); Librarian and Archivist of the Holy Roman Church (2018–2022)

Orders
- Ordination: 28 July 1990 by Teodoro de Faria
- Consecration: 28 July 2018 by Manuel III, Cardinal-Patriarch of Lisbon
- Created cardinal: 5 October 2019 by Pope Francis
- Rank: Cardinal-Deacon

Personal details
- Born: José Tolentino Calaça de Mendonça; 15 December 1965 (age 60) Funchal, Madeira, Portugal
- Denomination: Catholic
- Occupation: Writer, academic, administrator
- Education: Catholic University of Portugal; Pontifical Biblical Institute
- Motto: Considerate lilia agri (Consider the lilies of the field), Mt 6:28
- Coat of arms

José Tolentino Calaça de Mendonça TOSD, ComSE, ComIH (born 15 December 1965) is a Portuguese prelate of the Catholic Church. A theologian and university professor, he is also regarded as one of the most original voices of modern Portuguese literature and a Catholic intellectual. His work includes poetry, essays and plays that he signs José Tolentino Mendonça.

He was appointed prefect of the Dicastery for Culture and Education and Grand Chancellor of the Pontifical Institute for Christian Archaeology in September 2022. An archbishop since July 2018, he was Archivist and Librarian of the Holy Roman Church from 2018 to 2022. Pope Francis created him cardinal on 5 October 2019. Since 2020, he has been a member of the Third Order of Saint Dominic.

== Biography ==
=== Early life and family ===
The youngest of five children, de Mendonça was born in Funchal on the island of Madeira, Portugal on 15 December 1965. He spent his earliest years in Angola, in several coastal towns where his father was a fisherman. He left Africa at the age of nine when Portugal withdrew from its African colonies.

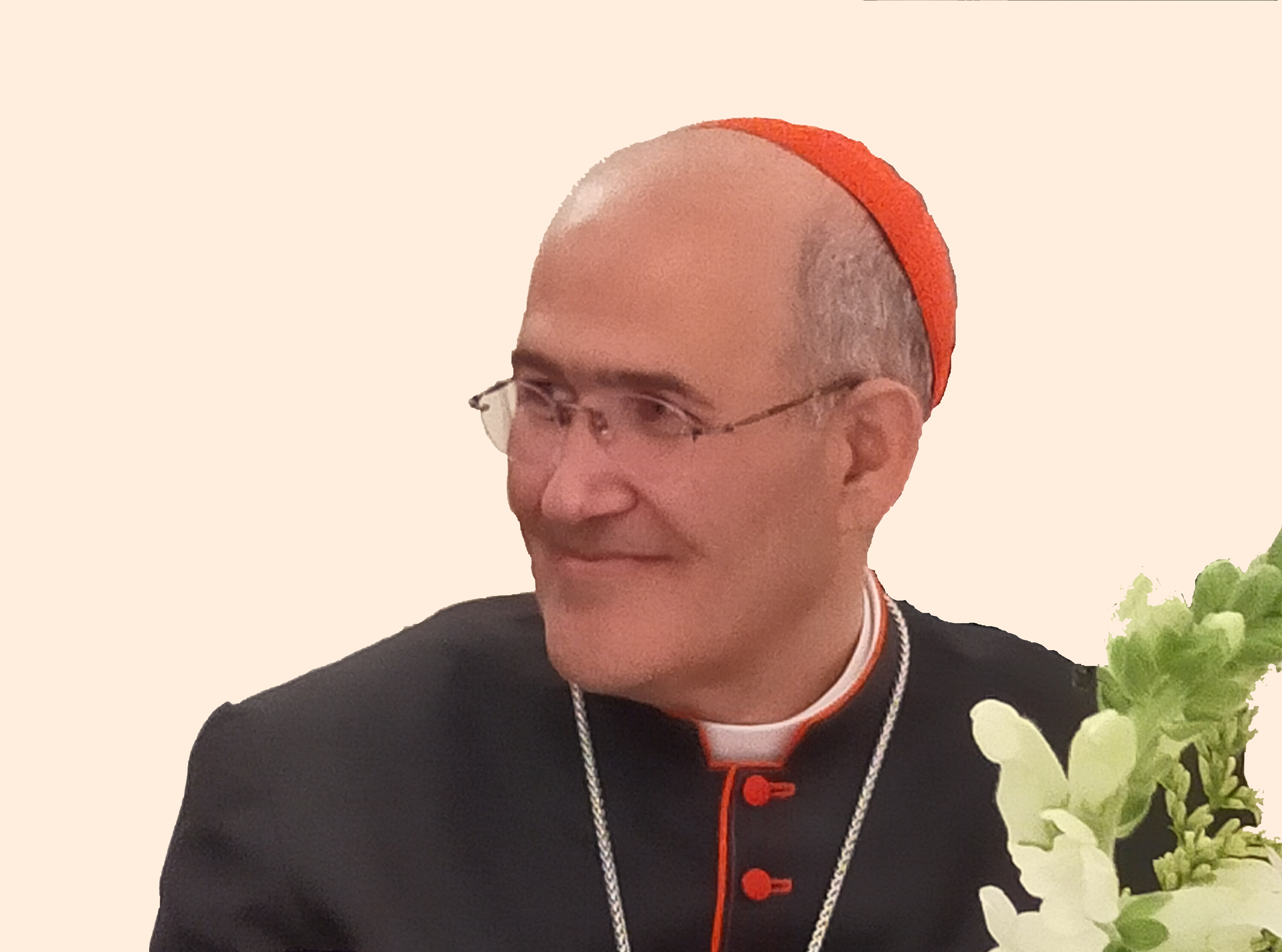
Cardinal José Tolentino de Mendonça, 15 May 2021

=== Priest and academic ===
In 1989, he graduated with the equivalent of a bachelor's degree in theology from the Portuguese Catholic University (UCP). He was ordained a priest for the Diocese of Funchal, Madeira, on 28 July 1990. That same year he published his first book of poems, Os Dias Contados. In 1992, he was awarded a master's degree in biblical sciences at the Pontifical Biblical Institute in Rome. In 2004, he earned a doctorate in biblical theology at the Portuguese Catholic University (UCP).

He has fulfilled pastoral assignments, first of all at the parish of Nossa Senhora do Livramento in Funchal from 1992 to 1995, then as chaplain at the UCP for 5 years. He next served the parish of Santa Isabel in Lisbon and then became rector of the chapel of Nossa Senhora da Bonanza, better known as Capela do Rato, in 2010.

On 4 August 2021, de Mendonça took his vows as a member of the Third Order of Saint Dominic at a ceremony held at the São Domingos convent in Lisbon and presided over Mass following the ceremony in which he received the white habit. In his capacity as a member in the secular order, he does not possess any obligations towards the official Dominican hierarchy, but he commits to the charism of the Dominicans and to live in accordance with their vows. He made his initial rite of admission to and received the habit from Father José Nunes, the prior provincial for the Portuguese Dominicans.

De Mendonça's assignments following his ordination included academic appointments as a lecturer at the diocesan seminary of Funchal, the rector of the Pontifical Portuguese College in Rome, and a lecturer at the Portuguese Catholic University. He was visiting professor the Catholic University of Pernambuco (Unicap), Brazil, the Pontifical Catholic University of Rio de Janeiro and the Jesuit School of Philosophy and Theology of Belo Horizonte (Faje). In Lisbon, he joined the UCP faculty as an assistant (1996-1999), assistant professor (2005-2015), and associate professor. The UCP appointed him Vice-Rector in 2012 and Dean of the Faculty of Theology in 2018. During the academic year 2011–12, he was a Straus Fellow at New York University, joining an international team of researchers working on the theme "Religion and Public Reason".

=== At the service of culture ===
De Mendonça was the first director of the National Secretariat of the Pastoral of Culture from 2004 to 2014, an institution created by the Portuguese Episcopal Conference to promote dialogue between the Church and the broader cultural milieu of the country.

After attending a meeting with Pope Benedict XVI bringing together a large number of artists in 2009, he said that the Pope's gesture of hospitality was appreciated. Benedict pointed out that "within the Church, within the Christian space, they have their home, a sort of homeland". In 2011 Benedict XVI appointed him a consultor of the Pontifical Council for Culture. Pope Francis reappointed him to this position in 2016.

In 2018 Pope Francis invited de Mendonça to preach the Lenten Retreat of the Roman Curia. Besides the Bible, his comments referenced many writers, such as Fernando Pessoa, Roland Barthes, Clarice Lispector, Françoise Dolto, Etty Hillesum and Blaise Pascal. He commented: "Sometimes writers are important spiritual masters." He also mentioned that he tells his biblical students that "a biblical scholar or a priest must see many movies, listen to a lot of music and get in touch with the arts world". These sermons were published under the title Elogio da Sede with a preface by Pope Francis.

In January 2020, de Mendonça was part of the scientific commission for the 700th anniversary of Dante Alighieri's death (1265-1321) organized by the Pontifical Council for Culture.

In February 2020, Pope Francis appointed de Mendonça as a member of the Pontifical Council for Culture, chaired by Cardinal Gianfranco Ravasi. De Mendonça had been a consultor between 2011 and 2018.

On 13 June 2020, de Mendonça is laureate of Prémio Europeu Helena Vaz da Silva because of "the ability he shows in spreading beauty and poetry as part of the intangible cultural heritage of Europe and the world".

Under the leadership of Cardinal Tolentino de Mendonça, as part of the 50th anniversary of the inauguration of the Modern Art Collection of the Vatican Museums, the Dicastery of Culture and Education is the main organiser of a meeting between Pope Francis and some two hundred representatives of the cultural world, artists, writers, composers, musicians, actors, architects, etc. from all over the world. This event, the first since 2009, when José Tolentino de Mendonça took part, takes place on 23 June 2023 in the Sistine Chapel. The participants include Ken Loach, Anish Kapoor, Andres Serrano and many others.

Cardinal José Tolentino de Mendonça is the commissioner of the Vatican pavilion at the 60th Venice Biennale (20.04.2024-24.11.2024). The pavilion is being held in La Giudecca women's prison, which is still in operation. Eighty inmates are serving long sentences there, and some of them have agreed to guide visitors on their way to La Giudecca. Pope Francis, the first pope to visit the Venice Biennale, visits the pavilion on 28 April.

De Mendonça has published numerous collections of essays, spiritual writings, poems and sermons under the name José Tolentino Mendonça. This work addresses the major themes of the Christian canon by placing them in dialogue with life. The relationship between Christianity and culture is at the heart of his writings. As a theologian and religious thinker, he has sought to discover spiritual life in places which have not always been looked at, and he has striven to encourage the Church to be more relevant and more engaged there. His books have been great successes in Portugal and are increasingly translated and published abroad. He has received numerous literary prizes and awards.

=== Bishop and cardinal ===
At the end of June 2018, Pope Francis named de Mendonça Vatican archivist and Librarian of the Holy Roman Church as of 1 September and appointed him titular archbishop of Suava. On 28 July, Archbishop Manuel Clemente, Cardinal Patriarch of Lisbon, consecrated him a bishop assisted by Cardinal António Marto, Bishop of Leiria-Fátima, and Teodoro de Faria, Bishop Emeritus of Funchal who had ordained him a priest in July 1990.

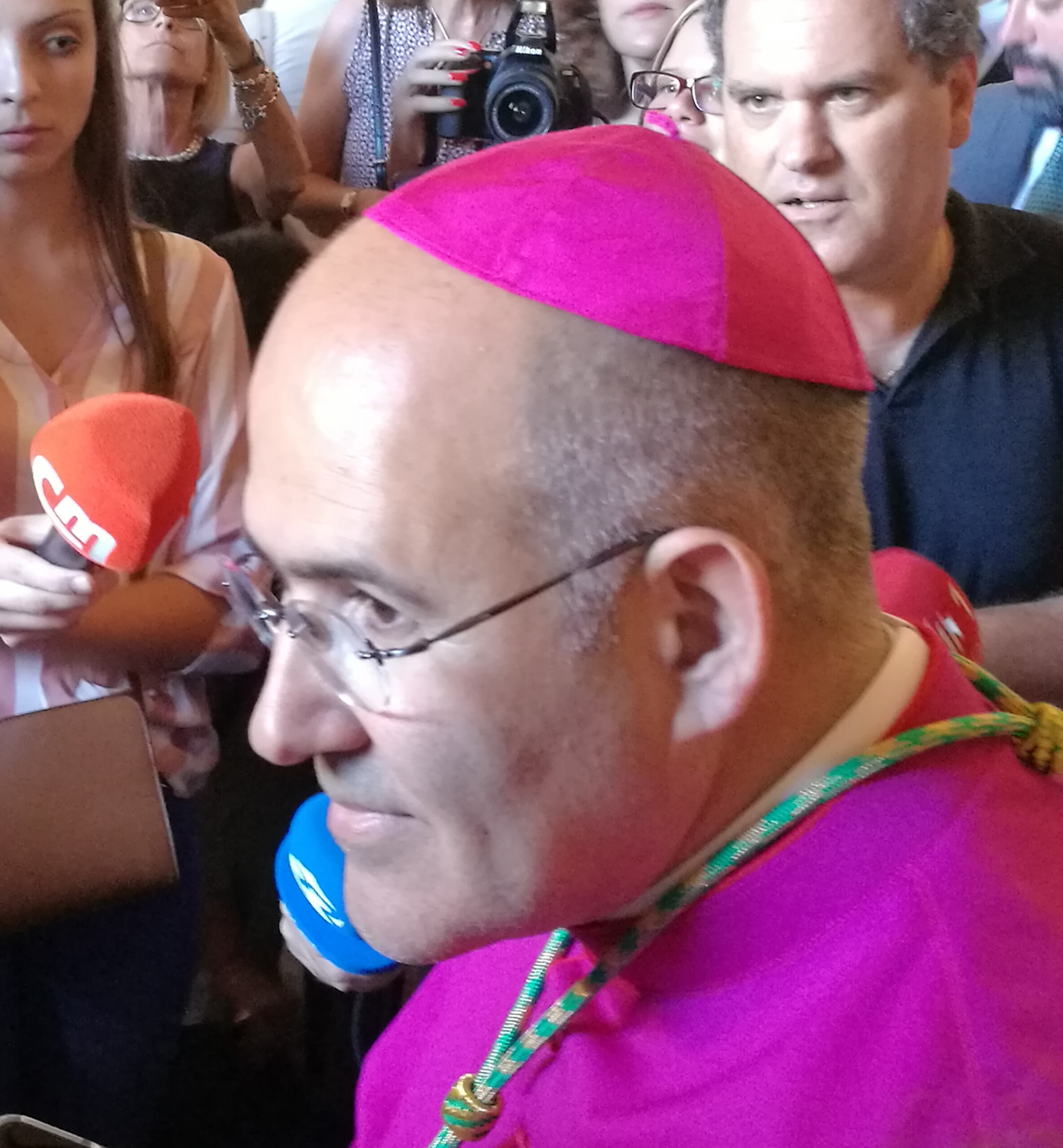
De Mendonça, Western Belém, 28 July 2018, the date of his episcopal consecration

On 5 October 2019, Pope Francis made him a Cardinal-Deacon and assigned him the church of Santi Domenico e Sisto in Rome. He was made a member of the Pontifical Council for Culture on 21 February 2020.

On 17 November 2020, Pope Francis appointed de Mendonça a member of the Congregation for the Evangelization of Peoples presided over by Cardinal Luis Antonio Tagle.

On 30 April 2022, Pope Francis appointed de Mendonça a member of the Congregation for the Causes of Saints, presided over by Cardinal Marcello Semeraro.

On 13 July 2022, the Pope appointed 13 new members to the Dicastery for Bishops, including 3 women. Cardinal Tolentino de Mendonça is one of the 11 other members of this dicastery, whose prefect is Cardinal Marc Ouellet.

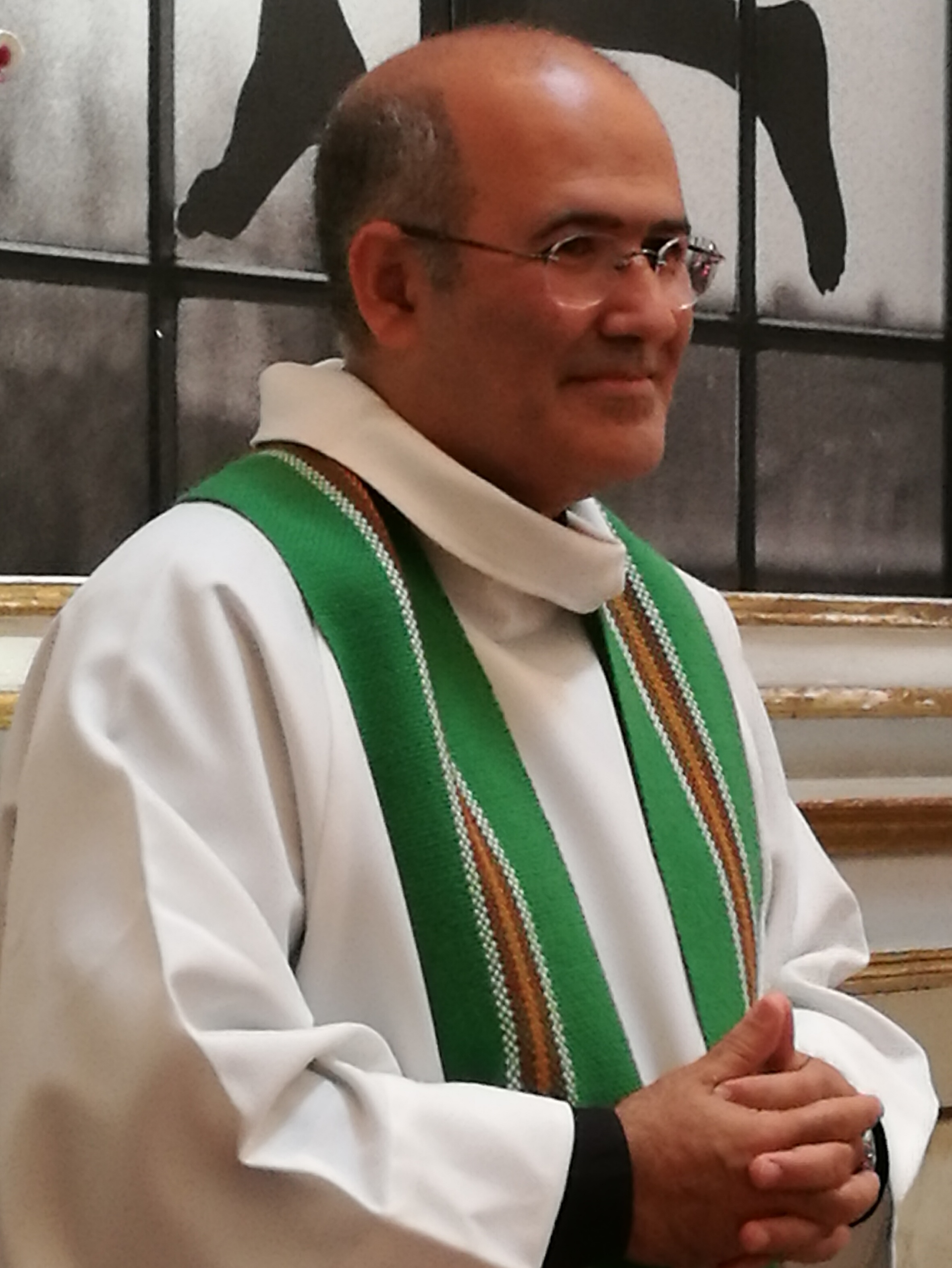
De Mendonça at Capela do Rato 22. July 2018

On 26 September 2022, Pope Francis named him prefect of the Dicastery for Culture and Education.

On 7 September 2023, Pope Francis appointed Cardinal Tolentino de Mendonça a member of the Dicastery for Divine Worship and the Discipline of the Sacraments, of which Cardinal Arthur Roche is the Prefect.

On 1 June 2024, Pope Francis appointed Cardinal Tolentino de Mendonça a member of the Dicastery for the Doctrine of the Faith, of which Cardinal Víctor Manuel Fernández is the Prefect.

Prior to the death of Pope Francis, de Mendonça had been referred to as potentially papabile—a possible future candidate for the papacy. He participated as a cardinal elector in the 2025 papal conclave, which ultimately elected Robert Francis Prevost as Pope Leo XIV.

== Writings ==
=== in Portuguese ===
- Os dias contados (poetry, 1990)
- As estratégias do desejo: um discurso bíblico sobre a sexualidade (essay, 1994)
- Longe não sabia (poetry, 1997)
- A que distância deixaste o coração (poetry, 1998)
- Se eu quiser falar com Deus (1996)
- Baldios (poetry, 1999)
- Cântico dos Cânticos (1999)
- De Igual para Igual (poetry, 2000)
- A construção de Jesus: uma leitura narrativa de Lucas 7,36-50 (essay, 2004)
- A estrada branca (poetry, 2005)
- Perdoar Helena (play, 2005)
- Tábuas de pedra (poetry, 2006)
- A noite abre os meus olhos (poetry, 2006)
- Pentateuco (2006)
- Bíblia ilustrada (4 books, 2007)
- A leitura infinita. Bíblia e interpretação (essay, 2008)
- O Viajante sem sono (poetry, 2009)
- Histórias escolhidas da Bíblia (2009)
- O tesouro escondido (essay, 2011)
- Um deus que dança (prayers, 2011)
- Pai-nosso que estais na terra (essay, 2011)
- Nenhum caminho será longo (essay, 2012)
- O hipopótamo de Deus (essay, 2013)
- Os rostos de Jesus (2013)
- A papoila e o monge (poetry, 2013)
- O estado do bosque (play, 2013)
- A mística do instante (essay, 2014)
- A leitura infinita (essay, 2014)
- Estação central (poetry, 2015)
- Que coisa são as nuvens (a selection of the best stories published by the weekly Expresso, 2015)
- Esperar contra toda a esperança (essay, 2015)
- Desporto, ética e transcendência (essay, 2015)
- A construção de Jesus (essay, 2015)
- Corrigir os que erram (essay, 2016)
- Teoria da fronteira (poetry, 2017)
- Libertar o tempo. Para uma arte espiritual do presente (essay, 2017)
- O pequeno caminho das grandes perguntas (essay, 2017)
- Elogio da sede (essays delivered at the Lenten retreat preached before the pope and the Roman Curia, 2018)
- Requiem pela Aurora de Amanhã (libretto for a work composed by João Madureira marking the centenary of the end of World War I; it premiered on 20 July 2018 in the Jerónimos Monastery in Belém.)
- Nos passos de Etty Hillesum, with co-editor Filipe Condado (photos), (photobiography, 2019)
- Uma Beleza que nos Pertence (Aforismos) (essay, 2019)
- Palavra e Vida 2020 O Evangelho comentado cada dia(commentary of each daily gospel of the year, 2019)
- O que é amar um país (essay, 2020)
- Rezar de olhos abertos (prayers, 2020)
- Introdução a pintura rupestre (poetry, 2021)
- A questão sobre Deus e o não saber (co-written with the architect Álvaro Siza Vieira) (essay, 2022)
- Metamorfose necessária (Reler São Paulo) (essay, 2022)
- O Centro da Terra (poetry, 2024)
- A vida em nós (Aforismos) (essay, 2024)

=== in English ===
- Hidden Treasure: The Art of Searching Within (Alba House, 2014)
- Our Father who Art on Earth: The Lord's Prayer for Believers and Unbelievers (Paulist Press, 2013)
- No Journey Will Be Too Long: Friendship in Christian Life (Paulist Press, 2015)
- Religion and Culture in the Process of Global Change: Portuguese Perspectives, with co-editors Alfredo Teixeira, Alexandre Palma (Cultural Heritage and Contemporary Change, Series VIII, Vol. 19, Council for Research in Values & Philosophy, 2016)
- Jesus and the Woman: Revealing God's Mercy (Paulist Press, 2017)
- Thirst: Our Desire for God, God's Desire for Us (Paulist Press, 2019), retreat preached before the Pope and the Roman Curia during Lent 2018

== Honours and awards ==
=== Honours ===
- Commander of the Order of Prince Henry, 28 June 2001
- Commander of the Military Order of Saint James of the Sword, 4 December 2015
- Medal of Merit of the Autonomous Region of Madeira, 14 November 2019.
- On 27 March 2024, the Lisbon City Council unanimously decides to award the Medal of Honour of the City of Lisbon to Cardinal Tolentino de Mendonça, a Portuguese personality of universal expression, with recognized contributions to peace and development
- On 19 June 2024, in Lisbon, on the occasion of the presentation of the Pessoa 2023 Prize, awarded to Cardinal Tolentino de Mendonça on 14 December 2023, the President of the Portuguese Republic, Marcelo Rebelo de Sousa, presented him with the Grand Cross of the Military Order of Saint James of the Sword.

=== Coat of Arms ===
Coat of arms of Cardinal Tolentino de Mendonça
Adopted 5 October 2019 Coronet Galero of a Cardinal of the Catholic Church Escutcheon Gules, an Lilium Or Supporters Patriarchal cross Motto Considerate lilia agri - Mt 6,28 (Latin for "Consider the lilies of the field") Symbolism The lily alludes to Saint Joseph, the source of the Cardinal's given name. Previous versions When made an archbishop in 2018, Tolentino de Mendonça adopted a more complex coat of arms. Party per pall: the first Gules, an Elephant forcené Or; the second Or, a Lilium proper; the third Argent, an open Book proper bound Gules with the Greek letter Α on the dexter page and the Greek letter Ω on the sinister page both Gules.

=== Awards ===
- Laureate of Prémio Cidade de Lisboa de Poesia (1998)
- PEN Clube Português Award (2005)
- Inês de Castro Foundation Literary Award (2009)
- Finalist of the Casino da Póvoa Literary Award (2011)
- Finalist of the Casino da Póvoa Literary Award (2015)
- Literary Award Res Magnae (Italy, 2015)
- Grand Award APE/CM of Loulé - for "Que coisa são as nuvens" (2016)
- Grande Poetry Award Teixeira de Pascoaes (2016) for "A noite abre os meus olhos"
- Capri-San Michele Special Award (Italy, 2017)
- A life of ... passion Award (Italy, Avvenire, 2018)
- Co-winner of the "Cassidorio il Grande" Prize (Italy, 2019)
- Winner of Basilicata Award for spiritual literature and religious poetry (Italy, 2021)
- "2022 D. Dinis Award" granted by the Casa de Mateus Foundation for "Introdução à pintura rupestre" (2023)
- "2023 Francisco de Sá de Miranda Literature Award" for "Introdução à pintura rupestre" (2023)
- "2023 LericiPea poetry Award" (Italy) for his work as a whole.
- On 11 April 2025, Cardinal Tolentino de Mendonça won the 21st edition of the Eduardo Lourenço Prize by unanimous decision of the jury. The prize recognises the cardinal's contribution to contemporary Portuguese culture and his role as an intellectual, humanist and poet.

=== Other honours ===
- Top 100 Most Influential Portuguese of 2012 by Expresso magazine (2012)
- In June 2019, the weekly magazine of Expresso included de Mendonça on its list of the fifty "mighty, influent, innovative, provocative and eminent people who marked our life during the past year".
- The editorial team at Expresso chose de Mendonça as their Portuguese personality of the year for 2019.
- January 2020: de Mendonça is part of the scientific commission for the 700th anniversary of Dante Alighieri's death (1265-1321) chaired by Cardinal Gianfranco Ravasi. An initiative organized by the Pontifical Council for Culture.
- University of Coimbra Award (2021)
- The President of the Portuguese Republic, Marcelo Rebelo de Sousa, chooses Tolentino de Mendonça to preside over the ceremony marking Portugal Day of 10 June 2020, the Day of Portugal, Camões and the Portuguese Communities, at the Jerónimos Monastery in Western Lisbon.
- On 14 December 2021 Cardinal D. José Tolentino de Mendonça becomes an honorary member of the Portuguese Naval Academy in a ceremony presided over by the President of the Portuguese Republic, Marcelo Rebelo de Sousa
- On 18 December 2022 the Cardinal wins the first edition of the Ilídio Pinho Grand Prize in a ceremony presided over by the President of the Portuguese Republic, Marcelo Rebelo de Sousa. The prize aims to honour personalities dedicated to the "promotion and defence of the universal values of portugality".
- On 14 December 2023, the cardinal receives the Pessoa Prize, an initiative of the weekly magazine Expresso and the Caixa Geral de Depósitos to recognise the activities of living Portuguese people who have played a significant role in the country's cultural and scientific life.
- On 15 December 2023, the University of Aveiro (Portugal) awarded an honorary degree to cardinal Tolentino de Mendonça for his global vision of the world and his ability to bring a cultural dimension to the discussion of the problems of our time
- On 25 January 2024, the Catholic University of Pernambuco (Unicap) in Brazil confers the title of Doctor Honoris Causa to Cardinal Tolentino de Mendonça, who has been known there since 2009: an itinerant professor, he has given courses and lectures there, and presented several of his books when they were published in Brazil.
- On 22 August 2024, the Catholic University of Argentina awarded an honorary degree to cardinal Tolentino de Mendonça for his important ecclesiastical and academic work, his priestly and human pastoral activities, as well as his significant contribution to the fields of science, the arts, culture and education.

== See also ==
- Cardinals created by Francis

Catholic Church titles
Preceded by Jean-Louis Bruguès	Archivist of the Vatican Secret Archive; 1 September 2018 – 22 October 2019	Succeeded by Archives renamed
Preceded by Archives renamed	Librarian of the Holy Roman Church; 1 September 2018 – 26 September 2022	Succeeded by Angelo Vincenzo Zani
Preceded by Jean-Louis Bruguès	Archivist of the Vatican Apostolic Archive; 22 October 2019 – 26 September 2022	Succeeded by Angelo Vincenzo Zani
Preceded by Georges Cottier	Cardinal-Deacon of Santi Domenico e Sisto; 5 October 2019 –	Incumbent
New title	Prefect of the Dicastery for Culture and Education; 26 September 2022 –	Incumbent
