= Giuseppe Marchi =

Italian Jesuit archæologist

Giuseppe Marchi (22 February 1795, Tolmezzo – 10 February 1860, Rome) was an Italian Jesuit archæologist who worked on the Catacombs of Rome.

== Life ==
He entered the Society of Jesus in Rome on 12 November 1814, shortly after the re-establishment of the order, and was professor of humanities successively in the colleges of Terni, Reggio Emilia, Modena and St. Andrew of the Quirinal. After completing his course and making his religious profession (1833), he became professor of rhetoric in the Roman College and held this position until 1842. Meanwhile, he devoted his leisure to study, applying himself through choice to non-Christian antiquities.

He soon gave special attention to Christian antiquities, hoping thus to find a means of restoring Christian art. In 1838, he was made prefect of the Kircherian Museum, a position he retained until his death. Marchi attempted a reorganization of the collection and produced a monograph on the ancient coins preserved there, the Aes grave del Museo Kircheriano.

In 1840, he announced his intention of collecting into one large publication the monuments of Christian architecture, painting, and sculpture. His archæological pursuits recommended him to Gregory XVI as qualified to succeed Settele in the position of Conservatore dei sacri cimiteni di Roma (1842), charged with supervising the early Christian burial places in and around the city. He brought to the study of early Christian monuments a new scholarly rigour. About this time, Marchi made the acquaintance of youthful Giovanni Battista De Rossi, who accepted him as master and thenceforth accompanied him on his visits to the Roman catacombs. Art historian Raffaele Garrucci was also one of Marchi's associates.

These ancient cemeteries had been abandoned but thereafter were more accessible and could be studied on the ground. In spring 1842, Marchi conducted a tour of the Catacombs of Saint Agnes for James Roosevelt Bayley, John Bede Polding, and a number of people from the English College, Rome. In 1844, Marchi published the first volume of his "Monumenti", devoted to the construction of the catacombs, especially that of Saint Agnes. He proved the Christian origin of these ancient burial-places and, through his studies, brought about (21 March 1845) the discovery of the crypts of Saints Peter and Hyacinth in the catacomb of St. Hermes.

It was De Rossi who made the great discoveries in the catacombs. He knew better than Marchi how to make use of ancient topographical data and all the resources of learning. Marchi was appointed Consultor of the Congregation of the Index in 1847, and several years later (1854), he took part in the creation of the Lateran Museum. Marchi was assigned the work of collecting and arranging the sculptured monuments of the early Christian ages, and to de Rossi all that concerned ancient Christian inscriptions. In July 1855, his labours were interrupted for the first time by a stroke of apoplexy, to which he succumbed in 1860.

The notes intended for the continuation of the "Monumenti" were lost, but some of them were found by Giuseppe Bonavenia and made known at the Second Congress of Christian Archæology at Rome (1900). These recovered documents were destined for the second volume of the "Monumenti", which was to treat of the non-cemeterial Christian architecture of Rome.

== Published works ==
- Musei Kircherniani Inscriptiones ethnicæ et christianæ (Milan, 1837);
- L'aes grave del Museo Kircheriano, ovvero le monete primitive dei popoli dell' Italia media in collaboration with P. Tessieni (Rome, 1839);
- Monumenti delle arti cristane primitive nella metropoli del cristianesimo: I. Archittetura della Roma sotteranea cristiana (Rome, 1844).

== See also ==
Pontifical Commission of Sacred Archaeology
