= Pontifical Commission for Sacred Archaeology =

Board of the Vatican

The Pontifical Commission of Sacred Archaeology (Italian: Pontificia Commissione di Archeologia Sacra) is an official board of the Vatican founded in 1852 by Pope Pius IX for the purpose of promoting and directing excavations in the Catacombs of Rome and on other sites of Christian antiquarian interest, and of safeguarding the objects found during such excavations. In 1925, Pope Pius XI declared that the Commission was Pontifical and its competencies were defined in detail and reaffirmed recently in the conventions between the Holy See and the Italian State.

== Background ==
At that period Giovanni Battista De Rossi, a pupil of the archæologist Giuseppe Marchi, had already begun the investigation of subterranean Rome. He achieved results which, if confirmed, promised a rich reward. In a vineyard on the Appian Way he discovered (1849) a fragment of a marble slab bearing part of an inscription, "NELIVS. MARTYR", which he recognized as belonging to the sepulchre of Pope Cornelius, slain in 253, whose remains were laid to rest in the Catacomb of St. Callixtus on the Appian Way. Concluding that the vineyard in which the marble fragment was found overlay this Catacomb, he urged Pius IX to purchase the vineyard in order that excavations be made there.

The Pope, after listening to the representations of the young Rossi, said: "These are but the dreams of an archæologist"; and he added that he had works of more importance on which to spend his money. Nevertheless, he ordered the purchase to be made, and he allotted an annual revenue of 18,000 francs to be applied for excavations and future discoveries. The Commission of Sacred Archæology was then appointed to superintend the application of this fund to work in the Catacombs and elsewhere. The first meeting of this commission was held in Rome at 1851, at the residence of Cardinal Costantino Patrizi Naro, who presided over it by virtue of his office, and selected its members, first amongst them being the Pope's Sacristan, Giuseppe Maria Castellani, whose office up till then included that of the preservation of sacred relics. The first members were Vincenzo Tizzani, a professor of history in the Roman University; Marino Marini, Canon of St. Peter's; Giuseppe Marchi; and Giovanni Battista de Rossi.

The work achieved under its direction has included the formation of the Pio Cristiano Museum; large-scale excavations and repairs in the Catacombs; the discovery and opening up of several subterranean chapels of third-century popes, of Cecilia, of the Acilii-Glabriones, and the Cappella Greca; the opening up of many Catacombs now accessible to visitors; the publication of the three volumes of De Rossi's Roma Sotteranea and his Bulletin of Christian Archæology, and many other works of a kindred nature. Under its auspices the Collegium Cultorum Martyrum, or "Association for Venerating the Martyrs in the Catacombs", and the "Conferences of Christian Archæology", were created. It also furnished financial assistance for the excavations made beneath the ancient Roman Churches of San Clemente and Sts. John and Paul, which brought to light underground churches long lost to sight and memory.

In November 2013, the board announced physical and virtual visits to the newly excavated Catacomb of Priscilla in Rome.

== Management ==
In 2025, the president of the Pontifical Commission for Sacred Archaeology is Gianfranco Ravasi and the superintendent is Fabrizio Bisconti.

The Pontifical Academy of Archaeology and the Pontifical Institute for Christian Archaeology operate under its guidance.

== Presidents of the Pontifical Commission ==
- Francesco Marchisano (4 September 1991 – 28 August 2004)
- Mauro Piacenza (28 August 2004 – 7 May 2007)
- Gianfranco Ravasi (3 September 2007 – present)

== See also ==
- Pio Cristiano Museum
- Pontifical Commission
