= Paul Tighe =

Irish prelate of the Catholic Church (born 1958)

The Most Reverend Paul Tighe
- Secretary of the Section of Culture of the Dicastery for Culture and Education; Titular Bishop of Drivastum
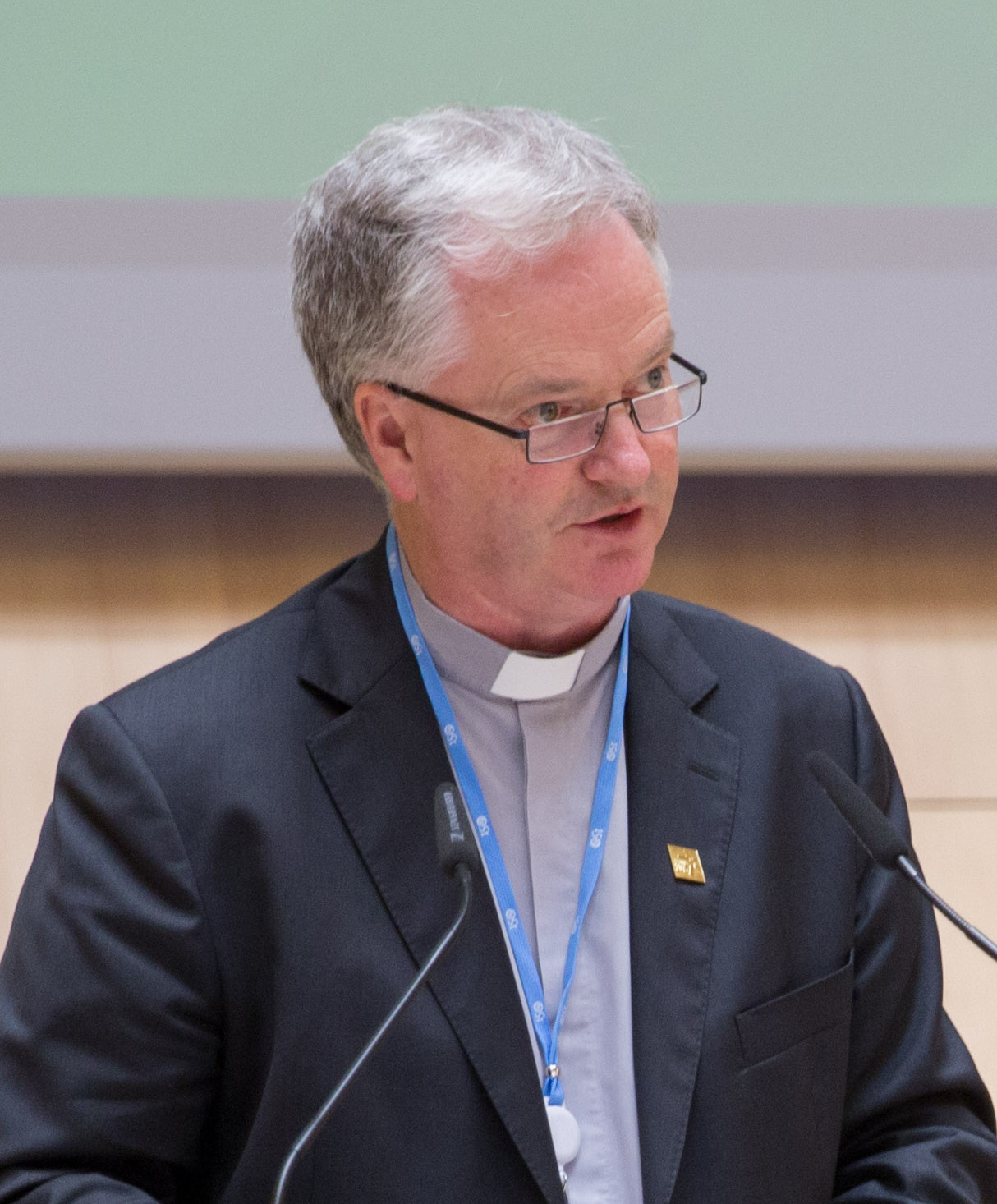
- Tighe in 2015
- Church: Roman Catholic
- Appointed: 5 June 2022
- Previous posts: Secretary and Adjunct Secretary of the Pontifical Council for Culture; Secretary of the Pontifical Council for Social Communications; Head of Theology at Mater Dei Institute of Education

Orders
- Ordination: 10 July 1983 by Brendan Comiskey
- Consecration: 27 February 2016 by Pietro Parolin

Personal details
- Born: 12 February 1958 (age 68) Navan, County Meath, Ireland
- Parents: Macartan and Monica Tighe
- Education: Pontifical Irish College; Pontifical Gregorian University; Holy Cross College; University College Dublin; Mater Dei Institute of Education
- Motto: Estote factores Verbi (Be doers of the word)

Styles of Paul Tighe
- Reference style: The Most Reverend
- Spoken style: Your Grace
- Religious style: Bishop

Paul Desmond Tighe (born 12 February 1958) is an Irish Catholic prelate who has served as Secretary of the Section of Culture of the Dicastery for Culture and Education since 2022. He was appointed Titular Bishop of Drivastum by Pope Francis in 2016.

== Early life and education ==
Tighe was born in Navan, County Meath, on 12 February 1958, one of six children to Macartan Tighe and his wife Monica (née Johnson). He attended primary school at Loreto Convent and De La Salle Primary Schools and secondary school at St Patrick's Classical School and Summerhill College.

Tighe undertook foundational studies in theology at Mater Dei Institute of Education, before completing a Bachelor of Civil Law from University College Dublin in 1979. He subsequently completed undergraduate studies in philosophy at Holy Cross College and theology at the Pontifical Gregorian University and the Pontifical Irish College.

Tighe was ordained a priest for the Archdiocese of Dublin on 10 July 1983.

== Presbyteral ministry ==
Following ordination, Tighe's first pastoral assignment was as parish chaplain in Our Lady of the Assumption parish, Ballyfermot, and priest and teacher at Ballyfermot Senior College. He returned to Rome in 1984 to undertake postgraduate studies in moral theology, before returning to the Archdiocese of Dublin in 1990, where he was appointed lecturer of moral theology at Mater Dei Institute of Education, specialising in bioethics, and lecturer of moral theology and ethics at Holy Cross College.

Tighe was subsequently appointed head of the theology department in Mater Dei Institute of Education in 2000. He also served as parish chaplain in Rathmines between 1999 and 2004, and in Cabra in 2004.

Tighe became a member of the archdiocesan communications advisory committee in 2001, before being appointed director of the archdiocesan communications office in 2004. During his directorship, he managed the restructuring of the communications office and established its Office for Public Affairs, which aids communication between the archdiocese and governmental and non-governmental organisations in Ireland and Europe, in 2005.

Tighe was appointed Chaplain of His Holiness by Pope Benedict XVI in January 2007, and subsequently secretary of the Pontifical Council for Social Communications on 30 November. He was appointed Prelate of Honour of His Holiness in January 2008.

In an article for the Australian Broadcasting Corporation (ABC) in 2012, he wrote about the challenges faced by the Catholic Church in finding a language appropriate for a digital age:

"The generalized and uncritical social reception of the tenets of relativism finds particular expression in the digital world where the sheer volume of information and opinion, much of it contradictory, can lead to an almost resigned acceptance that it is meaningless to speak of truth and objectivity. In the face of so much assertion, argument and counter argument, it is difficult to decide where real authority and expertise resides."

Tighe was appointed secretary of the Committee for the Reform for the Vatican Media, a special commission led by Chris Patten tasked with reforming the media relations of the Holy See, by Pope Francis on 9 July 2014. He was subsequently appointed to the Committee for Vatican Media, and upon the conclusion of its work, he presented the findings of the Committee for the Reform of Vatican Media to Pope Francis and the Council of Cardinals.

== Episcopal ministry ==
Tighe was appointed adjunct secretary of the Pontifical Council for Culture and titular bishop-elect of Drivastum by Pope Francis on 19 December 2015. He was consecrated by the Cardinal Secretary of State, Pietro Parolin, on 27 February 2016, and subsequently appointed secretary of the Pontifical Council for Culture on 28 October 2017.

While participating in a panel discussion with other spokespersons from Catholic organisations at South by Southwest on 12 March 2017, Tighe spoke of the Church as a "recognisable brand". The panel discussion was one of the first attempts by festival organisers to address the role of faith in secular discourse.

He was appointed secretary of the Pontifical Council for Culture on 28 October 2017, and subsequently to the Dicastery for Bishops on 13 July 2022.

After the entry into force of the apostolic constitution Praedicate evangelium on 5 June 2022, Tighe became secretary of the Section for Culture of the Dicastery for Culture and Education.

Catholic Church titles
Preceded by Renato Boccardo	Secretary of the Pontifical Council for Social Communications; 2007–2015	Succeeded by none, dicastery dissolved
Preceded by Barthélemy Adoukonou	Secretary of the Pontifical Council for Culture; 2017–2022	Succeeded by none, dicastery merged
Preceded by none, dicastery created	Secretary of the Section of Culture of the Dicastery for Culture and Education since 2022	Succeeded by incumbent
