= Dicastery for Culture and Education =

Administrative unit of the Roman Curia for education

- Dicasterium de cultura et educatione
- Coat of arms of the Holy See

Dicastery overview
- Formed: June 5, 2022; 4 years ago
- Preceding agencies: Pontifical Council for Culture; Congregation for Catholic Education
- Type: Dicastery
- Headquarters: Piazza Pio XII, 3, 00120 Vatican City
- Dicastery executives: Cardinal José Tolentino de Mendonça, Prefect; Paul Desmond Tighe, Secretary (Culture Section); Carlo Maria Polvani, Secretary; Antonino Spadaro, Under-Secretary; Matthias Ambros, Under-Secretary
- Website: www.dce.va/it.html

The Dicastery for Culture and Education is an administrative unit of the Roman Curia. It began operations on 5 June 2022 as established by the apostolic constitution Praedicate evangelium promulgated on 19 March 2022. It was formed through the merger of two earlier bodies, the Pontifical Council for Culture and the Congregation for Catholic Education.

At the time of the merger, each of these bodies was headed by a cardinal of retirement age: Gianfranco Ravasi as president of the Council for Culture and Giuseppe Versaldi as prefect of the Congregation for Education. Speculation that the new dicastery would be led by someone else, possibly even a lay person, proved partly correct when Cardinal José Tolentino de Mendonça was named prefect of the new dicastery in September 2022.

== Organization ==
This dicastery is divided into two sections that reflect both the name of the dicastery and the organizations merged to form it: the Section for Culture "dedicated to the promotion of culture, pastoral activity and the enhancement of cultural heritage", and the Section for Education, which "develops the fundamental principles of education regarding schools, Catholic and ecclesiastical institutes of higher education and research". The Dicastery also has responsibility for coordinating the work of other institutions: the Pontifical Academy for Fine Arts and Letters of the Virtuosi at the Pantheon; the Pontifical Roman Academy of Archeology; the Pontifical Academy of Theology; the Pontifical Academy of Saint Thomas Aquinas; the Pontifical International Marian Academy; the Pontifical Academy Cultorum Martyrum; and the Pontifical Academy for Latin.

=== Section for Culture ===
The Section for Culture promotes relationships between the Holy See and the world of culture, favoring dialogue to foster mutual enrichment, "so that lovers of the arts, literature, the sciences, technology and sport ... feel recognized by the Church as people at the service of a sincere search for the true, the good and the beautiful". It helps bishops and conferences of bishops protect and preserve their historical heritage to be made available to all those interested. It encourages dialogue between the multiple cultures present within the Church.

It assists the research programs of Church institutions and participates as appropriate in efforts to promote culture on the part of nations and international bodies. It promotes dialogue with those who profess no religion but "seek an encounter with God's truth". (Note: The inclusion of encountering non-believers reflects the earlier history of organization of Curial departments. In March 1993, Pope John Paul II merged the Pontifical Council for Dialogue with Non-Believers, created by Pope Paul VI as a secretariat in 1965 and renamed a pontifical council in 1988, into the Pontifical Council for Culture.)

=== Section for Education ===
The Section for Education collaborates with bishops and regional conferences of bishops to establish and promote the fundamental principles to be "implemented contextually and culturally". It issues norms that define the criteria for Catholic education in a particular cultural context, and it "ensures that the integrity of the Catholic faith is safeguarded in doctrinal teaching". It promotes the teaching of the Catholic religion in schools.

It promotes the development of Catholic higher education institutes to form students for their role in the Church and in society. It promotes the recognition by other nations of degrees granted by the Holy See. It approves the statutes of ecclesiastical academic institutions and supervises their relations with civil authorities. It promotes cooperation between ecclesiastical and Catholic higher education institutes and their associations.

== Leadership ==
Prefects:

- Cardinal José Tolentino Calaça de Mendonça (26 September 2022 – present)

Secretaries:

- Archbishop Carlo Maria Polvani
- Archbishop Paul Tighe (Culture Section)
