= Pontifical Academy of Archaeology =

The Pontifical Academy of Archaeology (Pontificia Accademia Romana di Archeologia) is an academic honorary society established in Rome by the Catholic Church for the advancement of Christian archaeological study. It is one of the ten such Pontifical Academies established by the Holy See.

== History ==
In the 17th century, Pope Benedict XIV responded to public and Church interest in archaeology by establishing an association of students of Roman archaeology. Antonio Bosio's work on the catacombs had drawn the attention of international archaeologists to the early history of Christianity.

In 1816 Pius VII, on the recommendation of Cardinal Consalvi, gave official recognition to the Accademia Romana di Archeologia and the academy became an important international centre of archaeological study. Its foreign members and lecturers included Barthold Georg Niebuhr, Johan David Åkerblad, Bertel Thorvaldsen, as well as sovereigns Frederick William IV of Prussia and Charles Albert of Sardinia. Pope Pius VIII gave the Academy the title of "Pontifical Academy".

In 1833 an attempt was made to remove the tomb of Raphael, but the Academy protested to Pope Gregory XVI and was successful. Later through the efforts of one of its members, the Academy was responsible for the restoration of the Tabularium on the Capitoline Hill.

In the mid-19th century, the Academy became involved in a series of property rights disputes, as it hoped to prevent damage to monuments by restricting the rights of residents in low-cost housing near the Pantheon in Rome. It succeeded in obtaining from Pope Pius IX a decree for the demolition of the houses on the left side of the Pantheon; it also protested against the digging of new holes in the walls.

== Modern operations ==
The Academy operates with the guidance and direction of the Pontifical Commission of Sacred Archaeology.

The Camerlengo of the Holy Roman Church is the Academy's "protector" and overseer. It has a membership of 130 ordinary members, with further honorary, corresponding, and associate members. Its meetings are held in the palace of the Cancelleria Apostolica. The seal of the Academy represents the ruins of a classical temple, with the motto "In apricum proferet" - "It will bring to light."

In July 2010 the Academy celebrated its 200th anniversary.

With Pope Francis' reorganization of the Roman Curia as of 5 June 2022 as provided for in the apostolic constitution Praedicate evangelium, the new Dicastery for Culture and Education became responsible for coordinating the work of this Academy with its own work and that of a number of other bodies.

In 2024, the president of the academy is Maurizio Sannibale. He was appointed in 2021.

== Academy publications ==
- Leggi della Pontificia Accademia Romana di Archeologia (Rome, 1894)
- Omaggio al II Congresso Internazionale di Archeologia Cristiana in Roma (Rome, 1900)
- Bullettino di Archeologia Cristiana of Giovanni Battista De Rossi (to the end of 1894) passim
- Il Nuovo Bullettino di Archeologia Cristiana (Rome, 1894–1906)

== See also ==
- Global organisation of the Catholic Church
- Index of Vatican City-related articles
