= Raffaele Farina =

Italian cardinal

His Eminence Raffaele Farina SDB
- Archivist Emeritus of the Vatican Secret Archives
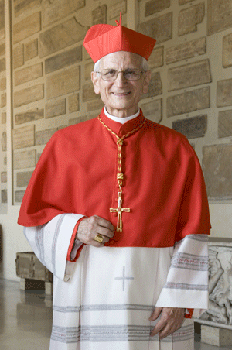
- Cardinal Farina
- Appointed: 25 June 2007
- Term ended: 9 June 2012
- Predecessor: Jean-Louis Tauran
- Other posts: Cardinal-Priest of S. Giovanni della Pigna "pro hac vice"; Librarian of the Vatican Library
- Previous posts: Prefect of the Vatican Library (1997–2007); Titular Bishop of Opitergium (2006–2007)

Orders
- Ordination: 1 July 1958 by Michele Alberto Arduino
- Consecration: 16 December 2006 by Tarcisio Bertone
- Created cardinal: 24 November 2007 by Pope Benedict XVI
- Rank: Cardinal-Deacon (2007-18); Cardinal-Priest (from 2018)

Personal details
- Born: Raffaele Farina; 24 September 1933 (age 92) Buonalbergo, Italy
- Denomination: Roman Catholic
- Motto: Dominus spes nostra
- Coat of arms

Styles of Raffaele Farina
- Reference style: His Eminence
- Spoken style: Your Eminence
- Informal style: Cardinal

Raffaele Farina SDB (born 24 September 1933) is an Italian cardinal of the Catholic Church. He was Archivist of the Vatican Secret Archives, Librarian of the Vatican Library, and president (Consiglio di Presidenza) of Scuola Vaticana di Paleografia, Diplomatica e Archivistica. Farina was elevated to the cardinalate in 2007.

== Early life ==
Born in Buonalbergo, Farina entered the Salesians of Don Bosco, more commonly known as the Salesians, at the novitiate of Portici Bellavista at the age of sixteen. He professed his simple (temporary) vows on 25 September 1949, and made his perpetual vows on 25 September 1954; one of his sisters is also a Salesian. Farina began his studies in theology at the Pontifical Salesian Athenaeum of Turin in 1954 as well, obtaining his licentiate in theology from the Athenaeum in 1958. He was ordained to the priesthood by Bishop Michele Alberto Arduino SDB, on 1 July 1958.

Farina later studied ecclesiastical history at the Pontifical Gregorian University in Rome, and received his doctorate in 1965. For the following three years, he worked on his specialization at the German Foundation "Humboldt" in Freiburg and Bonn.

From 1968 to 1972, he was professor of the history of the Church (covering the origin to the fall of the Western Roman Empire in 476 AD) and of Methodology in the Theological Faculty of the Pontifical Salesian University; he then served as dean of the same faculty until 1974, and was rector of the university for two terms (1977–1983, 1992–1997). Farina was named regolatore of the XXI general chapter of his congregation in 1978.

== Curial appointments ==
From 1982 to 1986, he was Secretary of the Pontifical Committee of Historical Sciences, and was made Undersecretary of Pontifical Council for Culture within the Roman Curia in 1986. Named Prefect of the Vatican Library by Pope John Paul II on 25 May 1997, he was the second-highest official in that office, successively under Cardinals Luigi Poggi and Jean-Louis Tauran.

On 15 November 2006, Farina was appointed Titular Bishop of Opitergium by Pope Benedict XVI. He received his episcopal consecration on the following 16 December from three cardinals, fellow Salesian Tarcisio Bertone as principal consecrator, with James Stafford and Jean-Louis Tauran as co-consecrators, in St. Peter's Basilica. Farina was later named Archivist of the Vatican Secret Archives and Librarian of the Vatican Library on 25 June 2007, replacing Cardinal Tauran, who was made President of the Pontifical Council for Interreligious Dialogue. On the same date, he was given the rank of Archbishop.

Pope Benedict created him Cardinal-Deacon of San Giovanni della Pigna in the consistory of 24 November 2007.

On 12 June 2008, in addition to his main duties, he was appointed by Benedict as a member of congregations in the Roman Curia. These are: the Congregation for the Causes of Saints, Congregation for Catholic Education and the Pontifical Commission for the Cultural Heritage of the Church.

On 9 June 2012, he retired from posts of Archivist of the Vatican Secret Archives and Librarian of the Vatican Library.

Cardinal Farina currently sits on the Pontifical Academy of Sciences, and is also fluent in German, Spanish, Japanese, and French.

In August 2010, Farina said that Pope John Paul II declined then-Cardinal Ratzinger's request to spend his last years as the archivist and librarian of the Holy Roman Church. Farina recalled when he was appointed prefect of the Vatican Library in May 1997, having a brief meeting with Ratzinger in which he was asked his opinion of Ratzinger joining the team. Ratzinger asked the Pope if he could step down from his role when he turned 70 on 16 April 1997. "He was asking me what I thought of his idea and what being archivist and librarian of the Holy Roman Church involved", said Farina.

He was one of the cardinal electors who participated in the 2013 papal conclave that elected Pope Francis.

In June 2013 Pope Francis by chirograph named Cardinal Farina president of the five member Pontifical Commission investigating the Institute for the Works of Religion. The other members are, Cardinal Tauran, Peter Brian Wells, Bishop Juan Ignacio Arrieta Ochoa de Chinchetru who will act as Coordinator and Mary Ann Glendon.

== Honours ==
- Order of the Rising Sun, 2nd Class, Gold and Silver Star (2019)

Catholic Church titles
Preceded by Giuseppe G. Gamba SDB	Dean of the Faculty of Theology of the Salesian Pontifical University; 1973–1975	Succeeded by Mario Midali SDB
Preceded by Pietro Braido SDB	Rector of the Salesian Pontifical University; 1977–1983	Succeeded by Roberto Giannatelli SDB
Preceded by Amato Frutaz	Secretary of the Pontifical Committee of Historical Sciences; 1982–1986	Succeeded by Vittorino Grossi OSA
New title	Undersecretary of the Pontifical Council for Culture; 1986–1991	Succeeded by Bernard Ardura OPraem
Preceded by Angelo Amato SDB	Rector of the Salesian Pontifical University; 1991–1997	Succeeded by Michele Pellerey
Preceded by Leonard Eugene Boyle	Prefect of the Vatican Library; 1997–2007	Succeeded by Cesare Pasini
Preceded by Jean-Louis Tauran	Archivist of the Vatican Secret Archives; 2007–2012	Succeeded by Jean-Louis Bruguès
Preceded by Jean-Louis Tauran	Librarian of the Holy Roman Church; 2007–2012	Succeeded by Jean-Louis Bruguès
Preceded by Francis Arinze	Cardinal-Deacon of San Giovanni della Pigna; 2007–present	Incumbent
