= Vatican Film Library =

Film library In Rome

The Vatican Film Library is a film archive established in 1959 by Pope John XXIII. The collection comprises over 8,000 films including historic films, Church events, commercial films and documentaries.

It is to be distinguished from the Knights of Columbus Vatican Film Library at Saint Louis University.

== History ==
The Vatican Film Library was instituted by Pope John XXIII on November 16, 1959, with the aim of collecting and preserving films and recorded television programs on the life of the Catholic Church. It was initially entrusted to the then Pontifical Commission for Cinematography, which in 1964 became the Pontifical Commission for Social Communications and in 1988 the Pontifical Council for Social Communications. Today the Vatican Film Library is part of the Dicastery for Communication.

The library's projection hall hosted Pope John Paul II on several occasions, along with numerous directors presenting a preview of their works, including Liliana Cavani, Roberto Benigni, and Martin Scorsese.

== See also ==
- List of film archives
- Index of Vatican City-related articles
- Vatican Library
- The Vatican Splendors
- Vatican Secret Archives
- Archive of the Congregation for the Doctrine of the Faith
