= Vatican Library =

Library of the Holy See in Vatican City

Vatican Apostolic Library
- Bibliotheca Apostolica Vaticana

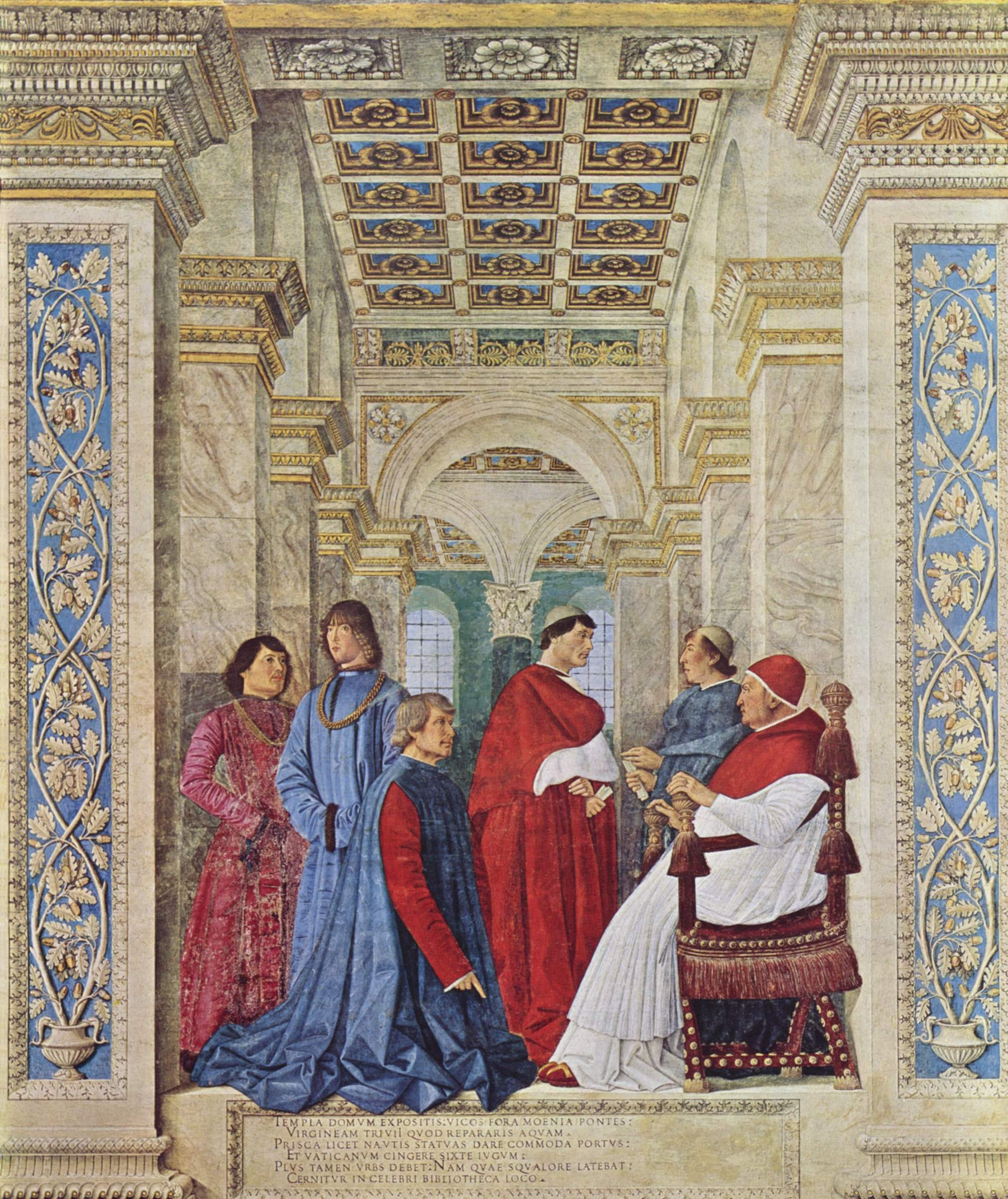
- Pope Sixtus IV Appoints Bartolomeo Platina Prefect of the Vatican Library, fresco by Melozzo da Forlì, 1477, now in the Vatican Museums
- Location on a map of Vatican City
- 41°54′17″N 12°27′16″E
- Location: Vatican City
- Type: Research library
- Established: 1475 (551 years ago)

Collection
- Size: 75,000 codices; 1.1 million printed books

Other information
- Director: Giovanni Cesare Pagazzi
- Website: vaticanlibrary.va

The Vatican Apostolic Library (Latin: Bibliotheca Apostolica Vaticana, Italian: Biblioteca Apostolica Vaticana), more commonly known as the Vatican Library or informally as the Vat, is the library of the Holy See, located in Vatican City, and is the city-state's national library. It was formally established by Pope Sixtus IV on June 15, 1475, by the papal bull Ad decorem militantis ecclesiae, although it is much older. It is one of the oldest libraries in the world and contains one of the most significant collections of historical texts. It has 75,000 codices from throughout history, as well as 1.1 million printed books, which include some 8,500 incunabula.

The Vatican Library is a research library for history, law, philosophy, science, and theology. The Vatican Library is open to anyone who can document their qualifications and research needs. Photocopies for private study of pages from books published between 1801 and 1990 can be requested in person or by mail.

Pope Nicholas V (1447–1455) envisioned a new Rome, with extensive public works to lure pilgrims and scholars to the city to begin its transformation. Nicolas wanted to create a "public library" for Rome that was meant to be seen as an institution for humanist scholarship. His death prevented him from carrying out his plan, but his successor Pope Sixtus IV (1471–1484) established what is now known as the Vatican Library.

In March 2014, the Vatican Library began an initial four-year project of digitising its collection of manuscripts, to be made available online.

The Vatican Apostolic Archive was separated from the library at the beginning of the 17th century; it contains another 150,000 items.

== Historical periods ==
Scholars have traditionally divided the history of the library into five periods: Pre-Lateran, Lateran, Avignon, Pre-Vatican and Vatican.

=== Pre-Lateran ===
The Pre-Lateran period, comprising the initial days of the library, dating from the earliest days of the Church. Only a handful of volumes survive from this period, though some are very significant.

=== At the Lateran ===
The Lateran era began when the library moved to the Lateran Palace and lasted until the end of the 13th century and the reign of Pope Boniface VIII, who died in 1303, by which time he possessed one of the most notable collections of illuminated manuscripts in Europe. However, in that year, the Lateran Palace was burnt and the collection plundered by Philip IV of France.

=== At Avignon ===
The Avignon period was during the Avignon Papacy, when seven successive popes resided in Avignon, France. This period saw great growth in book collection and record-keeping by the popes in Avignon, between the death of Boniface and the 1370s when the papacy returned to Rome.

=== Prior to establishment at the Vatican ===
The Pre-Vatican period ranged from about 1370 to 1447. The library was scattered during this time, with parts in Rome, Avignon, and elsewhere. Pope Eugenius IV possessed 340 books by the time of his death.

=== At the Vatican ===
In 1451, bibliophile Pope Nicholas V sought to establish a public library at the Vatican, in part to re-establish Rome as a destination for scholarship. Nicholas combined some 350 Greek, Latin and Hebrew codices inherited from his predecessors with his own collection and extensive acquisitions, among them manuscripts from the imperial Library of Constantinople. Pope Nicholas also expanded his collection by employing Italian and Byzantine scholars to translate the Greek classics into Latin for his library. The knowledgeable pope already encouraged the inclusion of pagan classics. Nicolas was important in saving many of the Greek works and writings during this time period that he had collected while travelling and acquired from others.

In 1455, the collection had grown to 1200 books, of which 400 were in Greek.

Nicholas died in 1455. In 1475 his successor Pope Sixtus IV founded the Palatine Library. During his papacy, acquisitions were made in "theology, philosophy and artistic literature". The number of manuscripts is variously counted as 3,500 in 1475 or 2,527 in 1481, when librarians Bartolomeo Platina and Pietro Demetrio Guazzelli produced a signed listing. At the time it was the largest collection of books in the Western world.

Pope Julius II commissioned the expansion of the building. Around 1587, Pope Sixtus V commissioned the architect Domenico Fontana to construct a new building for the library, which is still used today. After this, it became known as the Vatican Library.

During the Counter-Reformation, access to the library's collections was limited following the introduction of the Index of banned books. Scholars' access to the library was restricted, particularly Protestant scholars. Restrictions were lifted during the course of the 17th century, and Pope Leo XIII was to formally reopen the library to scholars in 1883.

In 1756, the priest Antonio Piaggio, curator of ancient manuscripts at the Library used a machine he had invented to unroll the first Herculaneum papyri, an operation which took him months.

In 1809, Napoleon Bonaparte arrested Pope Pius VII and had the contents of the library seized and removed to Paris. They were returned in 1817, three years after Napoleon's defeat and abdication.

The library's first major revitalization project took place in the period between the two World Wars at the instigation of Pope Pius XI, himself a scholar and former librarian, with the cooperation of librarians from around the world. Until this point in time, while it had drawn on the expertise of numerous experts, the Vatican Library was dangerously lacking in organization and its junior librarians were undertrained. Foreign researchers, particularly Americans, noticed how inadequate the facilities were for such an important collection. Several American organizations, including the American Library Association and the Carnegie Endowment for International Peace, offered to assist in implementing a modern cataloguing system. Along with this, librarians from the Vatican Library were invited to visit several libraries in the United States to receive training on the functioning of a modern library. They visited the Library of Congress, and libraries in Princeton, Philadelphia, Baltimore, Pittsburgh, Chicago, Champaign, Toronto, and Ann Arbor. Once back in Rome, a reorganization plan was implemented. The main goals were to create a summary index by author of each manuscript, and likewise a catalogue for the incunabula. Once the project was completed, the Vatican Library was one of the most modern in all of Europe. This joint effort highlighted the importance of international relationships in the field of librarianship and led to the founding in 1929 of the International Federation of Library Associations, still at work.

In 1992 the library had almost 2 million catalogued items.

Among a number of thefts from the Library committed in modern times, in 1995 art history teacher Anthony Melnikas from Ohio State University stole three leaves from a medieval manuscript once owned by Francesco Petrarch. One of the stolen leaves contains an exquisite miniature of a farmer threshing grain. A fourth leaf from an unknown source was also discovered in his possession by U.S. Customs agents. Melnikas was trying to sell the pages to an art dealer, who then alerted the library director.

== Location and building ==
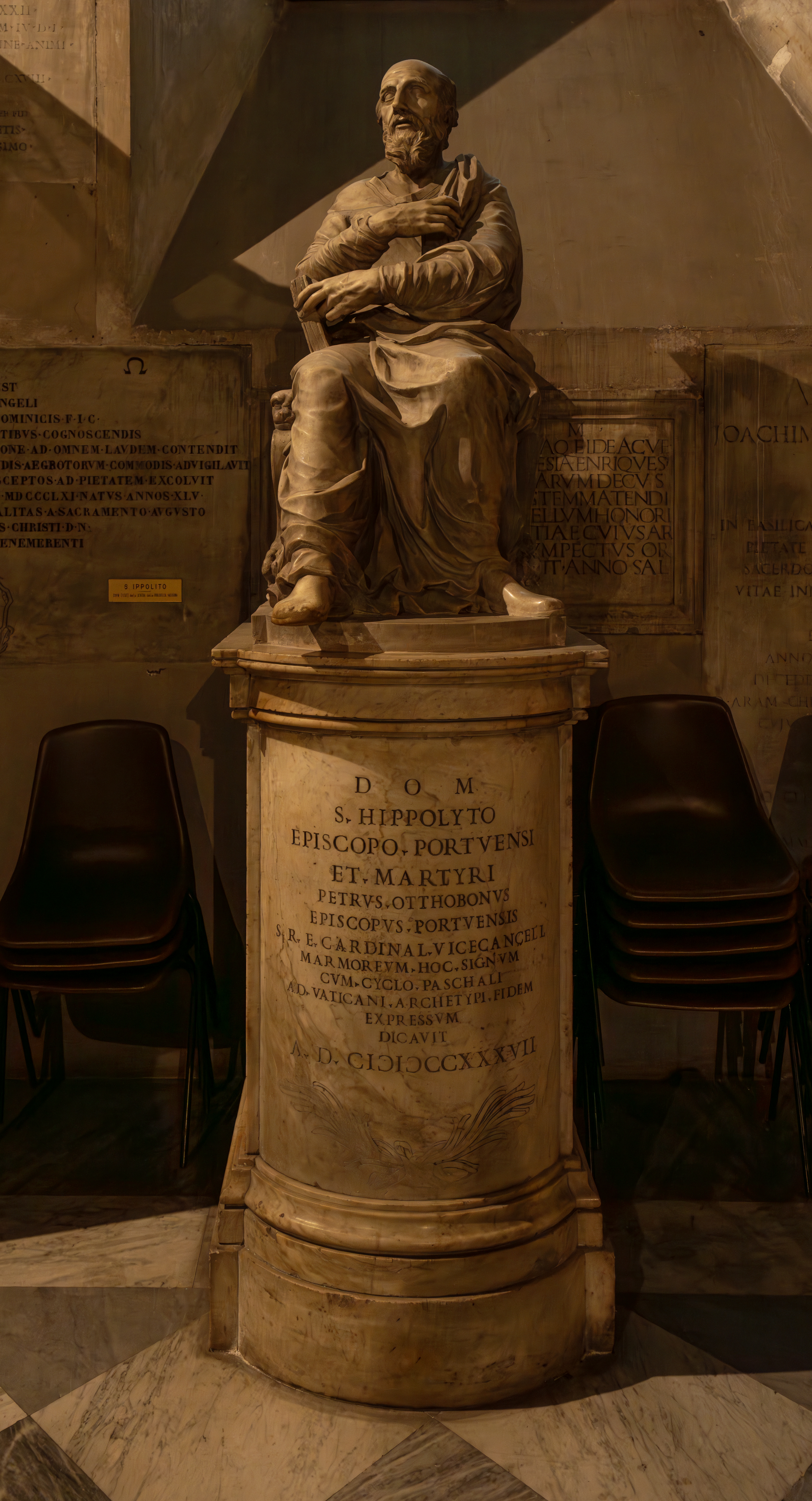
Ancient Roman sculpture, maybe of Saint Hippolytus of Rome, found in 1551 at Via Tiburtina, Rome, and now at the Vatican Library

The library is located inside the Vatican Palace, and the entrance is through the Belvedere Courtyard. When Pope Sixtus V (1585–1590) commissioned the expansion and the new building of the Vatican Library, he had a three-story wing built right across Bramante's Cortile del Belvedere, thus bisecting it and changing Bramante's work significantly. At the bottom of a grand staircase, a large statue of Hippolytus decorates the La Galea entrance hall.

In the first semi-basement there is a papyrus room and a storage area for manuscripts. The first floor houses the restoration laboratory, and the photographic archives are on the second floor.

The library has 42 kilometres (26 mi) of shelving.

The library closed for renovations on 17 July 2007 and reopened on 20 September 2010. The three-year, 9 million euro renovation involved the complete shut down of the library to install climate controlled rooms.

=== Architecture and art ===
In the Sala di Consultazione or main reference room of the Vatican Library looms a statue of St Thomas Aquinas (c. 1910), sculpted by Cesare Aureli. A second version of this statue (c. 1930) stands under the entrance portico of the Pontifical University of St Thomas Aquinas, Angelicum. (Note: This sculpture is described in the following words: "S. Tommaso seduto, nella sinistra tiene il libro della Summa theologica, mentre stende la destra in atto di proteggere la scienza cristiana. Quindi non siede sulla cattedra di dottore, ma sul trono di sovrano protettore; stende il braccio a rassicurare, non a dimostrare. Ha in testa il dottorale berretto, e conservando il suo tipo tradizionale, rivela nel volto e nell'atteggiamento l'uomo profondamente dotto. L'autore non ha avuto da ispirarsi in altr'opera che esistesse sul soggetto, quindi ha dovuto, può dirsi, creare questo tipo, ed è riuscito originale e felice nella sua creazione.")

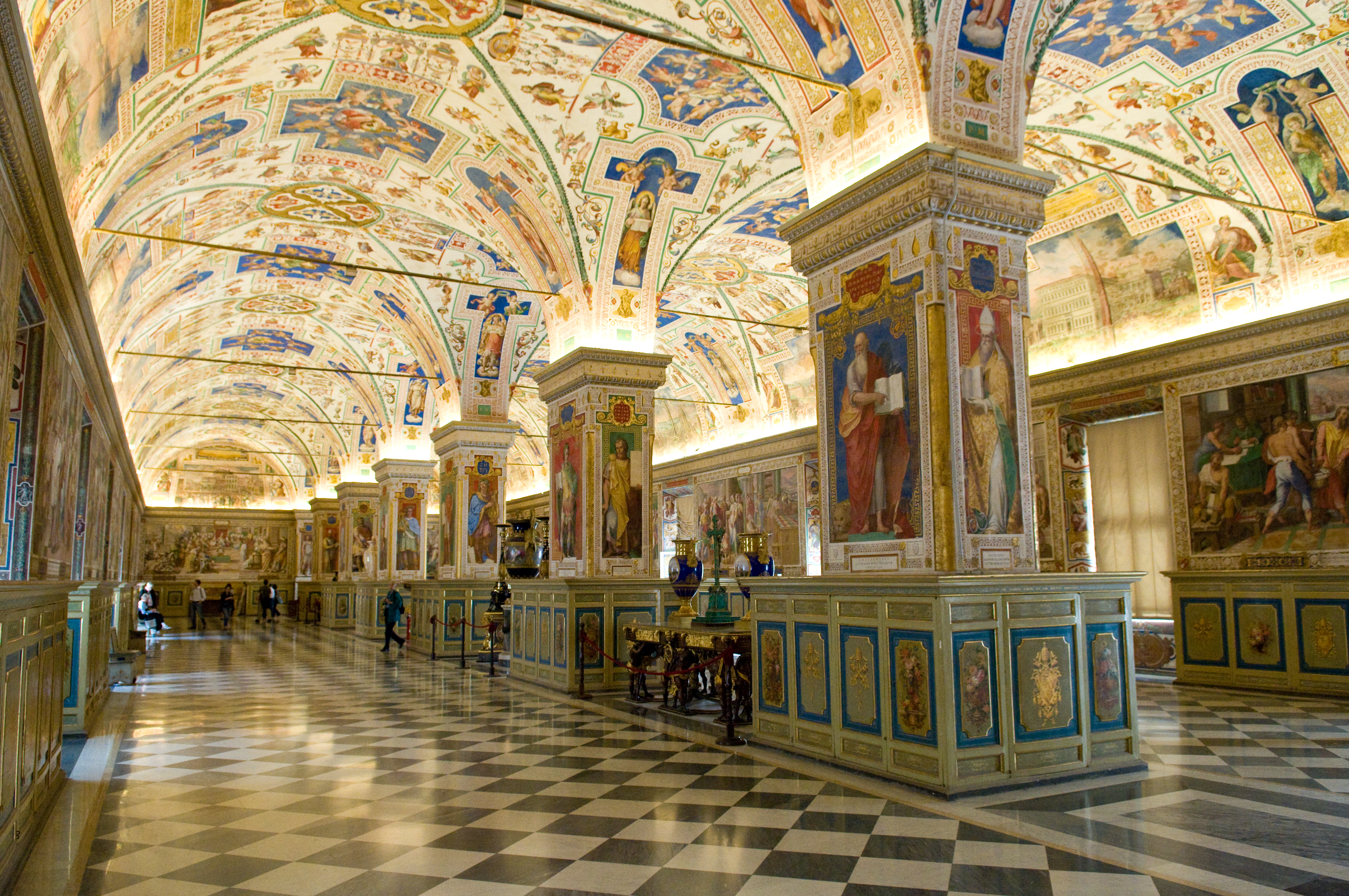
The Sistine Hall of the Vatican Library

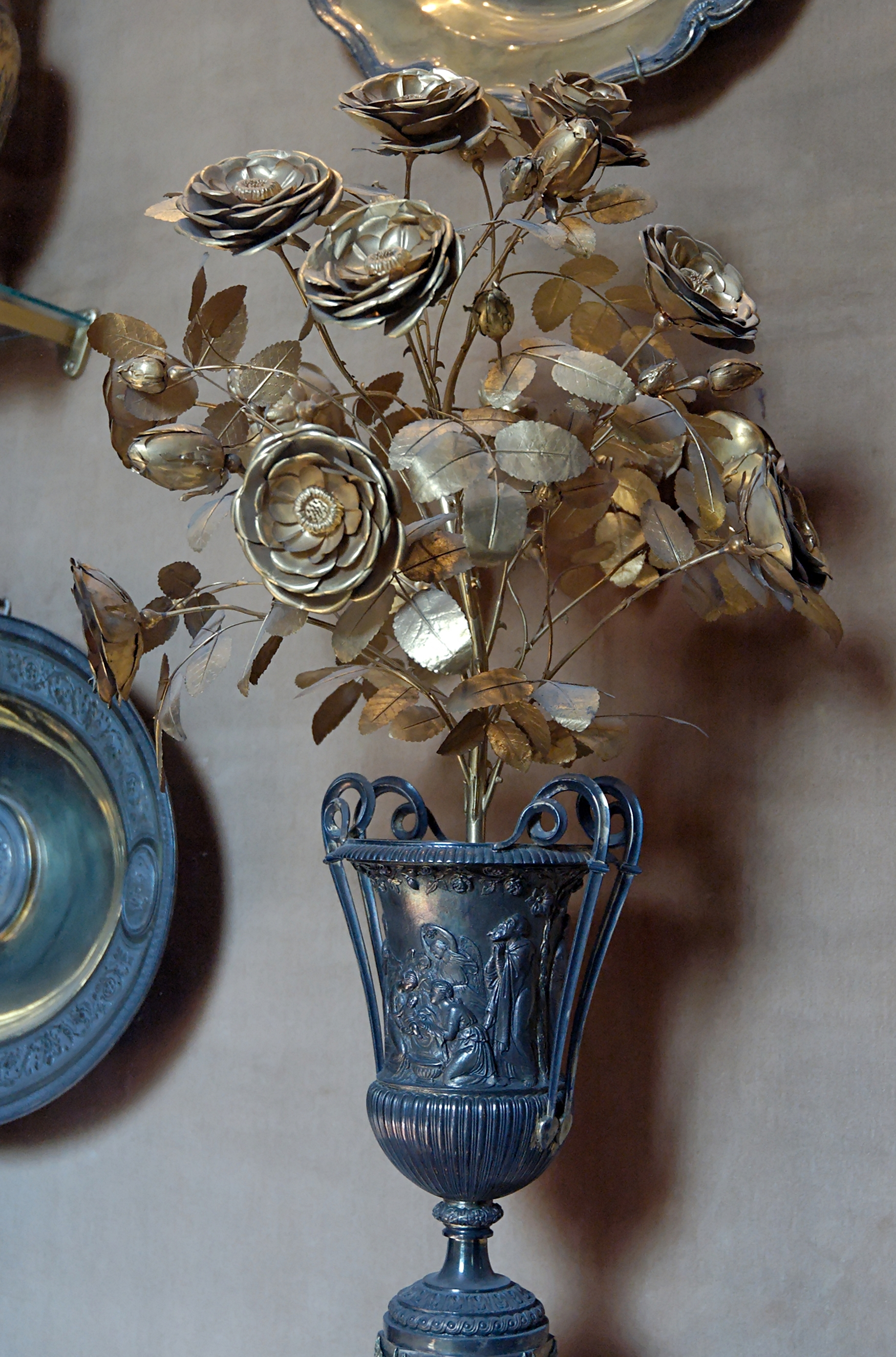
Golden Rose stored in the Vatican Library

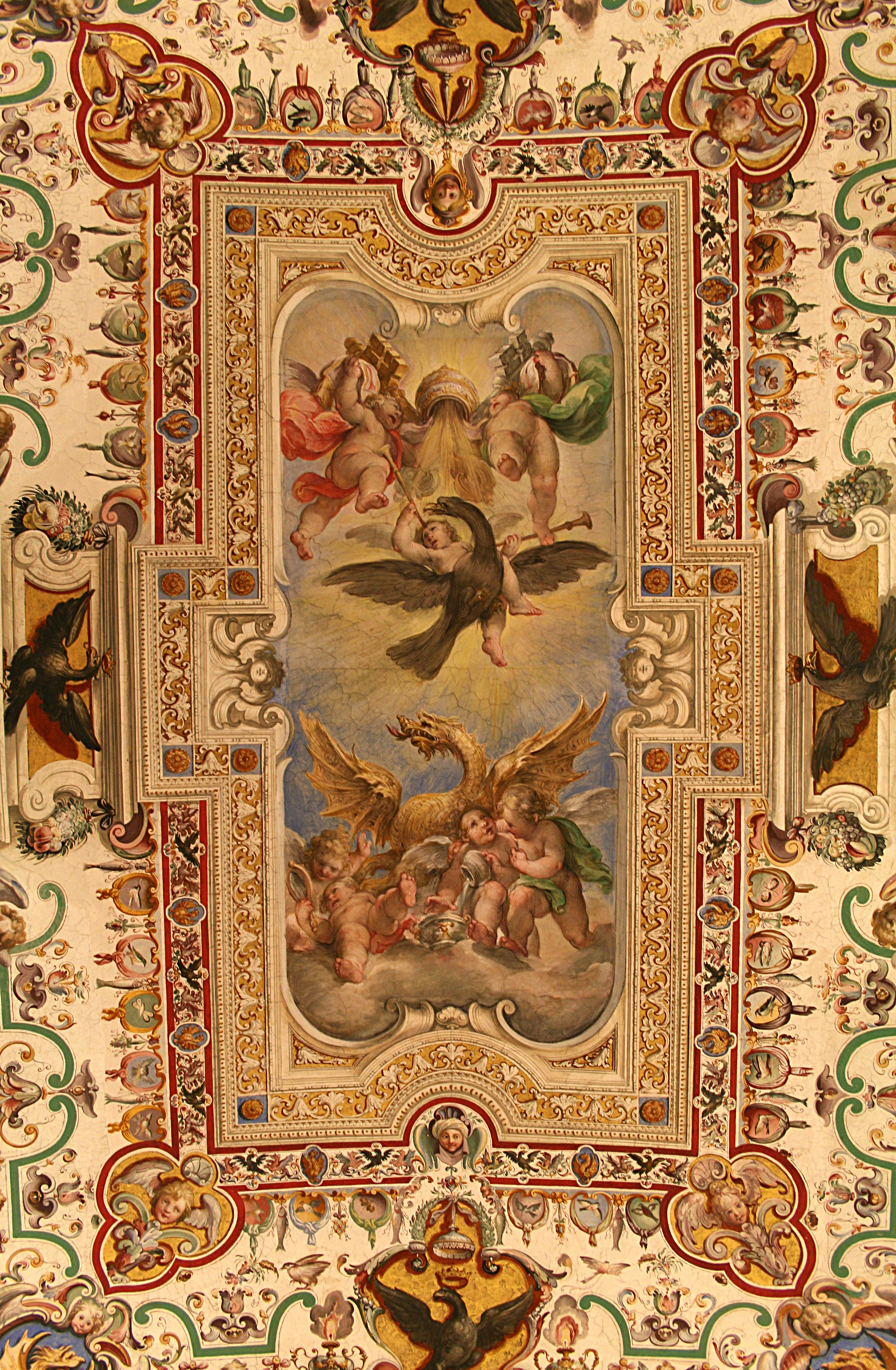
Ceiling fresco of the Sistine Hall (photograph by Jean-Pol Grandmont)

== Library organization ==
=== Catalogue ===
The collection was originally organized through notebooks used to index the manuscripts. As the collection grew to more than a few thousand, shelf lists were used. The first modern catalogue system was put in place under Father Franz Ehrle between 1927 and 1939, using the Library of Congress card catalogue system. Ehrle also set up the first program to take photographs of important or rare works. The library catalogue was further updated by Rev. Leonard E. Boyle when it was computerized in the early 1990s.

=== Reading and lending ===
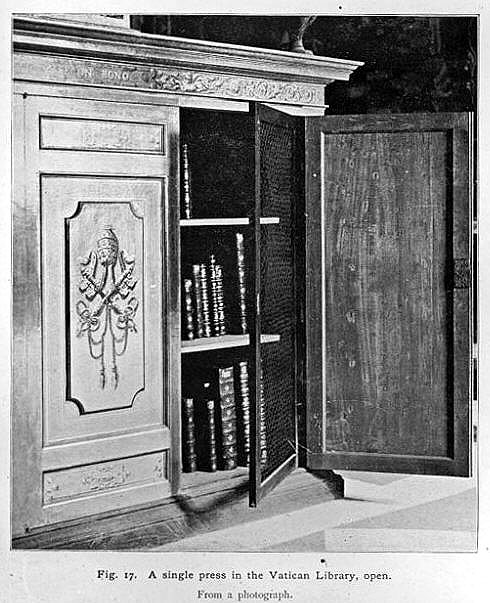
Bookcase in the Vatican Library

Historically, during the Renaissance era, most books were not shelved but stored on wooden benches, which had tables attached to them. Each bench was dedicated to a specific topic. The books were chained to these benches, and if a reader took out a book, the chain remained attached to it. Until the early 17th century, academics were also allowed to borrow books. For important books, the pope himself would issue a reminder slip. Privileges to use the library could be withdrawn for breaking the house rules, for instance, by climbing over the tables. Most famously, Pico Della Mirandola lost the right to use the library when he published a book on theology that the Papal curia did not approve of. In the 1760s, a bill issued by Clement XIII heavily restricted access to the library's holdings.

The Vatican Library can be accessed by 200 scholars at a time, and it sees 4,000 to 5,000 scholars a year, mostly academics doing post-graduate research.

== Collections ==
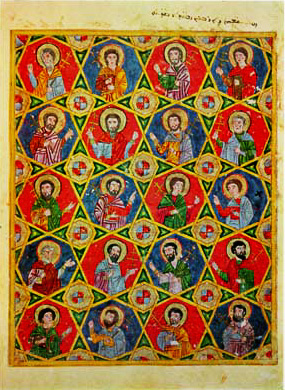
A miniature from the Syriac Gospel Lectionary (Vat. Syr. 559), created c. 1220 near Mosul and exhibiting a strong Islamic influence

While the Vatican Library has always included Bibles, canon law texts, and theological works, it specialized from the beginning in secular books. Its collection of Greek and Latin classics was at the centre of the revival of classical culture during the Renaissance. The oldest documents in the library date back to the first century.

The library was founded primarily as a manuscript library, a fact reflected in the comparatively high ratio of manuscripts to printed works in its collection. Such printed books as have made their way into the collection are intended solely to facilitate the study of the much larger collection of manuscripts.

The collection also includes 330,000 Greek, Roman, and papal coins and medals.

Every year about 6,000 new books are acquired.

The library was enriched by several bequests and acquisitions over the centuries.

In 1623, in thanks for the adroit political manoeuvres of Pope Gregory XV that had sustained him in his contests with Protestant candidates for the post of Elector, the hereditary Palatine Library of Heidelberg, containing about 3,500 manuscripts, was given to the Holy See by Maximilian I, Duke of Bavaria. He had just acquired it as loot in the Thirty Years' War. A token 39 of the Heidelberg manuscripts were sent to Paris in 1797 and were returned to Heidelberg at the Peace of Paris in 1815. A gift of 852 others was made in 1816 by Pope Pius VII to the University of Heidelberg. Aside from these cases, the Palatine Library remains in the Vatican Library to this day.

In 1657, the manuscripts of the Dukes of Urbino were acquired. In 1661, the Greek scholar Leo Allatius was made librarian.

Queen Christina of Sweden's important library (mostly amassed by her generals as loot from Habsburg Prague and German cities during the Thirty Years' War) was purchased on her death in 1689 by Pope Alexander VIII. It represented, for all practical purposes, the entire royal library of Sweden at the time. Had it remained where it was in Stockholm, it would all have been lost in the destruction of the royal palace by fire in 1697.

Among the most famous holdings of the library is the Codex Vaticanus Graecus 1209, the oldest known nearly complete manuscript of the Bible. The Secret History of Procopius was discovered in the library and published in 1623.

Pope Clement XI sent scholars into the Orient to bring back manuscripts and is generally regarded as the founder of the library's Oriental section.

A School of library science is associated with the Vatican Library.

In 1959, the Vatican Film Library was established. This is not to be confused with the Knights of Columbus Vatican Film Library, which was established in 1953 at Saint Louis University in St. Louis, Missouri.

The library has a large collection of texts related to Hinduism, with the oldest editions dating to 1819.

During the library's restoration between 2007 and 2010, all of the 70,000 volumes in the library were tagged with electronic chips to prevent theft.

=== Manuscripts ===
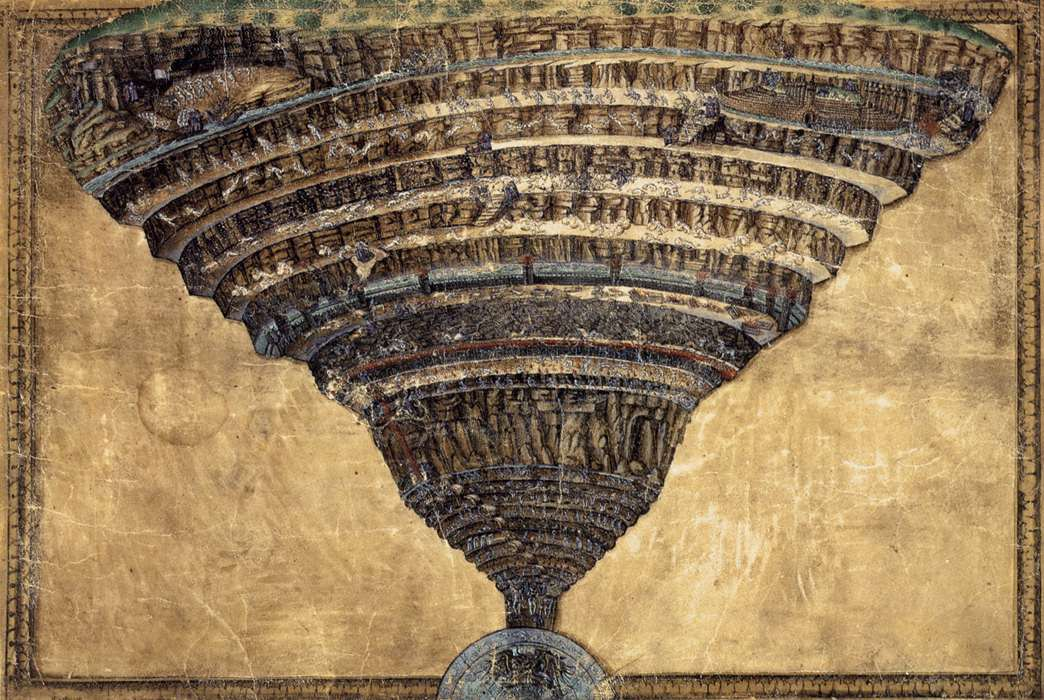
The Abyss of Hell, coloured drawing on parchment by Sandro Botticelli (1480s)

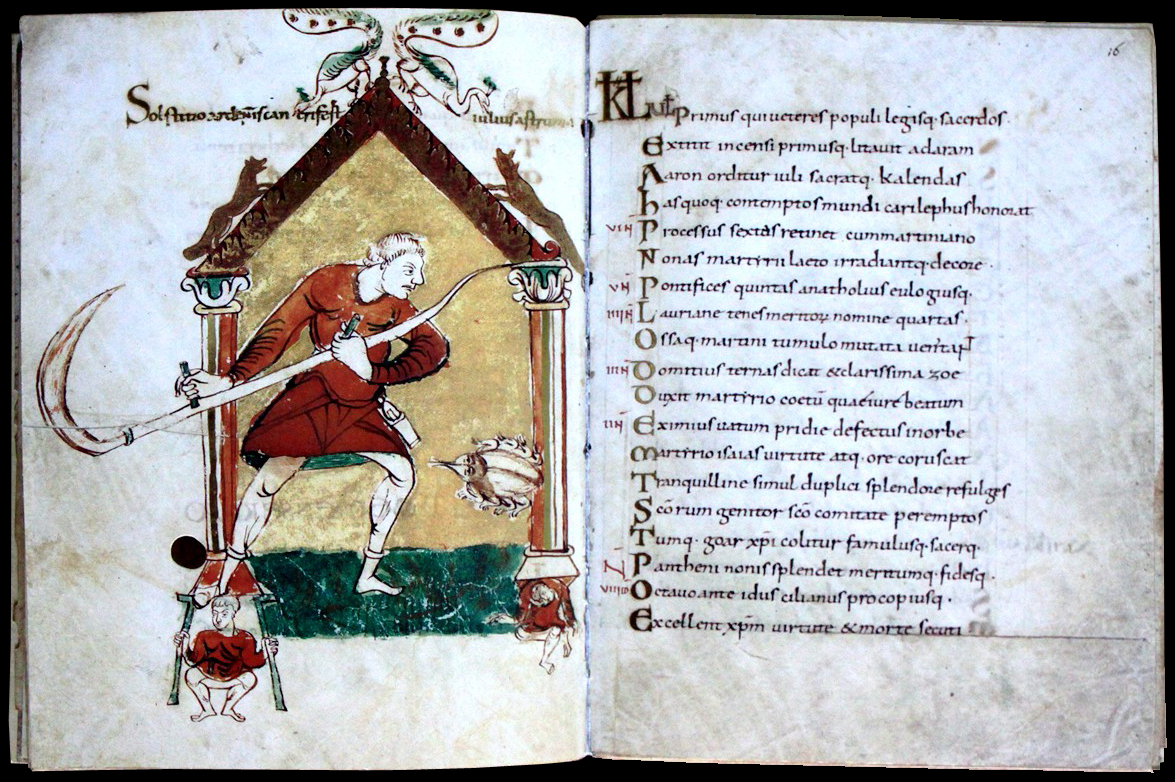
Wandalbert von Prüm, July, Martyrologium (c860)

Notable manuscripts in the library include:

==== Manuscripts relating to Christianity ====
- Codex Vaticanus Graecus 1209, one of the oldest extant Bibles in the Greek language
- Barberini Gospels
- Gelasian Sacramentary, one of the oldest books on Christian liturgy
- Joshua Roll
- Lorsch Gospels, an illuminated gospel book written and illustrated from 778 to 820, which is spread across various museums. The carved ivory rear cover and the Gospels of Luke and John are kept in the Vatican Library
- Menologion of Basil II
- Vatican Croatian Prayer Book
- Three fragments of the Old Saxon Genesis and one fragment of Heliand comprise the Palatinus Latinus 1447
- Libri Carolini

==== Classic Greek and Latin texts ====
- Vergilius Vaticanus
- Vergilius Romanus
- Vergilius Augusteus, four leaves are at the Vatican Library, with three leaves at Berlin State Library
- Codex Vaticanus Ottobonianus Latinus 1829, an important 14th-century manuscript of Catullus' poems
- Codex Vaticanus Latinus 3868, a 9th-century facsimile of Terence's comedies
- Parts of Euclid's Elements, most notably Book I, Proposition 47, one of the oldest Greek texts on the Pythagorean theorem

==== Medieval Greek and Latin texts ====
- Codex Vaticano Rossi 215, fragments of the Rossi Codex
- Vaticanus Graecus 1001, the original manuscript of the Secret History
- De arte venandi cum avibus, a Latin treatise on falconry in the format of a two-column parchment codex of 111 folios written in the 1240s

==== Others ====
- Codex Borgia, an extensive Mesoamerican manuscript that depicts mythology and foundational rituals in the hieroglyphic texts and iconography made of animal skins
- Codex Vat. Arabo 368, the sole manuscript of the Hadith Bayad wa Riyad, an Arabic love story
- Codex Vaticanus 3738, the Codex Ríos, an accordion folded Italian translation of a Spanish colonial-era manuscript, with copies of the Aztec paintings from the original Codex Telleriano-Remensis, believed to be written by the Dominican friar Ríos in 1566
- Borgiani Siriaci 175, a manuscript scroll of the Diwan Abatur, a Mandaean text

==== Qurans ====
The library contains over 100 Quran manuscripts from various collections, catalogued by the Italian Jewish linguist Giorgio Levi Della Vida: Vaticani arabi 73; Borgiani arabi 25; Barberiniani orientali 11; Rossiani 2. The largest manuscript in the library, Vat. Ar. 1484, measures 540x420mm. The smallest, Vat. Ar. 924, is a circle of 45mm diameter preserved in an octagonal case.

=== Digitization projects ===
In 2012, plans were announced to digitize, in collaboration with the Bodleian Library, a million pages of material from the Vatican Library.

On 20 March 2014, the Holy See announced that NTT Data Corporation and the library had concluded an agreement to digitize approximately 3,000 of the library's manuscripts within four years. NTT is donating the equipment and technicians, estimated to be worth 18 million euros. It noted that there is the possibility of subsequently digitizing another 79,000 of the library's holdings. These will be high-definition images available on the library's Internet site. Storage for the holdings will be on a three petabyte server provided by EMC. It is expected that the initial phase will take four years.

DigiVatLib is the name of the Vatican Library's digital library service. It provides free access to the Vatican Library's digitized collections of manuscripts and incunabula.

The scanning of documents is impacted by the material used to produce the texts. Books using gold and silver in the illuminations require special scanning equipment. Digital copies are being served using the CIFS protocol, from network-attached storage hardware by Dell EMC.

=== Gallery of holdings ===
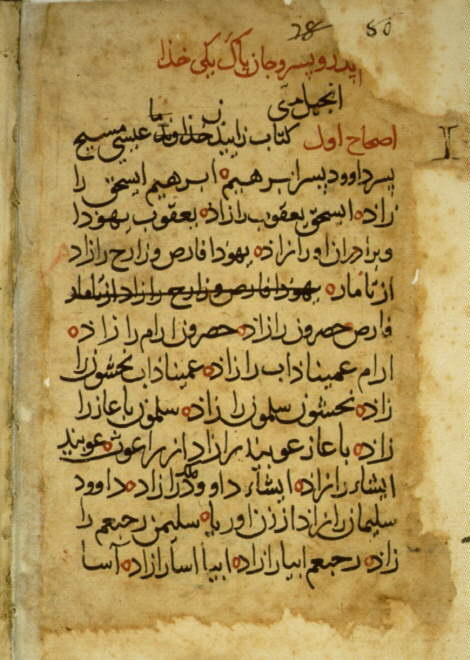
Gospel of Matthew in Persian, the first Persian manuscript to enter the Vatican Library

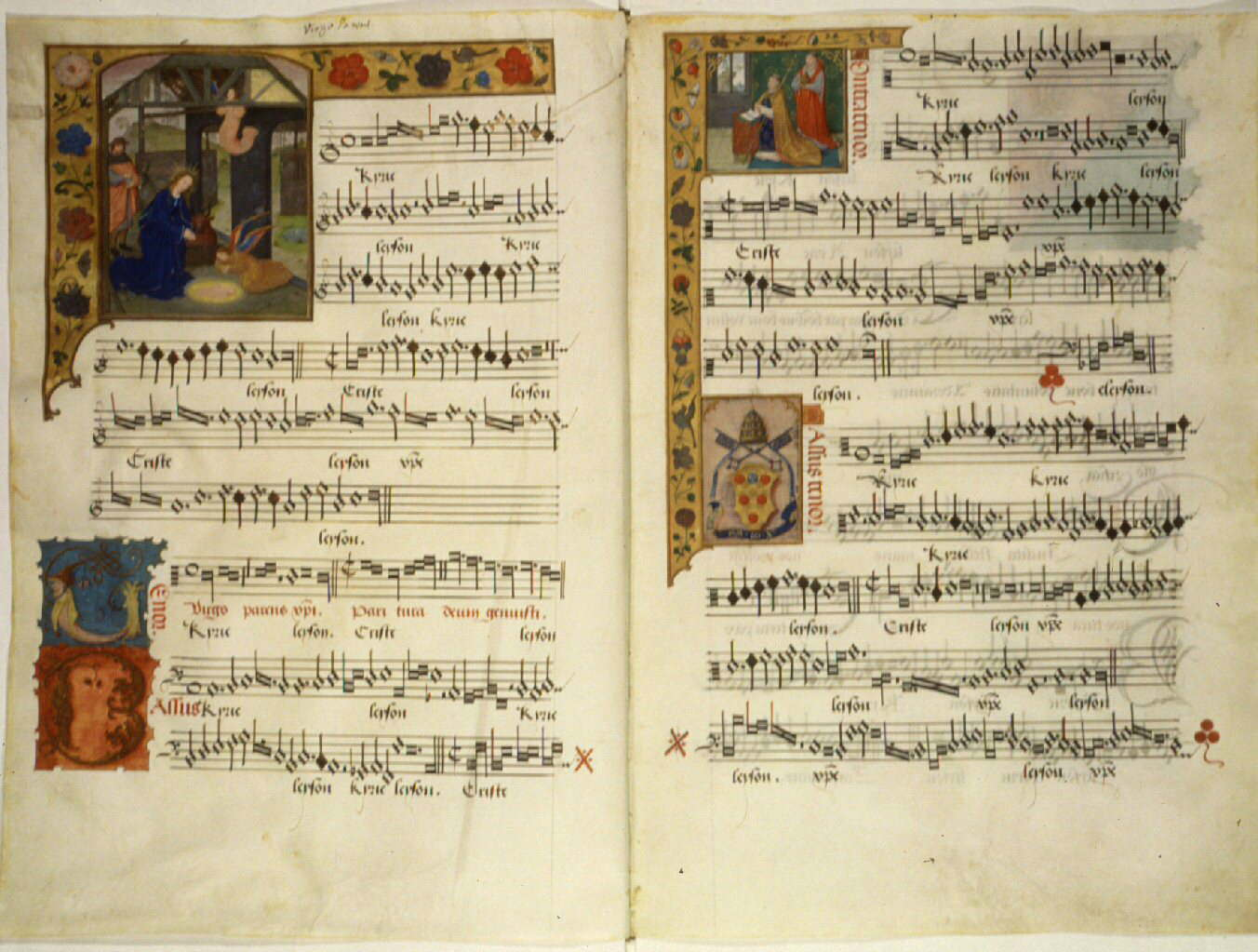
Manuscript page with the five-voice "Kyrie" of the Missa Virgo Parens Christi by Jacques Barbireau

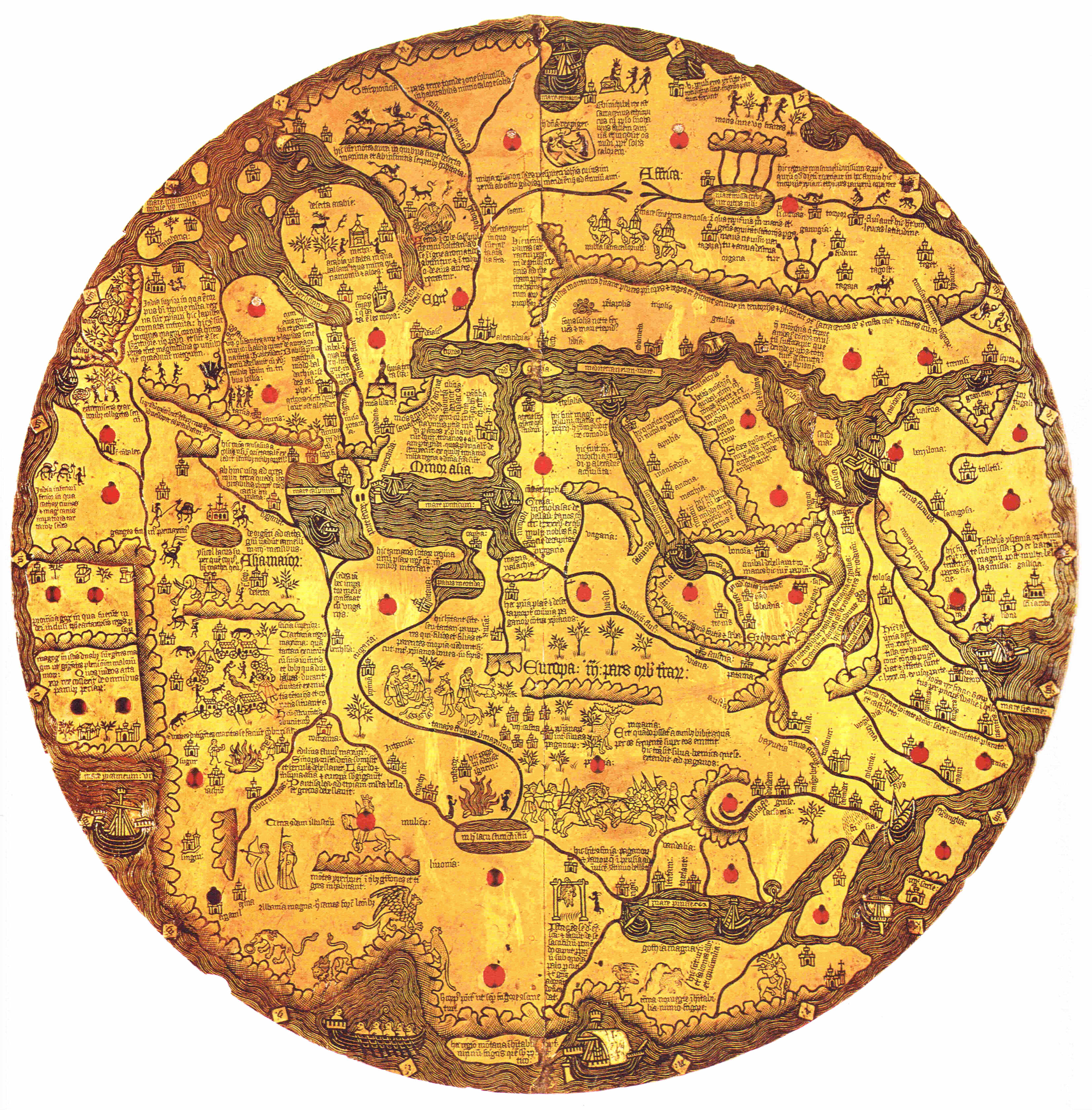
Mappamondo Borgiano, also known as "Tavola di Velletri", consisting of two copper tablets (1430)

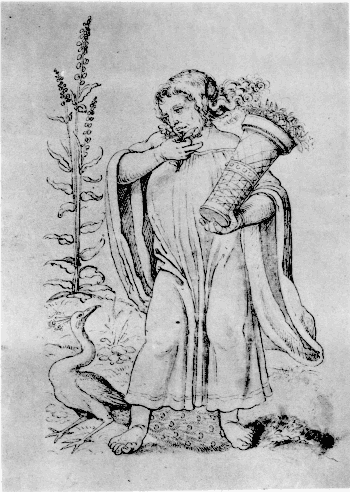
Month of May from in the Chronography of 354 by the 4th century calligrapher Filocalus

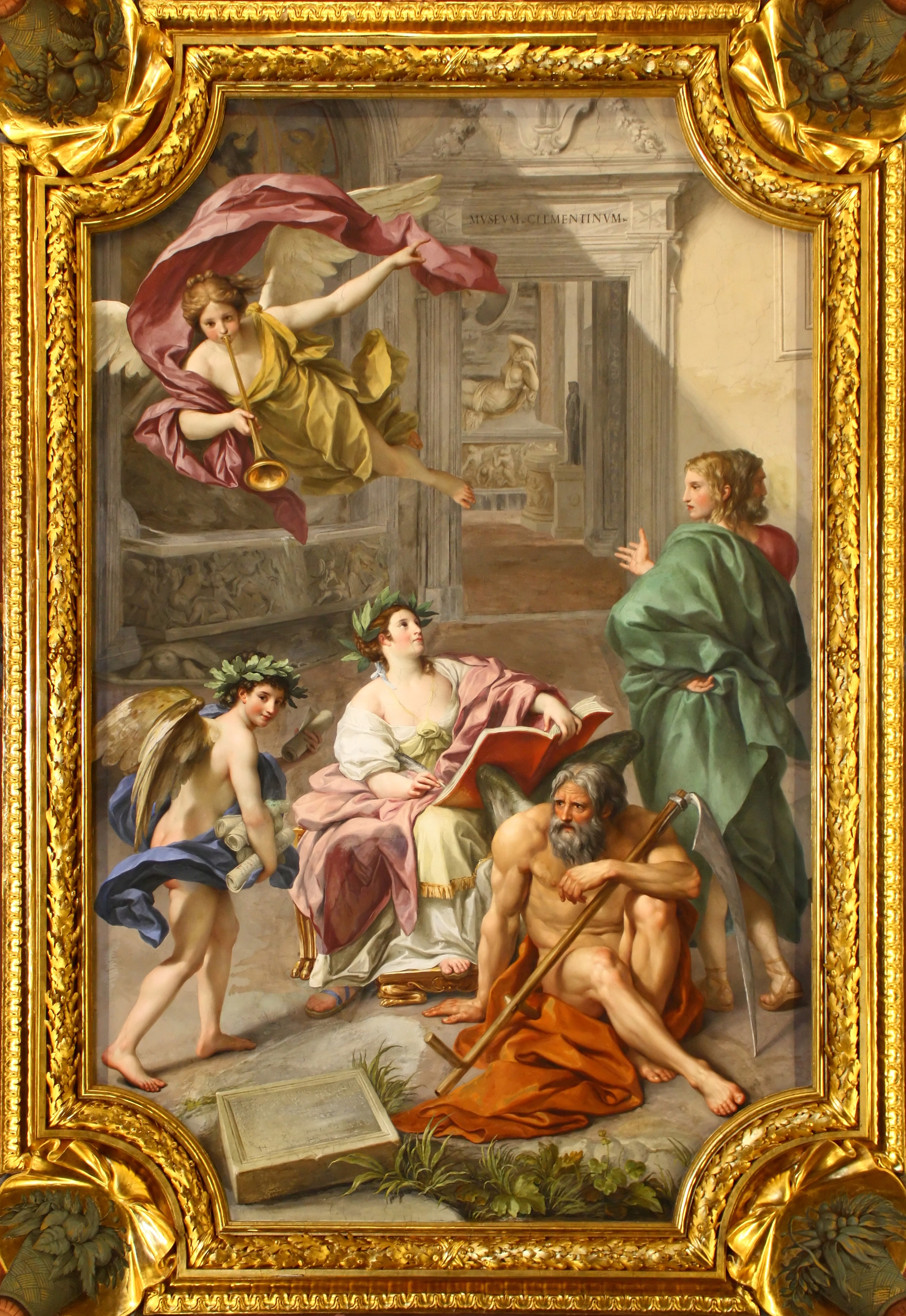
Anton Raphael Mengs, The Triumph of History over Time (Allegory of the Museum Clementinum), ceiling fresco in the Camera dei Papiri, Vatican Library

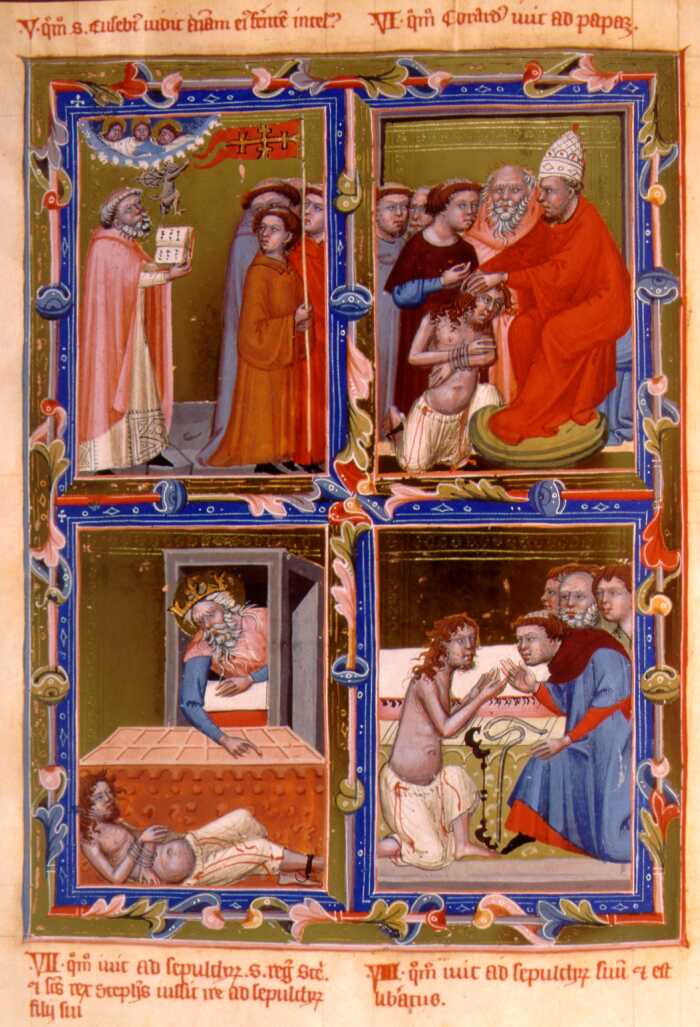
Illumination from the legend of Saint Emeric of Hungary, c. 1335

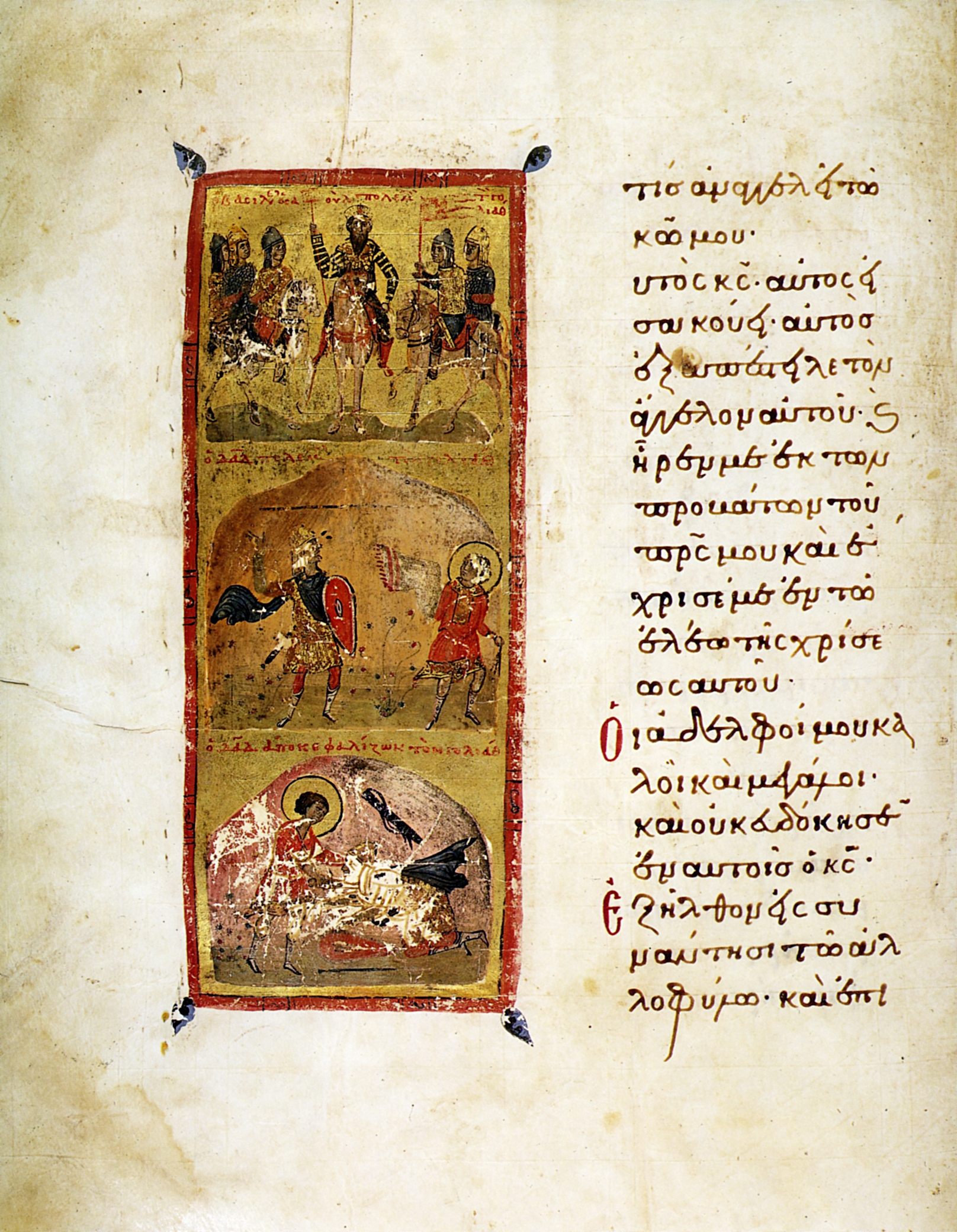
Battle between David and Goliath, Book of Psalms, c. 1059

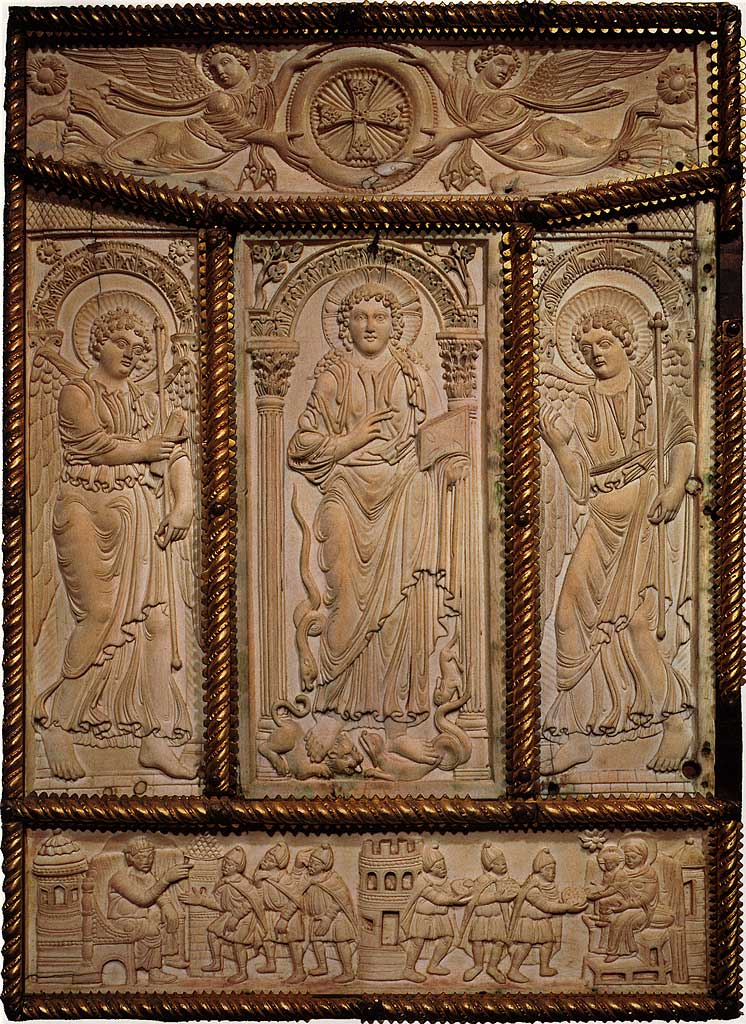
The ivory panels from the back cover of Codex Aureus of Lorsch

== Related libraries ==
=== Vatican Apostolic Archive ===
The Vatican Apostolic Archive, located in Vatican City, is the central archive for all of the acts promulgated by the Holy See, as well as the state papers, correspondence, papal account books, and many other documents which the church has accumulated over the centuries. In the 17th century, under the orders of Pope Paul V, the Archives were separated from the Vatican Library, where scholars had some very limited access to them, and remained absolutely closed to outsiders until 1881, when Pope Leo XIII opened them to researchers, more than a thousand of whom now examine its documents each year.

=== Vatican Film Library ===
The Vatican Film Library in St. Louis, Missouri is the only collection, outside the Vatican itself, of microfilms of more than 37,000 works from the Biblioteca Apostolica Vaticana, the Vatican Library in Europe. It is located in the Pius XII Library on the campus of Saint Louis University. The library was created by Lowrie J. Daly (1914–2000), with funding from the Knights of Columbus. The goal was to make Vatican and other documents more available to researchers in North America.

Microfilming of Vatican manuscripts began in 1951 and, according to the library's website, was the largest microfilming project that had been undertaken up to that date. The library opened in 1953, and moved to the St. Louis University campus, in the Pius XII Memorial Library, in 1959. The first librarian was Charles J. Ermatinger, who served until 2000. As of 2007, the library has microfilmed versions of over 37,000 manuscripts, with material in Greek, Latin, Arabic, Hebrew and Ethiopic, as well as several more common Western European languages. There are reproductions of many works from the Biblioteca Palatina and Biblioteca Cicognara at the Vatican, as well as Papal letter registers from the Archivio Segreto Vaticano (Vatican Secret Archives) from the 9th to 16th centuries, in the series Registra Vaticana and Registra Supplicationium.

== Staff ==
The nominal head of the library has often over the centuries been made a cardinal and hence given the title Cardinal Librarian. The effective directors, often distinguished scholars, were in an earlier period called "Custodians. After the reopening of the library in 1883, Pope Leo XIII changed the title to Prefect.

The library currently has some 80 staff who work in five departments: manuscripts and archival collections, printed books/drawings, acquisitions/cataloguing, coin collections/museums and restoration/photography.

=== List of librarians ===
(P) Indicates time spent as pro-librarian, that is, acting librarian, often a librarian who is not a cardinal.

Name	Lifetime	Title	Duration as librarian
Marcello Cervini	1501–1555	Bibliothecarius I	24 May 1550–9 April 1555
Roberto de' Nobili	1541–1559	Bibliothecarius II	1555–18 January 1559
Alfonso Carafa	1540–1565	Bibliothecarius III	1559–29 August 1565
Marcantonio da Mula	1506–1572	Bibliothecarius IV	1565–17 March 1572
Guglielmo Sirleto	1514–1585	Bibliothecarius V	18 March 1572–16 October 1585
Antonio Carafa	1538–1591	Bibliothecarius VI	16 October 1585–13 January 1591
Marco Antonio Colonna	1523 ca.–1597	Bibliothecarius VII	1591–13 March 1597
Cesare Baronio	1538–1607	Bibliothecarius VIII	May 1597–30 June 1607
Ludovico de Torres	1552–1609	Bibliothecarius IX	4 July 1607–8 July 1609
Scipione Borghese Caffarelli	1576–1633	Bibliothecarius X	11 June 1609–17 February 1618
Scipione Cobelluzzi	1564–1626	Bibliothecarius XI	17 February 1618–29 June 1626
Francesco Barberini	1597–1679	Bibliothecarius XII	1 July 1626–13 December 1633
Antonio Barberini	1569–1646	Bibliothecarius XIII	13 December 1633–11 September 1646
Orazio Giustiniani	1580–1649	Bibliothecarius XIV	25 September 1646–25 July 1649
Luigi Capponi	1583–1659	Bibliothecarius XV	4 August 1649–6 April 1659
Flavio Chigi	1631–1693	Bibliothecarius XVI	21 June 1659–19 September 1681
Lorenzo Brancati	1612–1693	Bibliothecarius XVII	19 September 1681–30 November 1693
Girolamo Casanate	1620–1700	Bibliothecarius XVIII	2 December 1693–3 March 1700
Enrico Noris	1631–1704	Bibliothecarius XIX	26 March 1700–23 February 1704
Benedetto Pamphili	1653–1730	Bibliothecarius XX	26 February 1704–22 March 1730
Angelo Maria Querini	1680–1755	Bibliothecarius XXI	4 September 1730–6 January 1755
Domenico Passionei	1682–1761	Bibliothecarius XXII	10 July 1741–12 January 1755(P); 12 January 1755–5 July 1761
Alessandro Albani	1692–1779	Bibliothecarius XXIII	12 August 1761–11 December 1779
Francesco Saverio de Zelada	1717–1801	Bibliothecarius XXIV	15 December 1779–29 December 1801
Luigi Valenti Gonzaga	1725–1808	Bibliothecarius XXV	12 January 1802–29 December 1808
Giulio Maria della Somaglia	1744–1830	Bibliothecarius XXVI	26 January 1827–2 April 1830
Giuseppe Albani	1750–1834	Bibliothecarius XXVII	23 April 1830–3 December 1834
Luigi Lambruschini	1776–1854	Bibliothecarius XXVIII	11 December 1834–27 June 1853
Angelo Mai	1782–1854	Bibliothecarius XXIX	27 June 1853–9 September 1854
Antonio Tosti	1776–1866	Bibliothecarius XXX	13 January 1860–20 March 1866
Jean Baptiste François Pitra	1812–1889	Bibliothecarius XXXI	19 January 1869–9 February 1889
Placido Maria Schiaffino	1829–1889	Bibliothecarius XXXII	20 February 1889–23 September 1889
Alfonso Capecelatro	1824–1912	Bibliothecarius XXXIII	29 August 1890–14 November 1912
Mariano Rampolla del Tindaro	1843–1913	Bibliothecarius XXXIV	26 November 1912–16 December 1913
Francesco di Paola Cassetta	1841–1919	Bibliothecarius XXXV	3 January 1914–23 March 1919
Aidan [Francis Neil] Gasquet	1845–1929	Bibliothecarius XXXVI	9 May 1919–5 April 1929
Franz Ehrle	1845–1934	Bibliothecarius XXXVII	17 April 1929–31 March 1934
Giovanni Mercati	1866–1957	Bibliothecarius XXXVIII	18 June 1936–23 August 1957
Eugène Tisserant	1884–1972	Bibliothecarius XXXIX	14 September 1957–27 March 1971
Antonio Samoré	1905–1983	Bibliothecarius XL	25 January 1974–3 February 1983
Alfons Maria Stickler	1910–2007	Bibliothecarius XLI	7 September 1983–27 May 1985(P); 27 May 1985–1 July 1988
Antonio María Javierre Ortas	1921–2007	Bibliothecarius XLII	1 July 1988–24 January 1992
Luigi Poggi	1917–2010	Bibliothecarius XLIII	9 April 1992–29 November 1994(P); 29 November 1994–25 November 1997
Jorge María Mejía	1923–2014	Bibliothecarius XLIV	7 March 1998–24 November 2003
Jean-Louis Tauran	1943–2018	Bibliothecarius XLV	24 November 2003–25 June 2007
Raffaele Farina	1933–	Bibliothecarius XLVI	25 June 2007–9 June 2012
Jean-Louis Bruguès	1943–	Bibliothecarius XLVII	26 June 2012–1 September 2018
José Tolentino de Mendonça	1965–	Bibliothecarius XLVIII	1 September 2018–26 September 2022
Angelo Vincenzo Zani	1950–	Bibliothecarius XLIX	26 September 2022–28 March 2025
Giovanni Cesare Pagazzi	1965–		28 March 2025–

== See also ==
- Index of Vatican City-related articles
- Archive of the Congregation for the Doctrine of the Faith
- The Vatican Splendors
