= Jean-Louis Bruguès =

French archbishop

His Excellency, The Most Reverend Jean-Louis Bruguès
- Archivist and Librarian Emeritus of the Holy Roman Church
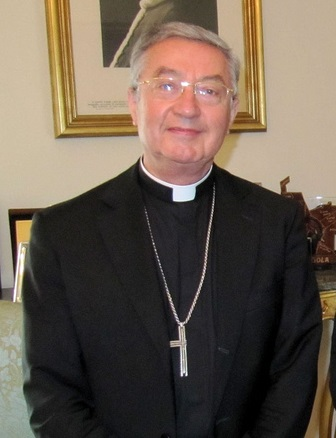
- Appointed: 26 June 2012
- Term ended: 1 September 2018
- Predecessor: Raffaele Farina
- Successor: José Tolentino Mendonça
- Other posts: Secretary of the Congregation for Catholic Education; Bishop of Angers

Orders
- Ordination: 22 June 1975
- Consecration: 30 April 2000 by Pierre Eyt
- Rank: Archbishop

Personal details
- Born: 22 November 1943 (age 82) Bagnères de Bigorre, France
- Denomination: Roman Catholic
- Motto: Latin: Gloria tua sapientia mea

Styles of Jean-Louis Bruguès
- Reference style: The Most Reverend
- Spoken style: Your Excellency
- Religious style: Monsignor

Jean-Louis Bruguès, OP (born 22 November 1943) is a French archbishop of the Catholic Church. He was the Archivist and Librarian of the Holy Roman Church from 2012 to 2018.

== Biography ==
Bruguès was born at Bagnères de Bigorre, in the diocese of Tarbes and Lourdes. He studied at the Faculty of Law of Montpellier (1960–1963) and the Faculty of Arts of Madrid (1963–1964), graduating with Law and Economics degrees. He graduated from the School of Political Science in 1966 with a degree in political science. He was selected for the entrance exam to the elite École nationale d'administration, but instead completed a doctorate in theology.

He entered the Dominicans as a novice in Lille (1968–1969). He made his first religious profession on 29 September 1969 and took his solemn vows as a Dominican in 1972. He was ordained a priest on 22 June 1975 in Toulouse.

Bruguès served as prior of the Dominican priories of Toulouse and Bordeaux, and later provincial of the province of Toulouse. He was also professor of fundamental moral theology at the Catholic Institute of Toulouse and then taught the same subject at the University of Fribourg, where he held the chair in fundamental moral theology from 1997 to 2000.

He was a member of the International Theological Commission from 1986 to 2002 and a member of the National Ethics Consultative Committee of France from 1998 to 2000. He was invited by Jean-Marie Lustiger to preach at the Lenten conferences held at Notre-Dame Cathedral in 1995, 1996, and 1997.

On 20 March 2000, Bruguès was appointed Bishop of Angers by Pope John Paul II. He received his episcopal consecration on the following 30 April from Cardinal Pierre Eyt, with Bishop Jean Orchampt and Archbishop François Saint-Macary serving as co-consecrators.

He was elected to a four-year term as president of the Doctrinal Commission of the French Episcopal Conference in 2002.

On 10 November 2007, Pope Benedict XVI named him Secretary of the Congregation for Catholic Education in the Roman Curia and bestowed upon him the personal title of archbishop.

In October 2009 he was named a consultor to the Pontifical Commission for Latin America. Since 19 November 2009, he has been a consultor of the Congregation for the Doctrine of the Faith.

On 26 June 2012, Pope Benedict XVI appointed him the Archivist and Librarian of the Holy Roman Church. In March 2014 he announced that the Vatican Library was digitizing approximately 3000 handwritten manuscripts and considering extending the project to cover all its holdings.

Bruguès served as President of the Organizing Committee of the Vatican Foundation Joseph Ratzinger - Benedict XVI for the Symposium on "The Gospels: History and Christology - Research of Joseph Cardinal Ratzinger, Pope Benedict XVI", which was held at the Pontifical Lateran University on 24–26 October 2013.

== Select writings ==
- Dictionnaire de morale catholique, CLD, 1991 révisé en 1996 ISBN 2-85443-320-3
- Précis de théologie morale générale, Mame, 1995 (volume 1), 2002 (volume 2)
- L’Éternité si proche. Conférence du Carême 1995 à Notre-Dame de Paris, Cerf, 1995 ISBN 2-204-05222-1
- Les Idées heureuses, vertus chrétiennes pour ce temps. Conférence du Carême 1996 à Notre-Dame de Paris, Cerf, 1996 ISBN 2-204-05456-9
- Des combats de lumière. Conférence du Carême 1997 à Notre-Dame de Paris, Cerf, 1997 ISBN 2-204-05682-0
- Guy Bedouelle, Jean-Louis Bruguès, Philippe Becquart (May 2006). L'Eglise et la sexualité: Repères historiques et regards actuels. Histoire du christianisme. Millau: CERF. p. 263. ISBN 2-204-08060-8.
- Chemin faisant. Entretiens spirituels, Cerf, 2016

== See also ==
- Vatican Library

Catholic Church titles
Preceded by Jean Orchampt	Bishop of Angers; 2000–2007	Succeeded by Emmanuel Delmas
Preceded by John Miller	Secretary of the Congregation for Catholic Education; 2007–2012	Succeeded by Angelo Vincenzo Zani
Preceded by Raffaele Farina	Librarian of the Holy Roman Church; 26 June 2012 – 1 September 2018	Succeeded by Jose Tolentino Calaça de Mendonça
Preceded by Raffaele Farina	Archivist of the Vatican Secret Archives; 26 June 2012 – 1 September 2018	Succeeded by Jose Tolentino Calaça de Mendonça
