= Jean Orchampt =

Roman Catholic Bishop (1923–2021)

His Excellency Jean Pierre Marie Orchampt
- Bishop Emeritus of Angers
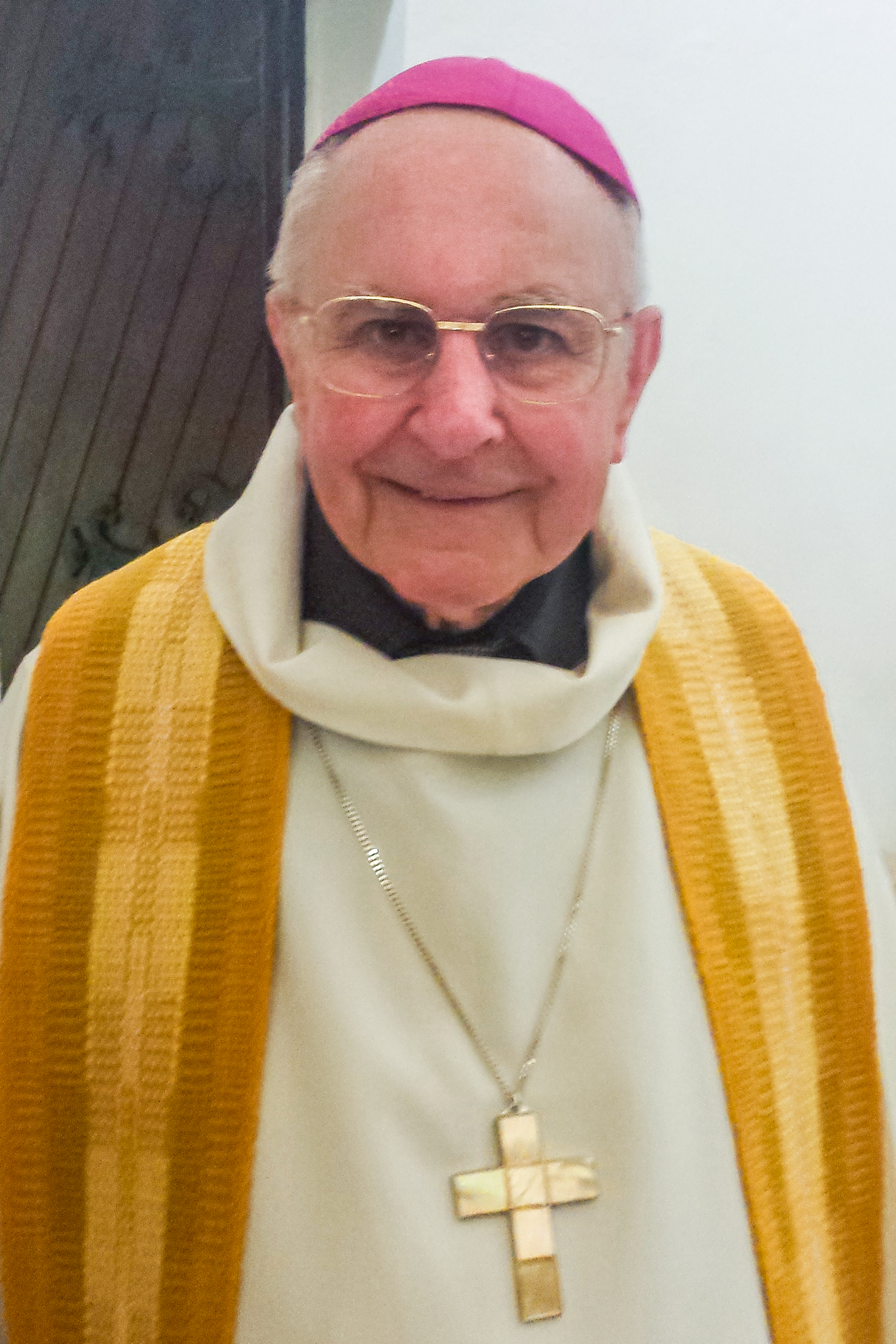
- Church: Roman Catholic Church
- See: Roman Catholic Diocese of Angers
- In office: 1974 - 2000
- Predecessor: Henri-Louis-Marie Mazerat
- Successor: Jean-Louis Bruguès, O.P.
- Previous post: Auxiliary Bishop of Montpellier (1971-1974)

Orders
- Ordination: 29 June 1948
- Consecration: 18 September 1971 by Marc-Armand Lallier
- Rank: Bishop

Personal details
- Born: 9 December 1923 Vesoul, France
- Died: 21 August 2021 (aged 97)

Jean Pierre Marie Orchampt (9 December 1923 – 21 August 2021) was a French prelate of the Roman Catholic Church. Prior to his death, he was the oldest living bishop from France, at the age of 97.

Orchampt was born in Vesoul and was ordained a priest on 29 June 1948. Orchampt was appointed auxiliary bishop of the Archdiocese of Montpellier as well as titular bishop of Aquae in Mauretania on 14 June 1971 and consecrated on 18 September 1971. Orchampt was appointed bishop of Diocese of Angers on 5 July 1974 and remained at this post until his retirement on 20 March 2000. He died in August 2021 at the age of 97.
