= Giuseppe Pittau =

Giuseppe Pittau (20 October 1928 – 26 December 2014) was a Roman Catholic titular archbishop.

Born in Villacidro, Italy, Pittau was ordained to the priesthood for the Society of Jesus on 18 March 1959. He earned a PhD from Harvard University in 1963. On 28 July 1998 Pope John Paul II appointed Pittau titular archbishop of Castro di Sardegna and secretary of the Congregation for Catholic Education and Pittau was ordained on 26 September 1998. He was also rector of Sophia University in Tokyo, and of the Gregorian University in Rome. On 25 November 2003, Pittau retired. Pittau died on Friday 26 December 2014. Before his service in the Congregation for Catholic Education, he had assisted the Jesuit that Pope John Paul II had chosen in the early 1980s, Cardinal Paolo Dezza, S.J., to govern the order following the incapacitation due to a stroke of their then-superior general, Father Pedro Arrupe, S.J. Pope Francis made reference to the services he had rendered in Tokyo and at the Gregorian University, to the Roman Curia, and to the Society of Jesus in the telegram of condolence he sent to the Jesuit superior general, Father Adolfo Nicolas, S.J., upon learning of his death.
