= Franco Manzi =

Italian Catholic priest and academic (born 1966)

- Born: Franco Manzi; 17 February 1966; Milan, Italy
- Education: Pontifical baccalaureate in theology; Licentiate at the Biblical Faculty; Licentiate in Biblical Sciences
- Occupations: Priest; Writer; Theologian

Franco Manzi (born 17 February 1966) is an Italian Catholic priest and academic.

== Biography ==
Born in Milan, Italy, he did his schooling in the liceo classico of the 'Pius XI' diocesan seminary at Venegono Inferiore, in the province of Varese, [Italy]. Subsequently, he followed the usual cycle of studies at the major seminary itself and in 1990 gained the pontifical baccalaureate in theology from the Facoltà Teologica dell'Italia Settentrionale. On June 8, 1991, he was ordained priest at Milan for the diocese by the then archbishop, Cardinal Carlo Maria Martini, a noted biblical exegete.

From 1991 to 1994, Manzi pursued studies for the licentiate at the Biblical Faculty of the Pontifical Biblical Institute in Rome. Under the direction of Fr Albert Vanhoye, S.J., later made cardinal by Pope Benedict XVI, he prepared the required thesis for the licentiate, entitled 'L'opera salvifica di Gesù Cristo tra kenosi (Fil 2,6-11) e solidarietà (Eb 5,5-10)' (The Salvific Work of Jesus Christ between Kenosis (Phil 2:6-11) and Solidarity (Heb 5:5-10)). He was granted the Licentiate in Biblical Sciences (SSL) on 15 February 1994, with an average grade of summa cum laude. Similarly, the dissertation for the ad doctoratum year on the subject 'Melchisedek a Qumran e nella Lettera agli Ebrei' ('Melchisedek at Qumran and in the Letter to the Hebrews'), prepared under the direction of Fr Albert Vanhoye, received the grade of summa cum laude. On 24 February 1995, he successfully delivered the lectio coram prior to the drawing up of the doctoral thesis.

In the meanwhile (1992–1994), he was a resident student at the École Biblique et Archéologique Française de Jérusalem, where in the second semester of the academic year 1992-1993 he followed courses that were recognized by the Pontifical Biblical Institute for the curriculum ad licentiam and followed further courses in the corresponding semester of 1993–1994. As a result of work undertaken in Jerusalem, he was granted the title élève titulaire de l'École Biblique.

On 15 February 1995, he began the final phase of research for the doctorate on 'Melchisedek e l'angelologia nell'Epistola agli Ebrei e a Qumran' ('Melchisedek and Angelology in the Epistle to the Hebrews and at Qumran'), under the direction of Fr Albert Vanhoye (moderator) and Fr Joseph Sievers (relator). On December 18, 1996, he defended his thesis at the Biblical Faculty of the Pontifical Biblical Institute in Rome, being awarded the grade summa cum laude. On 3 February 1997, he published the complete text of the doctoral thesis in the book series Analecta Biblica (n. 136).

He received from Cardinal Carlo Maria Martini his formal appointment as lecturer for theological courses at the diocesan major seminary at Venegono Inferiore (1 February 1997) and on 3 June 1999, was awarded a doctorate in theology with specialization in Mariology in the Pontifical Theological Faculty Marianum in Rome, with the grade summa cum laude, defending a thesis 'La forma obbedienziale del servizio di Gesù Cristo e di Maria. Confronto esegetico-teologico di Fil 2,7 con Lc 1,48' ('Obedience as Form of the Service of Jesus Christ and of Mary: Exegetical and Theological Comparison between Phil 2:7 and Lk 1:48'), of which an extract was published in July that year.

He is currently lecturer of New Testament and Hebrew at the diocesan seminary of Milan (from 1997), and guest lecturer in Old and New Testament in the Facoltà Teologica dell’Italia Settentrionale (from 2000), in the Istituto Superiore di Scienze Religiose of Milan and in the Faculty of Theology at Lugano, Switzerland (from 2006). He is also cultore della materia in New Testament philology and exegesis, literature and philosophy, at the Università Cattolica del Sacro Cuore di Milano (from 1997), director of the journal La Scuola Cattolica, official theological journal of the Milan diocesan seminary, and contributes to a number of other journals of biblical exegesis, of theology, of liturgy and pastoral questions. He is an active member of various associations: the Associazione Biblica Italiana, the Catholic Biblical Association of America, the Society of Biblical Literature, the Studiorum Novi Testamenti Societas and the Associazione Mariologica Italiana, and also of the Congregazione del Rito Ambrosiano (dal 2000).

== Links between Qumran and the Letter to the Hebrews ==
In his doctoral research, Manzi does not detect direct dependence of the Letter to the Hebrews upon the texts and intellectual systems of Qumran, but at the very most, an indirect dependence that is owing to the common origin in the Jewish cultural background, and in particular speculation about the cultic role of angels. Manzi's proposal that the Melchizedek of llQMelchizedek is to be identified with the Almighty is not generally shared by earlier researchers, and it remains for time to tell whether it gains acceptance, being contested by those who maintain that the instances where Melchizedek is presented as an agent of God rather than God himself are numerous. Nevertheless, Manzi's thesis, despite its inaccessibility to those who cannot cope with Italian, the only language in which it has been published so far, has been found "on many points, ... useful and convincing". The published version includes many extensive schemes, indices and bibliographical elements for anyone with a will to examine his arguments. In his later research and publications, Manzi has generally not pursued further investigation of the world of Qumran, which is not lacking in the attention of other scholars, but has been occupied with various themes connected with the Letter to the Hebrews and angelology, as well as the Pauline corpus. He was also one of the editors of the festschrift for his teacher, Cardinal Vanhoye.

== Principal publications ==
- Melchisedek e l’angelologia nell’Epistola agli Ebrei e a Qumran (= Analecta Biblica 136), Roma, Editrice Pontificio Istituto Biblico, 1997, 433 pp.
- Nuovi metodi per la lettura della Bibbia. Tre saggi di esegesi narrativa (Mt 28,16-20), strutturale (Eb 5), e canonica (Is 7). Conferenze tenute a Caravate (VA), 18-20 novembre 1997. Corso residenziale per l’aggiornamento del Clero di Lodi, Ad usum auditorium tantum, Lodi, 1998, 96 pp.
- La "forma" obbedienziale del servizio di Gesù Cristo e di Maria. Confronto esegetico-teologico di Fil 2,7 con Lc 1,48. Estratto della tesi di laurea in sacra teologia con specializzazione in mariologia (= Dissertationes ad lauream in Pontificia Facultate Theologica "Marianum" 79), Roma, 1999, 213 pp.
- Lettera agli Ebrei (= Nuovo Testamento. Commento esegetico e spirituale s.n.), Roma, Città Nuova, 2001, 227 pp.
- Lettera agli Ebrei. Un’omelia per cristiani adulti (= Dabar - Logos - Parola. Lectio Divina Popolare s.n.), Padova, Messaggero, 2001, 204 pp.
- Il pastore dell’essere. Fenomenologia dello sguardo del Figlio (= Studi Cristologici s.n.), Assisi, Cittadella, 2001, 166 pp. (In collaborazione con Giovanni Cesare Pagazzi).
- Seconda Lettera ai Corinzi (= I Libri Biblici; Nuovo Testamento 9), Milano, Paoline, 2002, 462 pp.
- Noi due davanti a Te. Il cammino del fidanzamento e la preghiera (= Laboratorio della Fede s.n.), Milano, In Dialogo, 2003, 62 pp.
- Attirerò tutti a me. Ermeneutica biblica ed etica cristiana (= Trattati di Etica Teologica s.n.), Bologna, EDB, 2005, 482 pp. (In collaborazione con Aristide Fumagalli).
- La bellezza di Maria. Riflessioni bibliche (= Le Àncore s.n.), Milano, Àncora, 2005, 132 pp.
- Carta a los Hebreos (= Comentarios a la Nueva Biblia de Jerusalén 6), Henao, Desclée De Brouwer, 2005, 213 pp.
- Le orme di Cristo. Discernimento e profezia (= Le Àncore s.n.), Milano, Àncora, 2005, 168 pp.
- Lettere di Paolo (= Commenti e Studi Biblici s.n.), Assisi, Cittadella, 2005, 1717 pp. (ed. in collaborazione con Bruno Maggioni; Nuova traduzione e commento di Francesco Bargellini, Bruno Maggioni, Franco Manzi, Giorgio Paximadi, Luca Pedroli).
- AsSaggi biblici. Introduzione alla Bibbia anima della teologia (= Teologia per Laici s.n.), Milano, Àncora, 2006, 295 pp. (ed., con interventi di Gianantonio Borgonovo, Davide D’Alessio, Franco Manzi, Pierantonio Tremolada).
- La belleza de María. Reflexiones bíblicas (= Beber de la Roca s.n.), Madrid, San Pablo, 2006, 147 pp.; originale: La bellezza di Maria. Riflessioni bibliche (= Le Àncore s.n.), Milano, Àncora, 2006, 132 pp.
- Memoria del Risorto e testimonianza della Chiesa, Presentazione del card. Dionigi Tettamanzi (= Commenti e Studi Biblici; Sezione Studi Biblici s.n.), Assisi, Cittadella, 2006, 454 pp.
- Le Regard du Fils. Christologie phénoménologique. Préface de Franco Giulio Brambilla. Traduit de l’italien par Paul Gilbert (= Donner Raison 18), Bruxelles, Lessius, 2006, 144 pp. (In collaborazione con Giovanni Cesare Pagazzi); originale: Il pastore dell’essere. Fenomenologia dello sguardo del Figlio. Prefazione di Franco Giulio Brambilla (= Studi Cristologici s.n.), Assisi, Cittadella, 2001, 166 pp. (In collaborazione con Giovanni Cesare Pagazzi).
- Resistenze alla vocazione (= Frammenti s.n.), Milano, Àncora, 2006, 112 pp. (ed., con interventi di Giuseppe Como, Stefano Guarinelli, Franco Manzi, Alfonso Valsecchi).
- Gesù dodicenne. Spunti biblici e riflessioni teologiche (= Le Àncore s.n.), Milano, Àncora, 2007, 189 pp.
- “Il Verbo di Dio è vivo”. Studi sul Nuovo Testamento in onore del Cardinale Albert Vanhoye, S.I. (= Analecta Biblica 165), Roma, Editrice Pontificio Istituto Biblico, 2007, 632 pp. (ed. in collaborazione con José Enrique Aguilar Chiu - Filippo Urso - Carlos Zesati Estrada).
- Il libro degli angeli. Gli esseri angelici nella Bibbia, nel culto e nella vita cristiana. Nuova Edizione ampiamente integrata con bibliografia aggiornata di Franco Manzi, Roma, CLV – Edizioni Liturgiche, 2008, 144 pp. (In collaborazione con Erik Peterson).
- Paolo, apostolo del Risorto. Sfidando le crisi a Corinto (= Parola di Dio; Seconda Serie 28), Cinisello Balsamo (Milano), San Paolo, 2008, 219 pp.
- La Parola della festa. Commento alle letture festive del nuovo Lezionario ambrosiano. Anno B/1. Avvento – Natale – Dopo l’Epifania (= Sussidi Ambrosiani s.n.), Milano, Àncora, 2008, 207 pp.
- Amicizia di Gesù e risurrezione. Spunti biblici (= Orizzonti Biblici s.n.), Assisi, Cittadella, 2008, 165 pp.
- Il filo rosso del Lezionario ambrosiano festivo. Introduzione ai tempi liturgici (= Sussidi Ambrosiani s.n.), Milano, Àncora, 2009, 92 pp.
- La Parola della festa. Commento alle letture festive del nuovo Lezionario ambrosiano. Anno B/2. Tempo di Quaresima - Settimana autentica - Tempo di Pasqua (= Sussidi Ambrosiani s.n.), Milano, Àncora, 2009, 192 pp.
- La Parola della festa. Commento alle letture festive del nuovo Lezionario ambrosiano. Anno B/3. Dopo la Pentecoste - Dopo il Martirio del Battista - Dopo la Dedicazione (= Sussidi Ambrosiani s.n.), Milano, Àncora, 2009, 240 pp.
- La Parola della festa. Commento alle letture festive del nuovo Lezionario ambrosiano. Anno C/1. Avvento – Natale – Dopo l’Epifania (= Sussidi Ambrosiani s.n.), Milano, Àncora, 2009, 198 pp.
- La Parola della festa. Commento alle letture festive del nuovo Lezionario ambrosiano. Anno C/2. Tempo di Quaresima – Settimana autentica – Tempo di Pasqua (= Sussidi Ambrosiani s.n.), Milano, Àncora, 2010, 176 pp.
