= Angelo Vincenzo Zani =

Italian prelate and Vatican official

- Archivist and Librarian emeritus of the Holy Roman Church
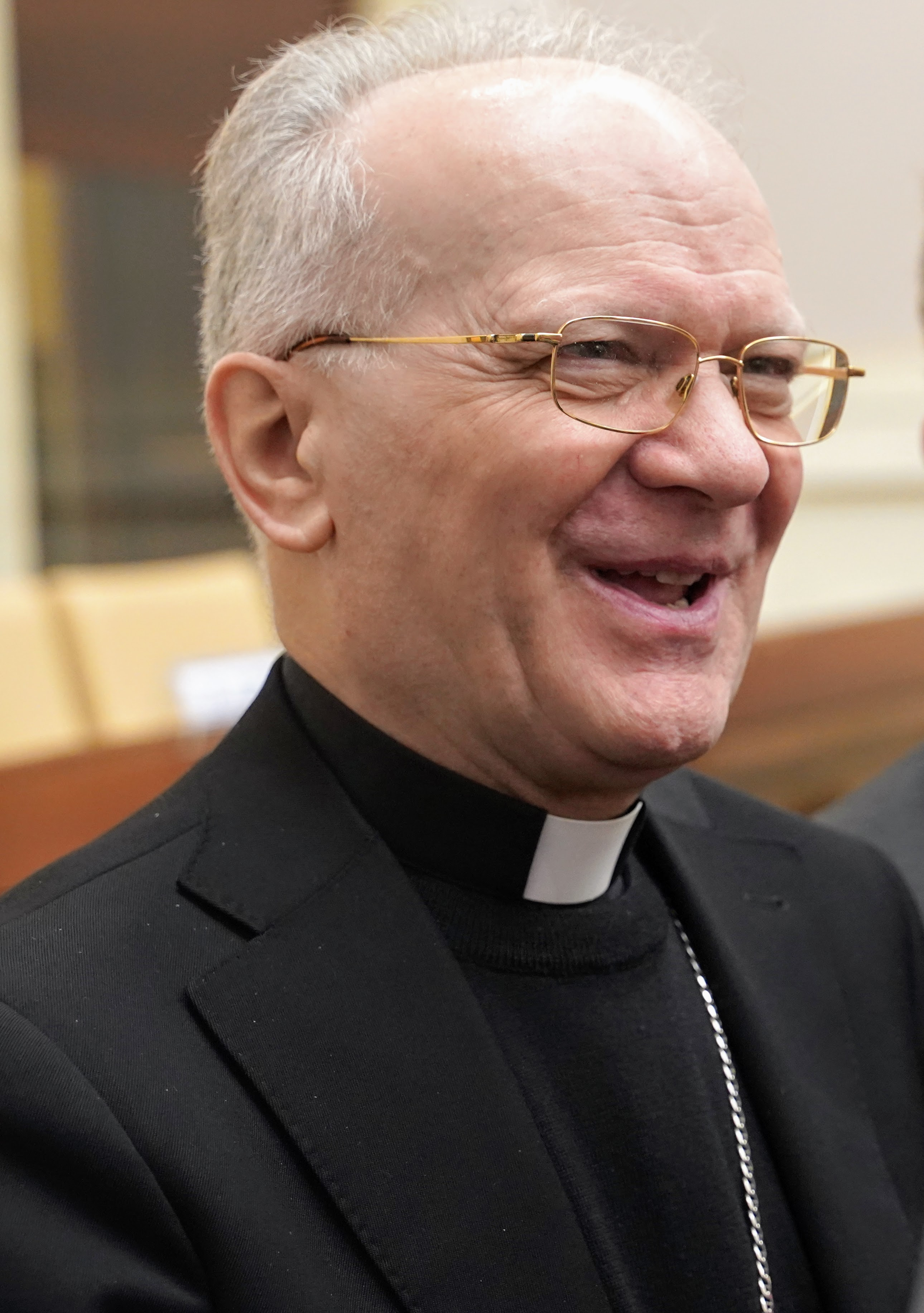
- Zani in 2020
- See: Volturnum
- Appointed: 26 September 2022
- Term ended: 28 March 2025
- Predecessor: José Tolentino de Mendonça
- Successor: Giovanni Cesare Pagazzi
- Other post: Titular Archbishop of Volturnum
- Previous post: Secretary of the Congregation for Catholic Education (2012–2022)

Orders
- Ordination: 20 September 1975 by Luigi Morstabilini
- Consecration: 6 January 2013 by Pope Benedict XVI

Personal details
- Born: 24 March 1950 (age 76) Pralboino, Italy
- Denomination: Roman Catholic
- Education: Pontifical University of Saint Thomas Aquinas, Pontifical Lateran University, Pontifical Gregorian University
- Coat of arms

Styles of Angelo Vincenzo Zani
- Reference style: His Excellency
- Spoken style: Your Excellency
- Religious style: Archbishop

Angelo Vincenzo Zani (born 24 March 1950) is an Italian prelate of the Catholic Church, who served as Archivist and Librarian of the Holy Roman Church from September 2022 to March 2025. He was the Secretary of the Congregation for Catholic Education, its second-highest officer, from November 2012 to September 2022 after serving as its third-highest official for ten years. He has been an archbishop since 2013.

== Biography ==
Zani was born in Pralboino, Brescia, Italy, on 24 March 1950. He studied philosophy and theology at the seminary of Brescia, the Pontifical University of Saint Thomas Aquinas, Angelicum and the Pontifical Lateran University where he was awarded a doctorate in theology. Zani was ordained to the priesthood on 20 September 1975 by Luigi Morstabilini, Bishop of Brescia. He then attended the Pontifical Gregorian University and earned a license in social science.

He returned to Brescia and served as vice-rector. From 1983 to 1995 he taught at the Salesian Philosophical-Theological Institute and "Sociology of Religion" at the Paul VI Theological Institute.

He assisted in the foundation of the Institute of Religious Studies at the Catholic University of Brescia and taught there from 1990 to 1995. From 1981 to 1995 he served as director at the Diocesan Pastoral Office as well as secretary of the board, and filled other pastoral assignments. During these years Zani was also director of the Episcopal Conference of Lombardy for the pastoral care of the schools. From 1995 to 2002, he was director of the National Bureau of Education of the Italian Episcopal Conference.

On 7 January 2002, Pope John Paul II named him Under-Secretary of the Congregation for Catholic Education, its third-highest official.

On 9 November 2012, Pope Benedict XVI appointed him Secretary of the Congregation for Catholic Education, its second-highest officer, and Titular Archbishop of Volturnum. And on 15 December, Benedict named him a consultant to the Congregation for the Doctrine of the Faith. He received his episcopal consecration from Benedict on 6 January 2013. He chose as his motto "Unus Magister Vester" ('You Have One Teacher') from Matthew 23:8.

On 30 November 2013, Pope Francis confirmed Zani in his position as Secretary of the Congregation. On 16 July 2014, Francis appointed Zani to a five-year term as a consultant to the Congregation for Institutes of Consecrated Life and Societies of Apostolic Life.

As Secretary, he often served as spokesperson for the Congregation. For example, in May 2014 he acknowledged the Congregation was reviewing a complaint filed by author William Blatty against Georgetown University; in January 2018, he discussed the apostolic constitution Veritatis gaudium and its restructuring of theological education; and in May 2018, he discussed new norms for education in canon law with respect to marriage annulments. He also participated in international conferences, for example in Rwanda and Thailand.

In a January 2018 speech in Calabria, he outlined some of the requirements of contemporary theological education: the need to avoid narrow conversations—"the theology of the little table"—and instead speak to human concerns by respecting "the anthropological perspective of faith". He said the times require a "differentiated catechesis, especially at the popular level"; the use of "a pastoral language in step with the times", and the courage to exercise its role in public debates to "arouse renewed social vigor".

On 26 September 2022, he was named archivist and librarian of the Holy Roman Church.

Pope Francis appointed Archbishop Giovanni Cesare Pagazzi, until then Secretary of Dicastery of Culture and Education, as his successor.

Catholic Church titles
Preceded by Jean-Louis Bruguès, OP	Secretary of the Congregation for Catholic Education; 9 November 2012–26 September 2022	Succeeded by vacant
