= Giovanni Cesare Pagazzi =

Italian Catholic prelate and academic

The Most Reverend Giovanni Cesare Pagazzi
- Archivist and Librarian of the Holy Roman Church
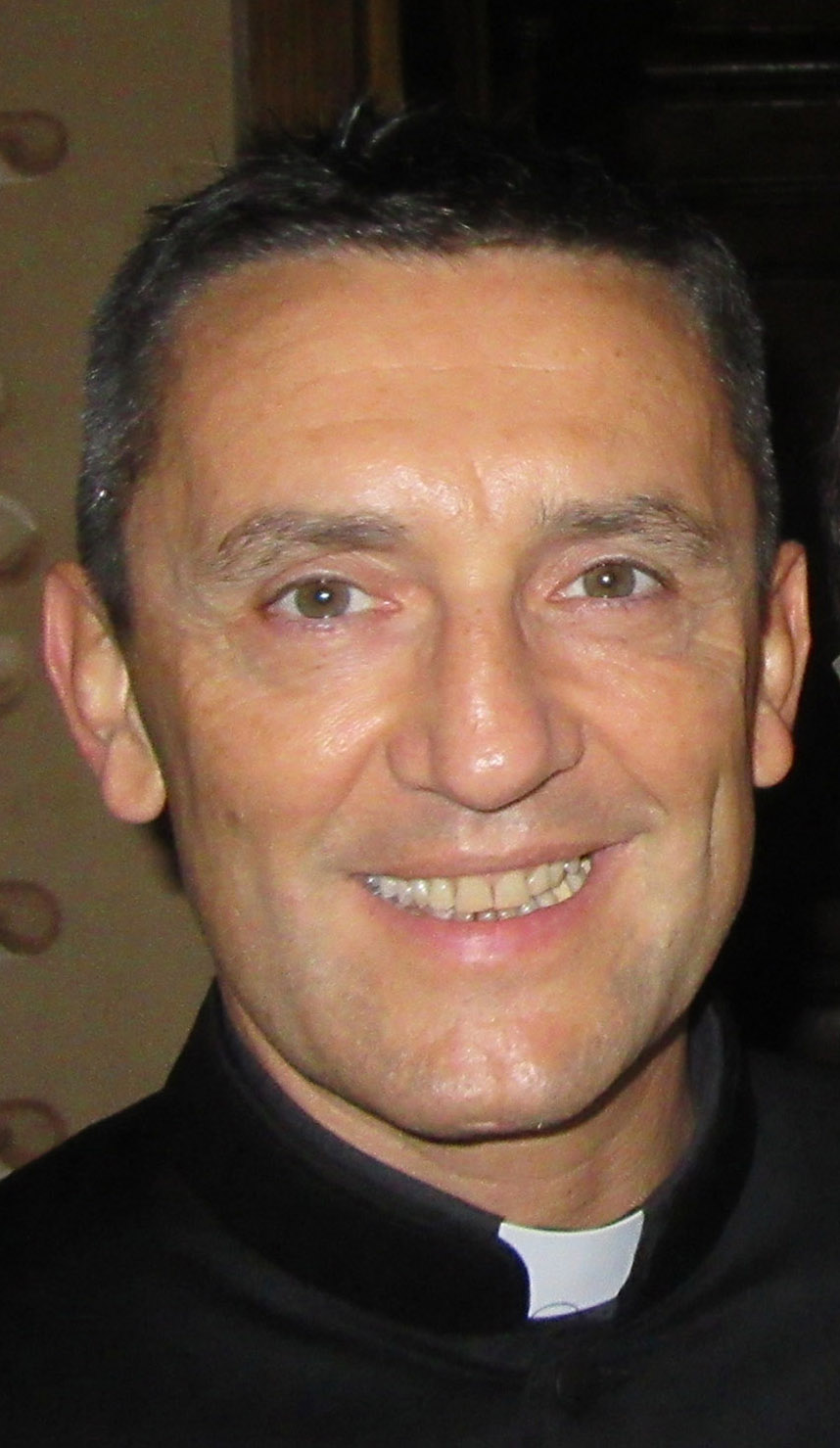
- Church: Roman Catholic Church
- Appointed: 28 March 2025
- Predecessor: Angelo Vincenzo Zani
- Other post: Titular archbishop of Belcastro
- Previous post: Secretary of the Dicastery for Culture and Education (2022–25)

Orders
- Ordination: 23 June 1990
- Consecration: 10 February 2024

Personal details
- Born: 8 June 1965 (age 61) Crema, Italy
- Coat of arms: Giovanni Cesare Pagazzi's coat of arms

Styles of Giovanni Cesare Pagazzi
- Reference style: His Excellency, The Most Reverend
- Spoken style: Your Excellency
- Religious style: Bishop

Giovanni Cesare Pagazzi, known as don Cesare (born 8 June 1965) is an Italian academic and Catholic prelate who was secretary of the Dicastery for Culture and Education, part of the Roman Curia, from September 2022 to March 2025, when he was appointed Archivist and Librarian of the Holy Roman Church. On 9 May 2025, Pope Leo XIV confirmed him in this charge. He has been an archbishop since February 2024.

== Biography ==
Born in Crema on 8 June 1965, he attended the Maria Santissima Bambina Institute in Lodi. From 1983 to 1990, he studied philosophy and theology in the joint seminary of Crema and Lodi, an affiliate of the Theological Faculty of Northern Italy.

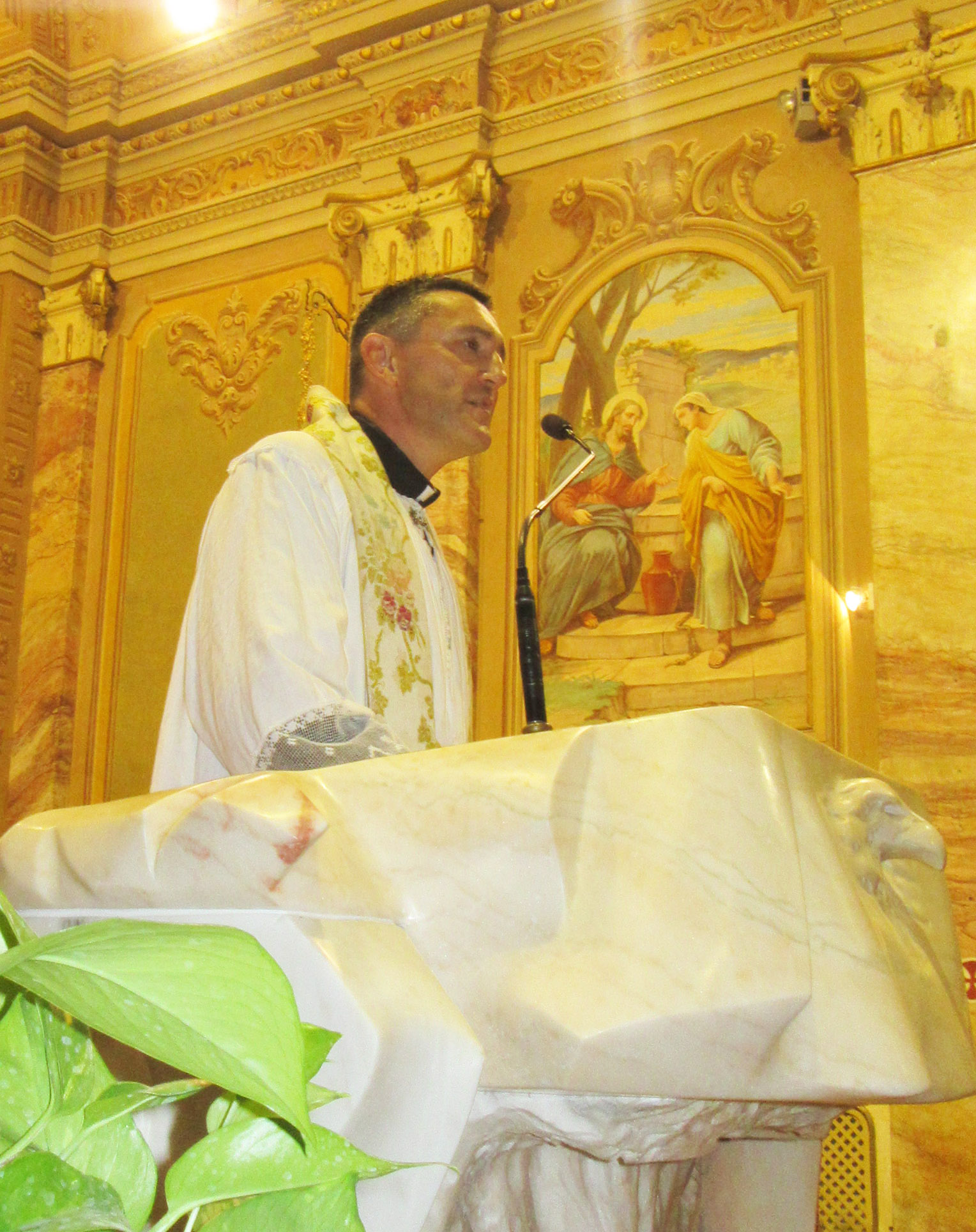
Cesare Pagazzi in Caselle Landi, October 2018

On 23 June 1990 he was ordained a priest for the diocese of Lodi. He obtained his licentiate in 1994 and his doctorate in theology in 1996 at the Pontifical Gregorian University with a thesis entitled "The uniqueness of Jesus as a criterion of unity and difference in the Church" under the direction of Ángel Antón.

He became professor of ecclesiology and Christology at the United Theological Studies of the seminaries of Crema and Lodi in September 1996. From 2013 to 2014, he was a visiting professor at the Pontifical Gregorian University. In addition to his academic activity, Pagazzi was responsible for the training of permanent deacons in the diocese of Lodi from November 2009 to September 2023.

In October 2019, he became professor of theology at the John Paul II Pontifical Theological Institute for Marriage and Family Sciences. There he helped organize an art exhibit devoted to the work of the Brazilian Franciscan Sidival Fila. He has directed the Gaudium et Spes program and taught a course that viewed literature, music, art, and cinema as expressions of family dynamics.

He has been a consultor of the Dicastery for the Doctrine of the Faith since October 2021.

Pope Francis named him secretary of Dicastery for Culture and Education on 26 September 2022, as Cardinal José Tolentino de Mendonça was named prefect of that dicastery. On 30 November 2023, Pope Francis appointed him titular archbishop of Belcastro. His episcopal consecration is scheduled for 10 February 2024 in Lodi.

On 28 March 2025, Pope Francis appointed him Vatican archivist and librarian of the Holy Roman Church. On 9 May 2025 Pope Leo XIV confirmed him in this charge.

His theological writings include works in a popular vein as well. In The Cooking of the Risen One (2014), he explores Jesus' use of food in parables and his relationships, as well as his knowledge of food preparation. Pagazzi wrote: "A careful reading of the Gospel shows us not only Jesus' liking for conviviality, but also his excellent knowledge of and production and preparation of food. He knew even the precise dose of yeast to be added to flour in making bread." (Matthew 13:33) In In pace e mi corico: il sonno e la fede (In peace and my bed: sleep and faith), he considers how the Scripture considers "sleep, insomnia, drowsiness and laziness, to the night, to dreams", and considers the faith that allows for restful sleep.

== Selected writings ==
His published works include:

- Giovanni Cesare Pagazzi, La singolarità di Gesù come criterio di unità e differenza nella Chiesa, Milano, Glossa, 1997, pp. x, 222, ISBN 978-8871050652.
- Giovanni Cesare Pagazzi, Il polso della verità. Memoria e dimenticanza per dire Gesù, Assisi, Cittadella, 2006, pp. 136, ISBN 978-8830808386.
- Giovanni Cesare Pagazzi, Il prete oggi. Tracce di spiritualità, Bologna, EDB, 2010, pp. 88, ISBN 978-8810512036.
- Giovanni Cesare Pagazzi, Sentirsi a casa. Abitare il mondo da figli, Bologna, EDB, 2010, pp. 128, ISBN 978-8810405963.
- Giovanni Cesare Pagazzi, C'è posto per tutti. Legami fraterni, paura, fede, Milano, Vita e Pensiero, 2013, pp. 136, ISBN 978-8834325162.
- Giovanni Cesare Pagazzi, Fatte a mano. L'affetto di Cristo per le cose, Bologna, EDB, 2013, pp. 128, ISBN 978-8810408377.
- Giovanni Cesare Pagazzi, La cucina del Risorto. Gesù «cuoco» per l'umanità affamata, Bologna, EMI, 2014, pp. 64, ISBN 978-8830722149.
- Giovanni Cesare Pagazzi, In principio era il legame. Sensi e bisogni per dire Gesù, Assisi, Cittadella, 2015, pp. 168, ISBN 978-8830807785.
- Giovanni Cesare Pagazzi, Questo è il mio corpo. La grazia del Signore Gesù, Bologna, EDB, 2016, pp. 136, ISBN 978-8810412190.
- Giovanni Cesare Pagazzi, Gesù mio perdona le nostre colpe..., Milano, Glossa, 2016, pp. 48, ISBN 978-8871053677.

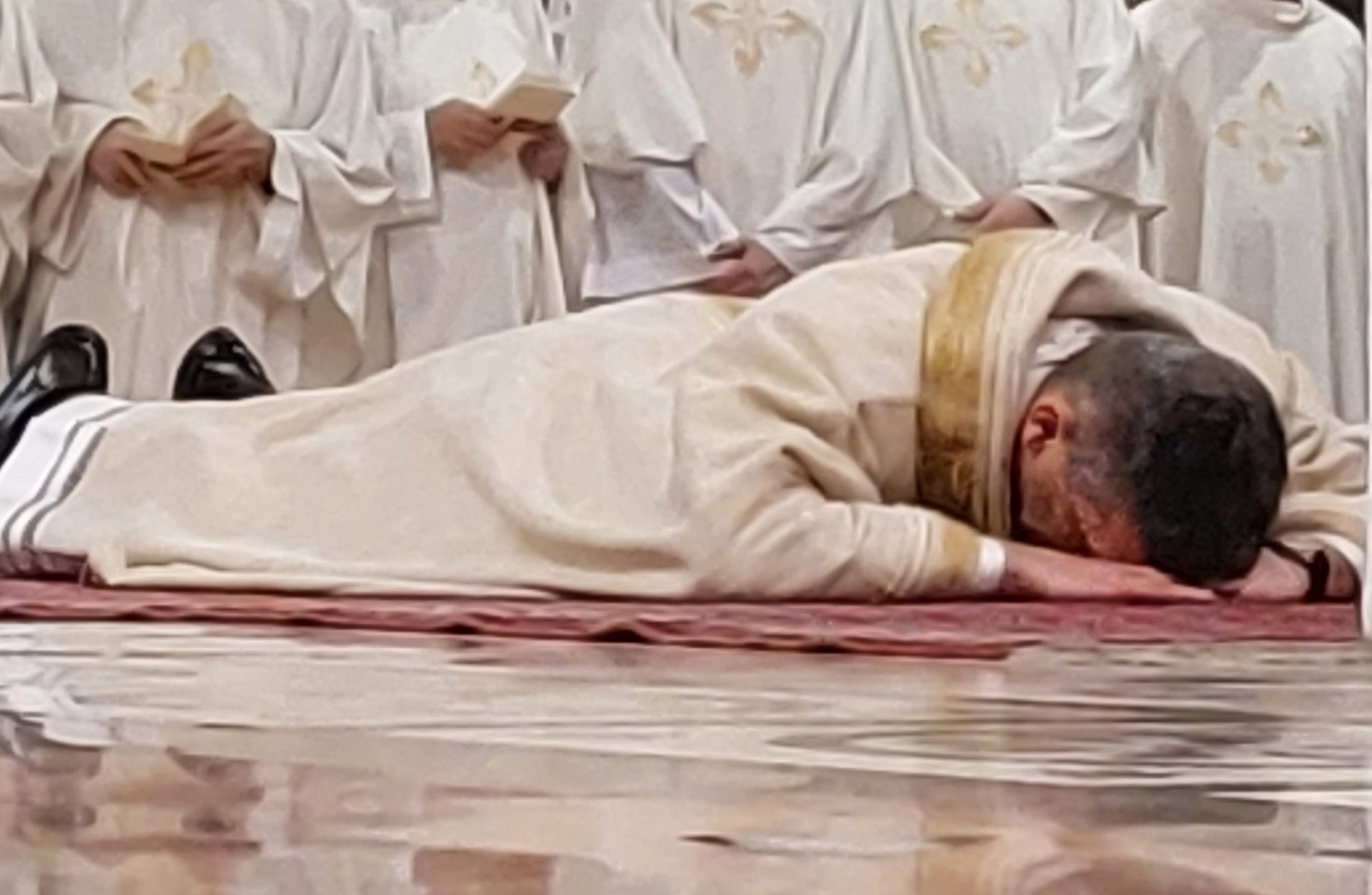
Cesare Pagazzi during his episcopal ordination, 10 February 2024

- Giovanni Cesare Pagazzi, Matteo Crimella, Stefano Romanello, Extra ironiam nulla salus. Studi in onore di Roberto Vignolo in occasione del suo LXX compleanno, Milano, Glossa, 2016, pp. 690, ISBN 978-8871053769.
- Giovanni Cesare Pagazzi, Il garbo del vincitore, Milano, Paoline Editoriale Libri, 2018, pp. 80, ISBN 978-8831549592.
- Giovanni Cesare Pagazzi, La carne, Cinisello Balsamo, San Paolo Edizioni, 2018, pp. 96, ISBN 978-8892213999.
- Giovanni Cesare Pagazzi, Tua è la potenza. Fidarsi della forza di Cristo, Cinisello Balsamo, San Paolo Edizioni, 2019, pp. 160, ISBN 978-8892220478.
- Giovanni Cesare Pagazzi, Carla Canullo, Madri, Bologna, EDB, 2020, pp. 88, ISBN 978-8810572023.
- Giovanni Cesare Pagazzi, In pace mi corico. Il sonno e la fede, Cinisello Balsamo, San Paolo Edizioni, 2021, pp. 176, ISBN 978-8892226562.
- Giovanni Cesare Pagazzi, Franco Manzi, Il pastore dell'essere. Fenomenologia dello sguardo del Figlio, Assisi, Cittadella, 2021, pp. 168, ISBN 978-8830807297.
