= Congregation for Catholic Education =

Former dicastery of the Roman Curia

Congregation for Catholic Education (for Educational Institutions)
- Latin: Congregatio de Institutione Catholica (Studiorum Institutis)
- Coat of arms of the Holy See

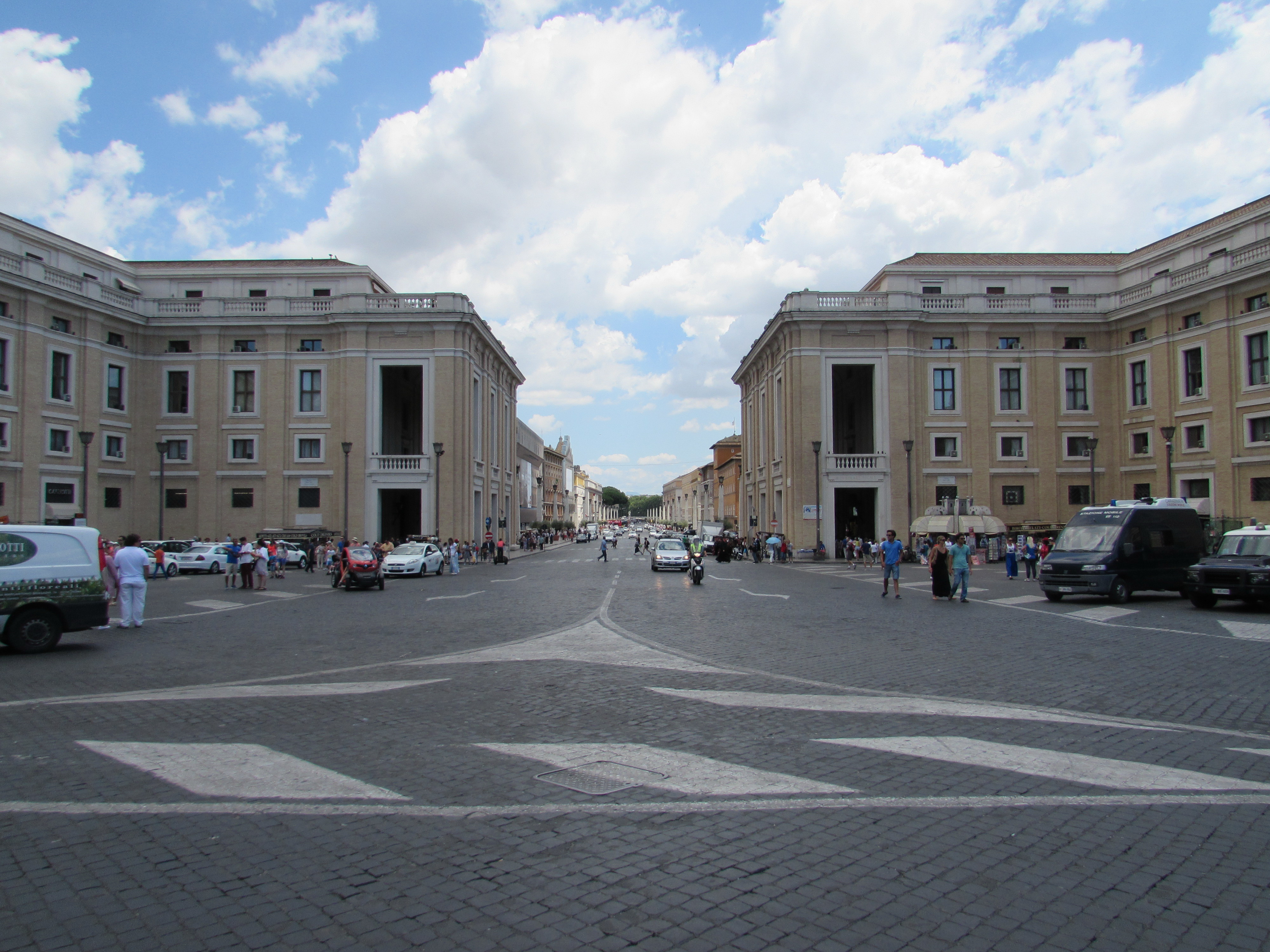
- Palazzo delle Congregazioni in Piazza Pio XII (in front of St. Peter's Square) is the workplace for most congregations of the Roman Curia

Congregation overview
- Formed: January 22, 1588
- Preceding agencies: Congregatio pro universitate studii romani; Congregatio studiorum; Congregatio de Seminariis et Studiorum Universitatibus; Sacra Congregatio pro institutione Catholica; Congregation for Catholic Education (for Seminaries and Institutes of Study)
- Dissolved: May 5, 2022
- Superseding Congregation: Dicastery for Culture and Education
- Type: Congregation
- Headquarters: Palazzo delle Congregazioni, Piazza Pio XII, Rome, Italy
- Website: http://www.educatio.va/

The Congregation for Catholic Education (Institutes of Study) (Latin: Congregatio de Institutione Catholica (Studiorum Institutis)) was the pontifical congregation of the Roman Curia responsible for: universities, faculties, institutes and higher schools of study, either ecclesial or non-ecclesiastical dependent on ecclesial persons; and schools and educational institutes depending on ecclesiastical authorities.

It was also in charge of regulating seminaries, which prepare those students intending to become priests (seminarians) for ordination to the presbyterate, until 16 January 2013 when Pope Benedict XVI transferred the oversight of seminaries and all other related formation programs for priests and deacons from this dicastery to the Congregation for the Clergy, which regulates deacons and priests generally, not only their education. The Congregation for Catholic Education retains responsibility for matters pertaining to the structure of seminary curricula in philosophy and theology, in consultation with the Congregation for the Clergy.

When the Apostolic constitution Praedicate evangelium promulgated by Pope Francis took effect on 5 May 2022, the Congregation for Catholic Education was merged with the Pontifical Council for Culture to create the new Dicastery for Culture and Education.

== History ==
Pope Sixtus V created the forerunner of the Congregation in 1588 with the Constitution Immensa, to oversee the University of Rome La Sapienza and other notable universities of the time, including Bologna, Paris, and Salamanca. In 1824 Pope Leo XII created the Congregatio studiorum for educational institutions in the Papal States, which in 1870 began to oversee Catholic universities. Pope Pius X confirmed this responsibility in 1908 and Pope Benedict XV erected in 1915 the section for seminaries (which existed within the Consistorial Congregation), joined to it the Congregatio studiorum, and called it Congregatio de Seminariis et Studiorum Universitatibus. In 1967, Pope Paul VI renamed it Sacra Congregatio pro institutione Catholica. The present name "Congregation for Catholic Education (Institutes of Study)" derives from Pope John Paul II's 1988 Apostolic Constitution Pastor Bonus.

== Offices ==
To fulfill its mission, this congregation has two offices:

1. The Office for Universities (Higher Education) with the sub-section Department for International Organizations (Dipartimento per gli Organismi Internazionali or DOI). This Office has competence over:

- Ecclesiastical, which are governed by Pope Francis' Apostolic Constitution Veritatis Gaudium (29 January 2018) (replacing the previous constitution, Sapientia christiana of 1979) and which are tasked "to carry out the ministry of evangelization given to the Church by Christ" by "fostering and teaching sacred doctrine and the sciences connected therewith", for example Theology, Philosophy, and Canon Law, (Veritatis Gaudium, articles I-II); and
- Non-ecclesiastical offerings in secular sciences that are dependent on ecclesiastical persons, which are governed by John Paul II's Apostolic Constitution Ex corde Ecclesiae (15 August 1990) as well as by the pertinent civil laws of countries in which they are located.

2. The Office for Schools.

== Competences on Ecclesiastical Higher Education Institutions ==
The Congregation conducts apostolic visits to Catholic institutions and receives bishops during their quinquennial visits ad limina apostolorum, in order to discuss with local Ordinaries concerns pertaining to Catholic Education in their areas of responsibility.

The Congregation for Catholic Education "erects or approves ecclesiastical universities and institutions, ratifies their statutes, exercises the highest supervision over them, and ensures that the integrity of the Catholic faith is preserved in teaching doctrine." Corollary to this, the dicastery nominates or confirms highest personal academic authorities of Ecclesiastical higher Education institutions, i.e., rectors, presidents and deans. Names of confirmed and appointed rectors, presidents and deans of Institutions belonging to the Higher Education System of the Holy See appear in the Annuario Pontificio at the section on Istituti di Studi Superiori. These are updated yearly.

To this dicastery belongs also the final authority for the nomination of teachers of ecclesiastical learning institutions to the permanent status and to the highest rank of Ordinaries of the various cathedrae of ecclesiastical disciplines, through the issuance of the rescript granting the nihil obstat for such promotion, on behalf of the Holy See.

Academic collaboration (for the purpose of obtaining the authority to grant canonical degrees in the name of the Holy See) between Ecclesiastical Higher Education institutions that do not have the juridical status as autonomous Ecclesiastical Faculties (i.e., Affiliated, Aggregated, and Incorporated Institutes) and autonomous Ecclesiastical Faculties have to be approved by this dicastery.

The programmes and other conditions required of Higher Learning Institutions belonging the Higher Education System of the Holy See are regulated by the Apostolic Constitutions Sapientia christiana, and other pertinent normative documents of the dicastery, such as:

1. Decree of the Congregation for Catholic Education revising the order of studies in the Faculties and Departments of Canon Law (2 September 2002);

2. The Reform of the Higher Institutes of Religious Sciences (28 June 2008), which gives the appropriate norms regarding the pathway of the study of Philosophy and Theology for those who are not preparing to receive the Holy Orders, i.e., for the lay and religious;

3. The Decree on the Reform of Ecclesiastical Studies of Philosophy (28 January 2011), which outlines the current requirements of Ecclesiastical Studies of Philosophy and of the philosophical formation that forms integral part of the Cycle I of Catholic Theology;

4. The normative documents for affiliations, aggregations and incorporations.

== National Qualifications Framework of the Ecclesiastical Higher Education System of the Holy See ==
The Holy See is signatory to various international and regional agreements in recognition of diplomas and degrees in the field of Higher Education, such as the Lisbon Convention and the Asia-Pacific Regional Convention on the Recognition of Qualifications in Higher Education (2011). As part of the process of implementing these international accords, the Congregation for Catholic Education has followed international guidelines, such as those recommended by the Bologna Process, in order to make transparent its Higher Education System. Among the instruments of this process is the National Qualifications Framework, to which all institutions belonging to the System must conform in order to legitimately and validly grant canonical degrees.

== Leadership ==
Cardinal Giuseppe Versaldi had been the Prefect of the Congregation for Catholic Education since 31 March 2015. Archbishop Angelo Vincenzo Zani has been the Secretary since 9 November 2012. Father Friedrich Bechina, FSO, has been the Undersecretary.

=== Prefects since 1915 ===
- Gaetano Bisleti (1915-1937)
- Giuseppe Pizzardo (1939-1968)
- Gabriel-Marie Garrone (1968-1980)
- William Wakefield Baum (1980-1990)
- Pio Laghi (pro-prefect 1990-1991, prefect 1991-1999)
- Zenon Grocholewski (1999-2015)
- Giuseppe Versaldi (2015-2022)

=== Secretaries since 1913 ===
- Giacomo Sinibaldi (15 May 1913 – 1928)
- Ernesto Ruffini (28 October 1928 – 11 October 1945)
- Giuseppe Rossino (1945 – 31 December 1949)
- Carlo Confalonieri (25 January 1950 – 15 December 1958)
- Dino Staffa (18 December 1958 – 7 April 1967)
- Joseph Schröffer (17 May 1967 – 20 May 1976)
- Antonio María Javierre Ortas, S.D.B. (20 May 1976 – 26 May 1988)
- José Saraiva Martins, C.M.F. (26 May 1988 – 30 May 1998)
- Giuseppe Pittau, S.J. (11 July 1998 – 25 November 2003)
- John Michael Miller, C.S.B. (25 November 2003 – 1 June 2007)
- Jean-Louis Bruguès, O.P. (10 November 2007 – 26 June 2012)
- Angelo Vincenzo Zani (9 November 2012 – 5 June 2022)

== Documents published by the Congregation for Catholic Education ==
- Decree on the Reform of Ecclesiastical Studies of Philosophy (2011)
- Guidelines on the Use of Psychology in the Admission and Formation of Candidates for the Priesthood (2008)
- Reform of the Higher Institutes of Religious Sciences (2008)
- Educating Together in Catholic Schools. A Shared Mission between Consecrated Persons and the Lay Faithful (2007)
- Instruction Concerning the Criteria for the Discernment of Vocations with regard to Persons with Homosexual Tendencies in view of their Admission to the Seminary and to Holy Orders (2005)

The complete list of documents pertaining to Catholic Education can be accessed at this link.
