= Vatican Splendors =

Touring exhibit of religious and historical objects from the Vatican

Vatican Splendors: A Journey Through Faith and Art is a touring exhibit of religious and historical objects from the Vatican, some of them nearly two thousand years old. In 2010-11, the exhibit toured six cities in the U.S.: Cleveland, St. Paul, St. Petersburg, St. Louis, Pittsburgh, and Fort Lauderdale, and continued to São Paulo, Brazil.

The exhibit includes armor, art, sculptures, relics of the saints, and papal objects. Penn Bullock wrote in the Miami New Times, "next year marks the 500th anniversary of Michelangelo's ascent to the ceiling of the Sistine Chapel, where he painted the world's most celebrated fresco. It's also the anniversary of the Catholic Church's Swiss Guard, the Vatican museums, and St. Peter's Basilica. To commemorate the occasion of its total institutional domination of Europe's art and culture, the Vatican will display many of its relics and valuables in a traveling exhibition."

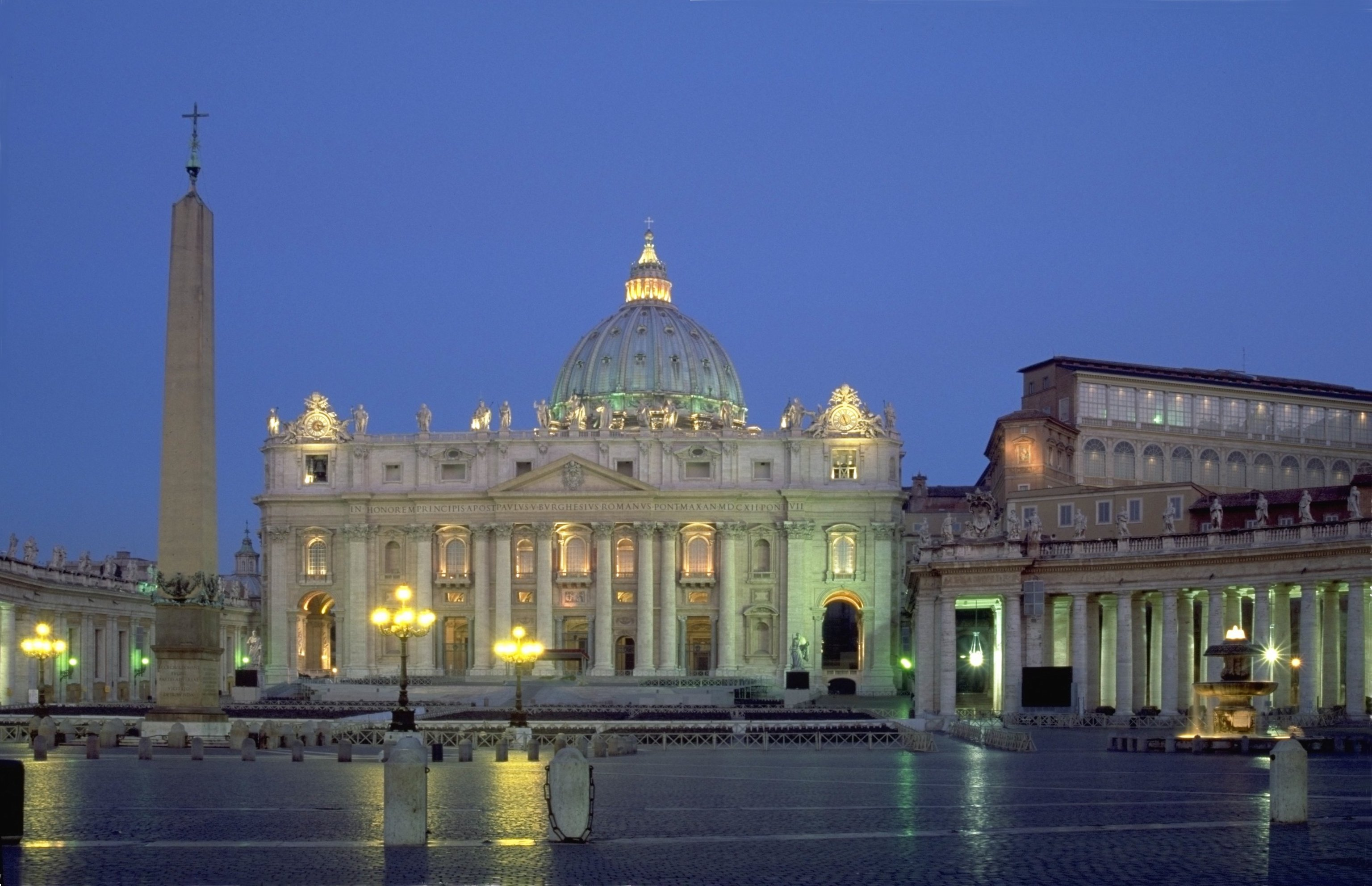
St Peters Basilica, Vatican City

Vatican Splendors is an exhibit of armor, art from master artists, sculptures, relics of the saints, and papal belongings. As explained on its website, Vatican Splendors allows one to experience two thousand years of Vatican art and history through two hundred featured items. The exhibit is divided into ten galleries, taking viewers on a visual and auditory journey "through the ages of artistic expression and religious iconography." These galleries consist of Early Christian Dialogue Between Faith and Art; The rise of Christian Rome; The Early Renaissance; Michelangelo; The Renaissance Basilica; Art in the Service of Faith; The Art of the Liturgy; Dialogue with the World; The successors of Peter—Papal Portraiture; and Art and the Contemporary Papacy. The Vatican Splendors' website recognizes this exhibit as "one of the largest collections to ever tour North America." Many of these artifacts were loaned by the Vatican Museums and have never been viewed by the public in or outside the Vatican.

Viewers traverse Vatican Splendors on a self-guided tour beginning with an introductory video before entering the first gallery, which holds some historical pieces from Saint Peter's tomb. Moving onwards, viewers will encounter many historical artifacts including paintings from the masters, and the tools that they actually used during their life. In the Miami New Times, Bullock describes the display as follows. "[T]hree institutions that will be graced with the church's 700-year-old Giotto paintings and Gian Lorenzo Bernini baroque sculptures. The only thing better than this collection would be a tour of the Vatican vaults. Among the 200-plus priceless artifacts – many never exhibited before – are papal jewels; bone fragments belonging to Saint Peter and Saint Paul; personal effects of Pope John Paul II; and swords, armor, and uniforms of the papal Swiss Guard. Most stunningly, however, is the inclusion of the compass and tools Michelangelo used at the Sistine Chapel."

== Michelangelo ==
At the entrance of the fourth gallery is The Creation of Adam, a replica from the ceiling of the Sistine Chapel. It is displayed in a walkway that contains a dome shaped roof immediately above the viewers' heads. Gazing upwards, people are placed momentarily back into Michelangelo's world when he initially painted it. "Originally commissioned to paint the Twelve Apostles against a starry sky, [Michelangelo] lobbied for a different and more complex scheme." He received his wish. Upon completion, the intricate masterpiece possessed over three hundred figures and nine stories from the Book of Genesis at its center. Michelangelo, however, is not the only master on display. The Madonna of Sassoferrato is also present, and although its image is present on many holiday cards, it has never been exhibited outside of Rome. Complementing this is Guercino's 1622 Portrait of Christ with Crown of Thorns, a painting that has never been shown outside or inside the Vatican. Amidst these paintings are numerous sculptures highlighted by a life size replica Pietà, also completed by Michelangelo at age twenty-four. The exhibit also displays Michelangelo's original architectural drawings, journal entries, and sketches.

== Papal history ==
Further into the exhibit viewers see the personal belongings of popes, including Pope John Paul II's chalice and paten. Upon nearing this presentation, viewers can stand close enough to see his thumb print on the artifacts. Along with these are John Paul II's staff, which he was often seen on television with, and Benedict XVI's fisherman's ring, and many other richly adorned possessions and religious items used by previous popes in the past. "'This is just a taste of all the wealth of art and its beauty the Vatican owns,' said Monsignor Roberto Zagnoli, one of three curators of the Vatican Museums." The most unusual papal artifact there is the bronze sculpture of John Paul II's hands. It is special because it is the only item people are allowed to touch. The papal display is completed with many portraits and busts of the popes as well as a chronological presentation of all the bishops of Rome beginning with Saint Peter and ending with Benedict XVI.

== Rare viewing ==
The Vatican Splendors provides the United States with an exclusive look into the history of the Catholic Church and the inside of the Vatican. Numerous people desire to see these works of art in Rome as well as the rest of the world, as Jaweed Kaleem explains in his article. "Each day, 20,000 visitors line up for hours to catch these masterpieces by names synonymous with beauty -- Michelangelo, Bernini and Guercino, to name a few -- and to get a glimpse into the history of faith and aesthetics." Furthermore, several of the artifacts arranged in the Vatican Splendors would not be shown in Rome. According to Peter Radestsky, "'Even if you go to Rome, you won't see some of these things. They're just not displayed." This statement is reiterated in Kaleem's article. "'There are many objects that have not been on tour before,' says Mark Greenberg, president of Evergreen Exhibitions, a San Antonio company that also put together the prior Vatican exhibit in Fort Lauderdale. 'If you had a chance to go to Rome, you would not see the reliquary with the bones of Sts. Peter and Paul because it is kept in a private chapel in the College of St. Urban,' he says. 'The statues of Sts. Peter, Paul, John and Andrew are new, as is the Guercino painting.'"

== Limited North American tour ==
Although the exhibit was popular it was short-lived due to the Italian law which requires, "that historic art pieces may not leave the state for more than 12 months at a time." This knowledge may have led to the positive reception the exhibition received in the United States. Many people came to view the exhibit. In Pittsburgh it broke attendance records at the Senator John Heinz History Center, and in the Missouri History Museum it came close, attracting 100,000 visitors. The Vatican Splendors exhibit ended its North American tour in Fort Lauderdale, Florida in April 2011 and returned to Rome. Between September 2012 and March 2013 it showed in the "Oca" of Ibirapuera Park, São Paulo, Brazil.
