= A Song for You (disambiguation) =

"A Song for You" is a song by Leon Russell, covered by many artists.

Song for You or A Song for You may also refer to:

== Film and TV ==
- A Song for You (TV series), a Canadian music variety television series
- A Song for You (film), 1933, directed by Joe May

== Music ==
=== Albums ===
- A Song for You (Bizzy Bone album), 2008
- A Song for You (The Carpenters album), 1972
- A Song for You (Ron Carter album), 1978
- A Song for You (Steve Tyrell album), 2018
- A Song for You (The Temptations album), 1975
- A Song for You (alternative title of Andy Williams album), 1971
- Songs for You by Tinashe, 2019

=== Songs ===
- "Song for You" (Chicago song), 1980
- "Song for You" (Misia song), 2005
- "A Song for You" (Roh Ji-hoon song), 2014
- "More Kiss" / "Song for You", by Fairies, 2011
- "Song for You", by Alexi Murdoch from Four Songs
- "Song for You", by Barclay James Harvest from Time Honoured Ghosts
- "Song for You", by Big Time Rush from 24/Seven
- "A Song for You" by Celine Dion from Taking Chances
- "A Song for You", by Gram Parsons from GP
- "Song for You", by The Poodles from Metal Will Stand Tall
- "Song for You", by The Smith Street Band from More Scared of You Than You Are of Me
- "A Song for You", by Whitney Houston from I Look to You

== See also ==
- For You (disambiguation) § Songs
