= Seven Pilgrim Churches of Rome =

Pilgrimage route in Rome

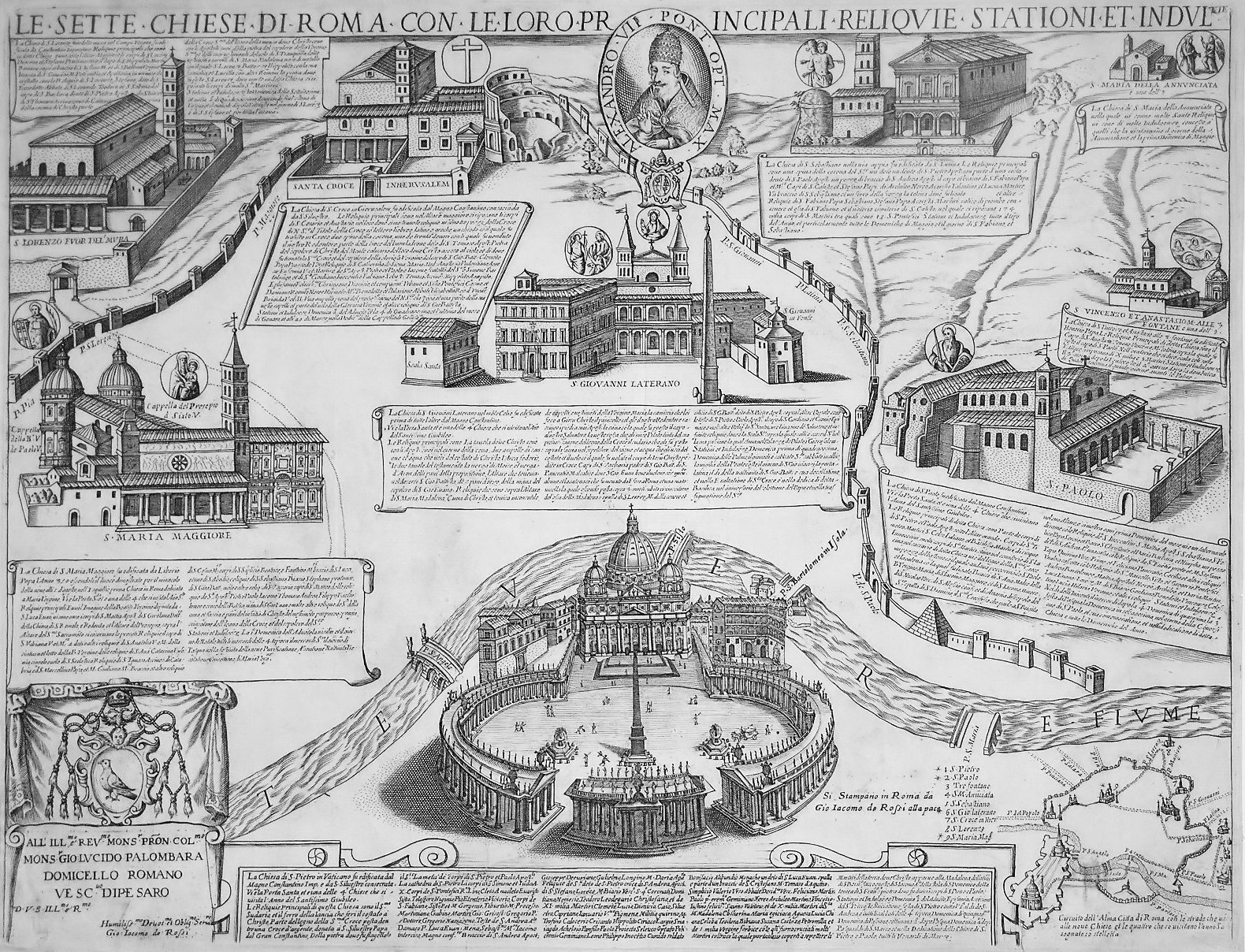
Mid-17th century map showing the Seven Pilgrim Churches of Rome.

As the home of the Pope and the Catholic Curia, as well as the locus of many sites and relics of veneration related to apostles, saints and Christian martyrs, Rome had long been a destination for pilgrims. The Via Francigena was an ancient pilgrim route from England to Rome. It was customary to end the pilgrimage with a visit to the tombs of Saints Peter and Paul. Periodically, some were moved to travel to Rome for the spiritual benefits accrued during a Jubilee. These indulgences sometimes required a visit to a specific church or churches. Pilgrims need not visit each church.

== Origin of the itinerary ==
The tradition of visiting all seven churches was started by St. Philip Neri around 1553 in order to combine conviviality and the sharing of a common religious experience through discovering of the heritage of the early Saints. Neri drew up an itinerary that included visits to St. Peter's Basilica, then St. Paul Outside-the-Walls, St. Sebastian's, St. John Lateran, Holy Cross-in-Jerusalem, St. Lawrence-Outside-the Walls and finally St. Mary Major. He and a few friends and acquaintances would gather before dawn and set out on their walk. At each church, there would be prayer, hymn singing and a brief sermon by Neri.

A simple meal was pre-arranged at the gardens of the Villa Mattei. The Mattei family opened their grounds for pilgrims to rest in and provided them with bread, wine, cheese, eggs, apples and salami. During these "picnics", musicians would play and singers would perform. These pilgrimages were designed to be a counterpoint to the raucous behavior of Carnival.

== Churches ==
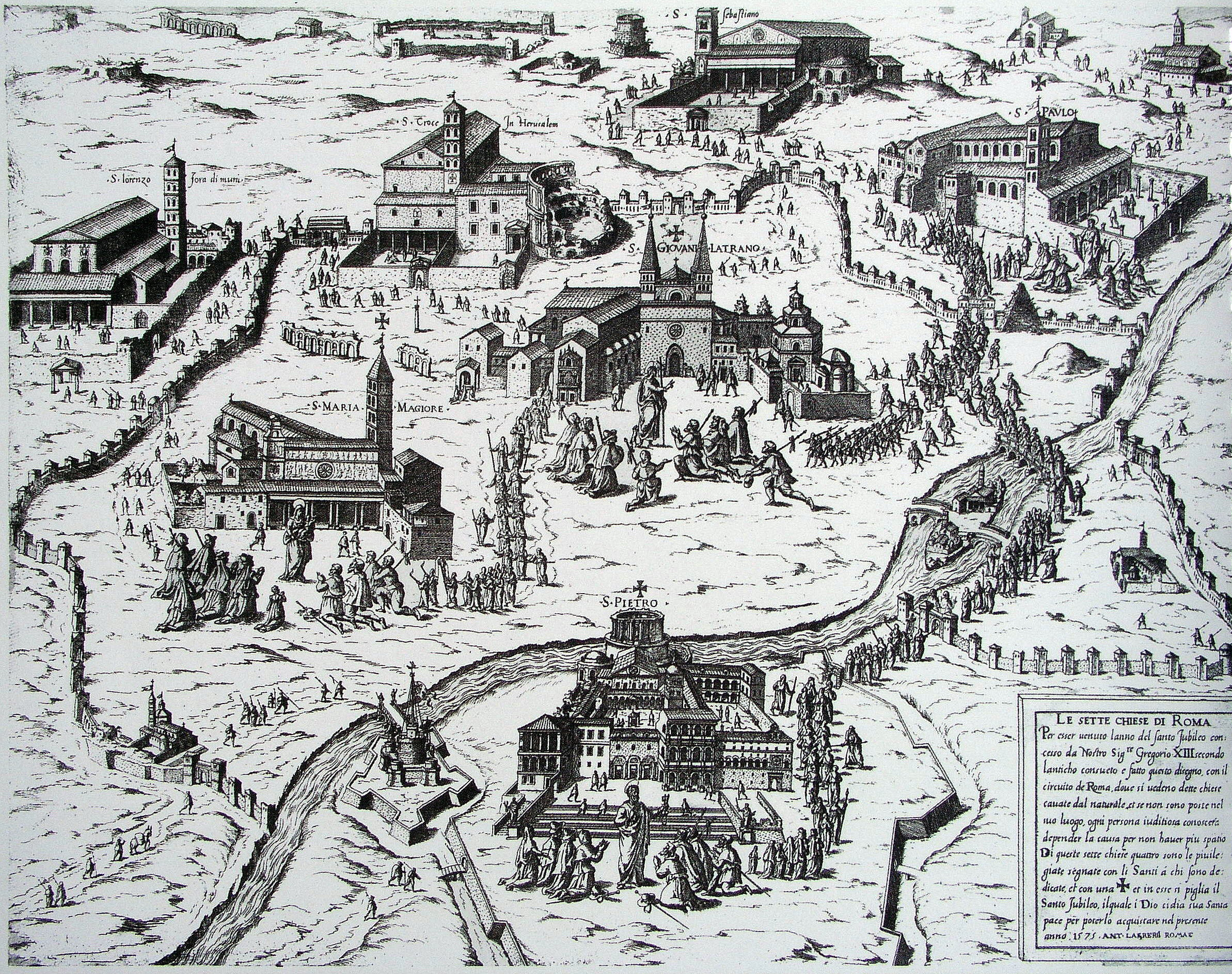
Seven Churches of Rome, copper engraving 1575

There are seven Holy Year churches in Rome (listed according to the order of precedence):

- Archbasilica of Saint John Lateran (Major papal archbasilica)
- Basilica of Saint Peter in the Vatican (Major papal basilica)
- Basilica of Saint Paul Outside the Walls (Major papal basilica)
- Basilica of Saint Mary Major (Major papal basilica)
- Basilica of Saint Lawrence Outside the Walls (Minor papal basilica)
- Basilica of the Holy Cross in Jerusalem (Minor basilica)
- Basilica of Saint Sebastian Outside the Walls (Minor basilica)

Basilica of Saint Peter and the Basilica of Saint Paul were designated as pilgrim churches by Pope Boniface VIII for the first Holy Year in 1300. Pope Clement VI added the Archbasilica of Saint John Lateran in 1350 and Pope Gregory XI added Basilica of Saint Mary Major in 1375. These are the four major papal basilicas in Rome. Each contains a Holy Door, opened only during official Jubilee years.

Sanctuary of Our Lady of Divine Love was added by Pope John Paul II for the Great Jubilee of 2000, replacing St. Sebastian Outside-the-Walls. However, many pilgrims still prefer the pre-2000 seven basilicas and so also attend St. Sebastian's in addition to the ones required for the indulgence, or even instead of the Santuario (given that the walk from the Santuario to the Inner City takes at least a half-day just for itself, and that there is an indulgence for visiting any of the four major basilicas anyway). Some pilgrims walk parts of it and use taxis or public transportation for the rest. - In the 2025 Jubilee, San Sebastiano is featuring as a Pilgrim Church again.

The Seven Church Walk is traditionally done on Wednesday of Holy Week.

There is also a Seven Churches tour in Turkey that visits all seven of the Christian churches mentioned in the Book of Revelation, including the church at Ephesus.

== Classic Seven Pilgrim Churches of Rome ==
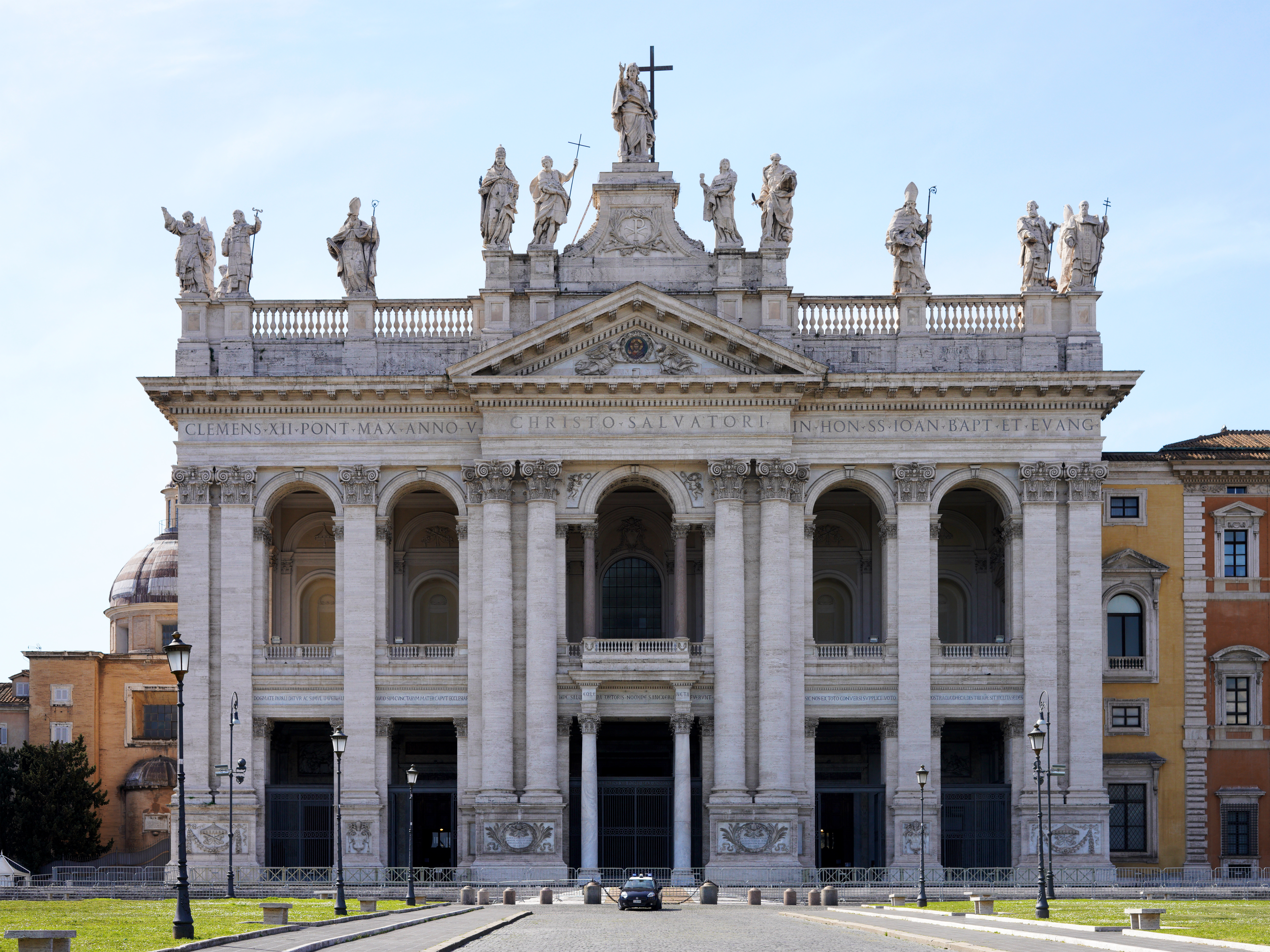
Arcibasilica di San Giovanni in Laterano

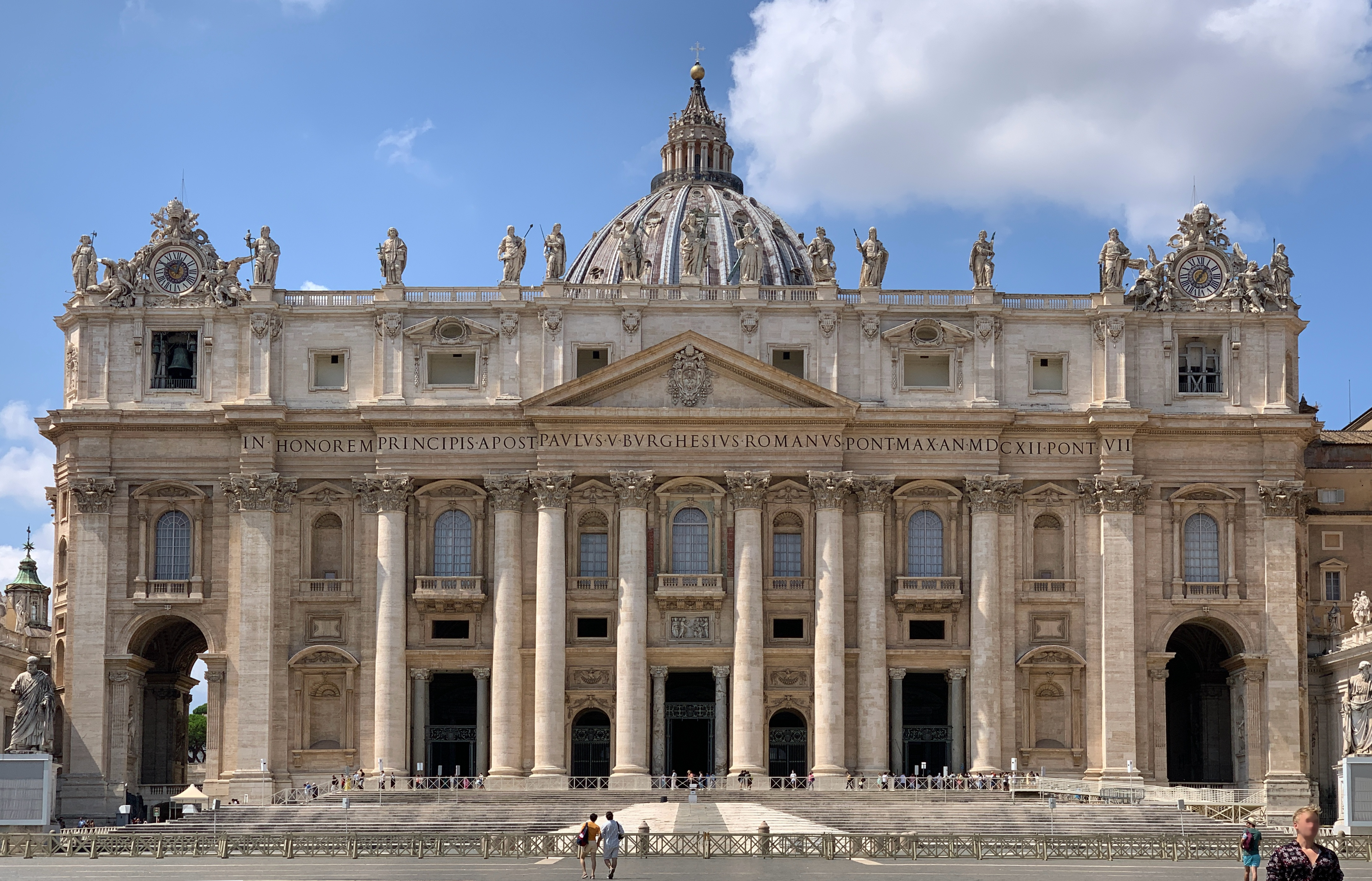
Basilica di San Pietro in Vaticano

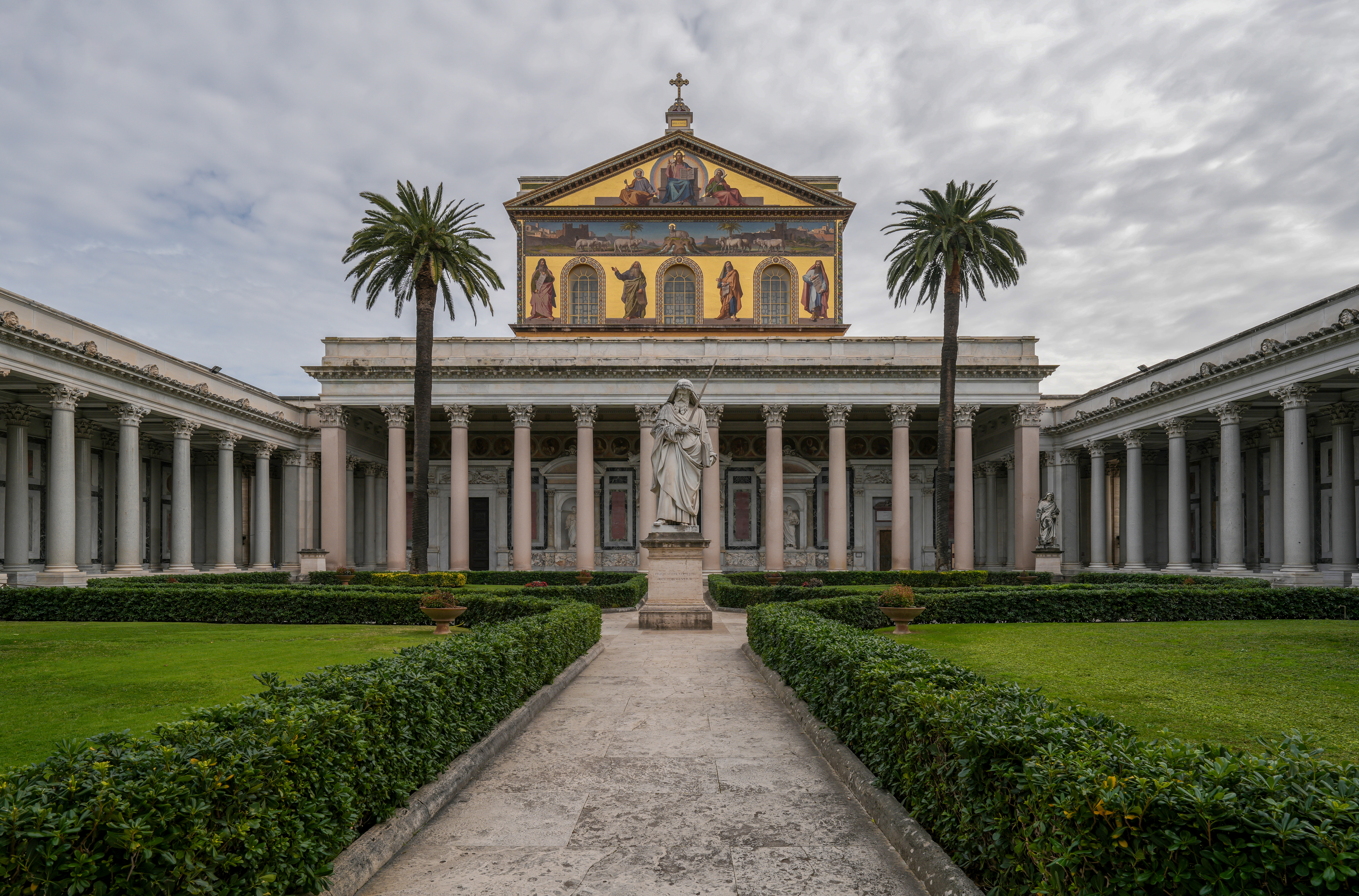
Basilica di San Paolo fuori le mura

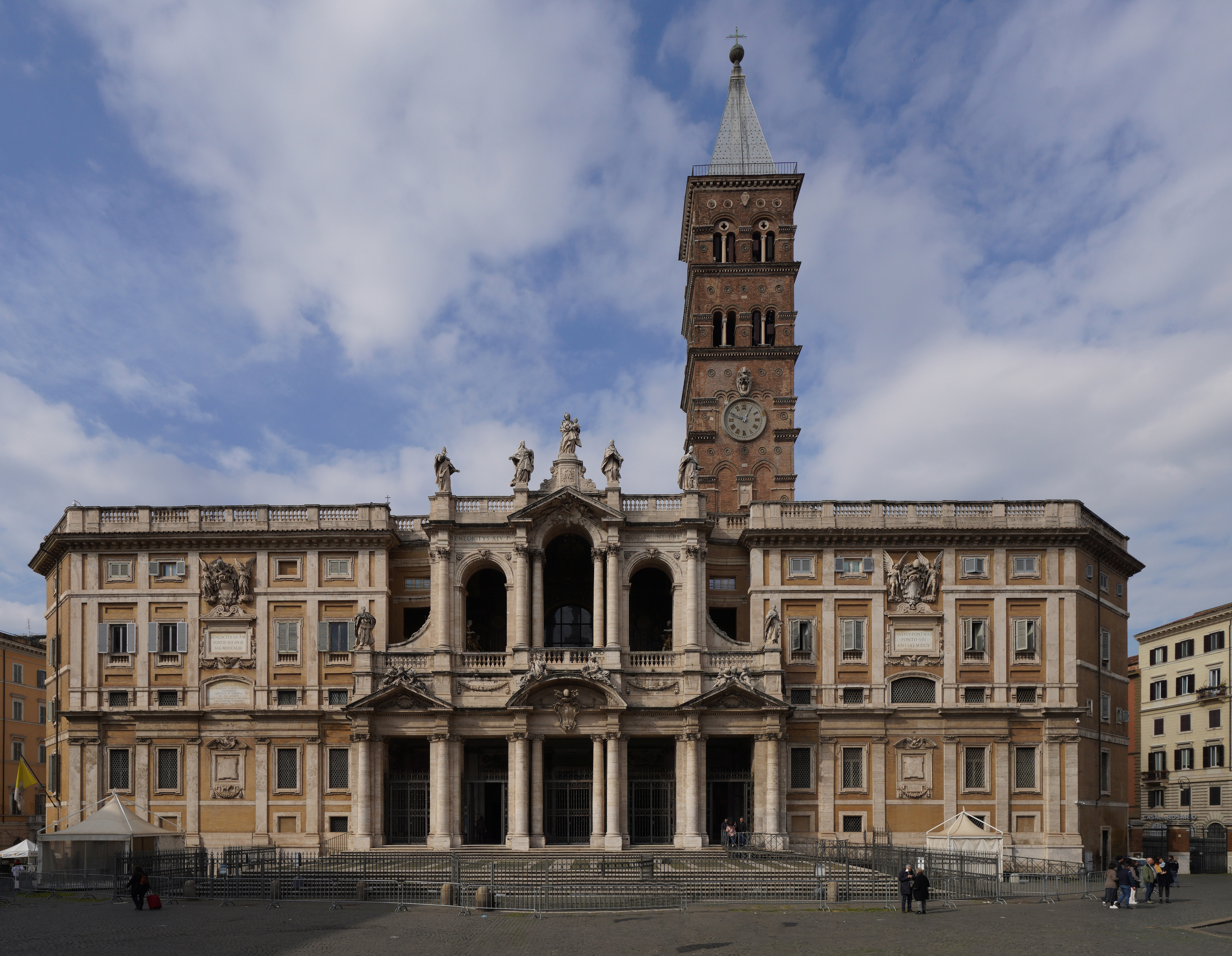
Basilica di Santa Maria Maggiore

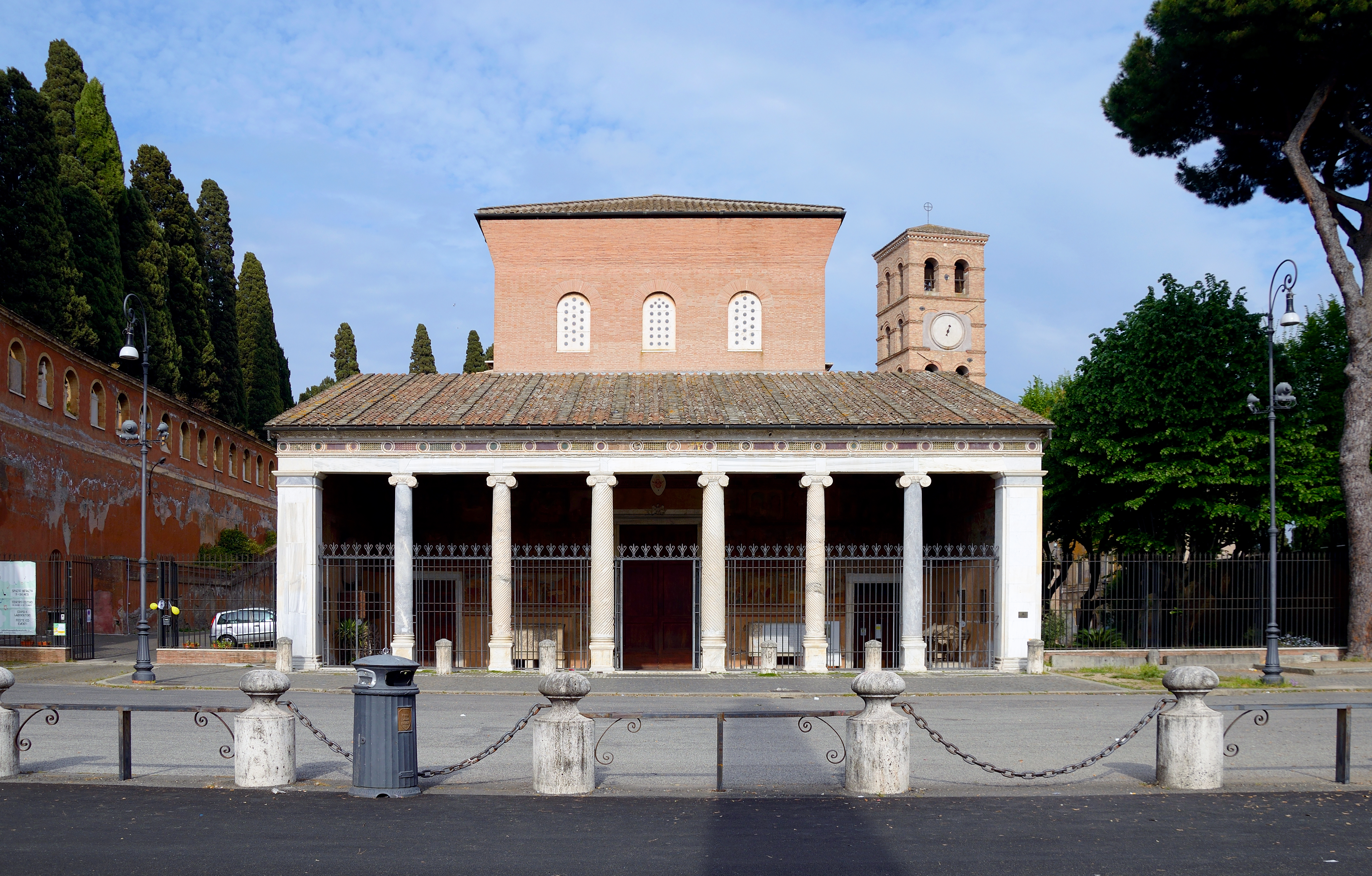
Basilica di San Lorenzo fuori le mura

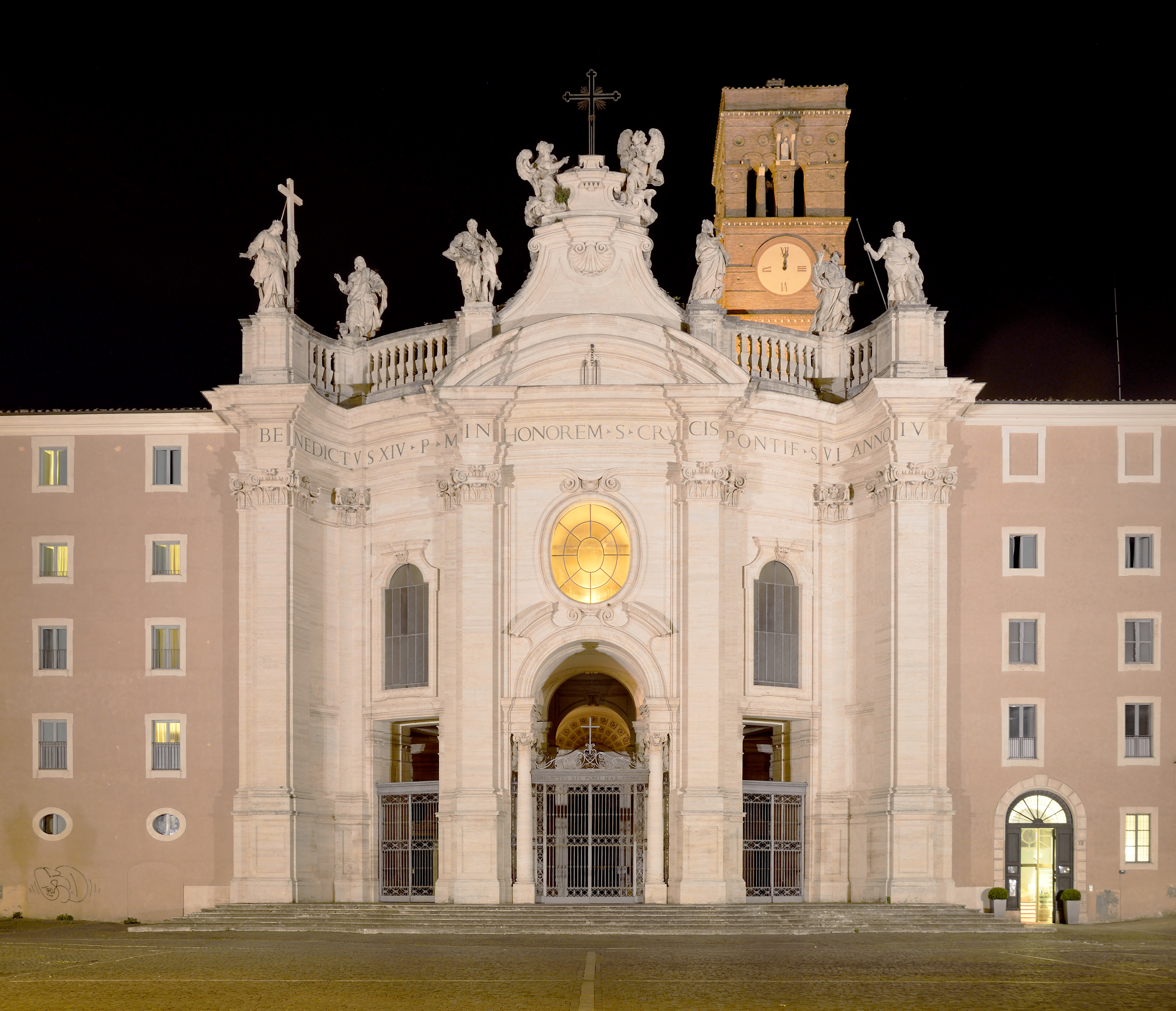
Basilica di Santa Croce di Gerusalemme

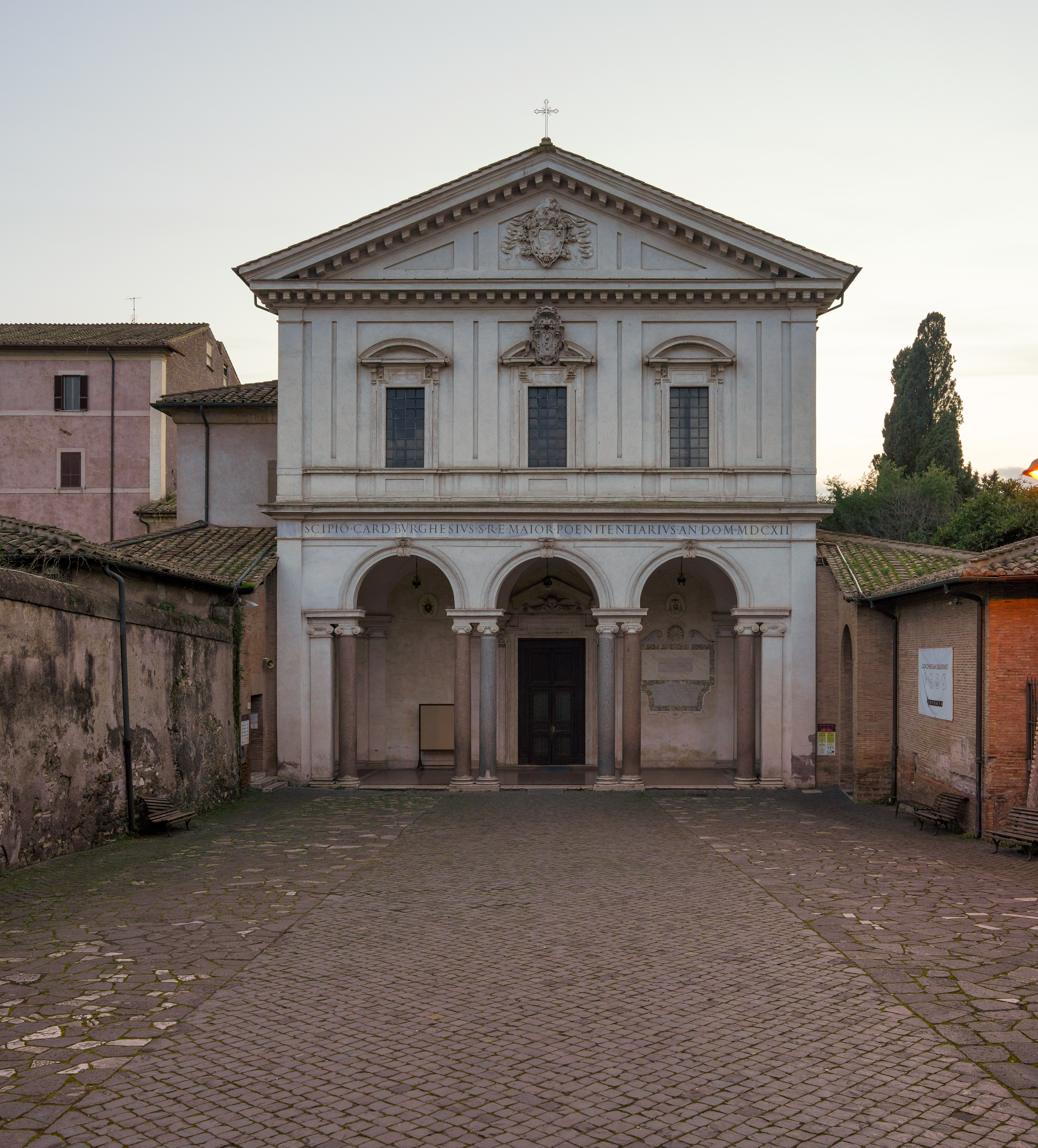
Basilica San Sebastiano fuori le mura

== Guidebooks to Rome ==
Guidebooks have existed since Ancient times. A periplus was a manuscript listing ports and coastal landmarks, in order and with approximate intervening distances, that the captain of a vessel could expect to find along a shore. An itinerarium was an Ancient Roman road map in the form of a showing cities, villages (vici) and other stops, with the intervening distances.

The first such guidebooks for Medieval Rome (mirabilia urbis) were compiled in the 12th century to address the needs of travelers to Rome. The Seven Pilgrim Churches of Rome are listed in the following order in the guide by Franzini (1595): San Giovanni Laterano, St Peter's, San Paolo fuori le mura, Santa Maria Maggiore, San Lorenzo fuori le mura, San Sebastiano, and Santa Croce in Gerusalemme. Giovanni Baglione in his book list nine major churches of Rome, adding somewhat peculiarly the church of Santa Maria Annunziata dei Gonfalone and the trio of churches known once as alle Tre Fontane, and located at the site of St Paul's martyrdom: Santi Vincenzo e Anastasio alle Tre Fontane, Santa Maria Scala Coeli and San Paolo alle Tre Fontane.

Guides prior to the mid-18th century are intended for those on religious pilgrimage, while those afterward include guides for those with a cultural interest in antiquity and art, while maintaining a distance from focus on devotional aspects.

While these continued to have importance, by the 18th century, the storied history as well as its treasures of Italian art, also drew cultural pilgrims on a Grand Tour of Europe that almost always included Rome. Early proponents included Richard Lassels in his 1670 book on a Voyage to Italy. These writings now serve a role in scholarship about the history of Rome, present and past. Among the pre-modern guides or itineraries to Rome, are:

- Mirabilia Urbis Romae (1140s), Anonymous.
- Descriptio urbis Romae (ca.1433), Leon Battista Alberti
- Roma Instaurata, (written 1444 printed 1481), Flavio Biondo
- Franzini, Girolamo (1595). Le cose Maravigliose dell'alma citta de Roma. Guglielmo Facciotto, Rome.
- Gioioso, Antonio Maria (1608). Le cose Maravigliose dell'alma citta de Roma. Guglielmo Facciotto, Rome.
- Anonymous (1670). Guida Angelica Perpetua per visitar le chise, che sono dentro e fuori di Roma. il Moneta, Rome.
- Studio di Pittura scoltura et architettura nelle Chiese di Roma (1674), Abate Filippo Titi.
- Sebastiano, Pietro de' (1683). Viaggio Curioso di Roma Sagra e Profana Gentile, per contentare i Forastieri. il Moneta, Rome.
- Sebastiano, Pietro de' (1683). Viaggio Curioso de' Palazzi e ville più notabile di Roma. il Moneta, Rome.
- Antiquae Notitia or the antiquities of Rome in two parts. (1713), Basil Kennett.
- Indice istorico del gran prospetto di Roma: ovvero Itinerario Istruttivo. (1765) Giuseppe Vasi.
- Nuova Descrizione di Roma Antica e Moderna e de suoi Contorni Volume 1 (1820), Carlo Fea.

== See also ==
- Holy door
- Jubilee in the Catholic Church
- Seven Churches Visitation
- Station days
