= U4 =

U4, U-4, or U04 may refer to:

== Science and technology ==
- U4 spliceosomal RNA, a non-coding RNA component of the major U2-dependent spliceosome
- Haplogroup U4 (mtDNA), a human genetic group
- U4, unitary group of degree 4
- U-47700, a synthetic opioid
- U04, the ICD-10 code for severe acute respiratory syndrome

== Transport ==
- U-Bahn lines
  - U4 (Berlin U-Bahn)
  - U4 (Frankfurt U-Bahn)
  - U4 (Hamburg U-Bahn)
  - U4 (Munich U-Bahn)
  - U4 (Vienna U-Bahn)
- German submarine U-4, one of several German submarines
- London Buses route U4
- U-4, the U.S. Air Force version of the Aero Commander (aircraft), a light twin-engined aircraft from Aero Design and Engineering Company
- U-4, the Japanese air self-defense force designation for the Gulfstream IV aircraft
- U4, PMTair (former) IATA airline designator
- U4, Buddha Air current IATA airline designator

== Other uses ==
- U4, the former name of the Maple League of Universities
- U4, an unemployment figure released by the United States Bureau of Labor Statistics
- Ultima IV: Quest of the Avatar, a video game
- U4 Anti-Corruption Resource Centre en organisasjon under Chr. Michelsens Institutt

== See also ==
- 4U (disambiguation)
