= For You =

For You may refer to:

== Albums ==
- For You (Casey Donovan album), or the title song, 2004
- For You (Frankmusik album), 2015
- For You (Selena Gomez album), 2014
- For You (Eddie Kendricks album), 1974
- For You (Crystal Kay album), 2018
- For You (Philipp Kirkorov album), 2007
- For You (L.T.D. album), or the title song, 1983
- For You (Fatin Shidqia album), 2013
- For You (Prince album), or the title song, 1978
- For You (Jo Stafford album), 2011
- For You (Tatsuro Yamashita album), 1982
- For You (Kirk Whalum album), 1998
- For You (EP), by Luv', 1989
- For You, by Jack Russell, 2002
- For You, by Jackie DeShannon, 1967
- For You, by Khaya Mthethwa, 2012
- Gold Vol. 1, alternately titled For You, by Celine Dion, 1995

== Songs ==
- "For You" (Bruce Springsteen song), 1973
- "For You" (The Calling song), 2003
- "For You" (Electronic song), 1996
- "For You" (Keith Urban song), 2012
- "For You" (Kenny Lattimore song), 1997
- "For You" (Liam Payne and Rita Ora song), 2018
- "For You" (Mariette song), 2018
- "For You" (The Outfield song), 1990
- "For You" (Ricky Nelson song), written by Joe Burke and Al Dubin, 1930; covered by Ricky Nelson, 1963
- "For You" (Staind song), 2001
- "For You" (Hikaru Utada song), 2000
- "For You: Kimi no Tame ni Dekiru Koto", by 2AM, 2012
- "Sheni gulistvis" (English: "For You"), by Iriao, 2018
- "For You", by +/- from Let's Build a Fire
- "For You", by All That Remains from The Order of Things
- "For You", by Angus & Julia Stone from Down the Way
- "For You", by Anti-Nowhere League from We Are...The League
- "For You", by Azu from Two of Us
- "For You", by Baboon from Sausage
- "For You", by Barenaked Ladies from Everything to Everyone
- "For You", by Big Star from Third
- "For You", by BTS from Youth
- "For You", by Coldplay from Parachutes
- "For You", by Converge from Unloved and Weeded Out
- "For You", by Demi Lovato from Confident
- "For You", by The Devil Wears Prada from Flowers
- "For You", by Emerson, Lake & Palmer from Love Beach
- "For You", by (G)I-dle from Latata
- "For You", by Greg Kihn from Greg Kihn Again
- "For You", by HIM from Greatest Lovesongs Vol. 666
- "For You", by James Otto from Sunset Man
- "For You", by John Denver from Higher Ground
- "For You", by Journey from Time3
- "For You", by Killswitch Engage from As Daylight Dies
- "For You", by Manfred Mann from Chance
- "For You", by Michael W. Smith from Go West Young Man
- "For You", by My Dying Bride from Like Gods of the Sun
- "For You", by R. Kelly from 12 Play
- "For You", by Rae Morris from Unguarded
- "For You", by Six by Seven from The Things We Make
- "For You", by Split Enz from The Beginning of the Enz
- "For You", by Status Quo from Rockin' All Over the World
- "For You", by Stray Kids from SKZ2021
- "For You", by Stream of Passion from A War of Our Own
- "For You", by T-ara from So Good
- "For You", by Tonight Alive from Underworld
- "For You", by Tracy Chapman from Tracy Chapman
- "For You", by Travis Tritt from No More Looking over My Shoulder
- "For You", by Trevor Daniel from Homesick
- "For You", by TV Girl from Who Really Cares
- "For You", by the Used from The Canyon
- "For You", by the Vamps from Night & Day
- "For You", by Why Don't We from The Good Times and the Bad Ones
- "For U", by Stephanie Mills from Born for This!
- "For: You", by Kali Uchis from Sincerely

== Other uses ==
- For You (film) or Men Ajlikom, a 2015 Lebanese biblical drama film
- For You (Italian TV channel), an Italian shopping and movie channel
- For You, a 2009 chamber opera by Michael Berkeley

== See also ==
- 4U (disambiguation)
- This One's for You (disambiguation)
- Tere Liye (disambiguation)
