= Mauro Piacenza =

Italian prelate (born 1944)

His Eminence Mauro Piacenza
- Major Penitentiary emeritus of the Apostolic Penitentiary
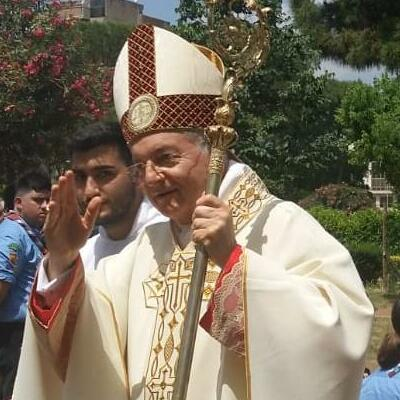
- Piacenza in 2022.
- Church: Roman Catholic Church
- Appointed: 21 September 2013
- Term ended: 6 April 2024
- Predecessor: Manuel Monteiro de Castro
- Successor: Angelo De Donatis
- Other post: Cardinal-Priest 'pro hac vice' of San Paolo alle Tre Fontane (2021-)
- Previous posts: Undersecretary of the Congregation for the Clergy (2000-03) President of the Pontifical Commission for the Cultural Heritage of the Church (2003–07); Titular Bishop of Victoriana (2003–07); President of the Pontifical Commission for Sacred Archeology (2004–07); Secretary of the Congregation for the Clergy (2007–10); Vice-President of the International Council for Catechesis (2007-10) Titular Archbishop of Victoriana (2007–10); President of the International Council for Catechesis (2010-13) Prefect of the Congregation for the Clergy (2010–13) Cardinal-Deacon of San Paolo alle Tre Fontane (2010-21) President of the Interdicasterial Commission for Candidates to the Sacred Order (2013)

Orders
- Ordination: 21 December 1969 by Giuseppe Siri
- Consecration: 15 November 2003 by Tarcisio Bertone
- Created cardinal: 20 November 2010 by Benedict XVI
- Rank: Cardinal-Deacon (2010-21); Cardinal-Priest (2021-)

Personal details
- Born: Mauro Piacenza; 15 September 1944 (age 82) Genoa, Kingdom of Italy
- Denomination: Catholic (Roman Rite)
- Education: Pontifical Lateran University
- Motto: Una quies in veritate
- Coat of arms

Styles of Mauro Piacenza
- Reference style: His Eminence
- Spoken style: Your Eminence
- Informal style: Cardinal
- See: none

Mauro Piacenza (born 15 September 1944) is an Italian prelate of the Catholic Church. A cardinal since 2010, he was Major Penitentiary of the Apostolic Penitentiary from 2013 to 2024. He was Prefect of the Congregation for the Clergy from 7 October 2010 to 21 September 2013. where he had been Secretary since 2007. At that Congregation, Pope Benedict XVI, according to one report, valued "his efficiency and in-depth knowledge of how the Congregation worked and its problems" and "his traditionalist ecclesiastical line of thought".

== Early life ==
Piacenza was born in Genoa on 15 September 1944. After studying at the Major Archiepiscopal Seminary of Genoa, he was ordained to the priesthood by Giuseppe Siri on 21 December 1969. He then completed his studies at the Pontifical Lateran University, where he obtained a doctorate summa cum laude in canon law.

After serving as a parochial vicar, he worked as chaplain to the University of Genoa. Piacenza taught canon law at the Theological Faculty of Northern Italy and held several other posts, serving as the archbishop's press officer. He was the diocesan assistant of the ecclesial Movement of Cultural Commitment. He served as professor of contemporary culture and history of atheism at the Ligurian Higher Institute of Religious Studies as well as professor of dogmatic theology at the Diocesan Institute of Theology for the Lay "Didascaleion". He also taught theology at several state schools. He was made a canon of the Genoa Cathedral in 1986.

== Service in the Roman Curia ==
He joined the staff of the Congregation for the Clergy in 1990 and was named its Undersecretary on 11 March 2000.

On 13 October 2003, Pope John Paul II appointed Piacenza President of the Pontifical Commission for the Cultural Heritage of the Church and titular bishop of Victoriana. He received his episcopal consecration on 15 November from Cardinal Tarcisio Bertone, with Cardinal Darío Castrillón Hoyos and Bishop Alberto Tanasini as co-consecrators.

He was named president of the Pontifical Commission for Sacred Archeology on 28 August 2004. He was appointed secretary of the Congregation for the Clergy and raised to the rank of archbishop on 7 May 2007. That appointment has been interpreted as Pope Benedict's way of positioning a thoroughly orthodox secretary to monitor the work of his superior, the far more liberal Cardinal Claudio Hummes. He was appointed Prefect of that Congregation on 7 October 2010.

On 20 November 2010 Pope Benedict XVI made him Cardinal-Deacon of San Paolo alle Tre Fontane and, on 29 December 2010, appointed him a member of the Congregation for Divine Worship and the Discipline of the Sacraments, the Congregation for Catholic Education, and the Pontifical Council for Social Communications.

He was one of the cardinal electors who participated in the 2013 papal conclave that elected Pope Francis.

Piacenza, like all officers of the Roman Curia, lost his position with the resignation of Pope Benedict XVI. Pope Francis reappointed them temporarily and then moved Piacenza from his position as Prefect of the Congregation for the Clergy to head the Apostolic Penitentiary on 21 September 2013. His new role was described as "a decidedly lower command post" as head of "a little-known Vatican tribunal that deals with confessions of sins so grave only a pope can grant faculties to absolve from them, such as the case of a priest who violates confessional secrecy". He had arrived years earlier at the Congregation for the Clergy as a check upon the Congregation's prefect Cardinal Hummes, one of Pope Francis' closest allies.

After ten years at the rank of cardinal deacon, he exercised his option to assume the rank of cardinal priest, which Pope Francis confirmed on 3 May 2021.

He was succeeded as major penitentiary by Angelo De Donatis on 6 April 2024.

Catholic Church titles
Preceded by Antonio Silvestrelli	Undersecretary of the Congregation for the Clergy; 11 March 2000 – 13 October 2003	Succeeded by Giovanni Carrù
Preceded by Cesare Nosiglia	— TITULAR — Titular Bishop of Victoriana; 13 October 2003 – 7 May 2007	Himself as Titular Archbishop
Preceded by José Tomás Sánchez	President of the Pontifical Commission for the Cultural Heritage of the Church; 13 October 2003 – 7 May 2007	Succeeded by Gianfranco Ravasi
Preceded by Francesco Marchisano	President of the Pontifical Commission for Sacred Archaeology; 28 August 2004 – 3 September 2007	Succeeded by Gianfranco Ravasi
Himself as Titular Bishop	Titular Archbishop of Victoriana; 7 May 2007 – 20 November 2010	Succeeded by Giuseppe Sciacca
Preceded by Csaba Ternyák	Secretary of the Congregation for the Clergy; 7 May 2007 – 7 October 2010	Succeeded by Celso Morga Iruzubieta
Preceded by Cláudio Hummes	Prefect of the Congregation for the Clergy; 7 October 2010 – 21 September 2013	Succeeded by Beniamino Stella
Titular church established	Cardinal-Deacon of San Paolo alle Tre Fontane; 20 November 2010 –	Incumbent
Preceded by Manuel Monteiro de Castro	Major Penitentiary; 21 September 2013 – 6 April 2024	Succeeded by Angelo De Donatis
