= Gianfranco Ravasi =

Italian prelate of the Catholic Church (born 1942)

His Eminence Gianfranco Ravasi
- President of the Pontifical Council for Culture
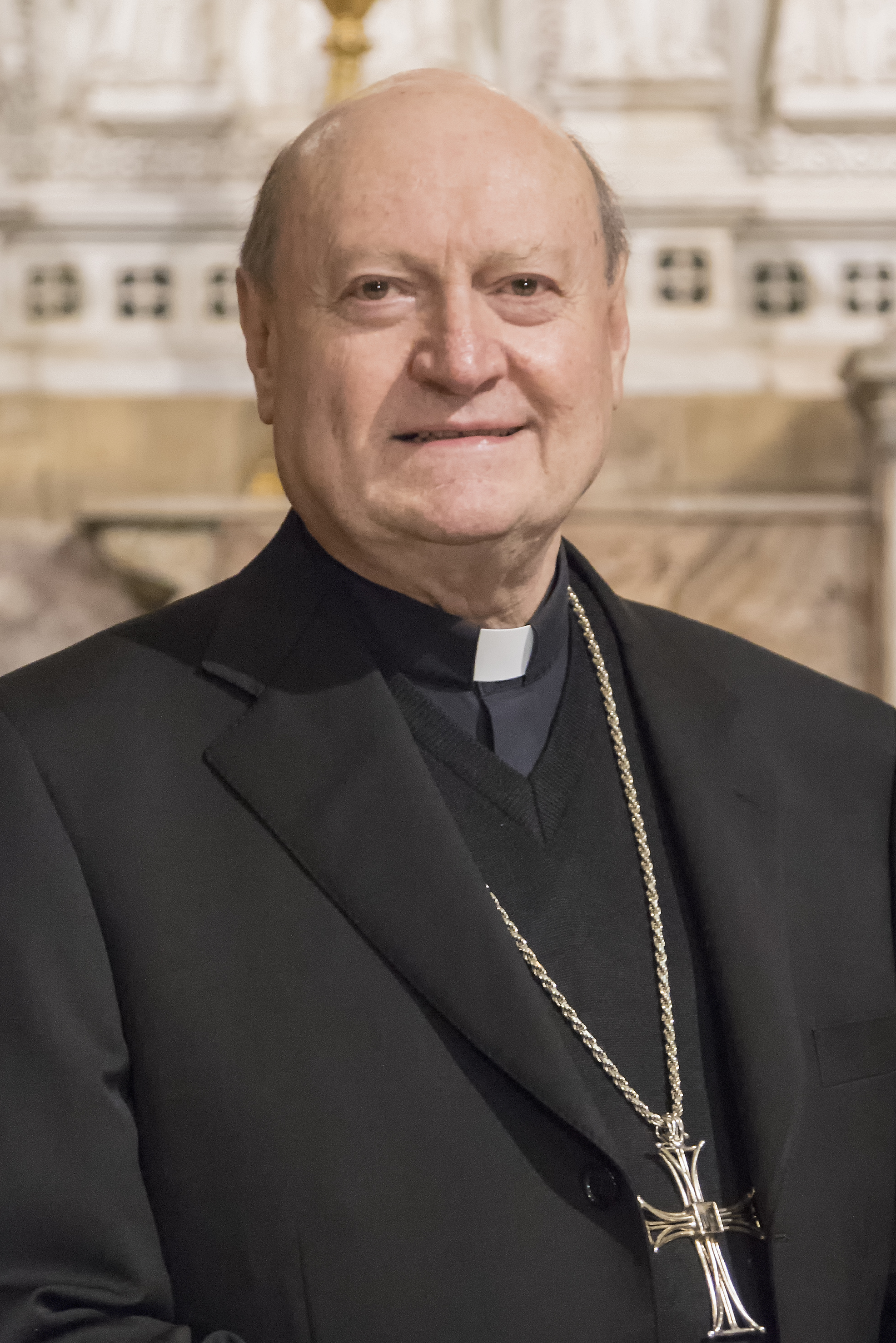
- Cardinal Ravasi in 2018
- Appointed: 3 September 2007
- Term ended: 5 June 2022
- Predecessor: Paul Poupard
- Successor: Office abolished
- Other posts: Cardinal priest of San Giorgio in Velabro (since 2021); President of the Pontifical Commission for Sacred Archeology (since 2007)
- Previous posts: President of the Pontifical Commission for the Cultural Heritage of the Church (2007–2012); Prefect of the Ambrosian Library (1989–2007); Titular Archbishop of Villamagna in Proconsulari (2007–2010)

Orders
- Ordination: 28 June 1966 by Giovanni Umberto Colombo
- Consecration: 29 September 2007 by Pope Benedict XVI
- Created cardinal: 20 November 2010 by Benedict XVI
- Rank: Cardinal deacon (2010–2021); Cardinal priest (since 2021)

Personal details
- Born: Gianfranco Ravasi; 18 October 1942 (age 83) Merate, Italy
- Denomination: Roman Catholic
- Education: Archiepiscopal seminary of Milan; Pontifical Gregorian University; Pontifical Biblical Institute
- Motto: Praedica Verbum ("Preach the Word") — 2 Timothy 4:2

- Coat of arms

Styles of Gianfranco Ravasi
- Reference style: His Eminence
- Spoken style: Your Eminence
- Religious style: Cardinal
- Informal style: Cardinal

Gianfranco Ravasi (born 18 October 1942) is an Italian prelate of the Catholic Church and a biblical scholar. A cardinal since 2010, he was President of the Pontifical Council for Culture from 2007 to 2022. He headed Milan's Ambrosian Library from 1989 to 2007.

== Biography ==
=== Early life ===
The oldest of three children, Ravasi was born in Merate, province of Lecco, Kingdom of Italy. His father was an anti-fascist treasury agent who served in Sicily during World War II, but later deserted the army; it took him 18 months to return to his family. Ravasi later said: "My search has always been for something permanent, for what is behind the transitory, the contingent. I'm fighting loss and death, which probably relates to the absence of my father in my first years." His mother was a schoolteacher.

=== Early career ===
Ravasi planned on a career teaching Greek and Latin classics before decided to join the priesthood. He attended the seminary of Milan and was ordained by Cardinal Giovanni Colombo on 28 June 1966. He studied in Rome at the Pontifical Gregorian University and the Pontifical Biblical Institute. He spent summers in Syria, Jordan, Iraq, and Turkey, working as an archaeologist with such figures as Kathleen Kenyon and Roland de Vaux.

He later served as a professor of exegesis of the Old Testament at the Theological Faculty of Northern Italy in Milan. From 1989 to 2007, he was prefect of the Ambrosian Library, where he became a well-known figure in literary and academic circles while also giving popular lectures on religious subjects.

=== Roman Curia ===
On 3 September 2007, Ravasi was appointed President of the Pontifical Council for Culture and named an archbishop of the titular see of Villamagna in Proconsulari. He was also named President of the Pontifical Commission for the Cultural Heritage of the Church (Note: This commission was merged into the Pontifical Council for Culture in 2012.) and of the Pontifical Commission for Sacred Archeology. Pope Benedict XVI consecrated him a bishop on 29 September, with Cardinals Tarcisio Bertone and Marian Jaworski as co-consecrators.

On 20 November 2010, he was created Cardinal-Deacon of San Giorgio in Velabro.

On 11 December 2010, Ravasi was named a member of the Congregation for Catholic Education for a five-year renewable term. On 29 December 2010, he was appointed a member of the new Pontifical Council for the Promotion of the New Evangelisation and also a member of the Pontifical Council for Interreligious Dialogue.

In February 2013, during the final days of the pontificate of Benedict XVI, he preached the Lenten retreat Spiritual Exercises to the papal household and the Roman Curia.

He was one of the cardinal electors who participated in the 2013 papal conclave that elected Pope Francis.

He organized the Vatican participation in the Venice Biennale in May 2013. Instead of restricting itself to religious art, it asked artists to produce works on the theme "Creation, De-Creation and Re-Creation" in order to "create an atmosphere of dialogue between art and faith". Artists included Studio Azzurro, a Milan-based art collective that produces interactive videos, Czech photographer Josef Koudelka, and abstract painter Lawrence Carroll.

As president of the Pontifical Commission for Sacred Archaeology, in November 2013 he announced the opening of visits, including virtual visits, to the newly excavated Catacomb of Priscilla in Rome.

He was appointed a member of the Congregation for Divine Worship and the Discipline of the Sacraments in October 2016.

In March 2017, he announced the creation of a Feminine Consultation within he Pontifical Council for Culture, with 37 women chosen from a mix of nationalities, religions, professions, political views, and marital status. He said: "the function of these women is a real function, they are called to express judgments; they have already criticized me on some proposals and have put forward others! For instance, in connection with the forthcoming Plenary Assembly of the dicastery, on neuroscience, artificial intelligence, genetics, robotics, information technology, etc. on all these issues these women have expressed–as scientists and as women–judgments that we would be unable to formulate."

After ten years at the rank of cardinal deacon, he exercised his option to assume the rank of cardinal priest, which Pope Francis confirmed on 3 May 2021.

== Views and theology ==
=== Dialogue with non-believers ===
Ravasi has developed Pope Benedict XVI's vision of an international forum that fosters dialogue between Christian believers and agnostics or atheists. He "wanted to reintroduce the ancient tradition of the 'disputed questions' – as they were called then – while at that time they had to do with different opinions and theses, in this case they will be between believers and nonbelievers." He added "I am trying to see to it that this danger is avoided". He stated that "I want really fundamental questions to be asked – questions of anthropology, then good and evil, life and afterlife, love, suffering, the meaning of evil – questions that are substantially at the basis of human existence."

=== Preaching ===
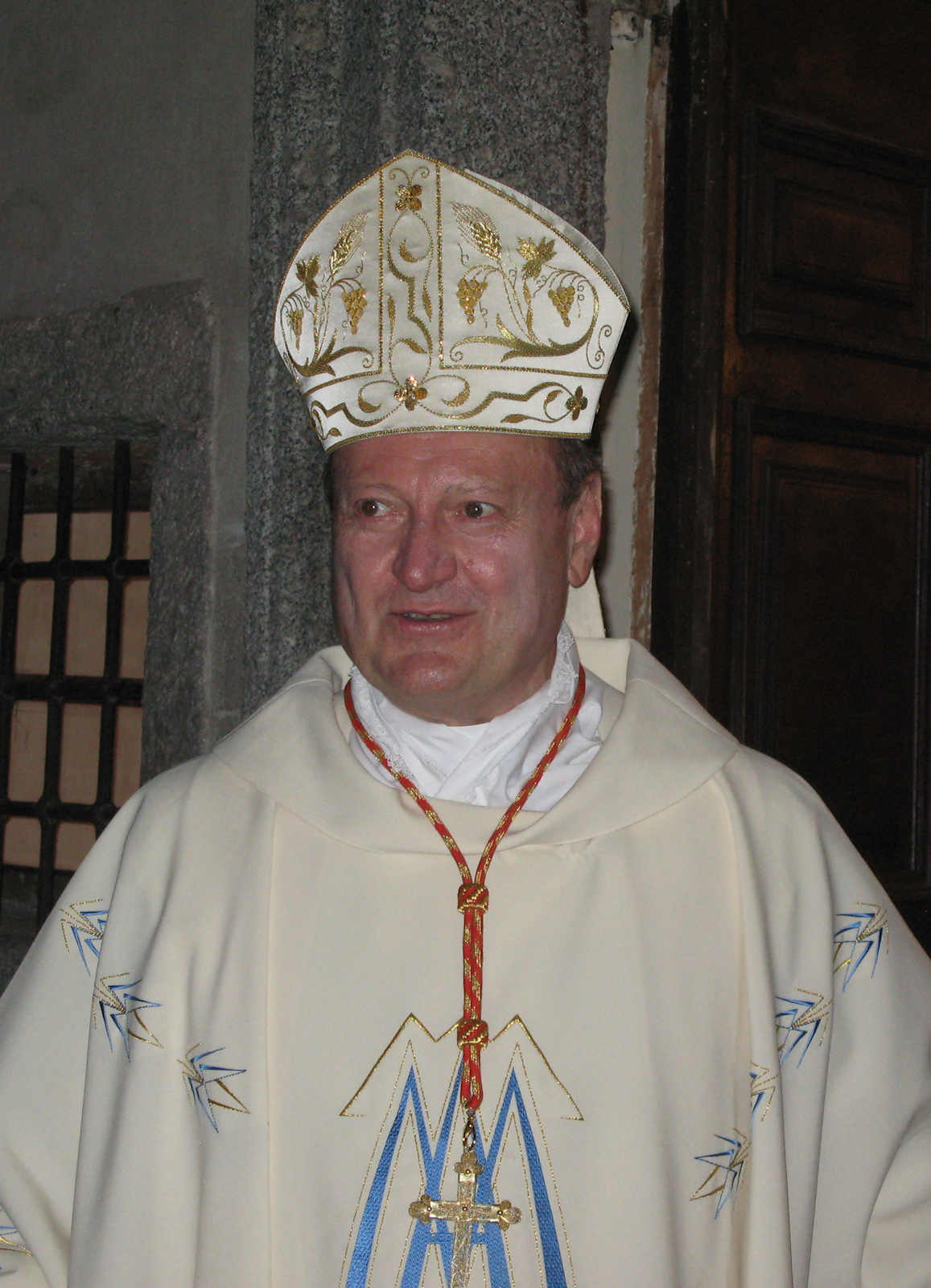
Cardinal Ravasi in 2012.

In November 2011, Cardinal Ravasi said preaching in churches had become formulaic and boring, such that it risked becoming "irrelevant". He said that "The advent of televised and computerised information requires us to be compelling and trenchant, to cut to the heart of the matter, resort to narratives and colour". He added that "We need to remember that communicating faith doesn't just take place through sermons. It can be achieved through the 140 characters of a Twitter message."

=== Contemporary culture ===
Ravasi sprinkles his speeches and communications with references to secular culture. Via his Twitter account he has shared, as well as prayers and Bible passages, observations on life and faith from Shakespeare, Jonathan Swift, Buddha, Camus, Mark Twain and others. He announced his departure for the U.S. saying: "Departing for the land of Dickinson, Poe, Whitman, Melville, Twain, Hemingway, Kerouac, F. O’Connor, Salinger, Roth, Bellow, Updike." In 2013 and 2016 he commemorated the deaths of musical artists Lou Reed and David Bowie, quoting "Perfect Day" and "Space Oddity", respectively.

=== Evolution ===
In 2008, he said, "I want to affirm, as an a priori, the compatibility of the theory of evolution with the message of the Bible and the Church's theology." He also noted that neither Charles Darwin nor his work On the Origin of Species had ever been condemned by the Church.

=== Archeology ===
Ravasi believes that archeology is a crucial undertaking in understanding the world. He said in a 2015 interview that "archeology is very important in my view because it permits us to understand that man did not start from zero, but is always building upon his patrimony, his heritage".

=== Religious liberty ===
In 2013, Ravasi delivered an address to the TED conference held in Rome in which he said that religious liberty was a fundamental dimension of the human person that had to be respected. However, the cardinal highlighted that "in modern democratic countries there are also very subtle methods for impinging on religious liberty". Ravasi said that religious liberty was an absolute necessity, particularly in a globalized world "where cultures are intermingled and adherents of different religions are constrained to live side by side". Bearing that point in mind, according to Ravasi, religious tolerance was an imperative that modern society imposed for "congenial living and progress".

Ravasi has criticized those governments around the world that seek to impede or restrict religious freedoms and has suggested that there are some religious minorities that do not receive sufficient protection from their governments. He has also criticized laws that infringe on religious beliefs and has said that laws forcing abortion and euthanasia practices are the most prevalent examples.

On 24 February 2016, the Italian daily newspaper Il Sole 24 Ore published the official open letter addressed by Mgr. Ravasian to the global Freemasonry which started with the expression Dear Masonic Brothers, never used before by an official Vatican document. After an historical excursus of the Magisterium's declarations on the incompatibility between the Masonic membership and the Christian faith, the text affirmed it was "evident that Masonry assumed Christian models, even liturgical ones", and finally opened to a new prolific dialogue through the parties, based on the comunance of moral values like the philanthropy, the human dignity and the opposition to materialism.

=== Female diaconate ===
Cardinal Ravasi has suggested that the diaconate for women was a possibility. In a 2017 interview with a German news site, Ravasi said that "women deacons would be a possibility in my eyes, but it would naturally have to be discussed first as the historical tradition is very complex". He has also said that the current debate regarding the issue made the matter very 'clerical' and tied too closely to the matter of female ordination. However, Ravasi also said that it was prudent to show caution when discussing the matter since ambiguity in the media becomes a greater problem that hijacks the debate and steers it in the wrong direction.

=== Liturgy ===
In a retreat preached to the Roman Curia, Ravasi said that "our liturgy is continuously looking upward, toward the transcendence of God and Christ, to His Word".

Ravasi is also a strong proponent of the liturgy that emerged following the Second Vatican Council as opposed to the pre-Conciliar Tridentine Mass. However, he is attentive to the musical tradition of the Church in a way that can be an expression of true worship.

== Distinctions ==
- Ravasi was admitted to the Sacred Military Constantinian Order of Saint George by Infante Carlos, Duke of Calabria in 2006 and promoted to Bailiff Grand Cross of Justice following his elevation to the College of Cardinals, in 2010.
- 2023 – International Prize "Leonardo – The Immortal Light", Cultural Research section, awarded by the International Committee Leonardo da Vinci.

== Notes ==
Catholic Church titles
Preceded by Carlos Enrique García Camader	— TITULAR — Titular Archbishop of Villamagna in Proconsulari; 3 September 2007 – 20 November 2010	Succeeded by Fernando Vérgez Alzaga
Preceded by Paul Poupard	President of the Pontifical Council for Culture; 3 September 2007 – 5 June 2022	Succeeded by Commission suppressed
Preceded by Mauro Piacenza	President of the Pontifical Commission for the Cultural Heritage of the Church; 3 September 2007 – 30 July 2012	Succeeded by Commission suppressed
Preceded by Mauro Piacenza	President of the Pontifical Commission for Sacred Archeology; 3 September 2007 –	Incumbent
Preceded by Alfons Maria Stickler	Cardinal-Deacon of San Giorgio in Velabro; 20 November 2010 –	Incumbent
