= Pontifical Commission for the Cultural Heritage of the Church =

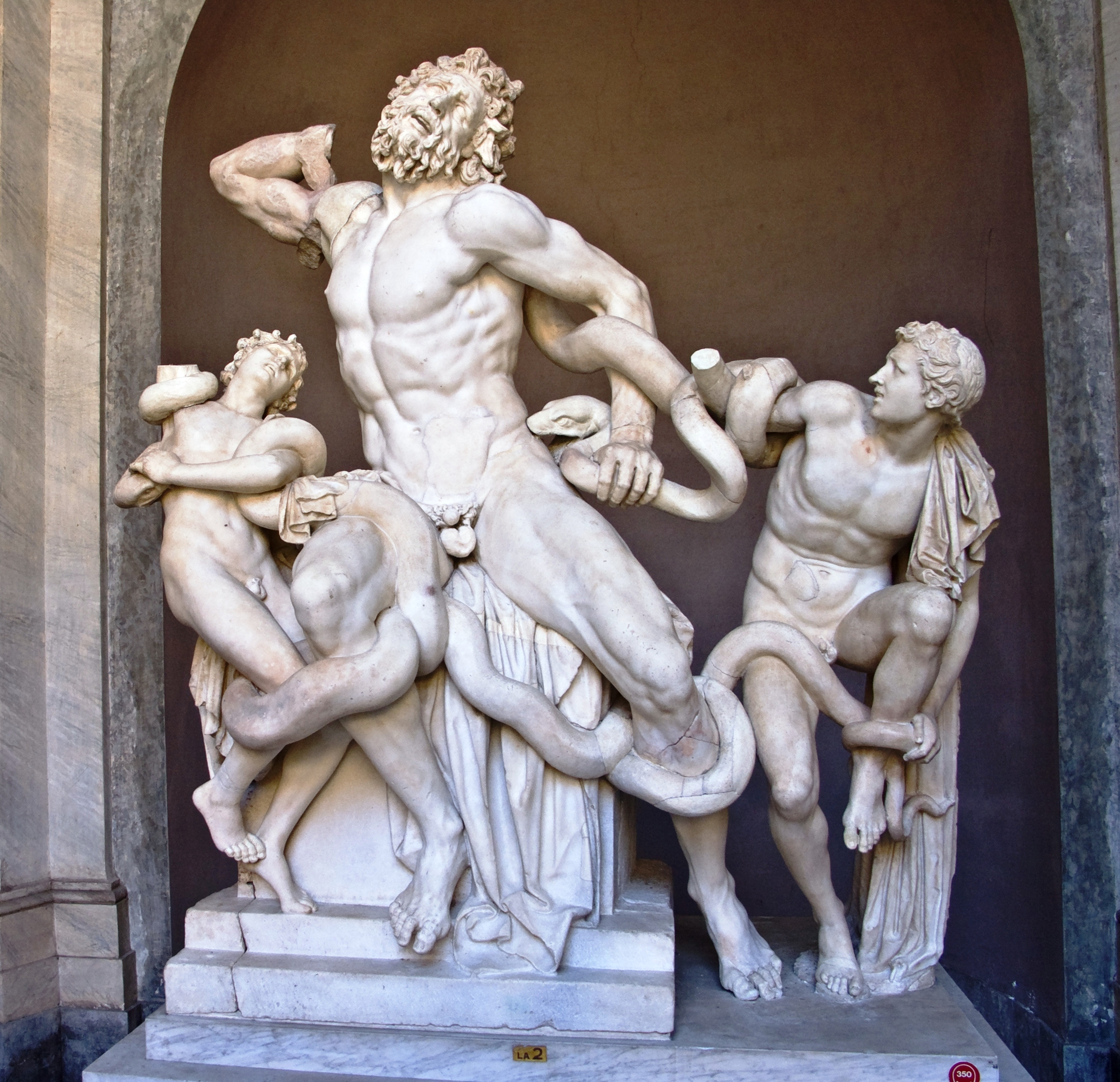
Laocoön and His Sons in the Vatican Museums which conserve part of the cultural heritage of the Church

The Pontifical Commission for the Cultural Heritage of the Church (Latin: Pontificia Commissio de Patrimonio Artis et Historiae conservando) was an institution within the Roman Curia of the Catholic Church that presided over the guardianship of the historical and artistic patrimony of the entire Church - that is to say, works of art, historical documents, books, and everything kept in ecclesiastical museums as well as in ecclesiastical libraries and archives.

It also collaborated with the particular Churches and with national episcopal conferences in the conservation of this patrimony, and was charged with promoting an ever greater awareness in the Church about these riches.

== Description ==
Pursuant to the reorganisation of the Roman Curia carried out by Pope John Paul II by his Apostolic Constitution Pastor Bonus of 1988, there was erected within the Congregation for the Clergy a Pontifical Commission for Preserving the Patrimony of Art and History. It was the direct heir of the Pontifical commission for religious art, erected in 1924, initially only for Italy, with an important role for the preservation of art during World War II. From 1948 to 1951, the Commission examined over 700 projects for the reconstruction of churches and other structures destroyed during World War II.

By the Apostolic Letter given Motu Proprio Inde a pontificatus (25 March 1993), Pope John Paul II renamed it the Pontifical Commission for the Cultural Heritage of the Church and established it as an autonomous body independent of the Congregation for the Clergy, with its own President who was to be a member of the Pontifical Council for Culture so as to ensure a proper coordination of the activities of the two bodies.

By his Apostolic Letter given Motu Proprio Pulchritudinis fidei (30 July 2012), Pope Benedict XVI recognised the convergence of the role and functions of these two bodies and suppressed the commission, transferring its former objectives, faculties and activities to the Pontifical Council for Culture.

== Presidents of the Pontifical Commission ==
- Antonio Innocenti (8 Oct 1988 - 1 Jul 1991)
- Francesco Marchisano (4 May 1993 - 13 Oct 2003)
- Mauro Piacenza (13 Oct 2003 - 7 May 2007)
- Gianfranco Ravasi (3 Sep 2007 - 30 June 2012)

== See also ==
- Pontifical Commission
