= Pontifical Council for Dialogue with Non-Believers =

Former dicastery of the Roman Curia

- Pontificium consilium pro dialogo cum non credentibus
- Abbreviation: PCDNC
- Predecessor: Secretariat for Non-Believers
- Merged into: Pontifical Council for Culture
- Established: 6 April 1965; 61 years ago
- Founder: Pope Paul VI
- Founded at: Vatican City
- Dissolved: 4 March 1993; 33 years ago
- Purpose: to promote dialogue with non-believers
- Main organ: Secretariat
- Parent organization: Roman Curia
- Formerly called: Secretariat for Non-Believers

The Pontifical Council for Dialogue with Non-Believers (Latin: Pontificium consilium pro dialogo cum non credentibus, PCDNC) was a dicastery of the Roman Curia charged with promoting dialogue between the Catholic Church and non-believers. Its original designation as "Secretariat" was changed to "Pontifical Council" on 30 June 1988. The PCDNC was merged into the Pontifical Council for Culture in 1993.

== History ==
Cardinal Franz König was appointed by the Pope as the first president of the Secretariat with Cardinal Avery Dulles as the consultor of the Secretariat. An American branch was set up and headed by the Bishop of Pittsburgh John Wright. However, Dulles never attended any Secretariat meetings in Rome due to feeling he would not contribute much. Bishop Wright also did not arrange any meetings with non-believers leading to the American branch being unsuccessful.

During the 1980s, the Secretariat published a number of research papers on atheism, science and the concept of secular ethics. They would often send questionnaires to bishops, Catholic communities and non-believers whom were interested in dialogue with the church. Originally, it was the sole outlet for the Church to have formal dialogue with non-believers, however in 1982 the Pontifical Council for Culture was founded and took on some of the official dialogue roles from the Secretariat but the Secretariat retained its independence.

When the Pontifical Council for Dialogue with Non-Believers was merged with the Council of Culture in 1993, it was noted that the cessation of the use of the term "unbelievers" was a positive one as it was believed by Catholics that the previous title had discouraged non-believers from engaging with the Council and the Church. It was speculated that the decision to merge was a triumphalist gesture motivated by the collapse of the Soviet Union and the state atheism they espoused, meaning it was largely redundant.
