= Back to Bacharach =

Studio album by Steve Tyrell
- Released: June 24, 2008
- Studio: Deep Diner Studios New York City, Blackbird Studios and Kyle Lehning's House Nashville, The Barn Washington, Mass, Schnee Studios and Steve's House Los Angeles
- Genre: Jazz, soft rock
- Length: 57:30
- Label: Koch
- Producer: Bob Mann, Steve Tyrell, Jon Allen

Steve Tyrell chronology
Disney Standards (2006)	Back to Bacharach (2008)	I'll Take Romance (2012)

Professional ratings
Review scores
Source	Rating
AllMusic	3.5/5 stars

Back to Bacharach is a jazz/soft rock album by Steve Tyrell that was released in 2008 by Koch Records.

== Track listing ==
All music is composed by Burt Bacharach and Hal David.

No.	Title	Length
1.	"Walk on By"	3:28
2.	"The Look of Love"	4:57
3.	"This Guy's in Love with You" (with Herb Alpert and Burt Bacharach)	3:42
4.	"One Less Bell to Answer"	3:17
5.	"What the World Needs Now" (with Burt Bacharach, Martina McBride, Rod Stewart, James Taylor, and Dionne Warwick)	4:50
6.	"Reach Out for Me"	3:45
7.	"I Say a Little Prayer for You" (duet with Patti Austin)	3:24
8.	"I Just Don't Know What to Do With Myself" (featuring Burt Bacharach)	3:16
9.	"Always Something There to Remind Me"	3:43
10.	"Don't Make Me Over" (duet with Patti Austin)	3:19
11.	"Close to You"	3:42
12.	"A House Is Not a Home"	3:53
13.	"Alfie"	4:43
14.	"Raindrops Keep Fallin' on My Head"	3:50

== Personnel ==
=== Musicians ===
- Darryl Tookes, Lauren Tyrell, Fred White, LaTanya Hall, Lynne Fiddmont – vocals, background vocals
- Springhurst Elementary School Harmonaires – vocals
- Bob Mann – guitar, piano, Fender Rhodes piano, synthesizer
- Abe Appleman, Barry Finclair, Karl Kawahara, Anne Leathers, Shinwon Kim, Richard Sortomme, Carol Webb, Jonathan Dinklage – violin
- Karen Ritscher, Vince Lionti – viola
- Semyon Fridman, Roger Shell – cello
- Warren Luening – trumpet, flugelhorn
- Herb Alpert – trumpet
- Lew Soloff, Matt Fronke – flugelhorn
- Dave Bargeron – baritone horn
- Burt Bacharach – piano, keyboards
- Kenny Ascher, Quinn Johnson – piano
- Guy Moon – organ
- Jon Allen – keyboards
- Allan Schwartzberg – drums, percussion
- John Guerin – drums
- Dorian Holley, Patti Austin – background vocals

=== Support ===
- Steve Tyrell – liner note author
- Tina Tyrell – photographer
- Steve Tyrell, Bob Mann, Burt Bacharach – arrangement
- Lawrence Azerrad – art direction, design
- Bill Schnee – mixing
- Darius Fong – mixing assistant, Pro Tools engineer

== See also ==
- Album on Discogs
