= 4U =

4U or 4 U may refer to:

== Music ==
- 4U (album), by Elva Hsiao, 2002
- 4U (Christina Milian EP), 2015
- 4 U (Cody Simpson EP), 2010
- 4U: Outside, an EP by BtoB, 2021
- "4U", a song by Aero Chord, 2015
- "4U", a song by Blackbear from Deadroses, 2015
- "4 U", a song by Korn from Issues, 1999
- "4U", a song by Pi'erre Bourne from The Life of Pi'erre 5, 2021

== Other uses ==
- Germanwings (former IATA code: 4U), a former German low-cost airline subsidiary of Lufthansa
- 4U, a rack unit size
- 4U, the final (4th) catalog of Uhuru x-ray sources
- 4U:Abo Jana a popular energy drink in Iraq made by abo Jana

== See also ==
- U4 (disambiguation)
- For You (disambiguation)
