= Tre Fontane Abbey =

Roman Catholic abbey in Rome

Coordinates: 41°50′04″N 12°29′00″E

Tre Fontane Abbey (English: Three Fountains Abbey; Latin: Abbatia trium fontium ad Aquas Salvias), or the Abbey of Saints Vincent and Anastasius, is a Roman Catholic abbey in Rome, held by monks of the Cistercian Order of the Strict Observance, better known as Trappists. It is known for raising the lambs whose wool is used to weave the pallia of new metropolitan archbishops. The pope blesses the lambs on the feast of Saint Agnes on January 21. The wool is prepared, and he gives the pallia to the new archbishops on the Solemnity of Saints Peter and Paul, the Holy Apostles.

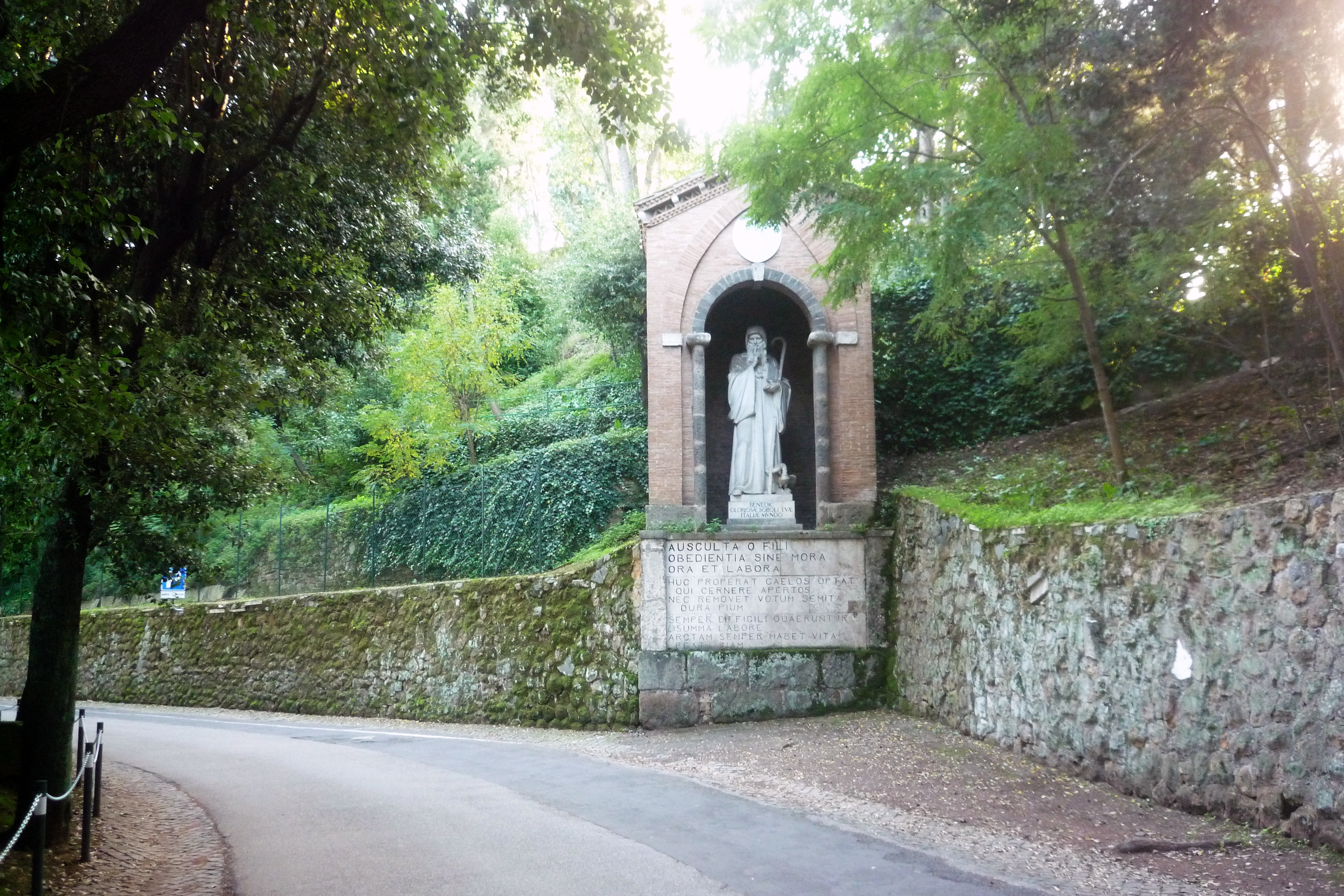
Acque Salvie avenue towards the Tre Fontane Abbey

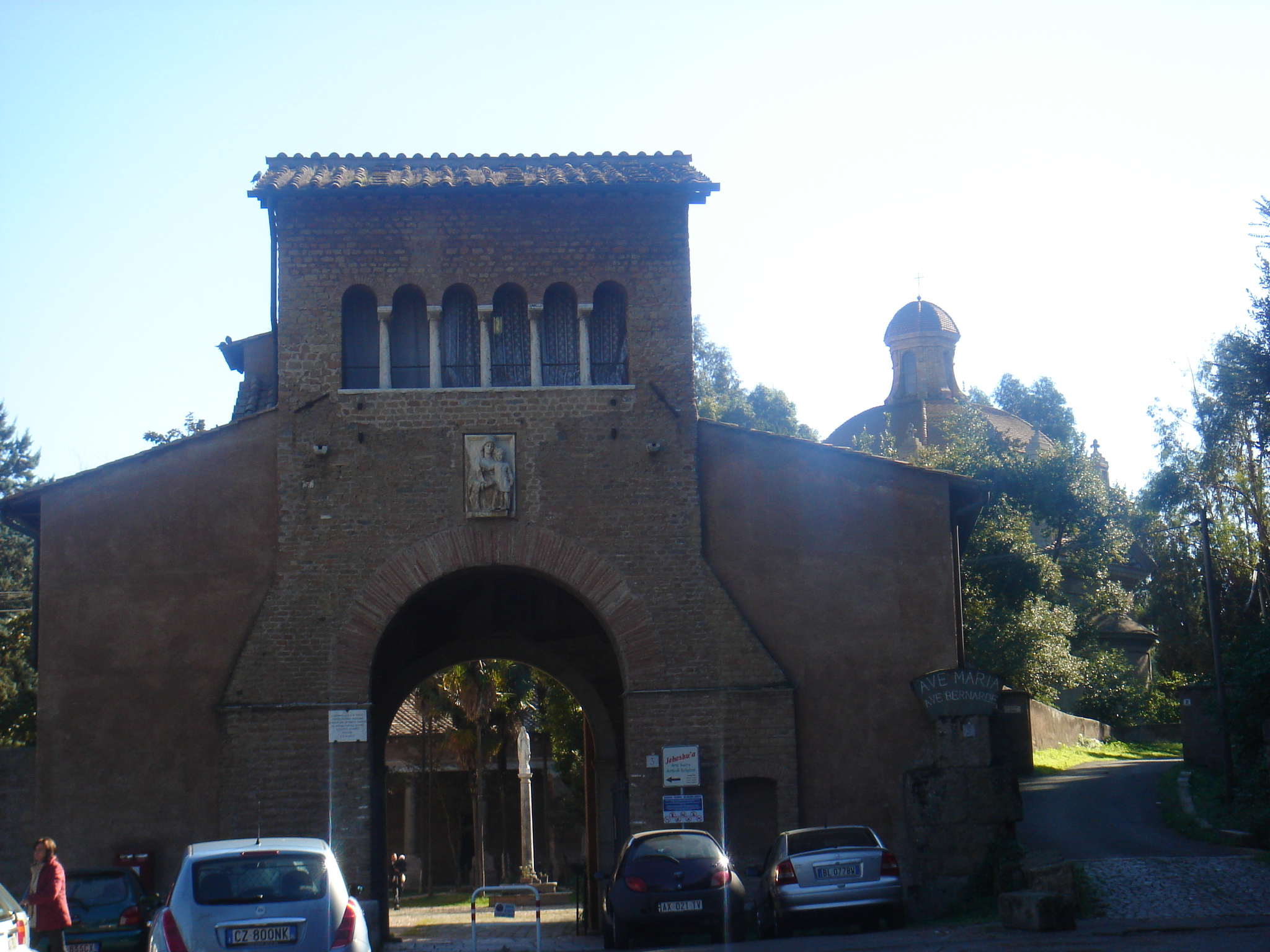
The Arch of Charlemagne at the abbey entrance

== History of the abbey ==
Belonging to the monastery are three separate churches. The first, the Church of St. Paul of Three Fountains, was raised on the spot where Paul of Tarsus was beheaded by order of Nero. Legend accounts for the three springs (fontane) with the assertion that, when severed from Paul's body, his head bounced and struck the earth in three different places, from which fountains sprang up. These still flow and are located in the sanctuary.

The second church, Santa Maria Scala Coeli, dedicated to Mary under the title "Our Lady of Martyrs", is built over the relics of Zeno the Tribune and his 10,203 legionaries, who were martyred at the order of Diocletian in 299. In this church is the altar of the scala coeli ("ladder to heaven"), from which the church receives its present name. The half-dome of the tribune has mosaics, executed after cartoons by Giovanni de' Vecchi, and presented to the church by Pope Clement VII and by Cardinal Aldobrandini.

Third are the church and monastery dedicated to Vincent of Saragossa and Anastasius of Persia, built by Pope Honorius I in 626 and given to the Benedictines. They were to care for the two older sanctuaries, as well as their own church.

Toward the middle of the seventh century, the persecutions inflicted on the Eastern monks by the Monothelites obliged many of them to seek shelter in Rome. The pope committed this abbey to them as a refuge. The abbey was richly endowed, particularly by Charlemagne, who bestowed on it the Isola del Giglio off the Tuscan coast, as well as Orbetello and eleven other towns with a considerable territory. Its abbot exercised ordinary jurisdiction (abbatia nullius) over this area.

In the tenth century, it was given to the Cluniacs. In 1140 Pope Innocent II withdrew the abbey from them, and entrusted it to Bernard of Clairvaux. He assigned a Cistercian colony from Clairvaux to the abbey, with Peter Bernard of Paganelli as their abbot, who five years later became Pope Eugene III.

When Innocent granted the monastery to the Cistercians, he had the church repaired and the monastic quarters rebuilt according to the usages of the order. Of the fourteen regular abbots who governed the abbey, several besides Eugene III became cardinals, legates, or bishops. Pope Honorius III restored the Church of Saints Vincent and Anastasius and personally consecrated it in 1221. At the same service, seven cardinals consecrated the seven altars within.

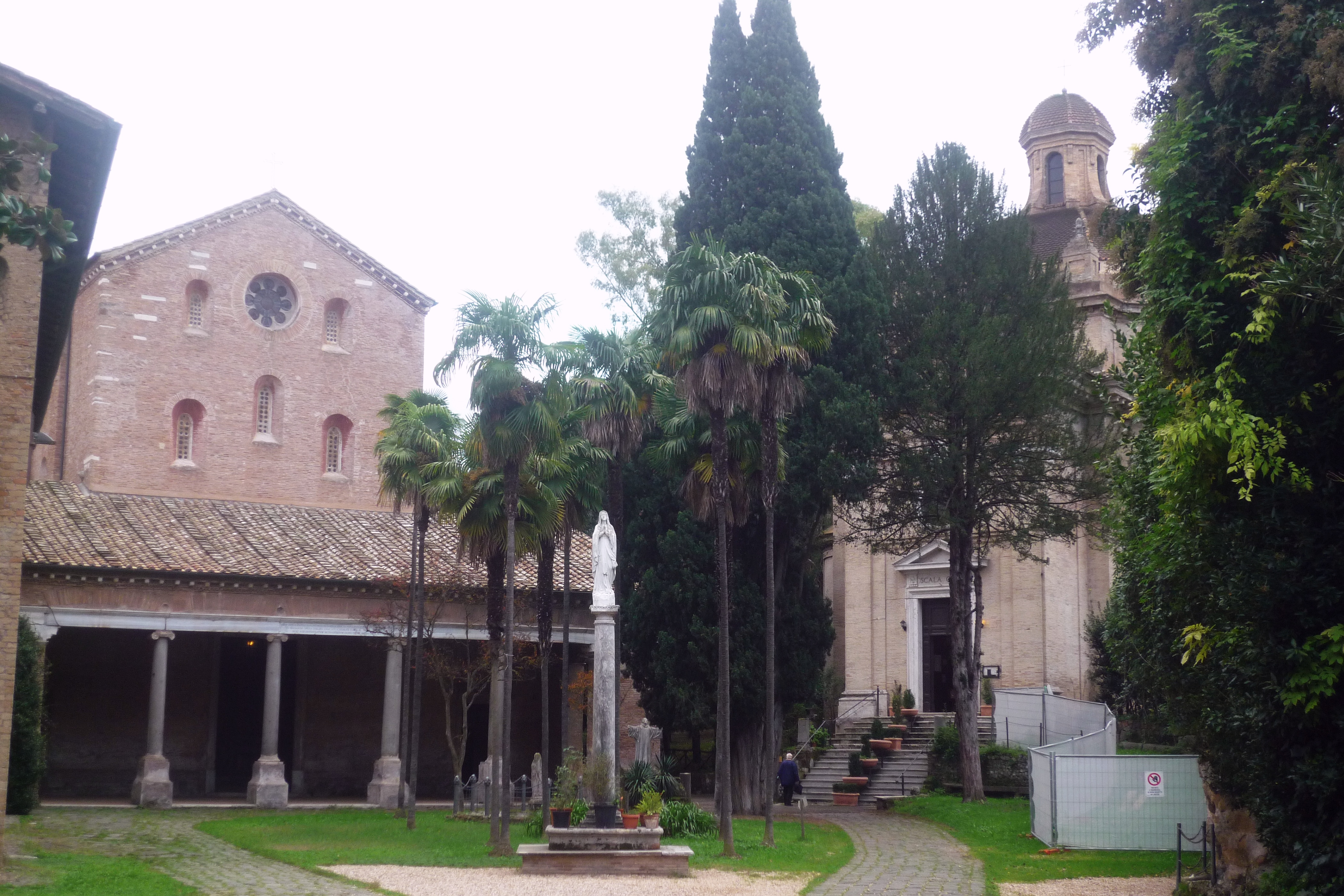
The square in the front of two churches: Santa Maria Scala Coeli (right) and Santi Anastasio e Vincenzo (left)

Cardinal Branda da Castiglione became the first commendatory abbot in 1419. Subsequently, this office was often filled by a cardinal. The cardinals and future popes Clement VII and Clement VIII held this position. In 1519 Pope Leo X authorized the religious to elect their own regular superior, a claustral prior independent of the commendatory abbot, who from this time forward was always to be a cardinal.

From 1625, when the abbey was affiliated to the Cistercian Congregation of St. Bernard in Tuscany, until its suppression at the Napoleonic invasion in 1812, the local superior was a regular abbot, but without prejudice to the commendatory abbot. The best known of this series of regular abbots was the second, Ferdinand Ughelli, who was one of the foremost literary men of his age, the author of Italia Sacra and numerous other works.

From 1812 the sanctuaries were deserted, until Leo XII removed them from the nominal care of the Cistercians in 1826, and transferred them to the Friars Minor of the Strict Observance. The purpose of the pontiff was not accomplished: the surroundings were so malarial that no community could live there. In 1867 Pius IX appointed as commendatory abbot of Tre Fontane his cousin Cardinal Giuseppe Milesi Pironi Ferretti, who worked to improve the physical surroundings. To ensure the sanctuaries were cared for, he committed the monastery to the Cistercians. A community was sent there in 1868 from La Grande Trappe to institute the regular life and to try to improve the healthiness of the lands. From long neglect they had been called the tomba (graveyard) of the Roman Campagna.

When the Papal States were incorporated at the unification of Italy in 1870, the friars remained at Tre Fontane. They first rented and then purchased the secularized properties from the government in 1886, including an additional tract of 1,234 acres (4.99 km^{2}). They inaugurated modern drainage methods to eliminate conditions that allowed the prevalence of chronic malaria, which had adversely affected local health. They also planted numerous eucalyptus and other trees, an experiment insisted upon by the government in the contract of sale. The trial proved a success, so that the vicinity became nearly as healthful as Rome.

In May 2015, Tre Fontane became the eleventh Trappist monastery to produce and sell Trappist beer.

== Our Lady of Revelation ==
Across the road from the abbey is the Grotto of the Three Fountains in Rome. It is said that this is where St. Paul was beheaded and his head bounced three times on the ground.

In 1947, it became a shrine to the Virgin Mary who appeared to Bruno Cornacchiola (back then, an Italian Neoprotestant Anarchist, who planned on assassinating the Roman Pontiff) and his three children. Bruno changed his ways and rejoined the Catholic Church, spending the rest of his life as a Catholic. From that moment forward, the dirt in the grotto is said to have miraculous powers.

== Photo gallery ==
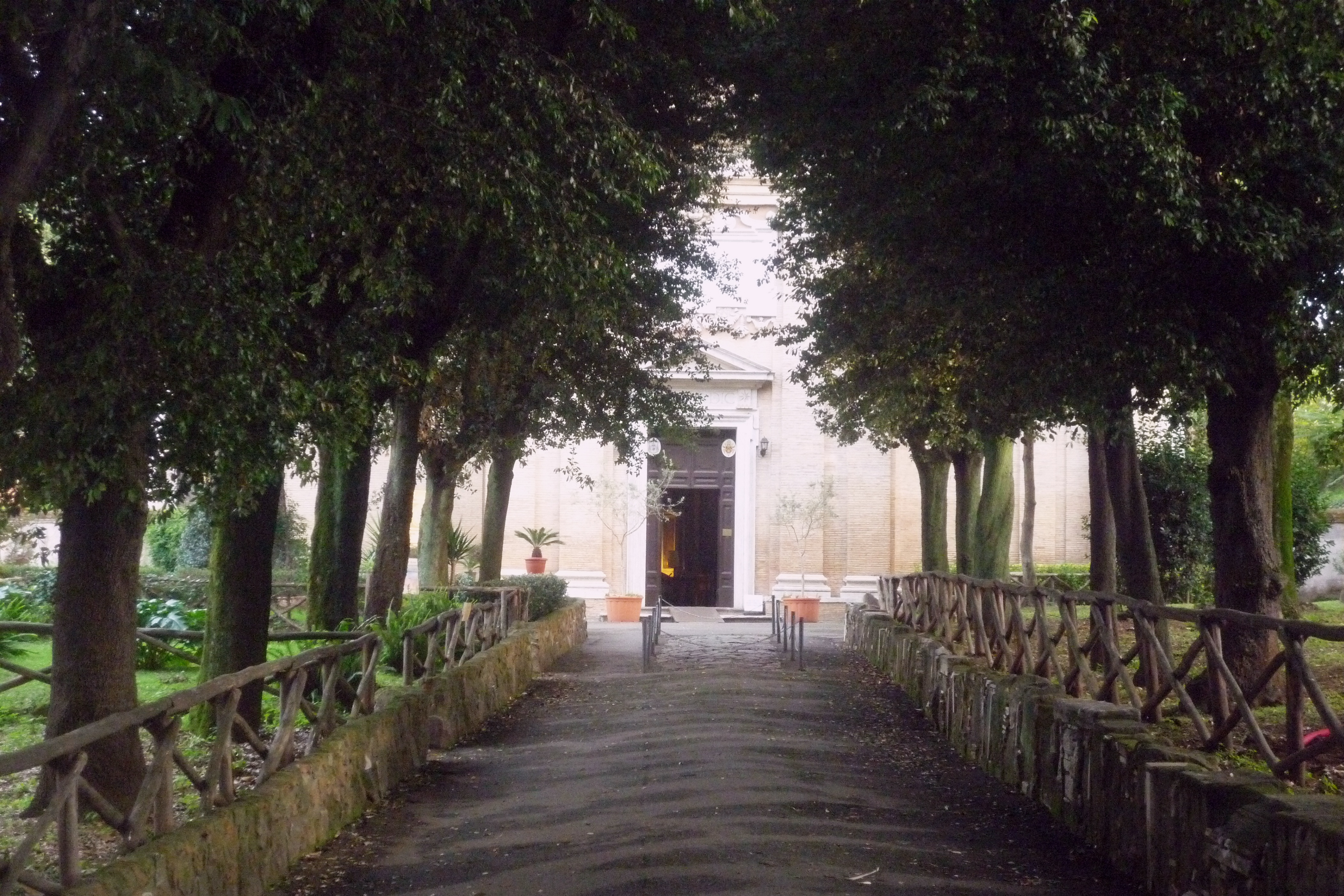
Avenue towards the Church of Saint Paul

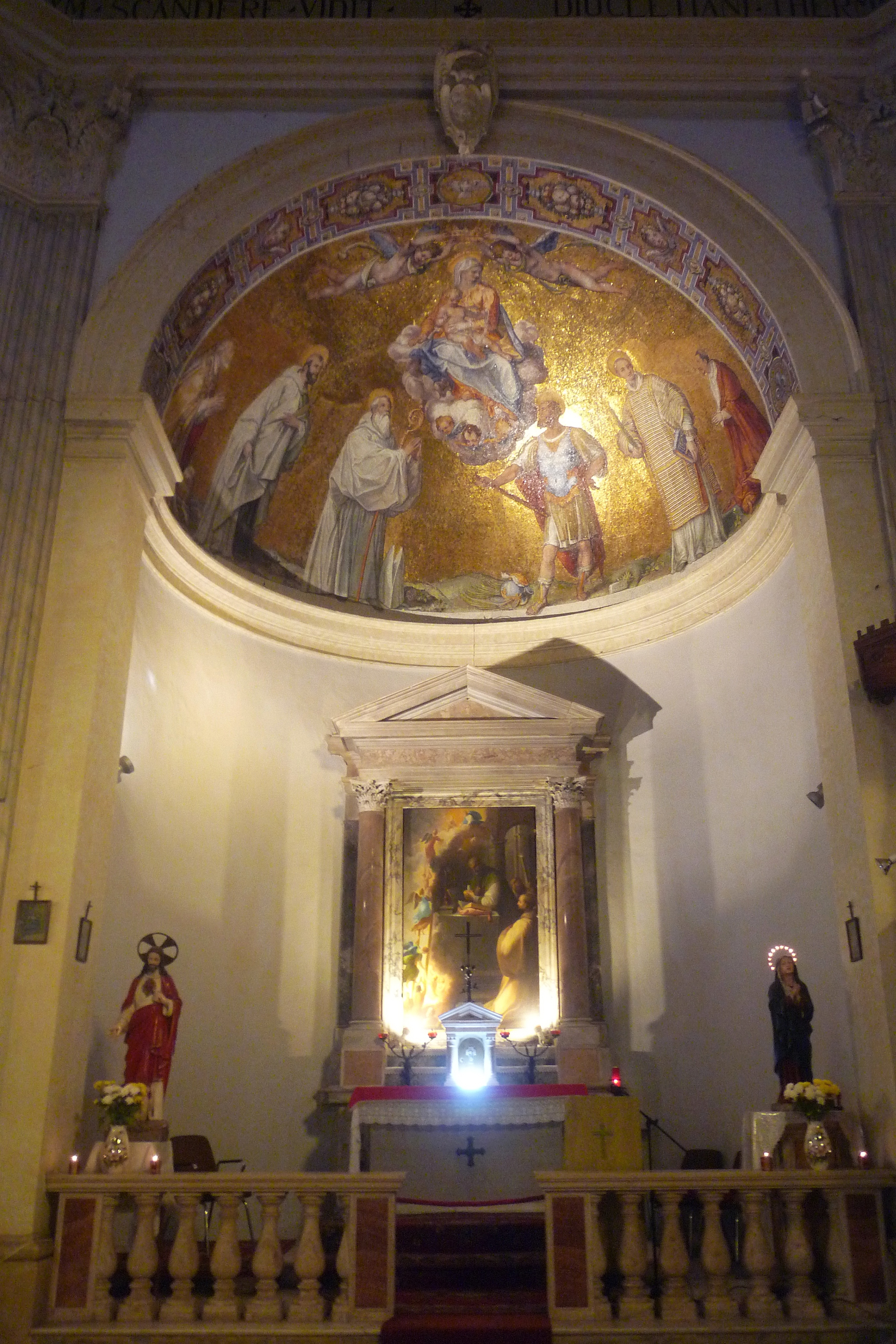
Church of the Santa Maria Scala Coeli (interior)

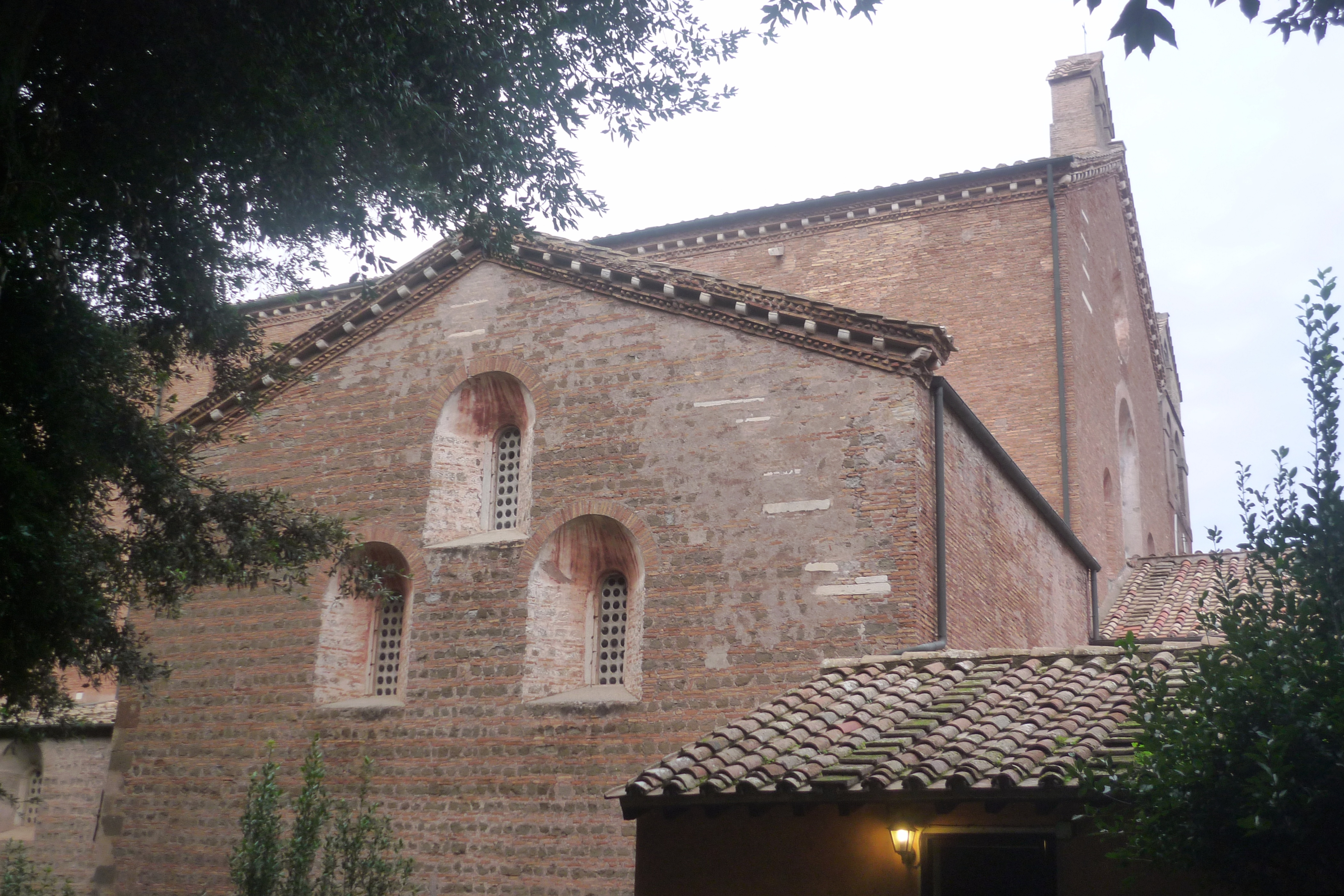
Church of St. Vincent and Anastasius (west flank)

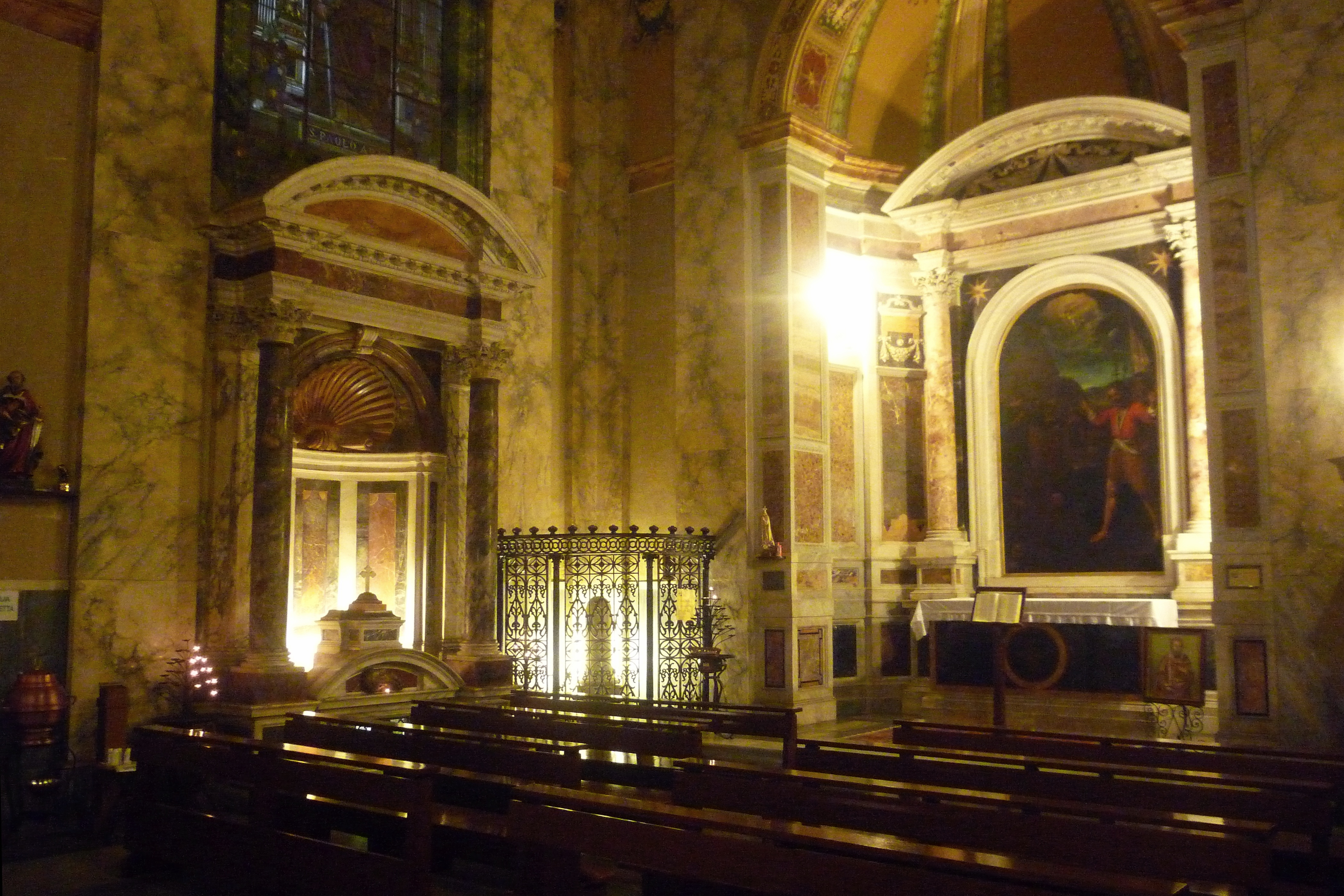
Church of martyrdom of Saint Paul (interior)
