= Tere Liye =

Tere Liye (lit. 'For You') may refer to:

- Tere Liye (film), a 2001 Indian Hindi-language film
- Tere Liye (TV series), an Indian romantic drama television series
- Tere Liye (Atif Aslam song), a song from the 2010 Indian film Prince

== See also ==
- For You (disambiguation)
- Tere Liye (writer) (born 1979), Indonesian writer
