= Men Ajlikom =

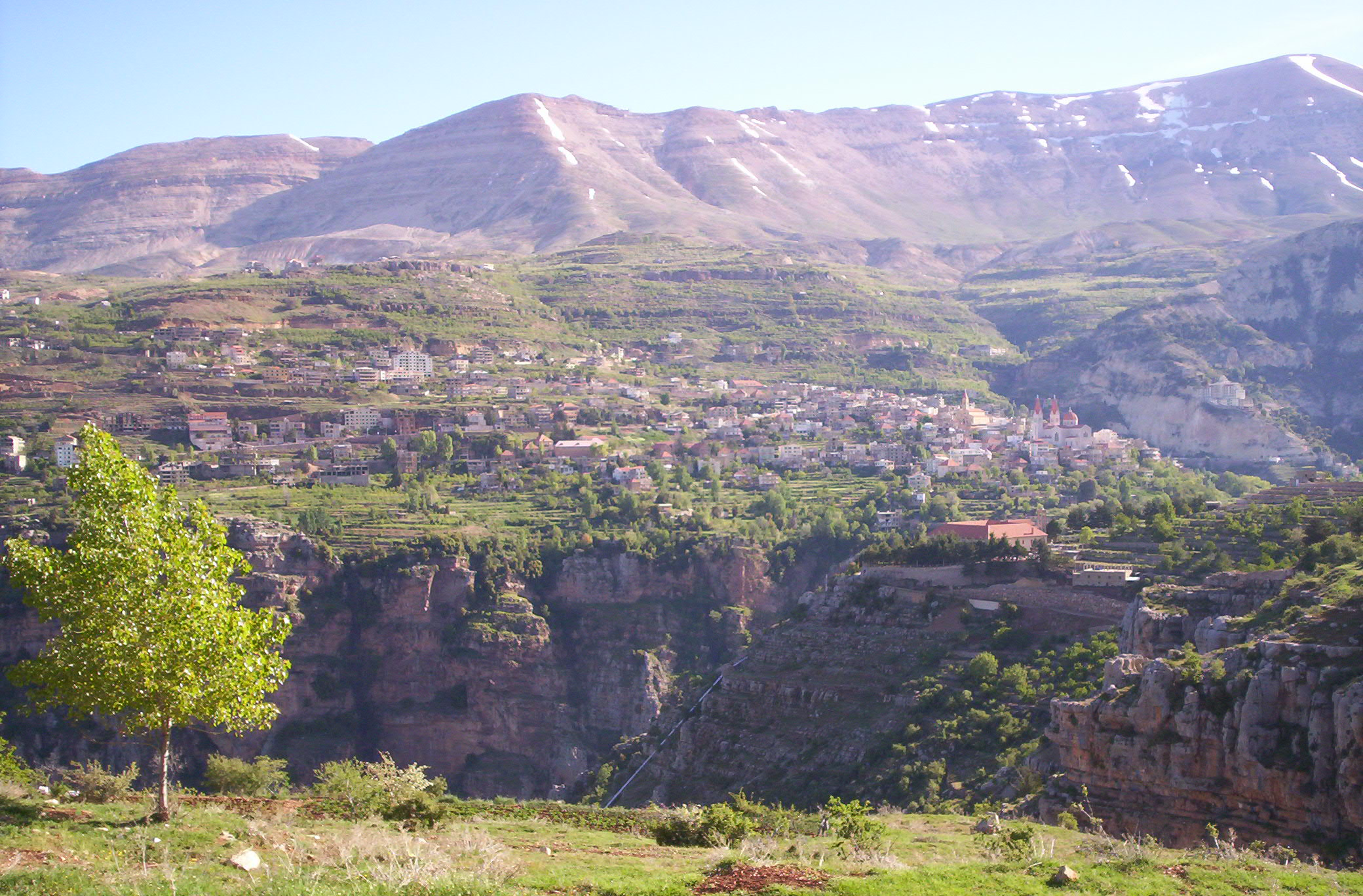
- A filming location
- Arabic: من اجلكم
- Directed by: Fr. Charles Sawaya
- Written by: Fr. Charles Sawaya
- Based on: The Passion by Crucifixion of Jesus
- Produced by: Rachid Rizk
- Starring: Chadi Haddad; Mirana Neeymeh; Nada Saybeh; Georges Bassil
- Cinematography: Milad Tok
- Edited by: Youssef Mouannes; Noraer Sarian
- Music by: Abeer Nehme; Sari Khalifé
- Production company: JuntoBox Films
- Distributed by: Lebanese Broadcasting Corporation
- Release date: March 23, 2015 (Dbayeh (theatrical))
- Running time: 13 minutes
- Country: Lebanon
- Language: Arabic

Men Ajlikom (Arabic: من اجلكم, romanized: min ʾajlikum, lit. 'For You') is a 2015 Lebanese biblical drama film directed by Carmelite Fr. Charles Sawaya and stars Chadi Haddad as Jesus Christ in the first drama film directed by Sawaya after he had entered the monastery. The film had its theatrical premiere on March 26, 2015, in Dbayeh.

== Plot ==
According to the Christian belief, Jesus Christ was sent by God the Father to carry the humans woes. Thus the film starts by showing the pain of humans occurring at the same time with the sufferings of Jesus.

== Cast ==
- Chadi Haddad as Jesus Christ
- Mirana Neeymeh
- Nada Saybeh
- Georges Bassil

== Nomination ==
- 2015, Nomination as Best Actor for Chadi Haddad at the 2015 International catholic film festival
- 2015, Nomination as 'Best Short Film' at the 2015 International Catholic Film Festival.
