= A Song for You (Steve Tyrell album) =

Studio album by Steve Tyrell
- Released: February 9, 2018
- Length: 47:05
- Label: New Design

Professional ratings
Review scores
Source	Rating
AllMusic	3.5/5 stars
Tom Hull	B+

A Song for You is a studio album by American jazz vocalist Steve Tyrell. It was released in February 2018 under New Design Records, and features love songs originally sung by artists such as Van Morrison, Harold Arlen and Johnny Mercer.

== Track listing ==
No.	Title	Original artist	Length
1.	"Someone Like You"	Van Morrison	3:52
2.	"Come Rain or Come Shine"	Harold Arlen, Johnny Mercer	4:42
3.	"Try a Little Tenderness"	Jimmy Campbell and Reg Connelly, Harry Woods	4:18
4.	"A Song for You"	Leon Russell	4:18
5.	"A Sunday Kind of Love"	Barbara Belle, Anita Leonard, Louis Prima, Stan Rhodes	3:31
6.	"When I Fall in Love (feat. Judith Hill)"	Edward Heyman, Victor Young	4:13
7.	"Come Live With Me"	Felice and Boudleaux Bryant	4:07
8.	"You Are So Beautiful (feat. Judith Hill)"	Bruce Fisher, Billy Preston	3:45
9.	"Them There Eyes"	Maceo Pinkard, Doris Tauber, William Tracey	2:56
10.	"To Be Loved"	Tyran Carlo, Berry Gordy, Jackie Wilson	4:05
11.	"The Good Life"	Sacha Distel, Jack Reardon	3:02
12.	"Always on My Mind"	Johnny Christopher, Mark James, Wayne Carson	4:16

Chart (2018)	Peak position
US Top Jazz Albums (Billboard)	3
