= Pontifical Council for Culture =

Former dicastery of the Roman Curia

- Pontificium Consilium de Cultura
- Successor: Dicastery for Culture and Education
- Established: 20 May 1982
- Founder: Pope John Paul II
- Founded at: Vatican City
- Dissolved: 5 June 2022
- Merger of: Pontifical Council for Dialogue with non-Believers
- Purpose: to promote dialogue with other cultures to promote the study of unbelief and of religious indifference
- Parent organization: Roman Curia
- Website: www.cultura.va/content/cultura/en.html

The Pontifical Council for Culture (Latin: Pontificium Consilium de Cultura) was a dicastery of the Roman Curia charged with fostering the relationship of the Catholic Church with different cultures. It was erected by Pope John Paul II on 20 May 1982, in 1993 he merged the Pontifical Council for Dialogue with Non-Believers, which had operated independently since 1965 into it and in 2012 Pope Benedict XVI incorporated the Pontifical Commission for the Cultural Heritage of the Church (erected in 1988, but heir of the Pontifical Commission for religious art, created in 1924) into it. When the Apostolic constitution Praedicate evangelium promulgated by Pope Francis took effect on 5 June 2022, the Pontifical Council for Culture was merged with the Congregation for Catholic Education to create the new Dicastery for Culture and Education.

== Function ==
Following on the emphasis placed by the Second Vatican Council and by Pope Paul VI on the importance of culture for the full development of the human person, the Pontifical Council was established to foster the relationship between the Gospel and cultures, and to study the phenomenon of indifference in matters of religion. It also fosters relationships between the Holy See and exponents of the world of culture and promotes dialogue with the various contemporary cultures.

The Council has two sections: the Faith and Culture section concentrates on the work the Council did before the Council for Non-Believers was merged with it, while the Dialogue with Cultures section continues the work of the latter Council, establishing dialogue with those who do not believe in God or profess no religion, but who are open to genuine cooperation.

The Council cooperates with episcopal conferences, universities and international organizations such as UNESCO with regard to its field of interest.

The permanent staff at the Council's headquarters consists of little more than a dozen people, including the President (currently Gianfranco Ravasi, the Secretary and the Under-Secretary. The Council has a slightly larger number of members, who are usually cardinals and bishops appointed by the Pope for five-year terms, who come together for the three-yearly plenary assemblies to evaluate the day-to-day running of the Council and to consider matters of special importance. The Pope also appoints consultors, who are yet more numerous (priests, religious, and laity predominate in this group), who can be called on at any time for advice and assistance.

== Activities ==
Under the Council's patronage, Liana Marabini launched the International Catholic Film Festival known as "Mirabile Dictu", an independent film festival to promote films covering Roman Catholic topics. The event has been held annually since 2010 in Rome.

The Council organized the Vatican participation in the Venice Biennale in May 2013. Instead of restricting itself to religious art, it asked artists to produce works on the theme "Creation, De-Creation and Re-Creation" in order to "create an atmosphere of dialogue between art and faith". Artists included Studio Azzurro, a Milan-based art collective that produces interactive videos, Czech photographer Josef Koudelka, and abstract painter Lawrence Carroll.

On 19 December 2015, Paul Tighe was appointed the Council's first Adjunct Secretary.

In March 2017, the Council announced the creation of a Feminine Consultation within he Pontifical Council for Culture, with 37 women chosen from a mix of nationalities, religions, professions, political views, and marital status. Ravasi said: "the function of these women is a real function, they are called to express judgments; they have already criticized me on some proposals and have put forward others! For instance, in connection with the forthcoming Plenary Assembly of the dicastery, on neuroscience, artificial intelligence, genetics, robotics, information technology, etc. on all these issues these women have expressed–as scientists and as women–judgments that we would be unable to formulate."

With the Cura Foundation, the Science Theology and the Ontological Quest, and the Stem for Life Foundation, the Council sponsored the Unite to Cure Conference, which met 26–28 April 2018. Under the heading "How Science, Technology and 21st-Century Medicine Will Impact Culture and Society", scientists, government officials, philanthropists, ethicists and faith leaders discussed advances in medical technology and environmental protection and their implications for religion and society.

The Council is also responsible for the Vatican Cricket Team.

== Presidents of the Pontifical Council for Culture ==
- Gabriel-Marie Garrone (20 May 1982 – 19 April 1988)
- Paul Poupard (19 April 1988 – 3 September 2007)
- Gianfranco Ravasi (3 September 2007 – 5 June 2022)
