= San Paolo alle Tre Fontane =

- Church of Saint Paul at the Three Fountains
- Chiesa di San Paolo alle Tre Fontane
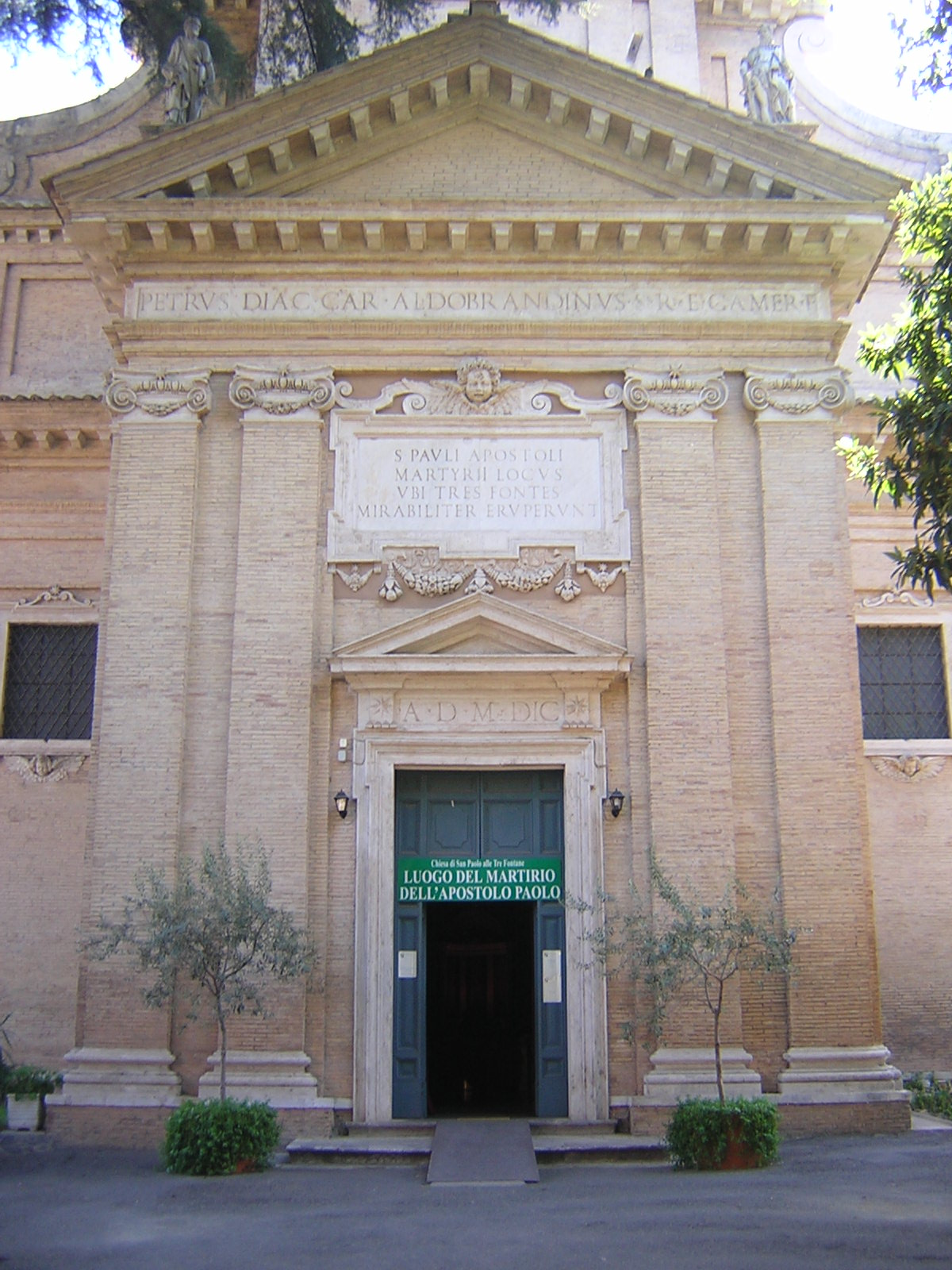
- Façade with roofline statues of Nicolas Cordier
- Click on the map for a fullscreen view
- 41°50′4.08″N 12°28′59.52″E
- Location: Via di Acque Salvie 1, Rome
- Country: Italy
- Language: Italian
- Denomination: Catholic
- Tradition: Roman Rite

History
- Status: titular church
- Founded: AD 625
- Founder: Pope Honorius I
- Dedication: Paul the Apostle

Architecture
- Architectural type: Baroque
- Completed: 1599

Administration
- Diocese: Rome

San Paolo alle Tre Fontane (Italian), in English "St Paul at the Three Fountains" is a Roman Catholic church dedicated to Paul the Apostle, at the presumed site of his martyrdom in Rome. In Latin it is known as Sancti Pauli ad Aquas Salvias ("St Paul at Aquae Salviae"). The church located on the grounds of the Tre Fontane Abbey located on Via di Acque Salvie 1 in the Quartiere Ardeatino (Q. XX.).

Since 2010 the church is a cardinalatial diaconia, with Mauro Piacenza as its cardinal deacon.

== History ==
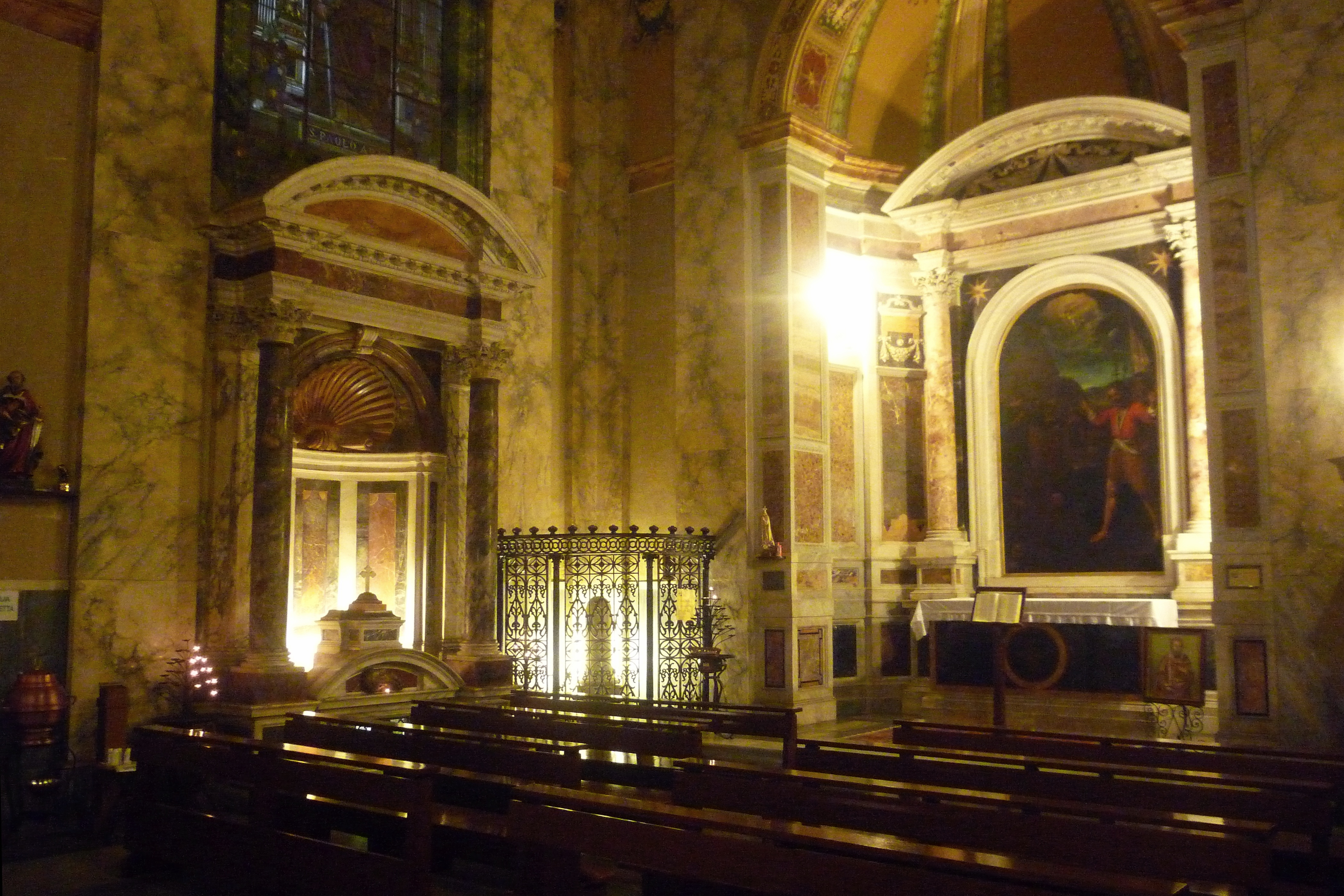
Interior of the church with altar with the depiction of a severed head.

Legend relates that when Paul was decapitated, his head bounced three times and fountains miraculously sprang up at each place where it touched the ground. However, the springs, called the Aquae Salviae, as in the Latin name for the church, were known in pre-Christian times, and excavations have revealed ancient mosaic pavements.

The first church here was built in the 5th century. It was rebuilt in 1599 by Giacomo della Porta under the patronage of Cardinal Pietro Aldobrandini. The church belongs to the Trappist Tre Fontane Abbey, and is one of three churches on the grounds, along with Santa Maria Scala Coeli and Santi Vincenzo e Anastasio.

There are three symbolic monumental covers to the fountains said to have sprung up at Paul's death. The fountains were sealed in 1950 because pollution made it dangerous to drink the water.

A column in the church is said to be the one to which Paul was bound when he was beheaded, but this seems to be a late story and it is probably just a column from Roman ruins nearby. An original Crucifixion canvas by Guido Reni was previously found in the church, it is now located in the Vatican, and replaced by a copy. A chapel on the right has a Decapitation of St Paul by Bartolomeo Passerotti. The church contains polychrome marble including some porphyry columns. The statues on the facade were made by Nicolas Cordier.

Remains of a late Roman mosaic floor are preserved in the nave. It was donated to the church by Pope Pius IX and is said to have been brought here from Ostia, Rome's port in the imperial period.

The 2010 appointment of Cardinal Mauro Piacenza as Cardinal-Deacon of this ancient church marks its first use as a cardinalatial diaconia.

Cardinal Piacenza is said to have made the request for this to be his titular church because he has a long association with and strong devotion to Our Lady of Revelation – a shrine and pilgrimage site across the road from the Tre Fontane Church.
