= A Song for You (TV program) =

Canadian music variety television series

- Genre: music variety
- Country of origin: Canada
- Original language: English
- No. of seasons: 2

Production
- Running time: 15 minutes

Original release
- Network: CBC Television
- Release: 7 July 1962 – 27 June 1964

A Song for You is a Canadian music variety show that aired on CBC Television from 1962 to 1964.

== Premise ==
This Winnipeg-produced program featured musician Jose Poneira (piano and vocals) whose quartet featured James Cordepal (bass), Lenny Breau (guitar) and Robert Gross (drums). Alternate weeks included singer Maxine Ware. Each episode was based on a style of music or a particular theme which was supported by various songs and visiting guest artists.

== Scheduling ==
The first season of this 15-minute program was broadcast on Saturdays at 6:30 p.m. (Eastern) from 7 July to 15 September 1962. From that point, it aired Sundays at 1:00 p.m., then at 12:30 p.m. from 6 October to 29 December 1963. Its final run was broadcast Saturdays 6:30 p.m. from 4 April to 27 June 1964.
