= This One's for You =

This One's for You may refer to:

== Albums ==
- This One's for You (Barry Manilow album) or the title song (see below), 1976
- This One's for You (Deez Nuts album) or the title song, 2010
- This One's for You (Luke Combs album) or the title song, 2017
- This One's for You (OTT album) or the title song, 1997
- This One's for You (Teddy Pendergrass album), 1982
- This One's for You, by David and the Giants, 1978
- This One's for You, an EP by Luke Combs, 2015

== Songs ==
- "This One's for You" (Barry Manilow song), 1976
- "This One's for You" (David Guetta song), the official song of UEFA Euro 2016
- "This One's for You", by the Concretes from The Concretes, 2003
- "This One's for You", by Fleshquartet featuring Robyn, 2006
- "This One's for You", by Stuff from More Stuff
- "This One's for You", by Therapy? from Shameless, 2001

== See also ==
- "Henry James, This One's for You", a 2005 science fiction short story by Jack McDevitt
