= German submarine U-4 =

U-4 may refer to one of the following German submarines:

- SM U-4 (Germany), was a Type U 3 submarine launched in 1909 and served in the First World War as a training submarine; scrapped in 1919
  - During the First World War, Germany also had these submarines with similar names:
    - SM UB-4, a Type UB I submarine launched in 1915 and sunk on 15 August 1915
    - SM UC-4, a Type UC I submarine launched in 1915 and scuttled on 5 October 1918
- German submarine U-4 (1935), a Type IIA submarine that served in the Second World War and was stricken in 1944 and scrapped in 1945
- German submarine U-4 (S183), a Type 205 submarine of the Bundesmarine that was launched in 1962 and scrapped in 1974

U-4 or U-IV may also refer to:

- SM U-4 (Austria-Hungary), a U-3-class submarine of the Austro-Hungarian Navy
