= Santa Maria Scala Coeli =

Church in Rome, Italy

Coordinates: 41.8342°N 12.4831°E

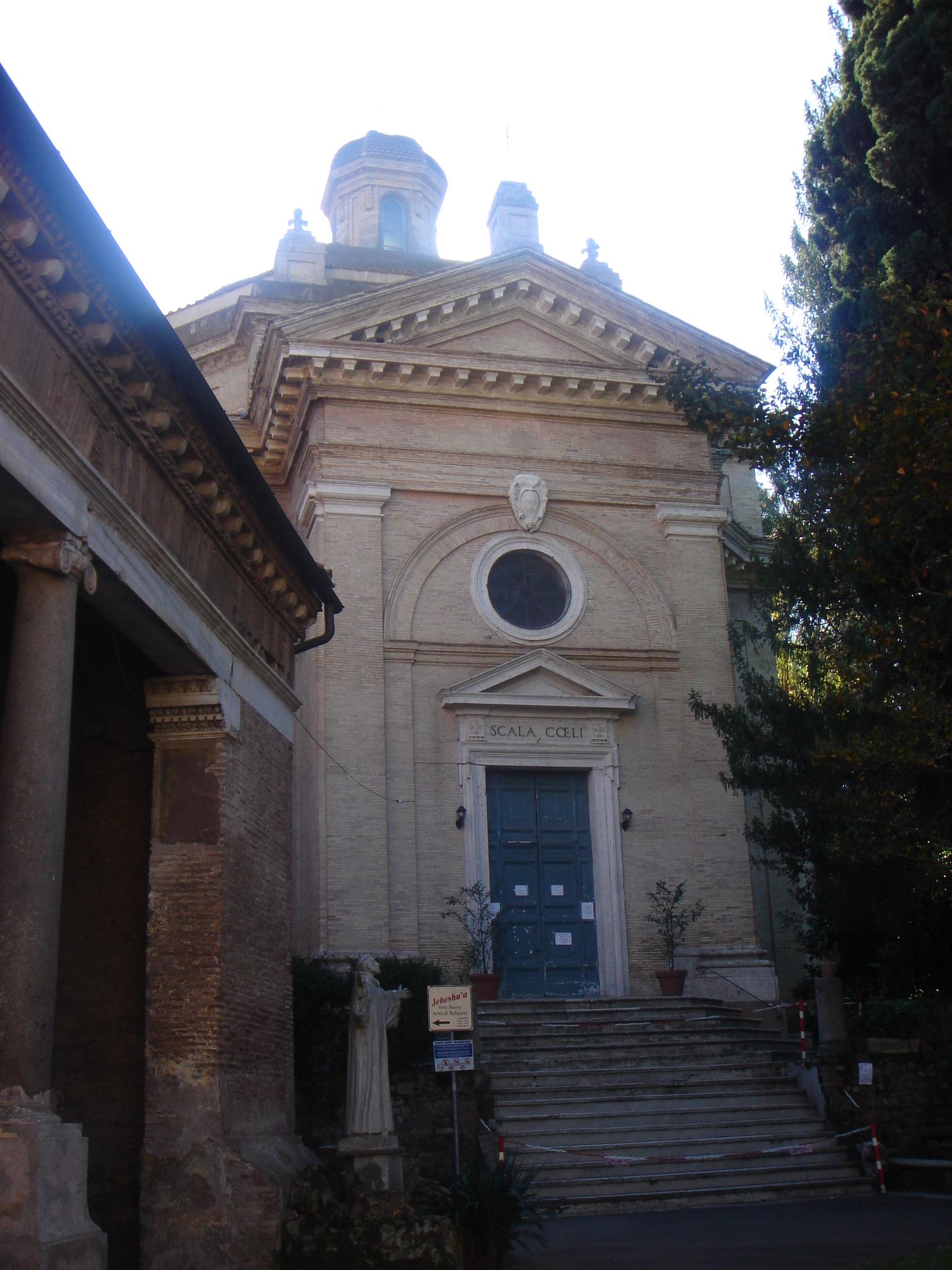
Facade with entrance stairs

Santa Maria Scala Coeli (Saint Mary of the Stairway to Heaven) is a Roman Catholic Church located on the grounds of the Tre Fontane Abbey located on Via di Acque Salvie 1 in the Quartiere Ardeatino (Q. XX.) in Rome. This is one of three churches affiliated with the Trappist monastery, and is located on a small lane, Via delle Tre Fontane, inside the abbey complex. The location of this church is held by tradition to be where St Paul the Apostle was imprisoned. on Via delle Tre Fontane in Rome.

== History ==
An ancient church at the site was refurbished in 1582 by Vignola under the patronage of Cardinal Alessandro Farnese. Subsequently, the present church was designed by Giacomo della Porta under the patronage of Cardinal Pietro Aldobrandini. The interior layout is octagonal. On the stairs leading to it can be seen writing and drawings scratched into the stone, probably information from the architect to the builders. The church presbytery contains a mosaic by Francesco Zucca made after designs of Giovanni della Vecchia.

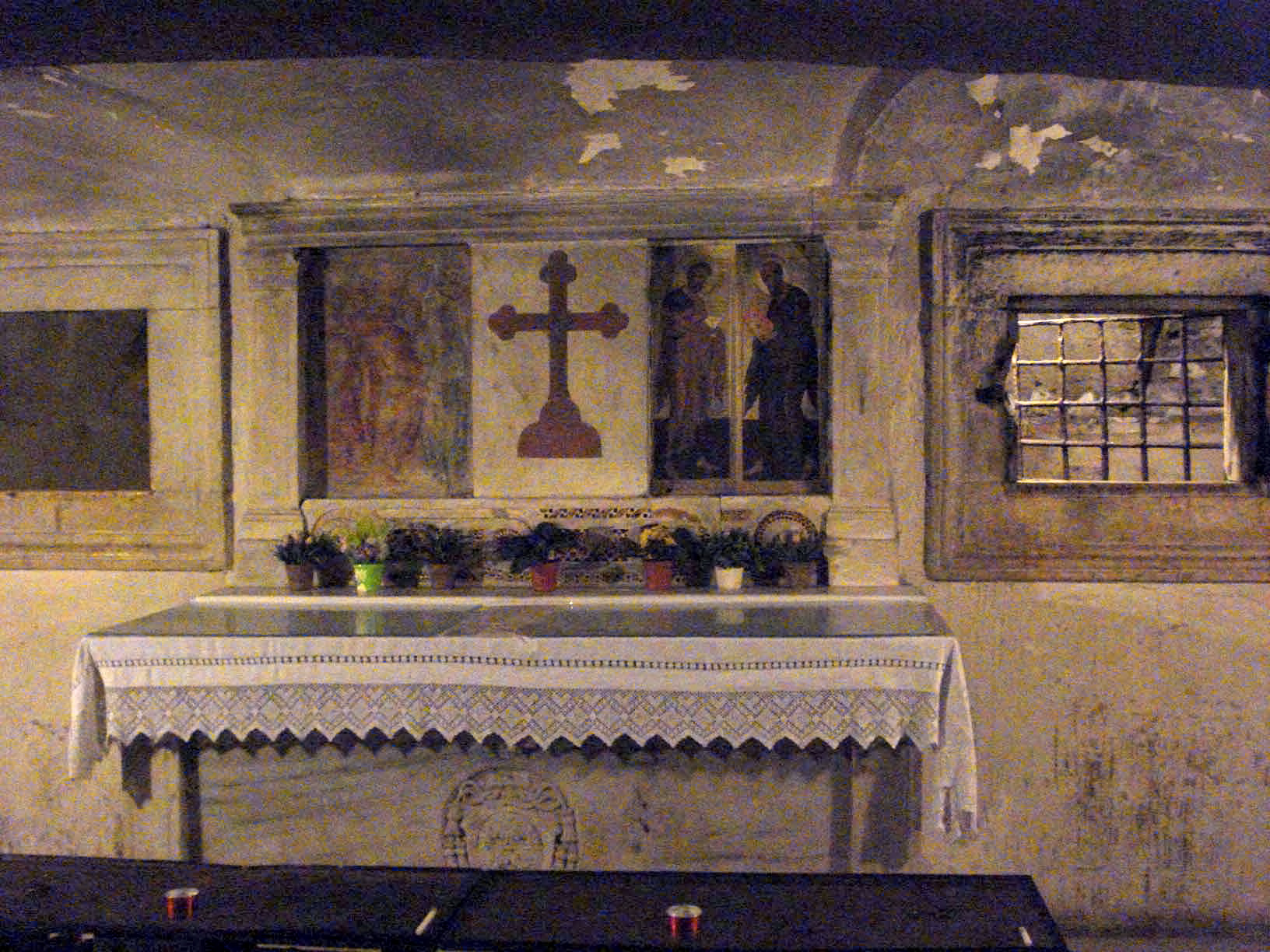
The crypt of the church

An old tradition claims that 10,000 Christian slaves who died while building the Baths of Diocletian are buried in the church's crypt, and are venerated as St Zeno and Companions. Some dead slaves from this project are likely buried in catacombs in the nearby hillside, though the 10,000 figure must be exaggerated.

According to legend, St Bernard had a vision while celebrating a requiem mass at the church. The vision was of the souls in purgatory he was praying for ascending to heaven by a ladder — the Scala Coeli, leading to the church's suffix. This vision was the basis for an indulgence attached to requiem masses celebrated in the church. Later, the indulgence was granted to specific churches outside Rome. In 1500, Henry VII of England was granted the scala coeli indulgence for his new chapel in Westminster Abbey, and the popularity of it in England grew rapidly. By the 1520s, bequests for masses "at Scala Coeli" were common.

The church belongs to the Trappist Tre Fontane Abbey, along with the churches of Santi Vincenzo e Anastasio and San Paolo alle Tre Fontane. The church of Scala Coeli was already used by the Romanian Orthodox community in Rome before November 2002 when, to mark the visit to Rome of Teoctist, Patriarch of Romania, Pope John Paul II officially granted it to them. Previously, they had also gathered in the Chapel of Our Lady of Genezano off Via Cavour, but that chapel had become too small.
