= Roman Historical Institutes =

Historical research bodies

Roman Historical Institutes are collegiate bodies established at Rome, for the purpose of historical research, mostly in the Vatican archives. These have been set both by ecclesiastical authority, and by national governments.

== Opening of the Vatican archives ==
In the 15th and 16th centuries, a number of scholars, beginning with Cæsar Baronius, took an interest in the Vatican archives, and began to collate and publicize some of their contents. This work continued into the 17th and 18th centuries, with support from archive officials such as Augustin Theiner.

Between about 1850 and 1875, a number of researchers, mainly German and Austrian, gained access to the archives. Public interest continued to increase, and under Pope Pius IX it became somewhat easier to obtain permits for private research. In 1879, Pope Leo XIII announced his intention to open the archives more fully, saying "We have nothing to fear from the publication of documents." Despite opposition from several quarters, and some delays in arranging preliminaries, he opened the Vatican secret archives to researchers in 1881. A papal decree on 1 May 1884 set out regulations for their use.

== Research in the Secret Archives ==
Hitherto very little was known of the contents of this vast treasury; now its great wealth came to be widely appreciated - Briefs, Bulls, petitions, department records, reports of nuncios and other reports, diaries, documentary collections, privileges, legal titles of the most miscellaneous kind, etc. Progress was at first rather slow, for no systematic use of the archives could be planned until the workers had familiarized themselves with the material at hand. The hasty treatment that, in the beginning, the thirteenth century material received, revealed how much there was to learn before the archives could be used to the best advantage.

Gradually, order was introduced in all kinds of research work, in which task notable services were rendered by the historical institutes which were established in close relation to the Vatican Archives. Research work in these archives may be divided into individual and collective, or general and special. Individual researches are made by individual scholars, while collective work is conducted by several who have either united for that purpose, or belong permanently to some association. General research devotes itself to the larger outlines of ecclesiastical history, while special research seeks the solution of particular problems, more or less far-reaching in importance. Both methods may be combined, objectively and subjectively; an individual investigator may work at a general theme, while an association may take up the study of a restricted or specific problem, and vice versa. The results of Vatican historical study are to be found in periodicals, essays, and books, also disseminated in large historical collections devoted to other classes of historical material, and containing the results of other investigations, e.g. the "Monumenta Germaniæ Historica". A study of the published material exhibits long series of original documents, narratives based on copious documentary material, and occasionally narratives based on information obtained in the archives, but unaccompanied by the documents or by reference to them.

== Fields of investigation ==
While it is but natural that the study of documents should be chiefly done in the Vatican archives, most investigators also carry on work in the important collection of printed books known as the Vatican Library. In October, 1892, there was opened in connexion with the archives and the library a consultation library, the "Bibliotheca Leoniana", in order to facilitate research, historical and Biblical. Governments, academies, libraries, archives, and corporations contributed to it, and it has already reached very large proportions. The archives themselves are so organized that nearly every student of history may discover there something of special importance in his own province. The numerous other archives and manuscript-collections of Rome are also open, as a rule, to the student; indeed, few workers limit themselves exclusively to Vatican materials. Moreover, studies begun in the Vatican are often supplemented by scientific excursions to other Italian cities, either on the student's homeward journey or during some vacation period; such excursions have at times resulted in surprising discoveries. An exhaustive examination of Italian archives and libraries leads occasionally to a larger view of the subject than was originally intended by the investigator, for whom in this way new questions of importance spring up, the definite solution of which becomes highly desirable. Experience, therefore, and the detailed study of the numerous repertories, indexes, and inventories of manuscripts, have made it necessary to organize permanently the scientific historical researches carried on in the interest of any given country. This means a saving of money and of labour; in this way also more substantial achievements can be hoped for than from purely individual research. Consequently, institutes for historical research were soon founded in Rome, somewhat on the plan of the earlier archæological societies. While the opening of such institutes is a nobile officium of any government, private associations have made serious sacrifices in the same direction and sustained with success the institutes they have called into life. The state institutes investigate all that pertains to national relations or intercourse (religion, politics, economics, science, or art) with the Curia, with Rome, or, for that matter, with Italy. Many of these institutes do not attempt to go further, and their field is certainly comprehensive and in itself admirable. Others devote themselves to similar researches, but do not neglect general questions of interest to universal history, profane or ecclesiastical, or to the history of medieval culture. Of course, only the larger institutes, with many workers at their disposal, can satisfactorily undertake problems of this nature.

== Historical Institutes ==
=== England ===
At the end of 1876, Joseph Stevenson, who was employed by the English Public Record Office to obtain transcripts of documents of historical importance in the Vatican archives, resigned his appointment, and Sir Thomas Hardy, on Cardinal Manning's recommendation, appointed William Henry Bliss as his successor. For years Stevenson and Bliss conducted their researches alone.

Later other English investigators were detailed to Rome to co-operate with Bliss and hasten the progress of his work. Bliss died very suddenly of pneumonia; English investigators continued the work, under direction of the Record Office. Five volumes of Calendars of Entries in the Papal Registers relating to Great Britain and Ireland, by Bliss and collaborators, were published.

In addition to the medieval material, numerous extracts and transcripts of a political nature were made from sixteenth- and seventeenth-century documents, transmitted to the Record Office and partly used in the Calendars of State Papers.

=== France ===
The Ecole Française de Rome, originally one with that of Athens, employs almost constantly historical investigators at the Grande Archivio of Naples; they devote themselves to the documents of the Angevin dynasty. This institute has an organ of its own, the "Mélanges d'archéologie et d'histoire", in whose pages are found not only historical studies properly so called, but also papers on the history of archæology and of art. The institute has its home in the Palazzo Farnese, where its director lives, and where a rich library is housed. It was founded in 1873, and during the reign of Pius IX, long before the opening of the secret archives, inaugurated its great achievement, the editing of the papal Regesta of the thirteenth century. Scholars of international reputation have figured among its directors, including Louis Duchesne.

The "Bibliothèque des Ecoles Françaises d'Athènes et de Rome", is made up of lengthy monographs by pupils of the Ecole, treating of divers subjects connected with their studies in the Vatican archives and library. The papal "Regesta" of the thirteenth century, the "Liber Pontificalis", and the "Liber Censuum" (Fabre-Duchesne) form a second series of historical publications to the credit of the French school. A third series is made up of documents selected from the fourteenth-century papal "Regesta", and is entitled "Lettres des papes d'Avignon se rapportant à la France". The slow progress of so many learned enterprises is a matter of general regret, nor can one always approve the methods employed, though no one can deny the very great utility of these scholarly studies and researches for the history of the papacy and its international relations. The chaplains of the French National Institute of St-Louis des Français have recently undertaken a work closely related to that of the Ecole Française, the publication in concise regesta-like form of all letters of the Avignon popes. Gratifying progress is being made with the "Regesta" of John XXII. The review known as the "Annales de St-Louis des Français", whose contributions to ecclesiastical history were noteworthy, has been discontinued. Other works of a learned historical nature have been published by the chaplains of this institute, the results of their diligent researches in the Vatican archives.

=== German Catholic Institutes ===
The chaplains of the German national institute of Santa Maria di Campo Santo Teutonico were among the first to profit by the opening of the secret archives for the conduct of scientific research in the field of German ecclesiastical history. The director of the institute, Anton de Waal, founded the "Römische Quartalschrift für Archäologie und Kirchengeschichte" as a centre for historical research more modest and limited in scope. To the students of history at the Campo Santo is owing the founding, at Rome, of the Görres Society Historical Institute. This institute, established after long hesitation, sufficiently explained by the slender resources of the society, is now a credit to its founders (besides regular reports, begun in 1890, on the work of this institute, and filed in the records of the society, see Cardauns, "Die Görres Gesellschaft, 1876-1901", Cologne, 1901, pp. 65–73). In 1900 a new department was added and placed under the guidance of Joseph Wilpert, for the study of Christian archæology and the history of Christian art. The Roman labours of the Görres Society Institute deal chiefly with nunciature reports, the administration records of the Curia since 1300, and the Acts of the Council of Trent. Other publications, more or less broad in scope, are published regularly in the "Historisches Jahrbuch", among its "Quellen und Forschungen", or in other organs of the Görres Society. The twelve volumes in which this institute proposes to edit exhaustively the Acts and records of the Council of Trent, represented one of the most difficult tasks which could be set before a body of workers in the Vatican archives. The aforesaid investigation of medieval papal administration and financial records, which the institute investigates in cooperation with the Austrian Leo Society, open up a chief source of information for the history of the Curia in the fourteenth and fifteenth centuries.

The Görres Society Institute maintains at Rome no library of its own, but aids efficiently in the growth of the fine library at the Campo Santo Teutonico, near the Vatican. The Leo Society supports at Rome a trained investigator, who devotes his time to publications from the papal treasury (Camera), records of the later Middle Ages. The present director of the Görres Society Institute is Stefan Heid.

=== Austria ===
The Austrian institute (Instituto Austriaco di studi storici), established by Theodor von Sickel, and then directed by Ludwig von Pastor, was set up in 1883. It cooperated in the publication of the nunciature reports, and contemplates the publication of the correspondence of the legates and the ambassadors at the Council of Trent.

Among the publications of this institute are Sickel's study on the "Privilegium Ottonianum"; his edition of the "Liber Diurnus"; and his "Römische Berichte" (Roman reports). Studies by this institute appeared in the "Mittheilungen des österreichischen Institutes für Geschichtsforschung", dealing with the work of the medieval papal chancery, while Ottenthal's "Chancery Rules" and Tangl's "Chancery Regulations" are standard works on the Middle Ages. Numerous historical commissions were sent from Bohemia to Rome (concerning which, see below).

=== Prussia ===
A short history of the founding of the Prussian historical institute was published by Friedensburg (Berlin, Academy of Sciences). The project dated back to 1883, but it was not until May 1888 that Konrad Schottmüller succeeded in opening a Prussian Historical Bureau that began modestly enough, but soon developed into the actual Prussian Institute, reorganized (12 November 1902) on a materially enlarged scale, and now the most important of all historical institutes at Rome, owing largely to the efforts of its present director, Kehr. In addition to the general work of historical investigations, special departments are conducted for the history of art and for patristic and Biblical research. Besides its own publication, "Quellen und Forschungen aus italienischen Archiven" the German Historical Institute in Rome (DHI Rome) today issues a series of German nunciature reports (eleven volumes since 1897). The library of the institute, besides extensive monographs on various subjects, has published the useful "Repertorium Germanicum", and, in co-operation with the Instituto Storico Italiano, the "Registrum chartarum Italiæ", a series of independent volumes. These researches take in Italian, German, French, English, and Spanish archives; Austria and Switzerland are likewise visited occasionally. The library of the institute ranks, with that of the Palazzo Farnese, among the best historical libraries in Rome.

=== Hungary ===
The "Hungaricorum Historicorum Collegium Romanum", no longer in existence, owed its inception in 1892 to the efforts of Vilmos Fraknói, and published under his direction (since 1897) the "Monumenta Vaticana historiam regni Hungariæ illustrantia", whose two series in ten folio volumes are a lasting tribute to the munificence of Fraknói. Other noteworthy monographs based on Roman documents and illustrating the history of Hungary must be credited to this institute.

=== Belgium ===
The "Institut historique Belge à Rome" was founded in 1902 and opened in 1904. It is now located in the Academia Belgica. The minister of state defined its purpose to be the searching of Italian archives, and especially those of the Vatican, for historical material bearing on Belgium, and the publication of the results obtained. The project included a centre for individual Belgian investigators as well as for students assisted by the State, where all might find an adequate library and facilities for securing historical data of every kind. The institute, it was hoped, would eventually become an "Ecole des hautes études" for the study of ecclesiastical and profane history, classical philology, archæology, and the history of art. Its first director was Ursmer Berlière, of the Abbey of Maredsous (1904–1907); his successor was Godefroid Kurth, professor emeritus at the University of Liège. The institute has published numerous volumes of "Analecta Vaticano-Belgica".

=== Netherlands ===
The Netherland institute grew out of various historical commissions, the last of which was established 20 May 1904. Its two representatives, Brom and Orbaan, were appointed on 31 March 1906, director and secretary respectively of the state institute founded on this date, and of which they thus became the first members (Brom, "Nederlandsche gesehiedvorsching en Rome", 1903). This institute aims at a systematic investigation of Holland's ecclesiastical and political relations, and of her artistic, scientific, and economic relations, with Rome and Italy during the fourteenth, fifteenth, and sixteenth centuries, a period of very great importance for Holland. A yearly report of the institute and its library appears at The Hague in "Verslagen omtrent's Rikjs onde archieven". Besides a number of essays and minor works, there appeared at The Hague, during 1908, a work by Brom, "Archivalia in Italie"; part I, Rome, "Vaticaansch Archief". All historical material in Italian archives bearing on the Netherlands will be concisely described in this series of volumes; the first part contains 2650 numbers, and is specially valuable because of the excellent conspectus it offers of the contents of the Vatican archives. A work by Orbaan, on Dutch scholars and artists in Rome, is ready for the press (1910).

== Other researches ==
The institutes above-mentioned offer a very incomplete idea of the historical work done in the Vatican archives. Many Frenchmen, Germans, Austrians, Belgians, and others flock to Rome and spend much of their time in private investigations of their own. Most of these workers attach themselves to some institute and profit by its experience. Among Americans we may mention Charles Homer Haskins, who familiarized himself with the treasures contained in the archives and library, and made a report on the same for the "American Historical Review", reprinted in the "Catholic University Bulletin", Washington, 1897, pp. 177–196; P. de Roo, who laboured for several years on the "Regesta" of Alexander VI; Heywood, who compiled the "Documenta selecta e tabulario Sanctæ Sedis, insulas et terras anno 1492 repertas a Christophoro Columbo respicientia", which he published in phototype in 1892. Other American scholars have profited largely by the immemorial academic hospitality of the popes. Special mention should be made here of the studies of Luka Jelic and Conrad Eubel concerning early missionary enterprises, and of an essay by Shipley on "The Colonization of America" (Lucerne, 1899). For other valuable information see the tenth volume of the "Records of the American Catholic Historical Society of Philadelphia". The time would seem to be at hand for the foundation of an American Catholic historical institute, which would take over the task of collecting and publishing in a systematic way the numerous important documents concerning the American Church preserved in many places at Rome, particularly in the Propaganda archives. Russia has sent historical commissions to Rome repeatedly, and for several years at a time. The names of Schmurlow, Brückner, Pierling, Forster, Wiersbowski, and others are sufficient reminders of the excellent work accomplished. From Japan came Murakami, to explore the Propaganda and Vatican archives for a history of the Catholic missions to Japan (1549–1690). Denmark is represented among the investigators by such names as Moltesen, Krarup, and Lindback; Norway by Storm, and Sweden by Tegnér, Elof, Karlson, and others. Moritz Stern, Felix Vernet, and others obtained at the Vatican material for a history of the Hebrews. The Spanish Government was long officially represented by the famous Spanish historian, Ricardo de Hinojosa, while researches in Portuguese history are conducted by MacSwiney. Switzerland entered into this peaceful competition by the labours of Kirsch and Baumgarten in 1899, and since the close of the last century many Swiss have visited Rome for Vatican researches, both as individuals and on official missions. We need only mention the names of Büchi, Wirz, Bernoulli, Steffens, Reinhard, and Stückelberg.

In addition to these and many more names, we must mention the numerous religious who seek in the archives material for general ecclesiastical history, or the history of their order, e. g. the Benedictines and the Bollandists. The writer has work in the archives during the last twenty-one years Dominicans, Jesuits, Franciscans, Minor Conventuals, Capuchins, Trinitarians, Cistercians, Benedictines, Basilians, Christian Brothers, Lateran Canons Regular, Vallombrosans, Camaldolese, Olivetans, Silvestrines, Carthusians, Augustinians, Mercedarians, Barnabites, and others. Women have at times secured admittance, though for reasons this is now restricted. Since 1879 the archives have welcomed Catholics, Protestants, Hebrews, believers and infidels, Christians and heathens, priests and laymen, men and women, rich and poor, persons of high social standing and plain citizens, of every nation and language. The writer is acquainted with nearly all the archives of Europe, and knows that none of them afford similar facilities to the historical student or extend him more courtesy. The number of visitors is at all times higher than to other archives, while the freedom allowed in the use of the material is the most far-reaching known; practically nothing is kept hidden.

== Results of research ==
It is not easy to determine which branch of historical science derives most benefit from Vatican research, nor is the question a simple one. Chronologically, there is no doubt that so far the most favoured period is that of the thirteenth and fourteenth centuries. The sixteenth century comes next, much light being shed on it by the nunciature reports and the Acts of the Council of Trent. The seventeenth, eighteenth, and nineteenth centuries have hitherto been represented by few works, and these not very comprehensive. From the standpoint of subjects treated, Vatican research falls into three parts:

- (1) The study of the ecclesiastical relations of Rome with individual nations or peoples;
- (2) Roman ecclesiastical administration in all its details;
- (3) the influence exerted by the papacy on the civilized world, whether purely political or of a mixed political and religious nature.

If we consider the medieval period under the first of these subdivisions the results obtained are substantially as follows:

- (a) compilation of correct lists of bishops and titular bishops;
- (b) investigation of the so-called Servitia (communia et secreta), i. e. of certain dues paid at Rome, among them pallium dues;
- (c) completer lists of bishoprics, abbeys, prelateships and churches directly subject to the Holy See;
- (d) lists, as complete as possible, of all kinds of papal ordinances, processes decisions, constitutions, and decrees;
- (e) study of the entire system of minor benefices in so far as affected by curial reservations;
- (f) selection from the petition files of all requests growing out of the said system;
- (g) reports of bishops on the state of their dioceses, and consistorial processes;
- (h) investigation into the influence of the Inquisition, to determine how far the respective local authorities were influenced by the Curia;
- (i) inquiry into the taxes imposed on clergy and Churches for purely ecclesiastical purposes, and into the ways and means of collecting these taxes.

For certain dioceses, ecclesiastical provinces, regions, or entire countries, all these data, together with other items of information, have in the course of time been gathered, and published, by individuals and by associations. They have also, in a general way, been made generally accessible by the publication, as a whole, of the respective papal registers (see Papal registers), e. g. the "Regesta" publications of the French institute, and the cameral (papal fiscal) reports of the Görres and Leo societies. "Chartularia", or collections of papal Bulls have been published not only for Westphalia, Eastern and Western Prussia, Utrecht, Bohemia, Salzburg, Aquileia, but also for Denmark, Poland, Switzerland, Great Britain, Ireland, and Germany (Repertorium Germanicum), not to speak of other countries. Many a student of the Vatican archives has devoted all his time to a single subject, e. g. Armellini, "Le Chiese di Roma"; Storm, "Die Obligationen der norwegischen Prälaten von 1311-1523"; Samaran-Mollat, "La fiscalité pontificale en France au 14me siècle"; Berlière, "Les 'Libri Obligationum et Solutionum' des archives vaticanes", for the Dioceses of Cambrai, Liège, Thérouanne, and Tournai; Rieder, "Römische Quellen zur Konstanzer Bisthumsgeschichte (1305-1378)".

The work done in the second subdivision is of significant importance for questions of history, canon law, and general and medieval culture. The rather influential activity of the medieval popes has been richly illustrated by various investigators, e. g. Göller on the records of the "Pœnitentiaria"; Kirsch and Baumgarten on the finances (officials, administration) of the College of Cardinals; Baumgarten on the respective offices of the vice-chancellor and the "Bullatores", the residence-quarters of the Curia, its Cursores or messengers; Watzl, Göller, and Schäfer on the finance bureau of the Curia; von Ottenthal on the secretaries and the "Chancery rules"; Tangl and Erler respectively on the "Chancery regulations" and the "Liber Cancellariæ"; Kehr, Berlière, and Rieder on the petition files (libelli supplices), etc. The student may find quite helpful illustrations of these delicate labours in the editions of the "Liber Pontificalis" by Duchesne; the "Liber Censuum" by Duchesne-Fabre; the "Italia Pontificia" by Kehr; the "Hierarchia Catholica Medii Ævi" by Eubel; the "Catalogue of Cardinals" by Cristofori; the "Acts of the Council of Trent", by Ehses, Merkle, and Buschbell, not to speak of numerous other valuable works. As to the third subdivision, i. e. the purely political, or politico-ecclesiastical activities of the popes, no clearly defined distinction can be made, either in the Middle Ages or in more modern times, between these activities and the exercise of purely ecclesiastical authority; their numerous manifestations may be studied in the publications briefly described above. Abundant information is to be found in the publications of the papal "Regesta" and the "Camera" or treasury, records. We learn from them many curious items of profane history, e. g. the population of various kingdoms, grants of tithes to kings and rulers for political purposes, etc. The nunciature reports are rich in this information.

In a general way the Vatican archives and these new historical Roman institutes have been particularly helpful towards a better knowledge of the ecclesiastico-religious relations of individual dioceses, countries, and peoples with the head of the Church and its central administration. So numerous have been the results of investigation published along these lines, that it has hitherto been impracticable to prepare an exhaustive bibliography of the works based on studies in the Vatican archives. Melampo and Ranuzzi, following in the footsteps of Meister, have recently published a very useful, but not at all exhaustive, list of all the books and essays of this kind which had appeared up to 1900: "Saggio bibliografico dei lavori eseguiti nell' Archivio Vaticano" (Rome, 1909).

== See also ==
- Index of Vatican City-related articles
