= Joseph Wilpert =

German archaeologist, Roman Catholic priest and iconographer

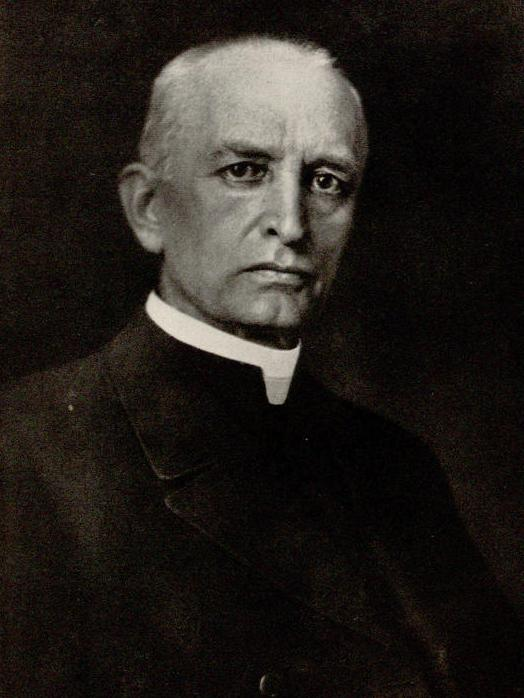
Joseph Wilpert, photographed in 1903, publication year of his best-known works.

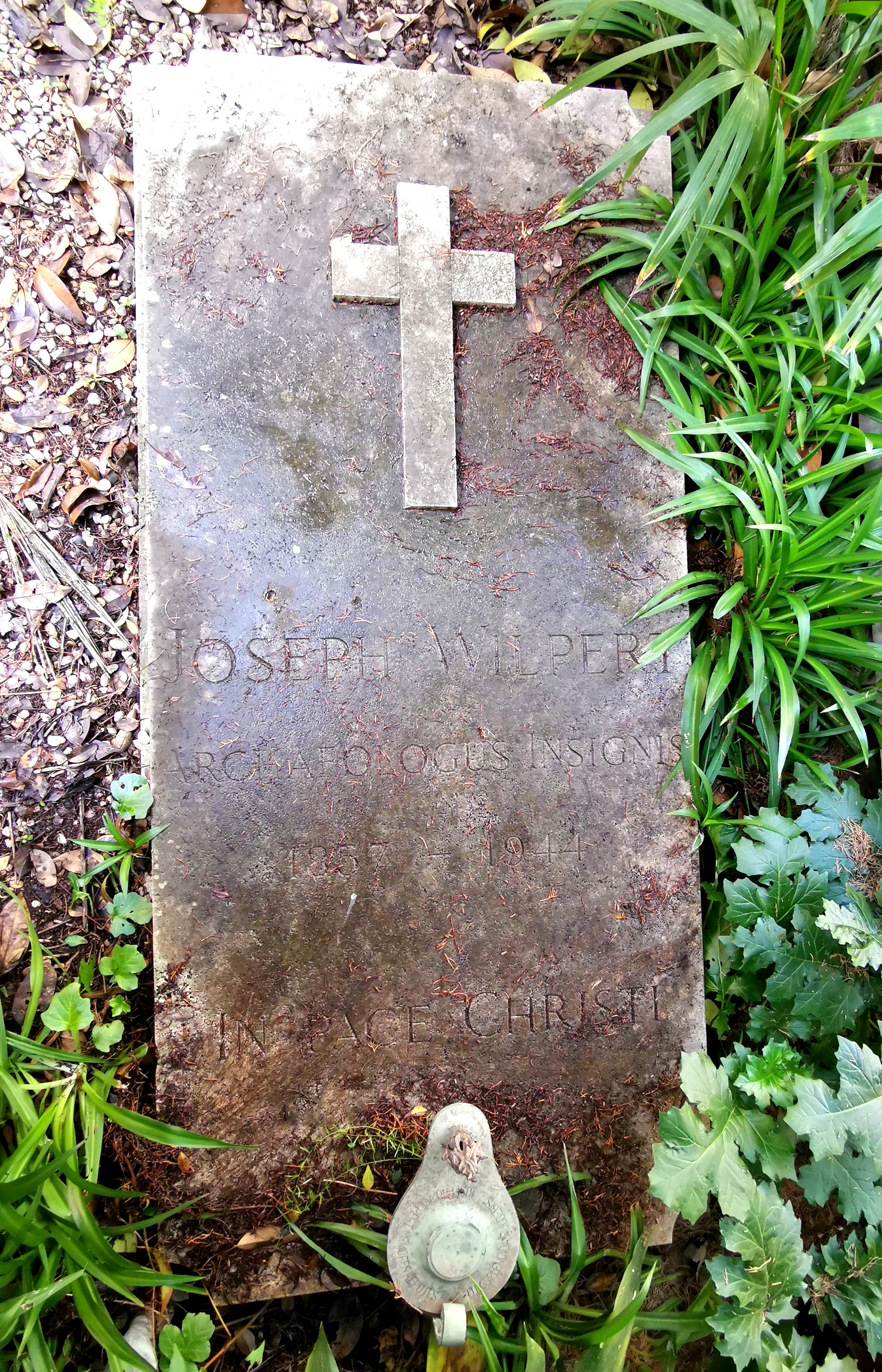
His grave.

Joseph Wilpert (22 August 1856 – 13 February 1944) was a German archaeologist, Roman Catholic priest, scholar of iconography and member of the German Archaeological Institute.

== Life ==
He was born into a rural family in Eiglau near Bauerwitz (then in Upper Silesia in Prussia and now in Poland), the second of five children of Anastasius and Marianna Wilpert. As a twelve-year-old he began studying at the gymnasium in Leobschütz (Głubczyce), ending his studies there in 1877 and the following year joined the University of Innsbruck to study philosophy, switching to theology after a a year's military service starting in 1880. In 1878 he joined the AV Austria Innsbruck in the Cartellverband. He was ordained a priest on 2 July 1883.

On 10 October 1884 he became a chaplain at the Campo Santo Teutonico in Rome and began training as an archaeologist. He learned under Anton de Waal, rector of the Campo Santo, and chaplain and 'convictor' Johann Peter Kirsch, becoming lifelong friends with both of them. Rome thus became his homeland, only leaving during the First World War (when all Germans were expelled) or on research trips to view sarcophagi in France, Spain, Algeria and Tunisia. He was heavily influenced by Giovanni Battista de Rossi, the founder of Christian archaeology.

He was passionate about drawing and produced more than 600 reproductions of the cemeteries' frescoes based on photographs. In 1891 he left the Campo Santo to live in the home of Monsignore Germano Straniero near the Lateran, then from 1921 in the Teutonic Institute, where he died as the result of a fall. He was buried at the Teutonic Cemetery.

== Offices and honours ==
He never held an official office or position, but his earliest publications earned him the title of papal chamberlain in 1891 and an honorary doctorate of the Royal Academy of Munster in 1892. He was commissioned by Franz Joseph I to deliver Kolos Ferenc Vaszary his cardinal's biretta in 1893, the same year as William II granted him his first order, the Royal Order of the Crown, 2nd class. In 1896 he was made a papal house prelate and in 1903 an apostolic protonotary de numero (as a member of the commission of seven papal notaries), an office with a small salary, and finally as dean of the apostolic protonotaries. In 1926 the new Pontifical Institute for Christian Archaeology under his friend Kirsch made Wilpert an honorary professor – he taught there until 1936.

== Selected works ==
=== In German ===
- Topographische Studien über die christlichen Monumente der Appia und der Ardeatina (1901).
- Zur Entdeckung der «Crypta Damasi» (1903).
- Beiträge zur christlichen Archäologie (1908).
- Die römischen Mosaiken und Malereien der kirchlichen Bauten vom IV. bis XIII. Jahrhundert (1916).
- Erlebnisse und Ergebnisse im Dienste der christlichen Archäologie (1930).

=== In Italian ===
- Le pitture delle catacombe romane (1903), 2 vv.
- La scoperta delle basiliche cimiteriali dei SS. Marco, Marcelliano e Damaso (1903).
- La cripta dei Papi e la cappella di S. Cecilia nel cimitero di S. Callisto (1910).
- I sarcofagi cristiani antichi (1929).
- La fede nella Chiesa nascente, secondo i monumenti dell'arte funeraria antica (1938).

== Bibliography ==
- (in German) Stefan Heid (ed.): Giuseppe Wilpert archeologo cristiano (= Sussidi allo studio delle antichità cristiane. Bd. 22). Atti del Convegno (Roma, 16–19 May 2007). Pontificio Istituto di Archeologia Cristiana, Città del Vaticano 2009, ISBN 978-88-85991-50-7 – includes a complete list of Wilpert's works
- (in German) Stefan Heid: Art. Joseph Wilpert. In: Stefan Heid, Martin Dennert (Hrsg.): Personenlexikon zur Christlichen Archäologie. Forscher und Persönlichkeiten vom 16. bis zum 21. Jahrhundert, Bd. 1. Schnell & Steiner, Regensburg 2012, ISBN 978-3-7954-2620-0, S. 1323–1325.
- Nicolaus Heutger (1998). "Wilpert, Joseph. W.". In Bautz, Traugott (ed.). Biographisch-Bibliographisches Kirchenlexikon (BBKL) (in German). Vol. 13. Herzberg: Bautz. cols. 1345–1346. ISBN 3-88309-072-7.
- (in German) Hubert Jedin: Kirchenhistoriker aus Schlesien in der Ferne. In: Ders.: Kirche des Glaubens – Kirche der Geschichte. Ausgewählte Aufsätze und Vorträge, Bd. I. Verlag Herder, Freiburg im Breisgau 1966, S. 75–89.
- (in German) Reiner Sörries: Josef Wilpert. (1857–1944). Ein Leben im Dienste der christlichen Archäologie. Bergstadtverlag Korn, Würzburg 1998, ISBN 3-87057-202-7.
