= Maurice Besnier =

French historian (1873–1933)

Maurice Besnier (29 September 1873, Paris – 4 March 1933, Caen) was a French historian, who specialised in ancient geography and topography.

Former member of the École française de Rome, he became the 34th professor of ancient history, epigraphy and archeology of the Faculté des Lettres de Caen. He was named as chair of ancient geography at the École pratique des hautes études in 1920, and in 1924 became a member of the Académie des Inscriptions et Belles-Lettres. He contributed to the Pauly-Wissowa and to the Dictionnaire des Antiquités.

== Selected writings ==
- with Paul Blanchet: Musées et collections archéologiques de l’Algérie et de la Tunisie. Collection Farges. Paris 1900
- L’Île Tibérine dans l’antiquité. Paris 1902
- De regione Paelignorum. Paris 1902
- Géographie ancienne du Maroc. Paris 1904
- Les catacombes de Rome. Rom 1909
- Histoire des fouilles de Vieux (Calvados). In: Mémoires de la Société nationale des Antiquaires de France. 69. Jahrgang, 7. Folge, Band 99 (1909), pp. 225–335
- Lexique de geographie ancienne. Paris 1914
- L’Empire Romain de l’avènement des Sévères au Concile de Nicée. Paris 1937

== Bibliography ==
- Ferdinand Brunot: Éloge funèbre de M. Maurice Besnier, correspondent français de l’Académie. In: Comptes rendus de l'Académie des inscriptions et belles-lettres. 1933, pp. 118–120 (Volltext).
- Marcel Durry: Revue des questions historiques. 118 (1934), p. 51 ff.
- Stefan Heid: Maurice Besnier. In Stefan Heid, Martin Dennert: Personenlexikon zur Christlichen Archäologie. Forscher und Persönlichkeiten vom 16. bis zum 21. Jahrhundert. Schnell & Steiner, Regensburg 2012, ISBN 978-3-7954-2620-0, Bd. 1, p. 174.
- Raymond Lantier: Maurice Besnier. In: Revue archéologique. 6. Folge, 1 (1933), pp. 237-239.
- David M. Robinson: Necrology Maurice Besnier. In: American Journal of Archaeology. vol. 38 (1934), p. 285.
