= Mühlmann =

Mühlmann or Muhlmann is a surname. Notable people with the surname include:

- Géraldine Muhlmann, French political scientist and political journalist
- Heiner Mühlmann (born 1938), German philosopher
- Horst Mühlmann (1940–1991), German footballer and American football player
- Ottogerd Mühlmann (1908–1987), German art historian
- Ringo Mühlmann (born 1975), German politician (AfD)
- Wilhelm Emil Mühlmann (1904–1988), German ethnologist
