= Felix Becker (art historian) =

German art historian (1864–1928)

Karl Günther Ernst Felix Becker (27 September 1864, Sondershausen - 23 October 1928, Leipzig) was a German art historian, best known today for the project Thieme-Becker.

== Life ==
He was the son of the glassmaker Johann Albert Adolph Becker (1811–1891) and Johanna Wilhelmine Christiane nee Kumst (1824–1888). He studied art history at Bonn University and Leipzig University, acted as assistant to August Schmarsow and gained his doctorate in 1897 with a thesis on Early Netherlandish painting. He travelled widely before settling in Leipzig as a private scholar - there he and Ulrich Thieme edited the first four volumes of the Allgemeinen Lexikons der bildenden Künstler von der Antike bis zur Gegenwart until he resigned in 1910 due to ill health.

== Works ==
=== Author ===
- Schriftquellen zur Geschichte der altniederländischen Malerei nach den Hauptmeistern chronologisch geordnet. Sellmann & Henne, Leipzig 1897, zugleich Dissertation, Universität Leipzig 1898
- Beschreibender Katalog der Gemäldesammlung. Herzoglich-Sachsen-Altenburgisches Museum. Pierer, Altenburg 1898; 2. Auflage unter dem Titel: Beschreibender Katalog der alten Originalgemälde. Herzoglich Sachsen-Altenburgisches Museum. Bonde, Altenburg 1915
- Spemanns goldenes Buch der Kunst. Spemann, Berlin [u. a.] 1901
- Gemäldegalerie Speck von Sternburg in Lützschena. Twietmeyer, Leipzig 1904
- Mittelalterliche Kunstwerke in der Sammlung der Deutschen Gesellschaft. Hiersemann, Leipzig 1920 (=Mittheilungen der Deutschen Gesellschaft zu Erforschung Vaterländischer Sprache und Alterthümer in Leipzig. Band 11,3)
- Die Sammlungen der Deutschen Gesellschaft. In: Beiträge zur Deutschen Bildungsgeschichte. Festschrift zur Zweihundertjahrfeier der Deutschen Gesellschaft in Leipzig 1727–1927. Leipzig 1927, S. 28–55

=== Editor ===
- Allgemeines Lexikon der bildenden Künstler von der Antike bis zur Gegenwart. Band 1–4, Engelmann (later Seemann), Leipzig 1907–10
- Handzeichnungen alter Meister in Privatsammlungen. 50 bisher nicht veröffentlichte Originalzeichnungen des 15. bis 18. Jahrhunderts. Tauchnitz, Leipzig 1922 (englisch als: Fifty Drawings by old masters in private collections. Tauchnitz, Leipzig 1922)
- Handzeichnungen holländischer Meister aus der Sammlung Dr. C. Hofstede de Groot im Haag. 50 ausgewählte Zeichnungen Rembrandts, seines Kreises und seiner Zeit in Farbenlichtdruck. Tauchnitz, Leipzig 1922; published in English as Drawings by Dutch Masters. Fifty selected drawings by Rembrandt, his circle, and contemporary artists. Tauchnitz, Leipzig 1923; 2. Band als Handzeichnungen holländischer Meister aus der Sammlung Dr. C. Hofstede de Groot im Haag. Neue Folge. 40 ausgewählte Zeichnungen Rembrandts, seines Kreises und seiner Zeit. Tauchnitz, Leipzig 1923

=== Revisions ===
- Die Renaissance im Norden und die Kunst des 17. und 18. Jahrhunderts (=Anton Heinrich Springer: Handbuch der Kunstgeschichte. Band 4). 8. Auflage, Seemann, Leipzig 1909
- Heinrich Bergner's Grundriß der Kunstgeschichte. 4. Auflage, Kröner, Leipzig 1923

== Bibliography ==
- Gerhard Lüdtke (ed.): Kürschners Deutscher Gelehrten-Kalender 1928/29. 3. Ausgabe. Gruyter, Berlin und Leipzig 1928, Sp. 108
- Hermann Christern (ed.): Deutsches Biographisches Jahrbuch. Band 10. Das Jahr 1928. Deutsche Verlagsanstalt, Stuttgart und Berlin 1931, S. 318
- Werner Teupser (1953). "Becker, Felix". Neue Deutsche Biographie (in German). Vol. 1. Berlin: Duncker & Humblot. pp. 719–720. (full text online).
