= Heinrich Bergner =

Heinrich Bergner (13 July 1865, Gumperda - 29 December 1918, Heilingen) was a German art historian and Protestant pastor.

== Life ==
He studied theology in Jena, Tübingen and Berlin and graduated from Jena in 1890. He was a pastor in Pfarrktzlar from 1891, Nischwitz from 1901 and Heilingen in Saxony-Anhalt from 1914.

He was a major contributor and editor for the Historische Kommission für die Provinz Sachsen und Anhalt's series Beschreibenden Darstellung der älteren Bau- und Kunstdenkmäler - as part of it he published Kreis Ziegenrück und Schleusingen (1901), Kreis Grafschaft Wernigerode (1913), Kreis Wanzleben (1912), Kreis Wolmirstedt (1911), Kreis Liebenwerda (1910), Kreis Querfurt (1909) and die Stadt Naumburg (1903).

== Selected works ==
- Der gute Hirt in der altchristlichen Kunst, Berlin 1890 (= Dissertation Jena).
- Naumburg und Merseburg, Leipzig 1926.
- Zur Glockenkunde Thüringens, 1896.
- Handbuch der bürgerlichen Kunstaltertümer in Deutschland, 2 Bände, E.A.Seemann Leipzig 1906, überarb. Nachdruck Unikum 2013.
- Handbuch der kirchlichen Kunstaltertümer in Deutschland, 1905.
- Archäologischer Katechismus. Kurzer Unterricht in der kirchlichen Kunstarchäologie des deutschen Mittelalters, 1898.
- Grundriss der Kunstgeschichte, Leipzig 1919.
- Geschichte der Stadt Kahla, 1. Band: Urkunden, 1899.
- Rome in the Middle Ages
- Baroque Rome 1914

== Bibliography ==
- Heinrich Bergner. In: Stefan Heid, Martin Dennert (ed.): Personenlexikon zur Christlichen Archäologie. Forscher und Persönlichkeiten vom 16. bis zum 21. Jahrhundert. Schnell & Steiner, Regensburg 2012, ISBN 978-3-7954-2620-0, Bd. 1, S. 162.
- Ottogerd Mühlmann: Dr. Heinrich Bergner. Pfarrer und Kunsthistoriker, in: Willy Quandt (Bearb.): Bedeutende Männer aus Thüringer Pfarrhäusern. Gabe der Thüringer Kirche an das Thüringer Volk, Evangelische Verlagsanstalt publisher Berlin 1957, pp. 112–120.
