= Anton de Waal =

German theologian, church historian, Christian archeologist (1837–1917)

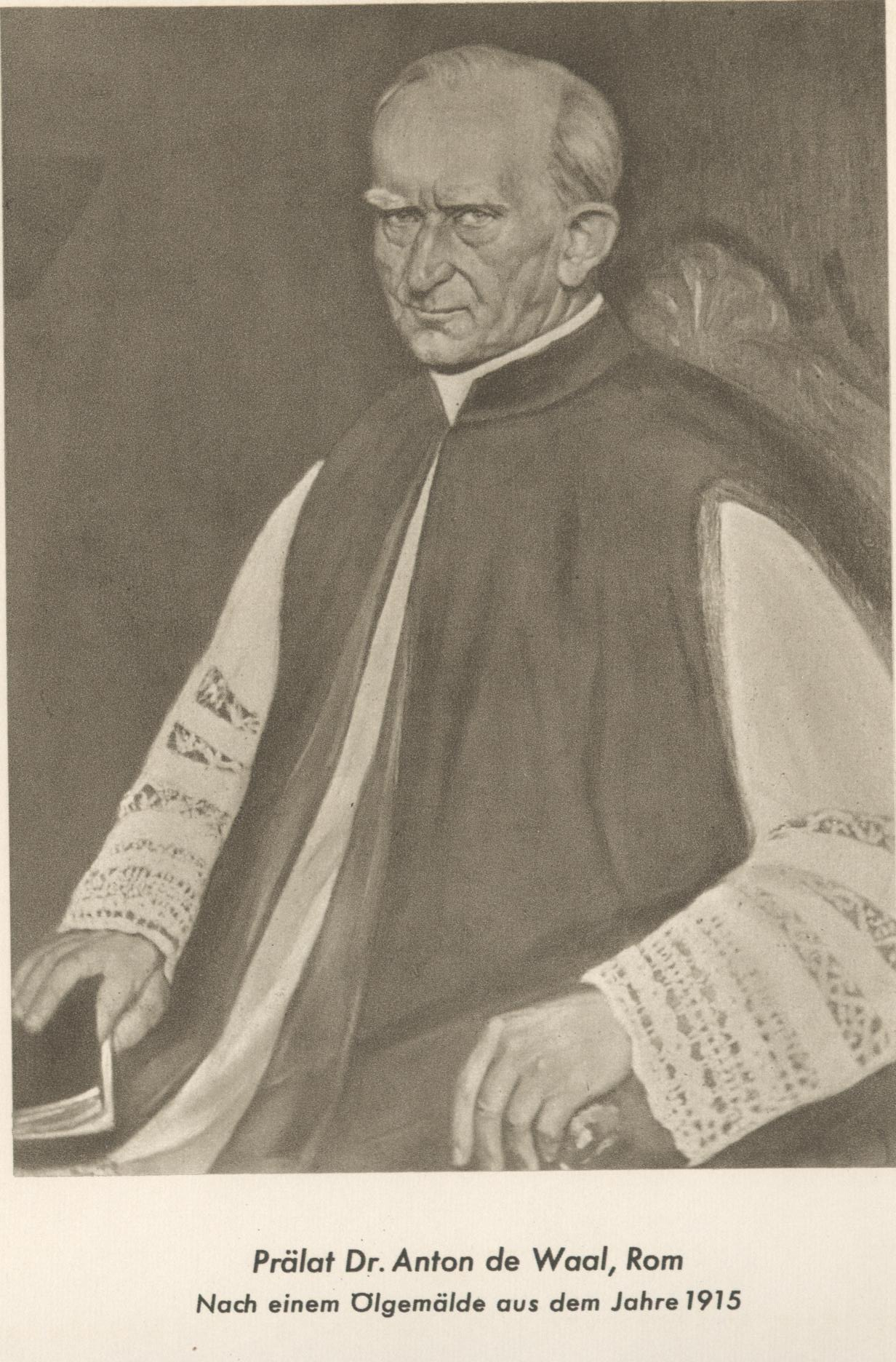
- Portrait of Monsignor Anton de Waal (1915)
- Born: May 5, 1837; Emmerich am Rhein, Province of Jülich-Cleves-Berg, Kingdom of Prussia
- Died: February 23, 1917 (aged 79); Rome, Kingdom of Italy
- Known for: Christian archeology in Rome
- Awards: Pro Ecclesia et Pontifice Order of the Crown (Prussia), Imperial Austrian Franz Joseph Order
- Scientific career
- Fields: Christian archeology, church history, Roman Catholic theology,
- Institutions: Collegio Teutonico

Anton Joseph Johann Maria de Waal (5 May 1837 – 23 February 1917) was a German Christian archeologist and Roman Catholic church historian. He established the Collegio Teutonico del Campo Santo and carried out numerous archeological excavations in Rome.

== Life ==
De Waal was born in Emmerich am Rhein, then in the Province of Jülich-Cleves-Berg in the Kingdom of Prussia, on 5 May 1837, As a young man, he studied theology at the seminary in Münster. He was ordained to the priesthood on 11 October 1862 by Bishop Johann Georg Müller of the Diocese of Münster. He then taught at the Collegium Augustinianum Gaesdonck, a boarding school close to the city of Goch.

On 19 July 1868, De Waal became chaplain of the German National church of Santa Maria dell'Anima in Rome. He received his Doctorate in Theology on 19 February 1869. During the siege and conquest of Rome by army of the Kingdom of Italy in 1870, he volunteered as chaplain of the Papal troops. He became Vice-Rector in 1872 and then Rector in 1873 of the Collegio Teutonico in the Vatican. In 1875, he was appointed secret chamberlain of Pope Pius IX. On 23 June 1896 Anton de Waal became prelate to the Pontifical House and on 30 July 1900 Protonotary apostolic. He was appointed on 2 November 1904 Commissioner of the pastoral care of all Germans in Italy.

de Waall was the recipient of the Pontifical Order of Merit "Pro Ecclesia et Pontifice" in gold and several chivalric orders: Order of the Crown (Prussia) 2d class, Order of the Red Eagle (Prussia) 2d class, Bavarian Order of Merit of St. Michael 2d class, Commander's Cross Class I of the Albert Order of Saxony and Commander's Cross and Commander's star of the Imperial Austrian Franz Joseph Order.

He died in Rome on 23 February 1917 and was buried in the Teutonic Cemetery, reserved to German nationals serving the Catholic Church in Rome, located next to the Church of Santa Maria della Pietà in Camposanto dei Teutonici.

== Work ==
He devoted his scientific interest principally to Christian archaeology, encouraged by Giovanni Battista de Rossi. In 1892-93 and again in 1915, de Waal carried out excavations at San Sebastiano Catacombs on the Via Appia.

In 1876 de Waal obtained from Pope Pius IX permission to change the statutes of "Erzbruderschaft zur schmerzhaften Muttergottes der Deutschen und Flamen" (English: Confraternity of Our Lady of Sorrows of the German and Flemish) to take care of the church of Santa Maria della Pietà in Camposanto dei Teutonici and the adjoining cemetery. He founded, in the confraternity house, the Collegio Teutonico del Campo Santo and constituted a library specialised in Christian archeology for which he put together an important collection of early Christian art.

In 1887 he founded, in cooperation with the Gorres-Gesellschaft, the journal "Römische Quartalschrift für christliche Altertumskunde und Kirchengeschichte" (English: Roman quarterly magazine for Christian archeology and history of the Church) and became in 1901 co-editor with Carl Anton Baumstark of the journal "Oriens Christianus".

In addition to his academic and pastoral work, de Waal wrote biographies in German of popes of his day (Leo XIII, Pius X and Benedict XV) as well as historical narratives and amateur theater pieces.

== Gallery ==
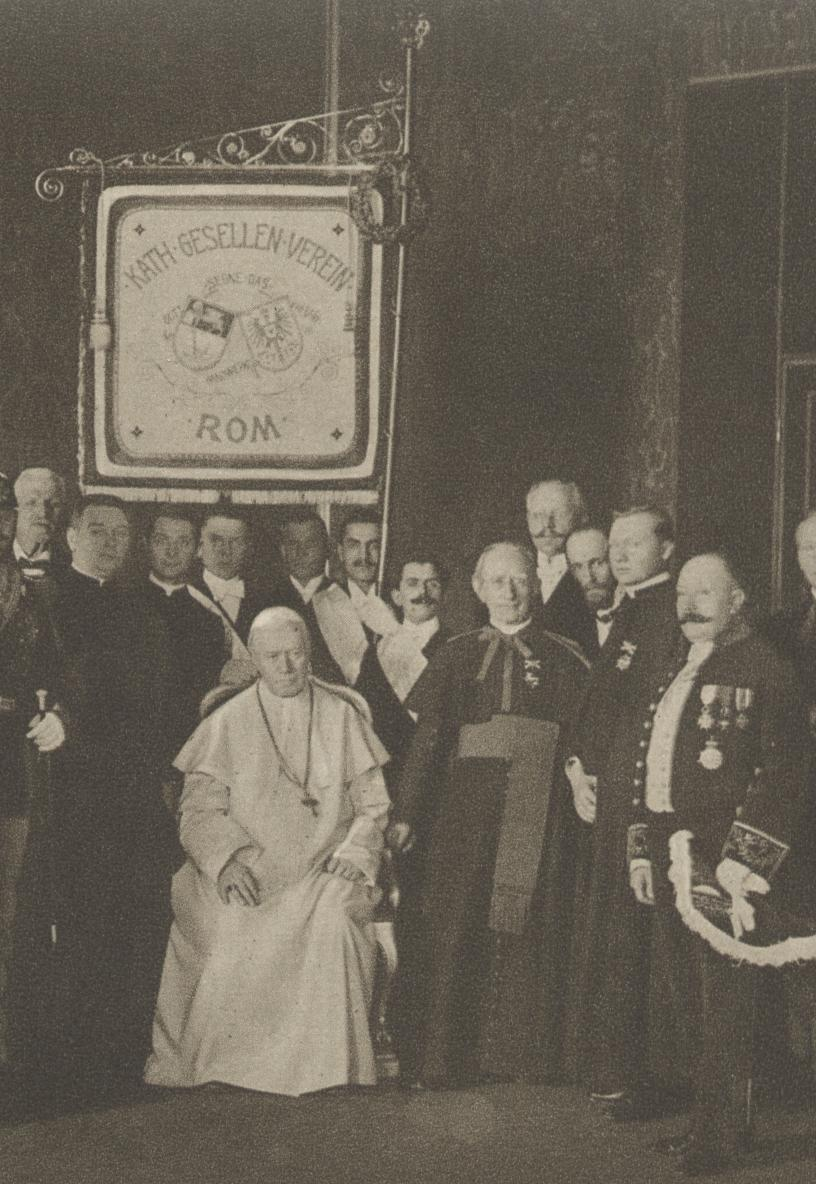
Monsignor Anton de Waal (center, next to the pope), in audience to Pope Pius X in 1913 with the Deutschen Gesellenverein Rom.

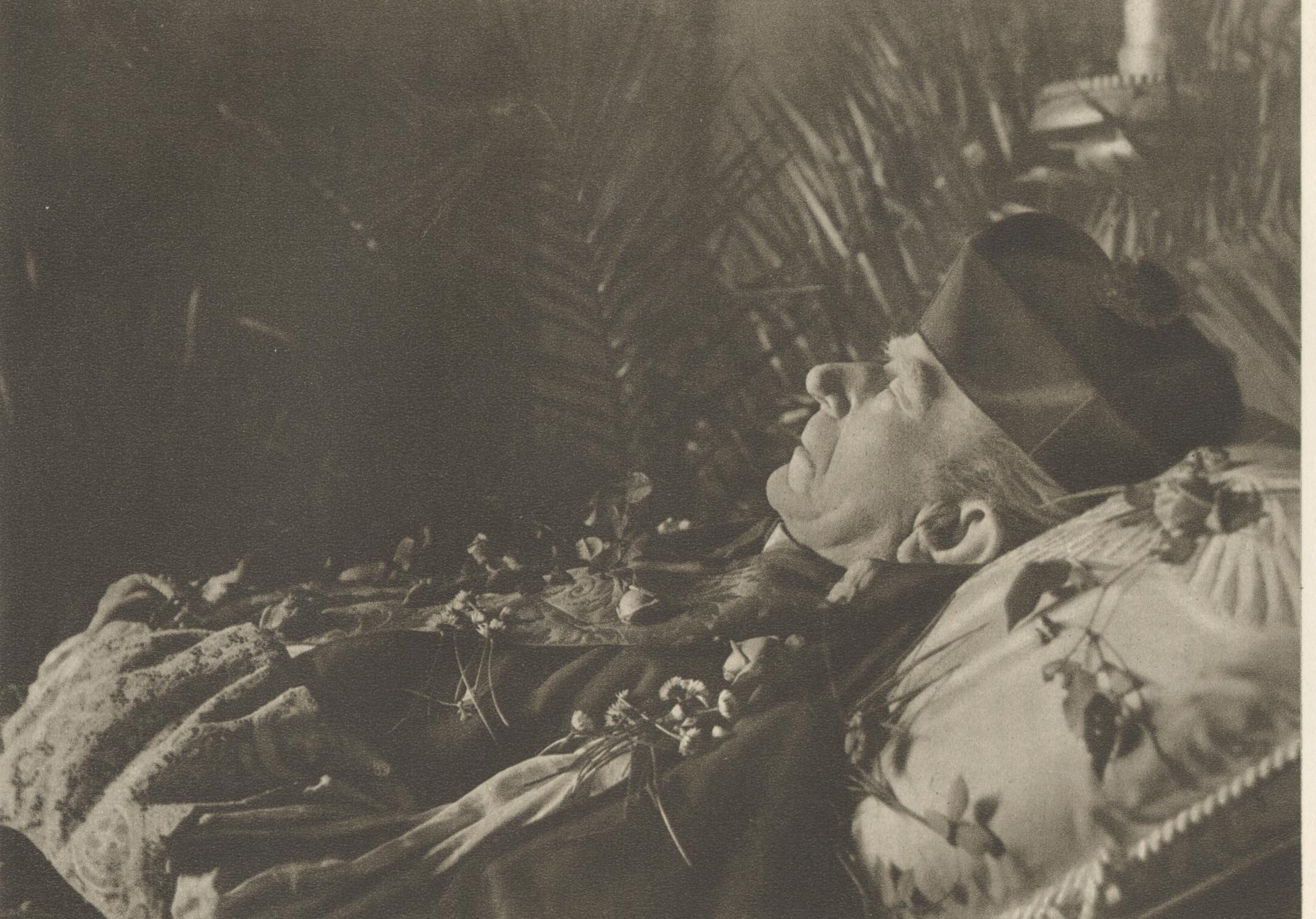
Anton de Waal on his funeral bier, 24 February 1917.

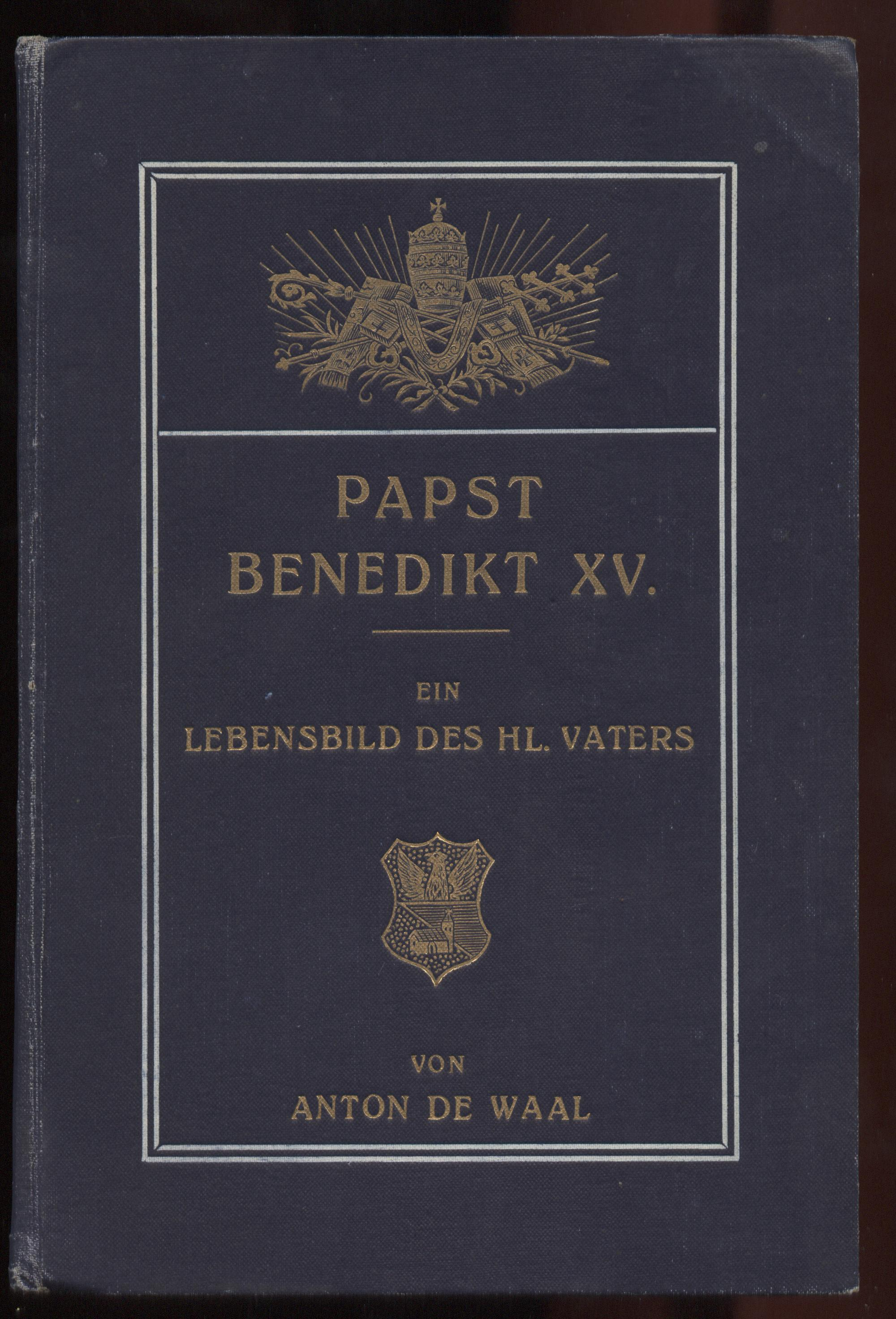
Cover of De Waal's biography of Pope Benedict XV, 1915

== List of works ==
- Des Apostelfürsten Petrus glorreiche Ruhestätte. Festschrift zum Papstjubiläum Pius IX. (1871)
- Die Streiter des heiligen Vaters. Episode aus der jüngsten Geschichte der Eroberung Roms. Schauspiel in 3 Aufzügen. (1871)
- Meister Faustgerecht. Schauspiel in 3 Aufzügen. (1872)
- Erinnerungen an Rom, zunächst den deutschen Pilgern zu der 30. Jubelfeier unseres heil. Vaters Pius IX. gewidmet. (1876)
- Erinnerung an die Romfahrt zum Bischofs-Jubiläum unseres heiligen Vaters Pius IX. am 17. Mai 1877. (1877)
- Unseres heiligen Vaters Papst Leo XIII. Leben. (1878)
- Die Nationalstiftungen des deutschen Volkes in Rom. (1880)
- Valeria oder der Triumphzug aus den Katakomben (1884)
- Die Katakomben des heiligen Callistus. (1886)
- Der Rompilger. Wegweiser zu den wichtigsten Heiligthümern und Sehenswürdigkeiten der ewigen Stadt. (1888)
- Tim, der Negerknabe. Schauspiel in 3 Aufzügen. Für Gesellenvereine und ähnl. Kreise. (1889)
- Katakomben-Bilder. 6 Erzählungen aus den ersten Jahrhunderten der römischen Kirche. (1891)
- Die Apostelgruft ad Catacumbas an der Via Appia. Eine historisch-archäologische Untersuchung auf Grund der neuesten Ausgrabungen. (1894)
- 25 Jahre in Rom von 1870-1895. Ein Bild des katholischen Lebens in der deutschen Colonie. (1895)
- Der Campo Santo der Deutschen zu Rom. Geschichte der nationalen Stiftung zum 1100jährigen Jubiläum ihrer Gründung durch Karl den Großen. (1896)
- Papst Pius X. Ein Lebensbild des hl. Vaters. Mit einem Rückblick auf die letzten Tage Leos XIII. (1903)
- Roma Sacra. Die ewige Stadt in ihren christlichen Denkmälern und Erinnerungen alter und neuer Zeit. (1905)
- Konstantin des Großen Kirchenbauten in Rom. (1913)
- Der neue Papst. Unser Hl. Vater Benedikt XV. (1915)
