= Joseph Anton Koch =

Austrian painter (1768–1839)

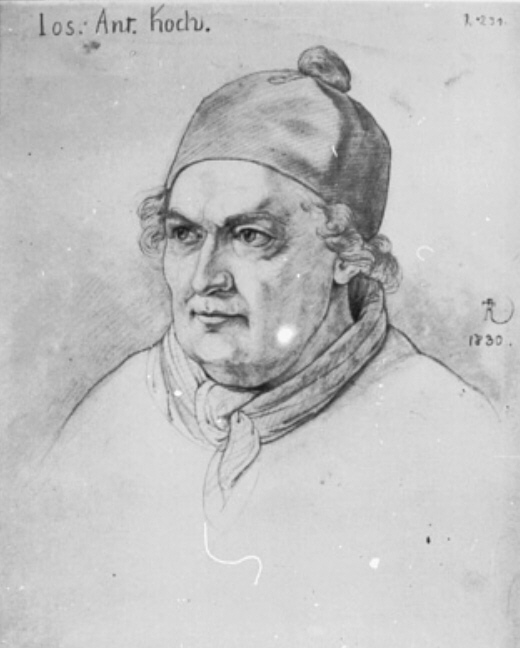
- Drawing by Theodor Rehbenitz, 1830
- Born: 27 July 1768; Elbigenalp, Tyrol, Austria
- Died: 12 January 1839 (aged 70); Rome, Italy
- Resting place: Teutonic Cemetery

Joseph Anton Koch (27 July 1768 – 12 January 1839) was an Austrian painter of Neoclassicism and later the German Romantic movement.

== Biography ==
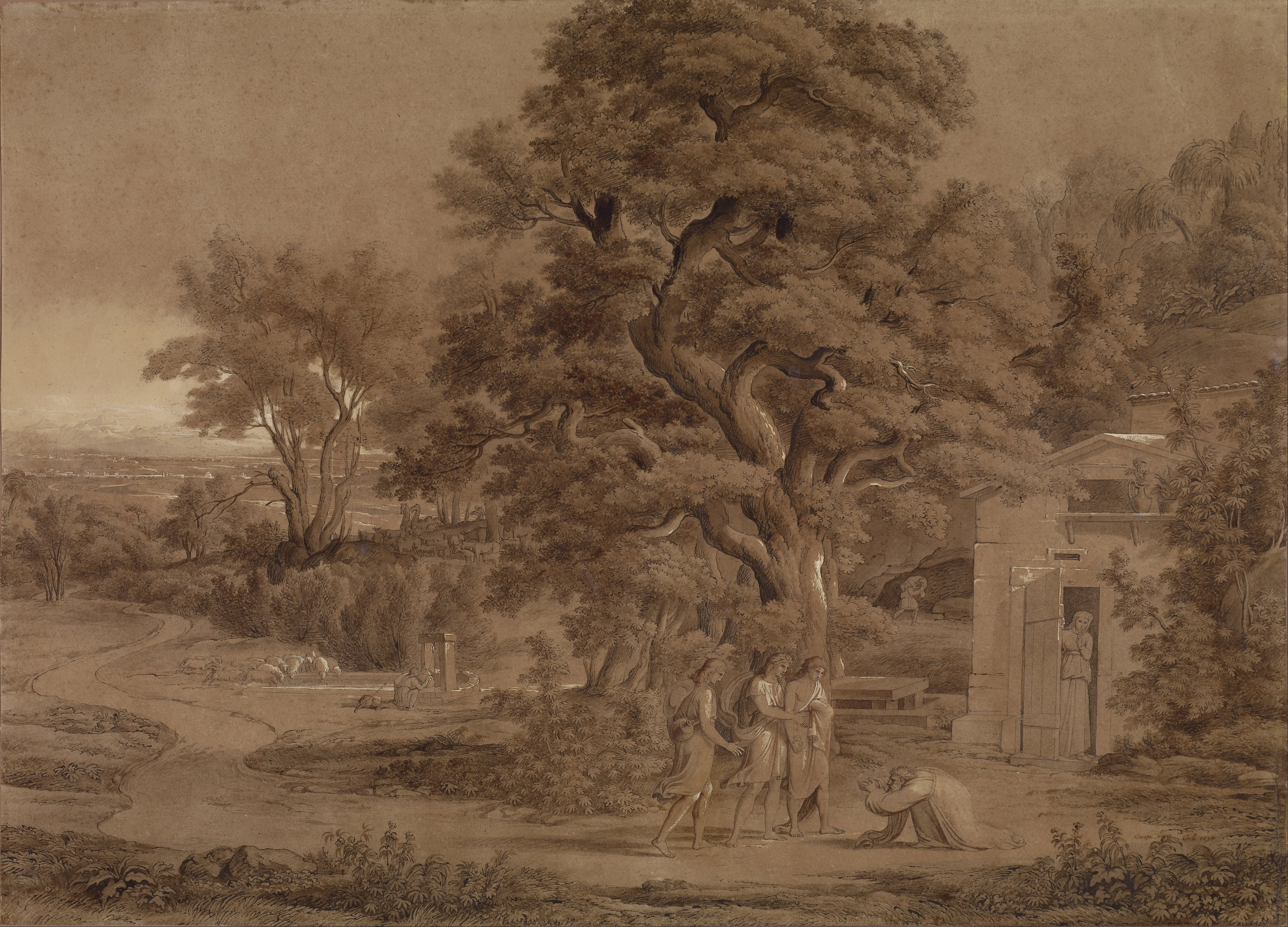
Landscape with Abraham and the Three Angels in the Valley of Mambre

The Tyrolese painter was born in Elbigenalp. Early in his life he was tending cattle. Through the recommendation of Bishop Umgelder (1785), he received academic training in the Karlsschule Stuttgart, a strict military academy. In 1791, he ran away, and traveled through France and Switzerland. He arrived in Rome in 1795. Koch was close to the painter Asmus Jacob Carstens and carried on Carstens' "heroic" art, at first in a literal manner. He etched the pages of Carstens' Les Argonautes, selon Pindar, Orphée et Apollonius de Rhode (Rome, 1799).

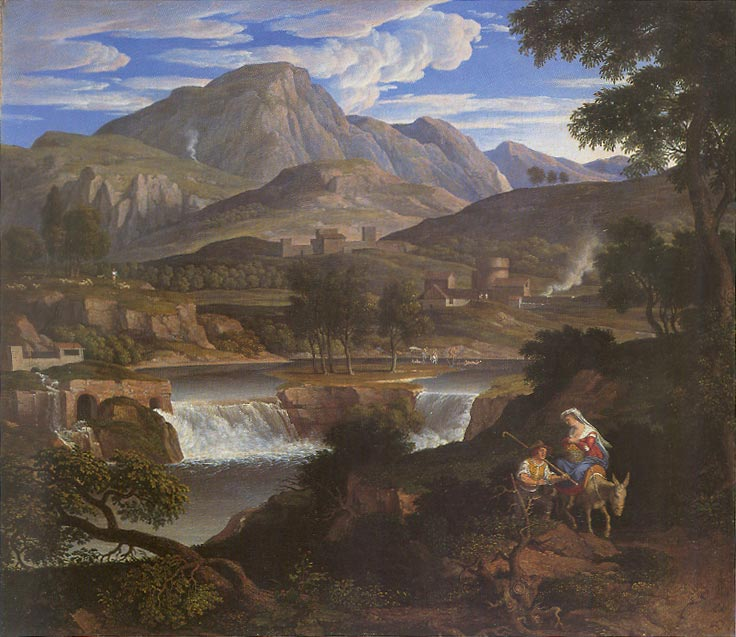
Waterfalls at Subiaco (1812–1813)

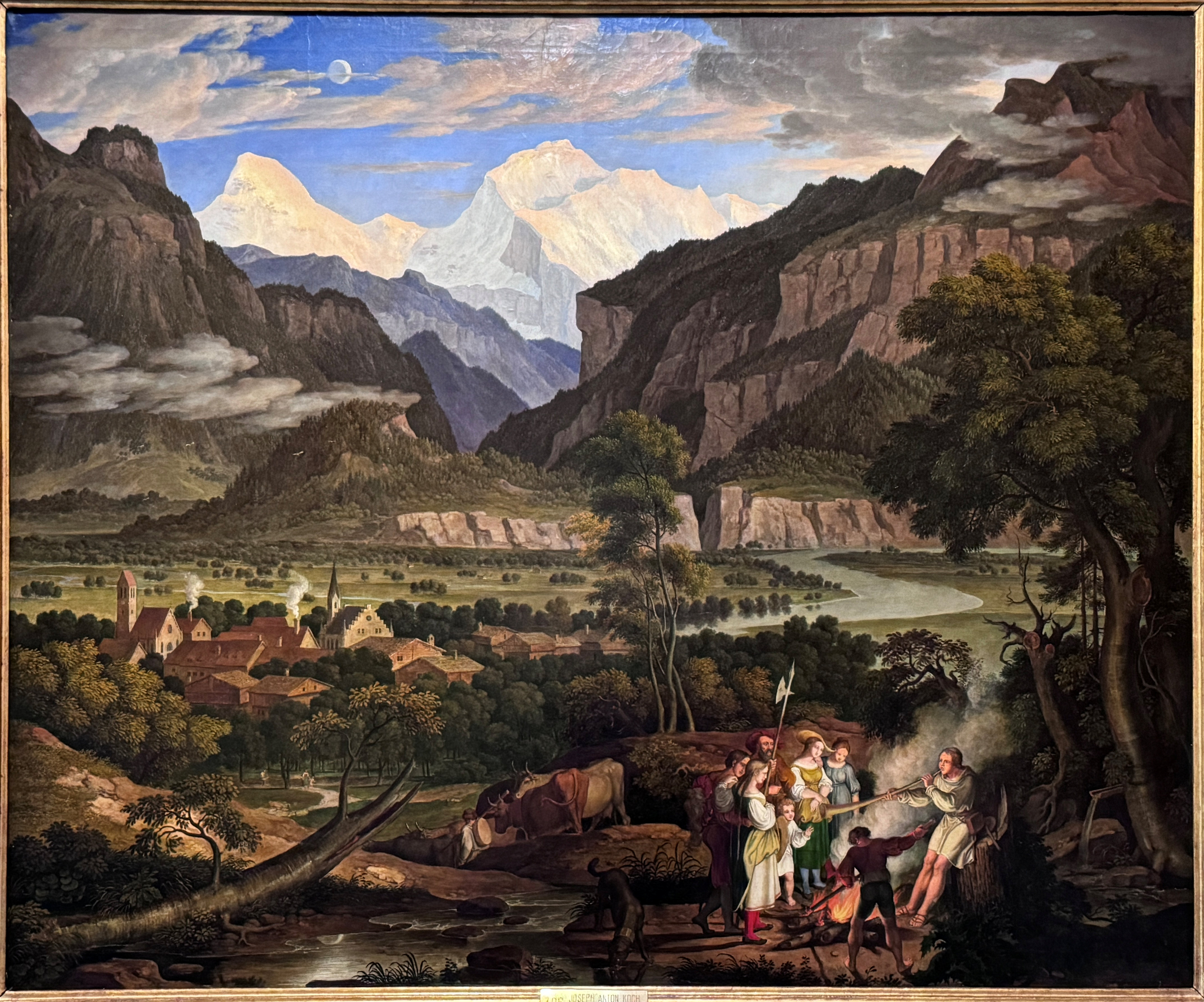
Aare river landscape with Monk and Virgin mountains and the Unterssen village, 1813, Anhaltische Gemäldegalerie Dessau

After 1800, Koch developed as a landscape painter. In Rome, he espoused a new type of "heroic" landscape, revising the classical compositions of Poussin and Lorrain with a more rugged, mountainous scenery. In 1812, forced through inadequate income from his work, or in protest of the French invasion, he went to Vienna, where he worked prolifically. He stayed in Vienna until 1815. During this period, he incorporated more non-classical themes in his work. In Vienna, he was influenced by Friedrich Schlegel and enthusiasts of old German art. In response, his style became harsher.

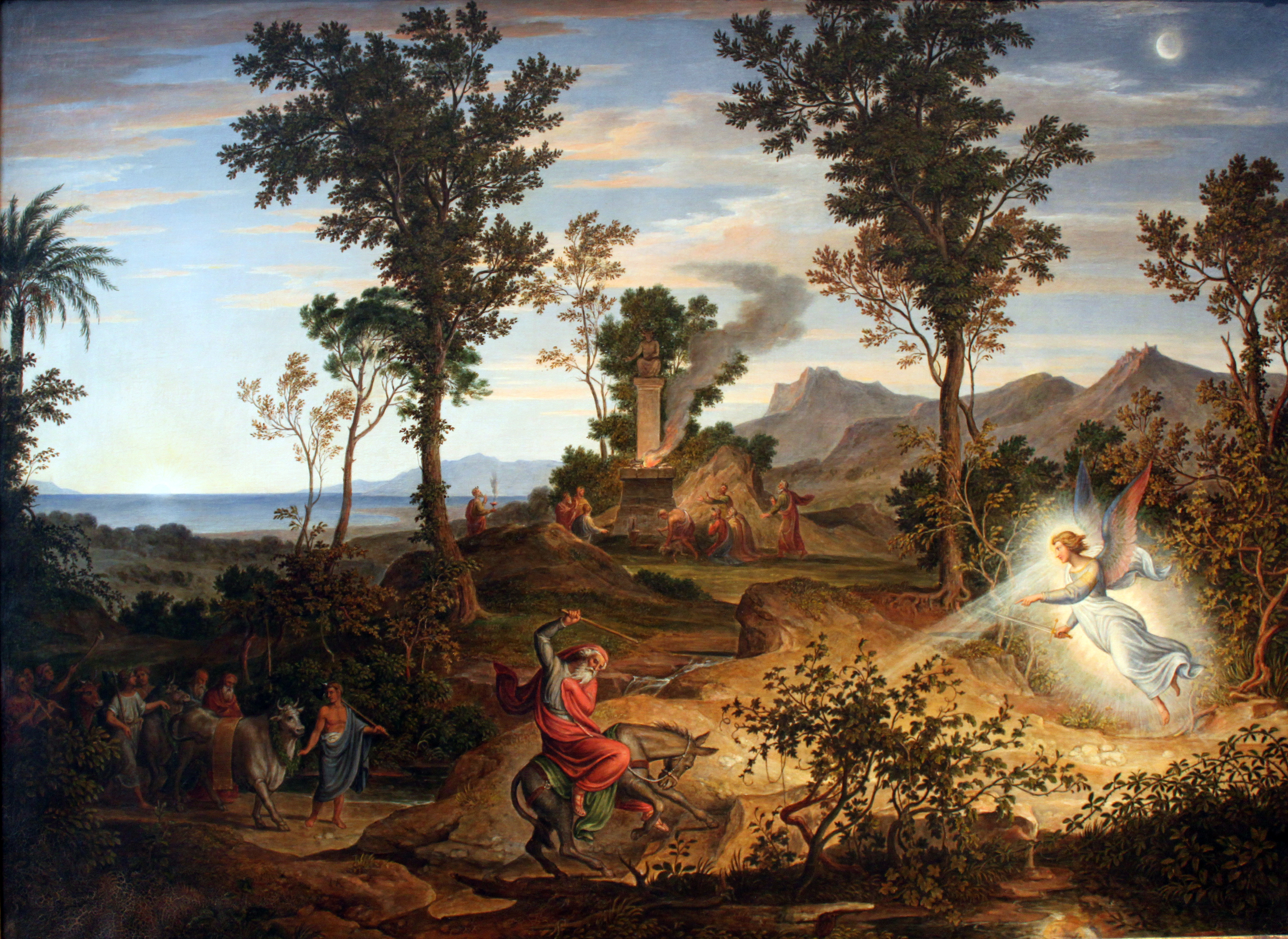
Landscape with Bileam, 1834

Koch returned to Rome, and became a conspicuous figure in the German artists' colony there. He painted, among other works, the four frescoes in the Dante Room of the Villa Massimi (1824–1829). His presence and personality had considerable influence among the younger generation in the art life of Rome, and his new approach had a wide influence on German landscape painters who visited Rome.

He wrote Moderne Kunstchronik oder die rumfordische Suppe gekocht und geschrieben von J. A. Koch (Stuttgart, 1834) which was directed humorously against unjustifiable criticism and false connoisseurship.

Koch's last years were spent in great poverty. He died in Rome, where he was buried in the Teutonic Cemetery, located next to St. Peter's Basilica within Vatican City.

== Works ==
- Landscape with Noah, ca. 1803 – oil on canvas [86 × 116 cm] (Städel Museum, Frankfurt)
- Schmadribach Falls in the Lauterbach Valley, 1811
- Noah's Sacrifice, 1813
- Grimsel Pass, 1813
- View in the Sabine Mountains, 1813
- Monastery of San Francesco di Civitella, 1814
- Landscape with Ruth and Boaz, ca. 1823/25 – oil on canvas
- Grindelwald Glacier in the Alps, 1823, National Museum in Wrocław
- View of Nauplia, 1830
- View Near Subiaco
- Macbeth and the Witches

He etched 20 Italian landscapes and a large sheet representing The Oath of the French at Millesimo; 14 pages after Dante, adding later another 30 pages (published Vicenza, 1904), and 36 pages after Ossian. He contributed American landscape scenes to the works of Alexander von Humboldt (1805).

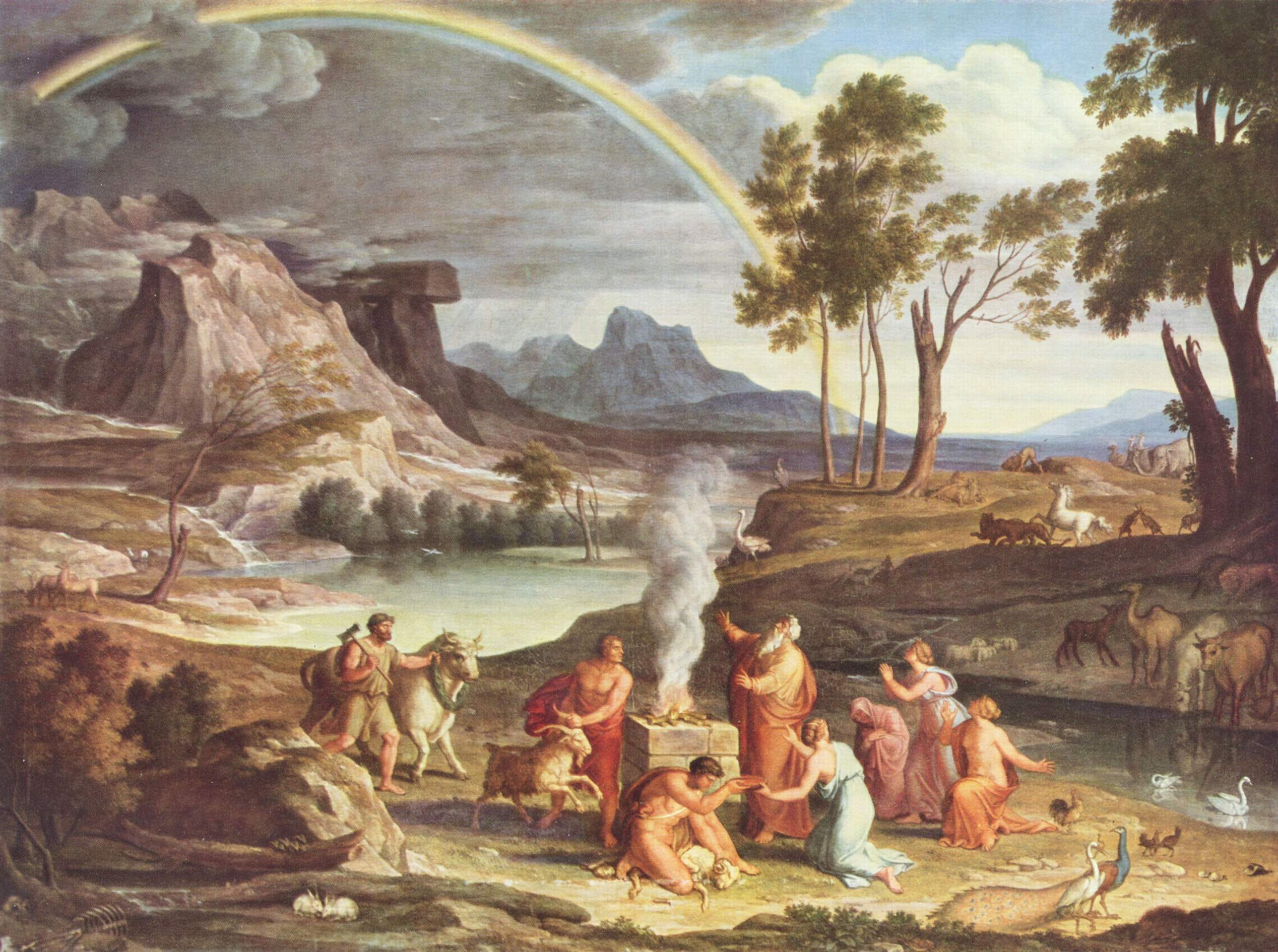
Landscape with Noah, c. 1803

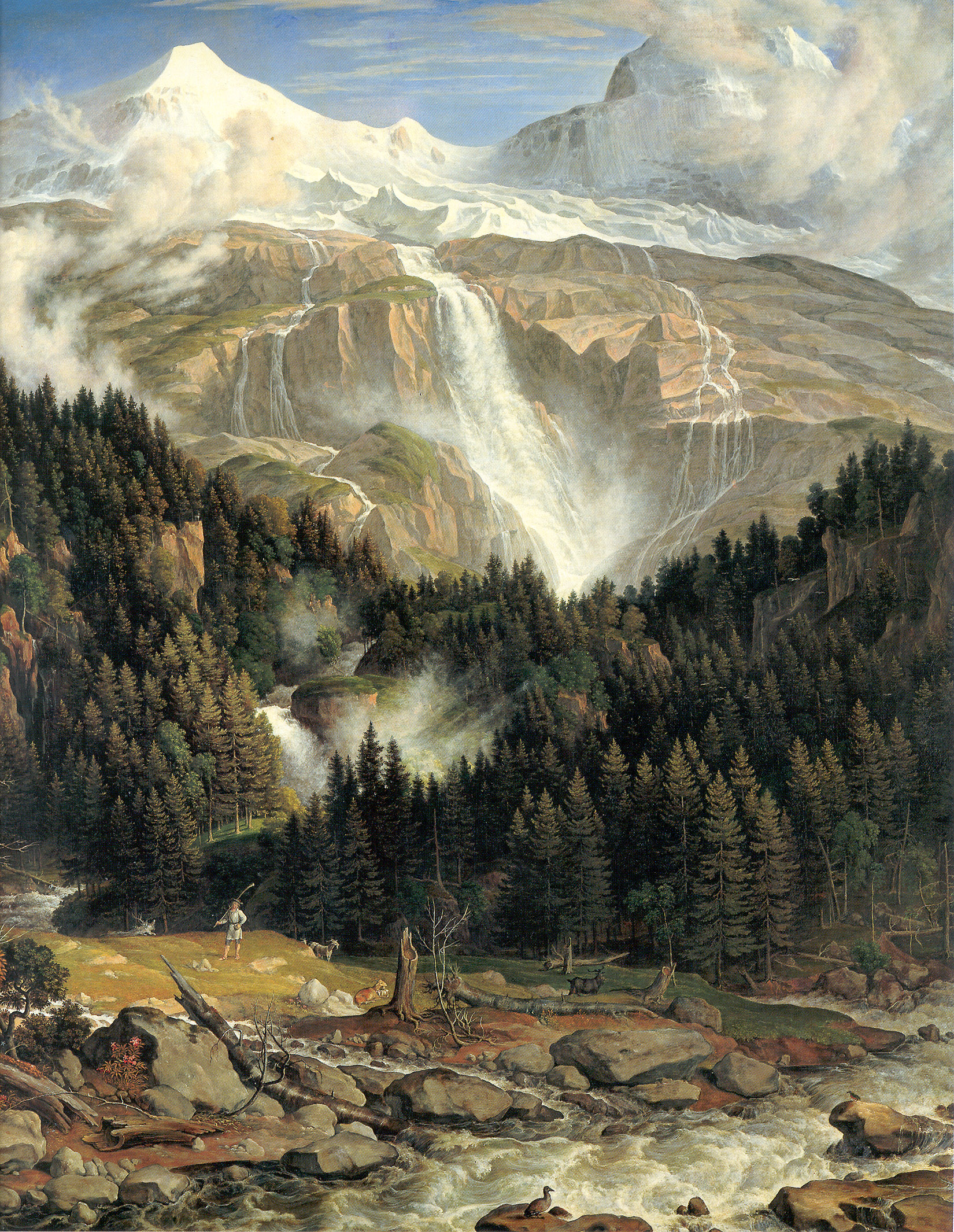
Der Schmadribachfall, 1821

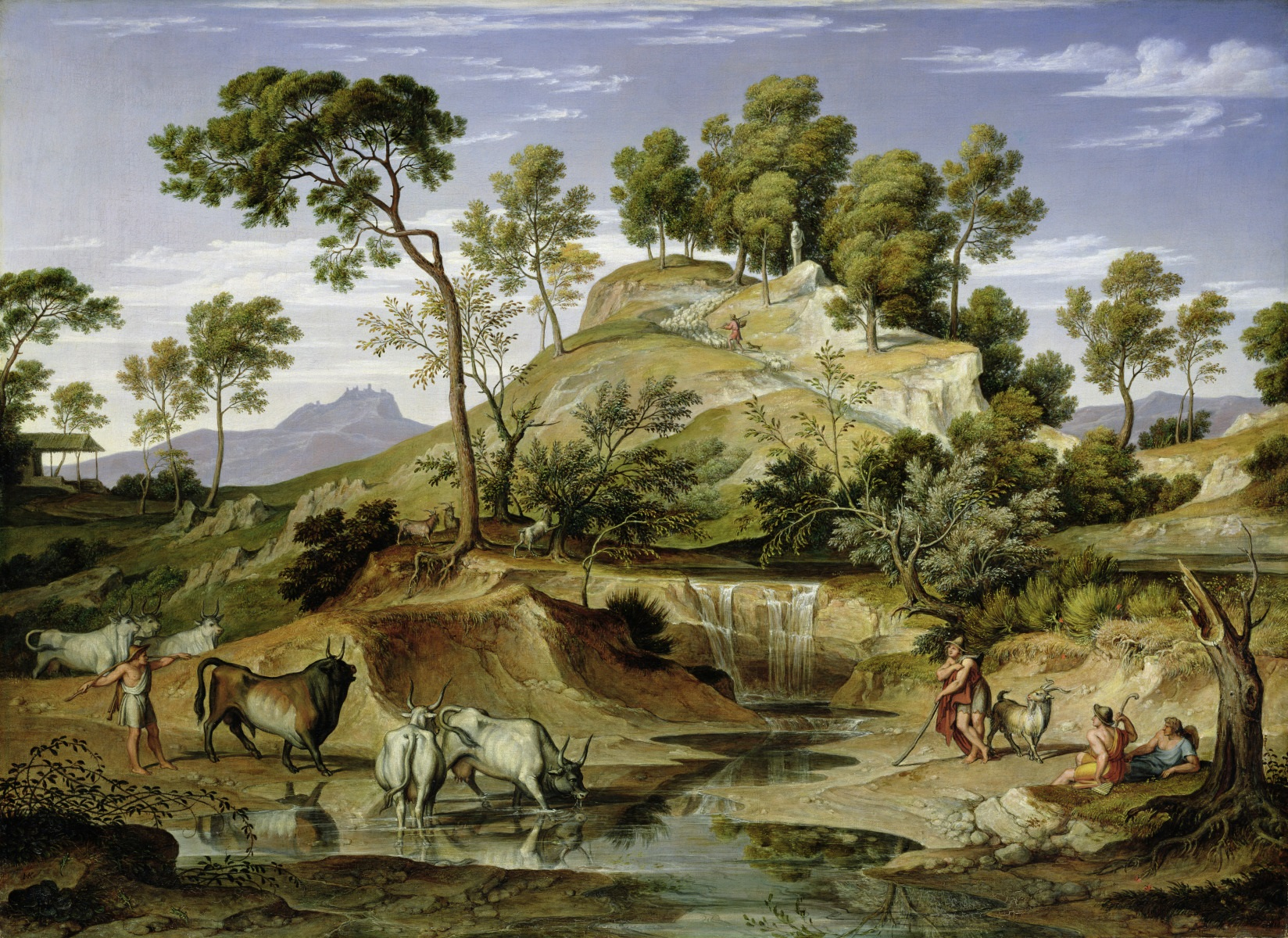
Landscape with Shepherds and Cows and at the Spring

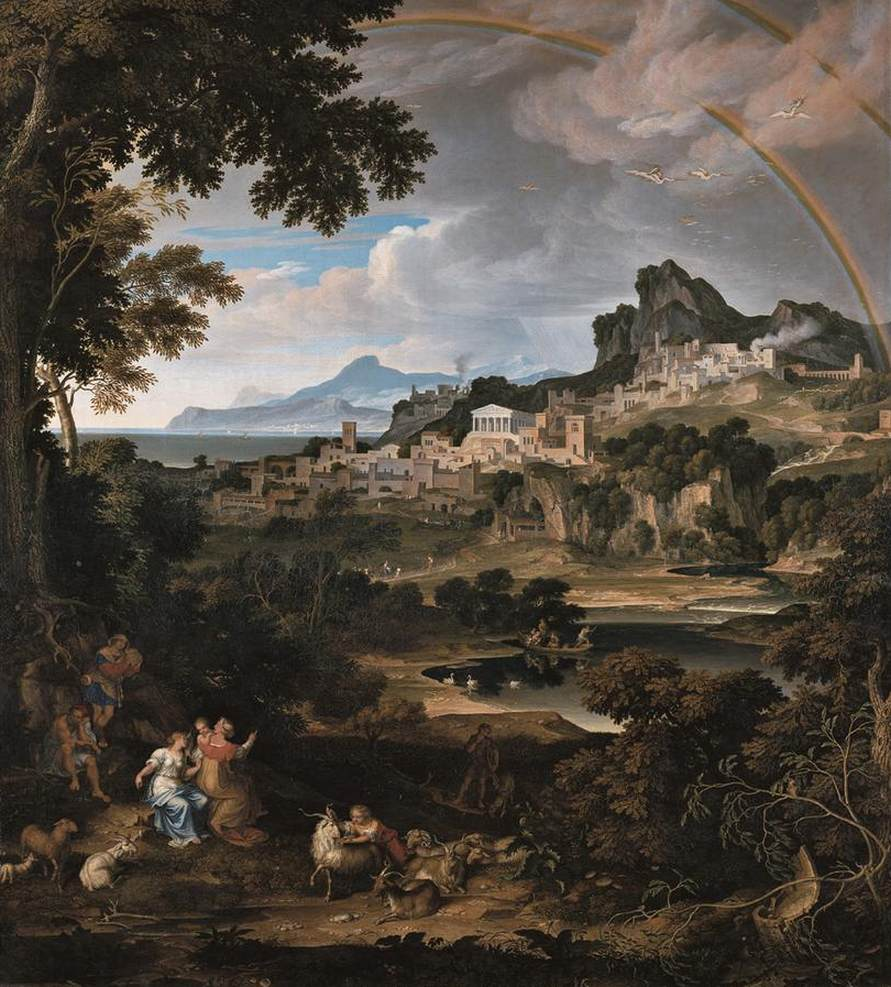
Heroic Landscape with a Rainbow (1805).

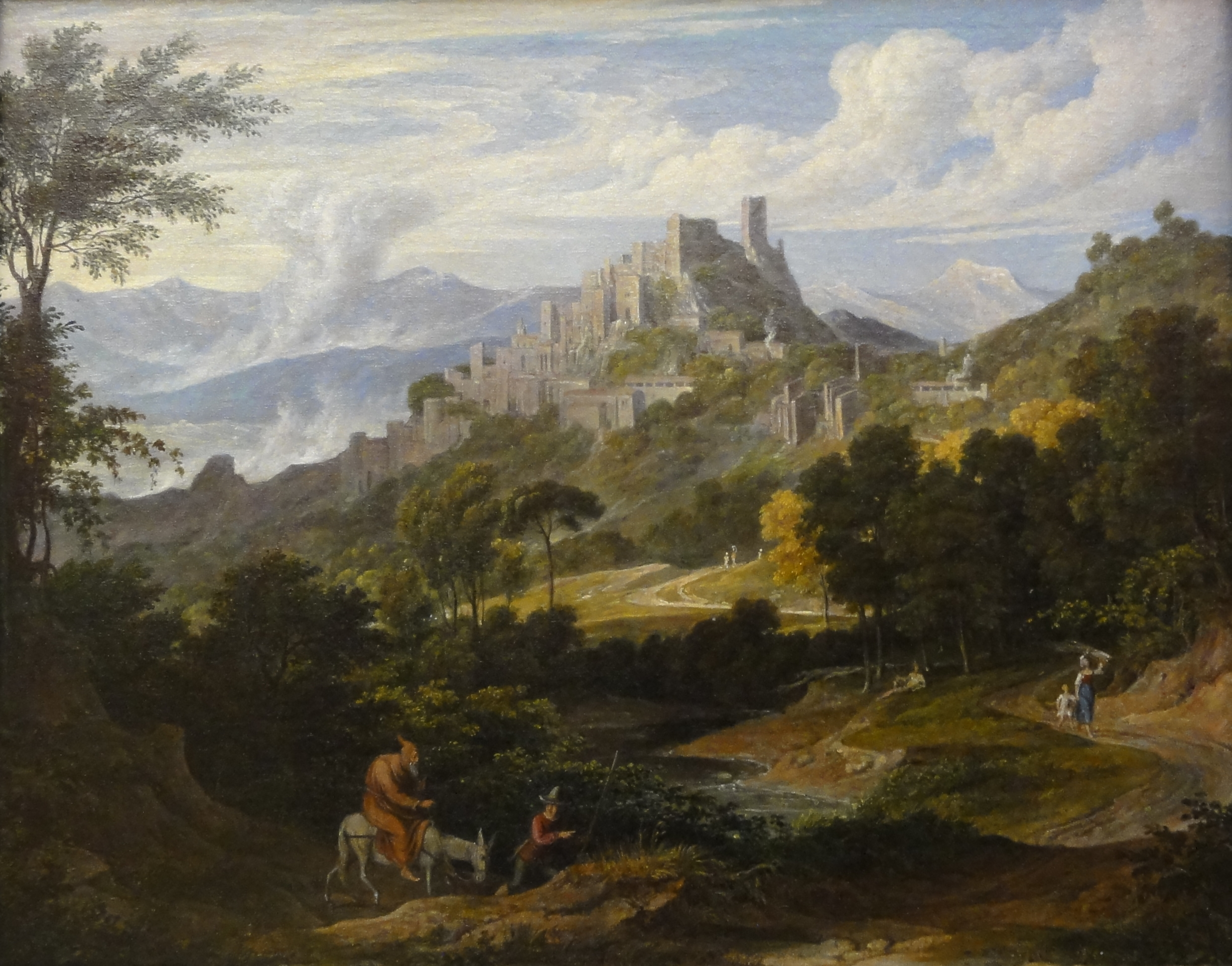
Landschaft bei Olevano mit reitendem Mönch, (1830)

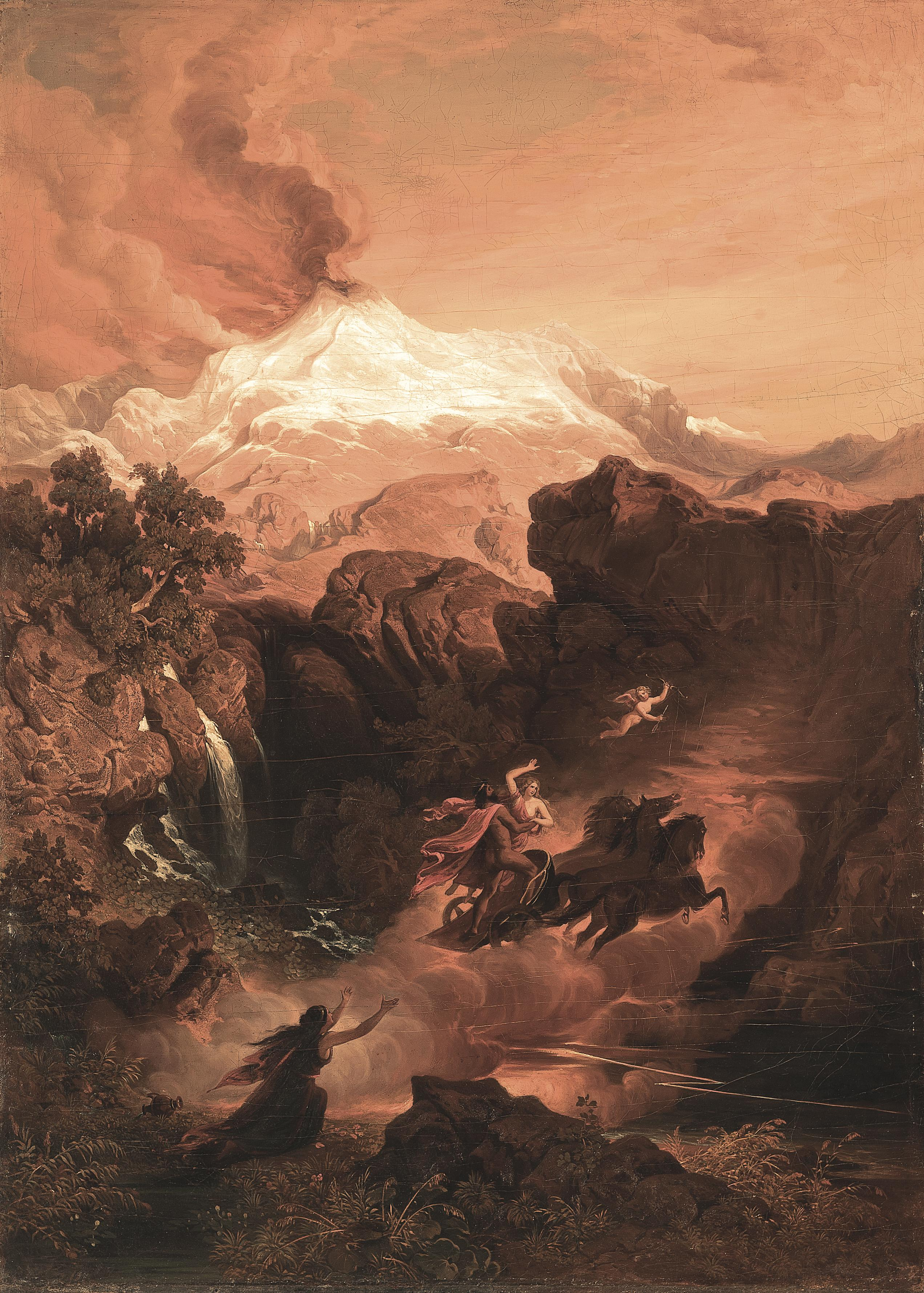
Raub von Proserpina
