= Collegio Teutonico =

German Pontifical College in Rome

Coordinates: 41°54′05″N 12°27′16″E

Collegio Teutonico del Campo Santo
- Pontificio Collegio Teutonico Santa Maria in Campo Santo
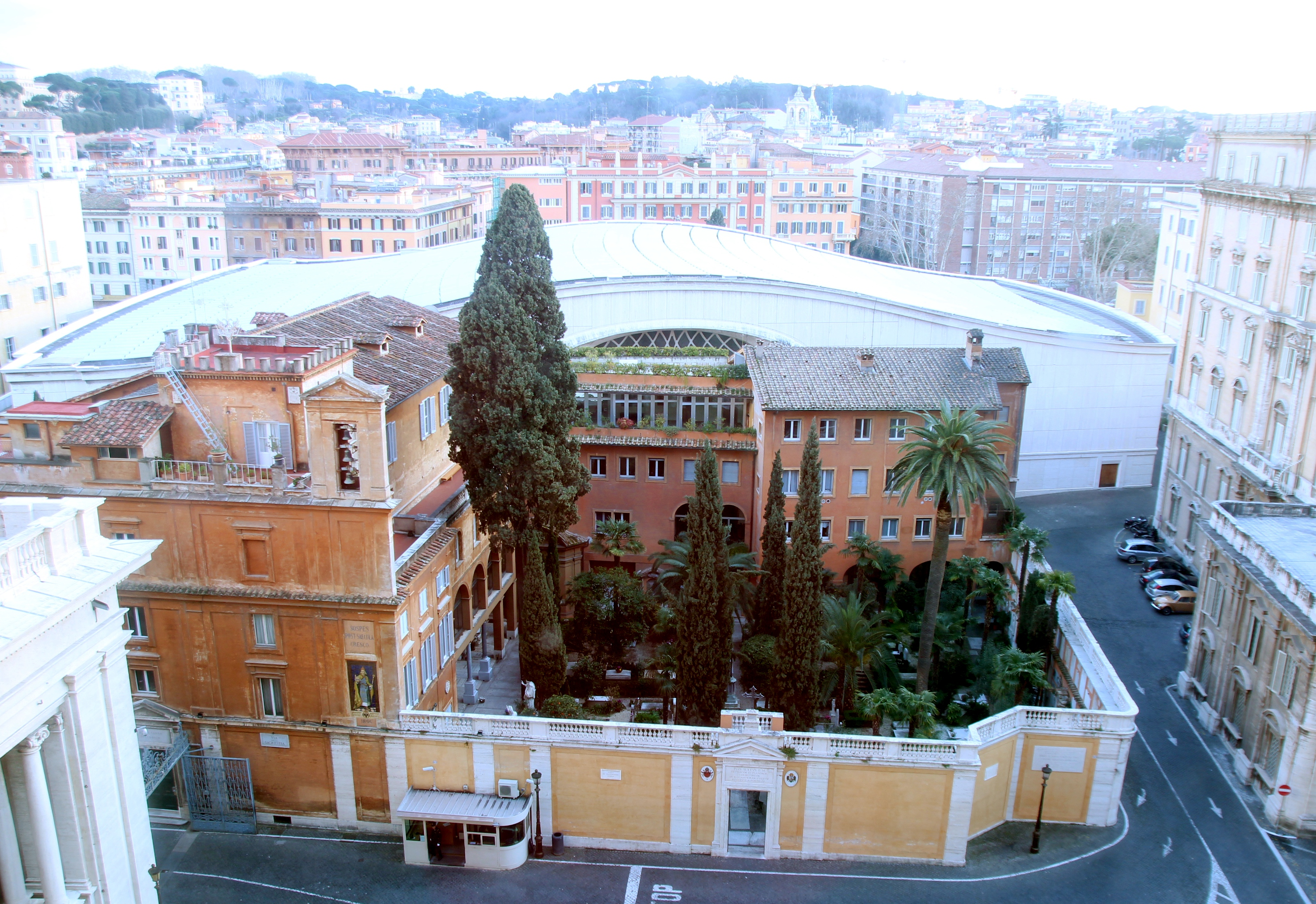
- Type: Pontifical college
- Established: 1876
- Location: Vatican City

The Collegio Teutonico (German College), historically often referred to by its Latin name Collegium Germanicum, is one of the Pontifical Colleges of Rome. The German College is the Pontifical College established for future ecclesiastics of German nationality. It is divided into two separate colleges: the Pontificio Collegio Teutonico di S. Maria dell’ Anima and the Collegio Teutonico del Campo Santo.

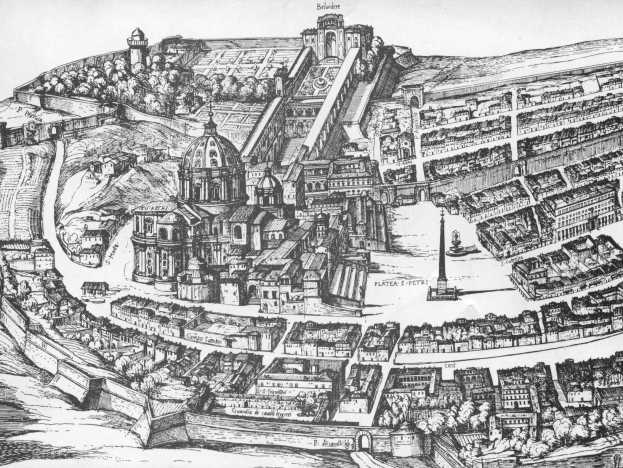
The college in 1593

== Pontificio Collegio Teutonico di S. Maria dell’ Anima ==
The Collegio Teutonico di S. Maria dell’ Anima is a residential college for priests who study at one of the Pontifical Athenaeums for advanced studies or work in the Roman Curia. It includes Santa Maria dell'Anima, the church of the German-speaking Catholics in Rome, and the adjacent Priests' College, a residential college of priests.

== Collegio Teutonico del Campo Santo ==
The site of the Campo Santo dei Tedeschi goes back to the days of Charlemagne and was then called the Schola Francorum, a hospice for pilgrims. In the course of time the German residents in Rome were buried in the church of the Schola, then called S. Salvatore in Turri.

In 1454, a confraternity was established, and in addition the guilds of German bakers and cobblers had their quarters there. In 1876, the hospice was replaced by the Collegio Teutonico del Campo Santo, to receive priests belonging to the German Empire or German provinces of Austria, who remained there for about two years pursuing their studies and officiating in the Church of Santa Maria della Pietà in Camposanto dei Teutonici.

The college has a library specializing in Christian archeology with an important collection of early Christian art put together by Anton de Waal, the rector. In 1888, the Roman institute of the Görresgesellschaft was established at the college. Together they publish a quarterly review, the "Römische Quartalschrift fur christliche Archäologie und Kirchengeschichte".

During World War I, the Italian government laid claim to the College Teutonico, but the attempt failed.

During World War II, Hugh O'Flaherty operated the "Rome Escape Line" clandestinely from his room in the Collegio Teutonico. O'Flaherty and his associates managed to hide about 6,500 escapees, mainly Allied soldiers and Jews, in flats, farms and convents. Some young Italians avoiding military service also found refuge at the college.

Pope Benedict XVI raised the college to the Pontifical College of Priests.

=== Location ===
The Campo Santo is located within the Vatican borders next to the historic cemetery of German pilgrims in Rome. The adjacent church, Santa Maria della Pietà in Camposanto dei Teutonici, is outside the Vatican, but governed by the 1929 Lateran Treaty and has extraterritorial status. It can only be accessed from inside the Vatican.

The Campo Santo houses the "Archconfraternity of Santa Maria della Pietà in the Campo Santo dei Teutonici and Fiamminghi", the Teutonic College of Santa Maria in Campo Santo, and the Roman Institute of the Görres Society. The Archconfraternity is the owner of the entire complex.

== See also ==
- Franz Joseph Dölger
- Roman Colleges
- Santa Maria della Pietà in Camposanto dei Teutonici
- Teutonic Cemetery
