= Santa Maria della Pietà in Camposanto dei Teutonici =

Church of Our Lady of Mercy in the Teutonic Cemetery
- Sancta Maria Pietatis in Coemeterio Teutonicorum (in Latin); Santa Maria della Pietà in Camposanto dei Teutonici (in Italian)
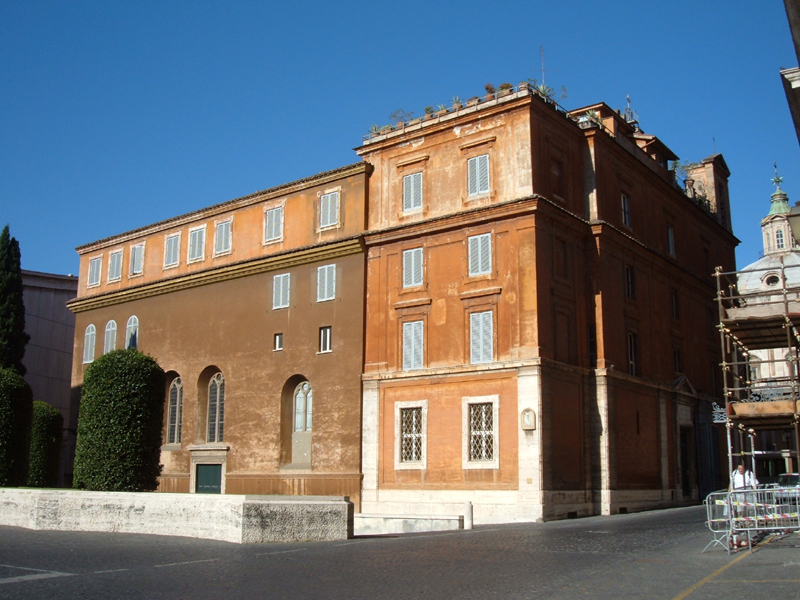
- Building complex in which is inserted the National Church in Rome of Austria, Germany, the Netherlands.
- Click on the map for a fullscreen view
- 41°54′05″N 12°27′17″E
- Location: Piazza del S. Uffizio, Borgo, Rome
- Country: Italy
- Denomination: Roman Catholic
- Tradition: Roman rite
- Website: Official website

History
- Status: national Catholic church of Austria, Germany, and the Netherlands
- Dedication: Our Lady of Sorrows
- Consecrated: 1500

Architecture
- Architectural type: Church
- Style: Baroque
- Groundbreaking: 1450
- Completed: 15th century

Specifications
- Length: 30 metres (98 ft)
- Width: 18 metres (59 ft)

The Church of Our Lady of Mercy in the Teutonic Cemetery (Latin: Sancta Maria Pietatis in Coemeterio Teutonicorum, Italian: Santa Maria della Pietà in Camposanto dei Teutonici) is a Roman Catholic church in the rione Borgo of Rome, Italy. It is located on the Via della Sagrestia.

The building lies near the Vatican City, is attached and adjacent to the Collegio Teutonico, and the German Teutonic Cemetery in Vatican City.

The site belonged to the Schola Francorum, a hospice for German pilgrims which was the oldest German institution in Rome. The church, lying in piazza Protomartiri Romani, is in the area of the Palazzo del Sant'Uffizo, which belongs to Italy but according to the Lateran Treaty has an extraterritorial status in favour of the Holy See.

The term "Teutonico" is a reference to the Germanic peoples. The church is the National Church in Rome of Austria, Germany, and the Netherlands.

== History ==
In 796 Charlemagne, by permission of Pope Leo III, founded on ground adjoining this spot a hospice for pilgrims, which was intended for the people of his empire. In connection with the hospice was a church dedicated to the Saviour and a graveyard for the burial of the subjects of Charlemagne who died in Rome. From the beginning, this foundation was placed under the care of the ecclesiastical authorities of St Peter's. The decline, soon after this period, of the Carolingian empire, brought the hospice, the Schola Francorum, entirely under the jurisdiction of the basilica; at the same time, the original intent of a place for pilgrims and the poor was preserved. In the complete ruin which overtook Rome during the Avignon Papacy (1309–1378), and during the following decades of the Western Schism, the ecclesiastical foundations in the vicinity of St. Peter's sank into decay.

After the return of the popes, new life sprang up, and the enthusiasm for building and endowing foundations in the Borgo was rekindled under Popes Martin V, Eugenius IV, and Nicholas V. The remembrance of Charlemagne and his hospice revived in the mind of the large and influential German colony then residing at Rome, and during the reign of Martin V (1417–1431) the enlarged cemetery was surrounded with a wall built by Fredericus Alemannus, who also erected a house for its guardians. During the plague outbreak of 1448, Johannis Assonensis, a German confessor attached to St. Peter's and later Bishop of Wurzburg, assembled his countrymen there and founded among them a brotherhood, the object of which was to provide suitable burial for all poor Germans dying in Rome. When the Holy Year 1450 brought many pilgrims to Rome, the brotherhood built a church, a new hospice for German pilgrims on the adjoining land, and developed the Campo Santo into a German national institution.

In the 15th, 16th, and even in the 19th century the German nation was represented at Rome by numerous officials at the papal court and by guilds of German bakers, shoemakers, and weavers; in these ages Germans were to be found in every industry of ordinary life, and German bankers and inn-keepers were especially numerous. Nevertheless, the steadily decreasing German population of Rome during the 17th and 18th centuries caused the Campo Santo, as a national foundation, and the brotherhood to sink into neglect.

The church was progressively eclipsed by the church of Saint Maria dell' Anima. In 1876 Pope Pius IX founded a seminary for German-speaking priests for the special study of archaeology and church history to replace the Schola Francorum. Today, the church is still an important gathering place for the German-speaking community in Rome.

== Description ==
The present church was built in 1501 and remodeled in 1972. Access to the Church (from the cemetery) is through a portal by sculptor Elmar Hillebrand of Cologne, given in 1957 by the President of the Republic of Germany Theodor Heuss.

During the Sack of Rome (1527), the Swiss Guard made their last stand in the Teutonic Cemetery, holding off the invading troops long enough for Pope Clement VII to escape over the Passetto di Borgo to Castel Sant'Angelo. The Chapel of the Swiss served as a burial place for the fallen guards.

A guide from the early 19th century mentions a main altarpiece depicting a Deposition by Polidoro di Caravaggio, flanked by painting by Giacinto d'Hasse. This latter painter's tomb monument, located inside the church, was sculpted by Francois Duquesnoy. The lateral altars housed a St Erasmus by Giacinto Gimignani and Epiphany by Scarsellino; the altar dedicated to St Charles Borromeo had an altarpiece depicting the Flight to Egypt by Arrigo Fiammingo, a member of the Confraternity; St John Nepomunk by Ignazio Stern; and the sacristy held an Immaculate Conception by Luigi Garzi.

== See also ==
- Index of Vatican City-related articles
- Teutonic Cemetery

== Sources ==
- Grundmann, Stefan; Fürst, Ulrich (1998). The Architecture of Rome. Stuttgart: Ed. Axel Menges. pp. 107–108. ISBN 3-930698-60-9.
