= Ottogerd Mühlmann =

German academic

Ottogerd Ludwig Wilhelm Mühlmann (12 February 1908, in Schmargendorf – 26 May 1987, in Nuremberg) was a German academic, art historian, notable for his work in historical preservation.

== Selected works ==
=== Monographs ===
- Untersuchungen zum „Geschoßbuch“ der Stadt Jena vom Jahre 1406, Jena: Vopelius 1938 (Teildruck der Dissertation).
- Kirchspiel Frießnitz. Baugeschichte und Ausstattung seiner Kirchen, Weida: Aderholds Buchdruckerei 1939.
- Das Leben eines Biedermeiers. Carl Ludwig Wachler, Weida 1941.
- Über das Antlitz unserer Thüringer Ahnen. Die Schnitzfiguren des Reichenfelser Museums und ihre Bedeutung für die Gegenwart, Weida (Selbstverlag): Emil Wüst & Söhne (Druckerei) 1945.
- Festschrift zum 500-jährigen Altarjubiläum in Friesau, Lobenstein: Goehring 1947.
- Baudenkmäler aus Jenas Umgebung. Zeugen unserer Vergangenheit (= Veröffentlichung der Volkshochschule Jena-Stadt), Jena 1954.
- Jena als mittelalterliche Stadt (= Bilder zur Geschichte Jenas, Band 2), Jena 1956, 2. Aufl. Jena: Kessler 1959.
- Die Universitätsstadt Jena (= Bilder zur Geschichte Jenas, Band 3), Jena: Kessler 1956; 2. Aufl. 1959.
- Schöne Heimat um Jena. Täler und Höhen, Dörfer und Kirchen, Burgen und Ruinen, Erwandertes und Erforschtes in Jenas Umgebung, Teilband 1 (= Schriften des Stadtmuseums Jena, Band 6), Jena: Kessler 1967; Teilband 2 (= Schriften des Stadtmuseums Jena, Band 9), Jena: Keßler 1970.
- Die Steine reden. Kirchen der Superintendentur Jena in Wort und Bild, Evangelische Verlagsanstalt Berlin 1970.
- Seltene Funde und Forschungen eines Denkmalpflegers. Beiträge aus Jena sowie seiner näheren und weiteren Umgebung, Nürnberg 1977.

=== Papers ===
- Florian Geyer, ein Vorkämpfer völkisch-sozialen Wesens. Vortrag, gehalten am 1. Februar 1943 in der Deutschen Gesellschaft zu Leipzig, in: Nationalsozialistische Monatshefte, Folge 155/156 (1943), Februar/März, S. 58–70/130–142.
- Dr. Heinrich Bergner. Pfarrer und Kunsthistoriker, in: Willy Quandt (Bearb.): Bedeutende Männer aus Thüringer Pfarrhäusern. Gabe der Thüringer Kirche an das Thüringer Volk, Evangelische Verlagsanstalt Berlin 1957, S. 112–120.
- Künderin Thüringer Volkstums: Marthe Renate Fischer. Zur Wiederkehr ihres Geburtstages am 17. August 1851, in: Rudolstädter Heimathefte, 7. Jg. (1961), Heft 8/9, S. 221–223.
- Die tausendjährige Tradition der Kirche in Lobeda bei Jena, in: Aus zwölf Jahrhunderten. Einundzwanzig Beiträge zur thüringischen Kirchengeschichte (= Thüringer kirchliche Studien, Band 2), Evangelische Verlagsanstalt Berlin 1971, S. 45–57.
- Die Wallfahrtskirche zu Ziegenhain bei Jena. Eine Dokumentation über das Bauwerk und seine Geschichte, in: Jahrbuch für die Geschichte Mittel- und Ostdeutschlands, Band 29 (1980), S. 96–112.
- Das spätgotische Altarwerk in Ammerbach bei Jena, in: Kultur und Geschichte Thüringens 4 (1983), S. 107–127.
- Burg Orlamünde an der Saale, in: Kultur und Geschichte 6 (1985), S. 101–112.
- [Von einem, der Jena liebte]: Abriß einer Geschichte der Denkmalschutzbewegung in Jena nach 1945, in: Kultur und Geschichte Thüringens 7 (1986/87), S. 121–143.

== Sources ==
- Joachim Hendel: „Von einem, der Jena liebte“ – Ottogerd Mühlmann (1908-1987). Heimatforscher, Denkmalschützer, Rassewart, in: Gerbergasse 18, Ausgabe 71 (2014), Heft 2, S. 29–34. geschichtswerkstatt-jena.de (ed.). "Biographie und Bibliographie" (PDF).
