= Stefan Heid =

German church historian

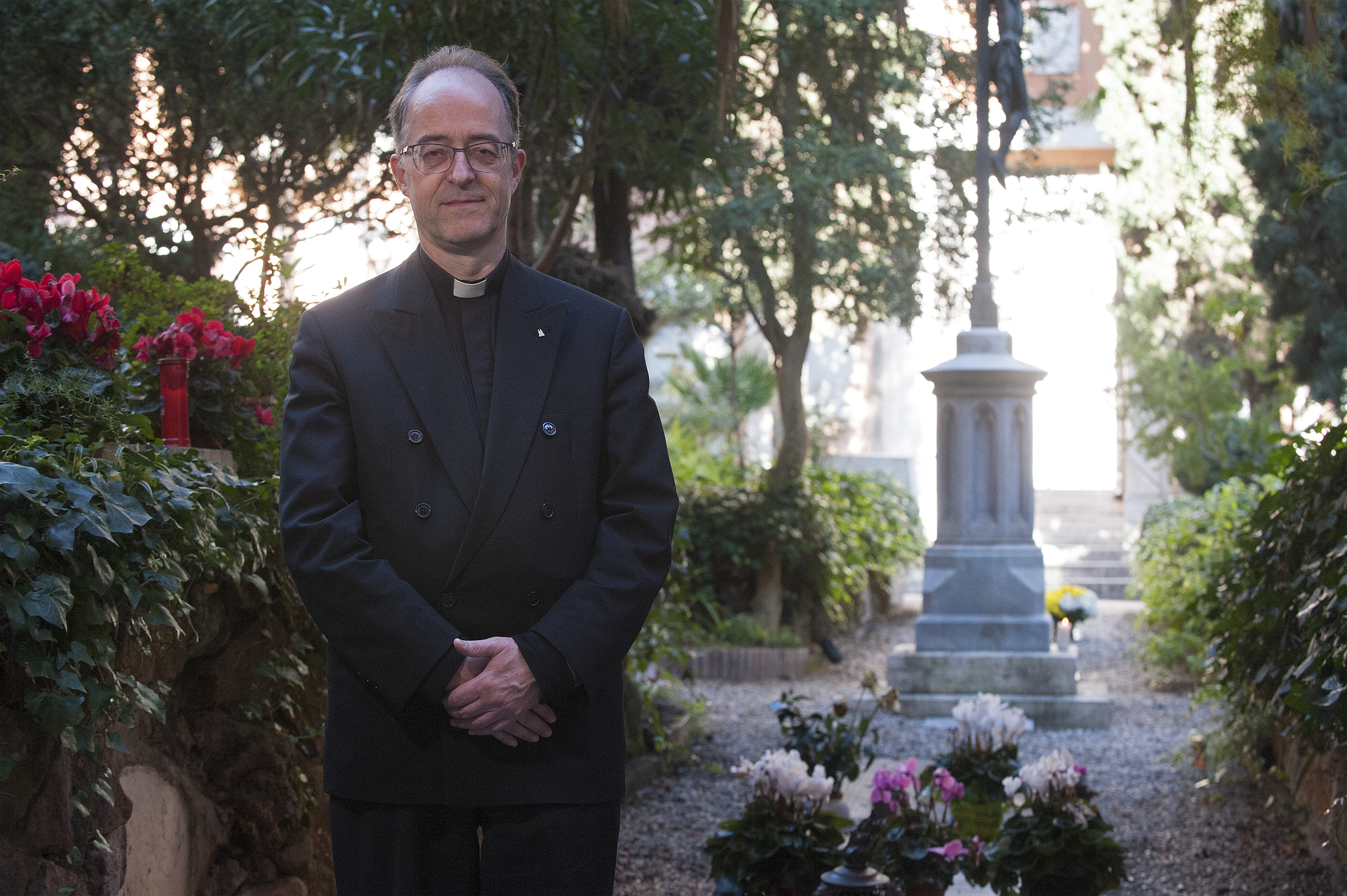
Heid in the Campo Santo Teutonico, 2021

Stefan Heid (born 28 December 1961 in Bad Homburg vor der Höhe) is a German Catholic priest, church historian and Christian archaeologist. Since 2020 he is rector of the Pontifical Institute of Christian Archeology. Heid is also since 2011 director of the Roman Institute of the Görres-Society.

== Early life and formation ==
Heid was born in Bad Homburg vor der Höhe in 1961. He is alumnus of the Kaiserin-Friedrich-Gymnasium. In 1991 he finished his studies in Catholic theology, Christian archeology and Classical Philology at University of Bonn with the doctorate in Theology. His dissertation under the guidance of Ernst Dassmann was about millennialism in the Early Church. In 2000, also at University of Bonn, he earned the habilitation for Ancient Church History, Patrology and Christian Archeology with the thesis Kreuz – Jerusalem – Kosmos. Aspekte frühchristlicher Staurologie.

== Priestly ministry ==
On 10 June 1994, Heid was ordained for the Roman Catholic Archdiocese of Cologne. From 1994 to 1996, he served as vicar of St. Servatius in Siegburg. Between 1999 and 2006, he was subsidiary vicar at the St. Quirinus church in Neuss, parallel to his duties in Rome.

During his postdoctoral studies from 1996 to 2012, Heid was enrolled in the Collegio Teutonico, serving for the last six years as its vice-rector. Since 1997 he is also a member of the Archconfraternity of Our Lady of Sorrows of the Germans and the Flemish in the Vatican.

Pope Benedict XVI elevated him on 29 December 1999, to the honorary rank of Monsignor.

== Academic activity ==
Since 2001 Heid has been teaching hagiography and liturgy at the Pontifical Institute of Christian Archeology. Since 2005 he is also visiting scholar at the Pontifical University of Saint Thomas Aquinas. In the academic year 2011–2012 he was research fellow at the Saint John's Seminary (Massachusetts). He is editor-in-chief of the Römische Quartalschrift für Christliche Altertumskunde und Kirchengeschichte and of the series Römischen Quartalschrift.Supplementbände. In 2015 he initiated the Roman Library Joseph Ratzinger – Benedikt XVI.

== Publications ==
- Heid, Stefan (1993). Chiliasmus und Antichrist-Mythos : eine frühchristliche Kontroverse um das Heilige Land (in German). Bonn: Borengässer. ISBN 3-923946-21-X. OCLC 28643890.
- Heid, Stefan (1997). Zölibat in der frühen Kirche : die Anfänge einer Enthaltsamkeitspflicht für Kleriker in Ost und West (in German). Paderborn: Schöningh. ISBN 3-506-73926-3. OCLC 37467773.
- Heid, Stefan (2001). Kreuz, Jerusalem, Kosmos : Aspekte frühchristlicher Staurologie (in German). Münster, Westfalen: Aschendorffsche Verlagsbuchhandlung. ISBN 3-402-08116-4. OCLC 48976822.
- Haltung und Richtung. Grundformen frühchristlichen Betens. In: Internationale katholische Zeitschrift Communio. Bd. 38, Nr. 6, 2009, ISSN 1439-6165, S. 611–619, (PDF; 50 KB).
- Gebetshaltung und Ostung in frühchristlicher Zeit. In: Rivista di Archeologia Cristiana. Bd. 82, 2006, ISSN 0035-6042, S. 347–404, (PDF; 3 MB).
- Gnilka, Christian; Heid, Stefan; Riesner, Rainer (2010). Blutzeuge Tod und Grab des Petrus in Rom (in German). Regensburg. ISBN 978-3-7954-2414-5. OCLC 670204836.
- Heid, Stefan (2000). Celibacy in the early church : the beginnings of a discipline of obligatory continence for clerics in East and West. San Francisco, CA: Ignatius Press. ISBN 0-89870-800-1. OCLC 46797948.
- Heid, Stefan (2011). Petrus und Paulus in Rom eine interdisziplinäre Debatte (in German). Freiburg, Br. ISBN 978-3-451-30705-8. OCLC 750995104.
- Heid, Stefan; Dennert, Martin (2012). Personenlexikon zur Christlichen Archäologie : Forscher und Persönlichkeiten vom 16. bis 21. Jahrhundert (in German). Regensburg: Schnell und Steiner. ISBN 978-3-7954-2620-0. OCLC 814283399.
- Heid, Stefan (2014). Operation am lebenden Objekt Roms Liturgiereformen von Trient bis zum Vaticanum II (in German). Berlin. ISBN 978-3-95410-032-3. OCLC 869477283.
- Matheus, Michael; Heid, Stefan (2015). Orte der Zuflucht und personeller Netzwerke der Campo Santo Teutonico und der Vatikan 1933 - 1955 (in German). Freiburg, Br. ISBN 978-3-451-30930-4. OCLC 867158717.
- Heid, Stefan (2016). Wohnen wie in Katakomben : kleine Museumsgeschichte des Campo Santo Teutonico (in German). Regensburg: Schnell & Steiner. ISBN 978-3-7954-3183-9. OCLC 959227215.
- Heid, Stefan; Hummel, Karl-Joseph; Verlag Herder (2018). Päpstlichkeit und Patriotismus der Campo Santo Teutonico: Ort der Deutschen in Rom zwischen Risorgimento und Erstem Weltkrieg (1870–1918) (in German). Freiburg. ISBN 978-3-451-38130-0. OCLC 1032359311.
- Heid, Stefan; Verlag Schnell & Steiner (2019). Altar und Kirche Prinzipien christlicher Liturgie (in German). Regensburg. ISBN 978-3-7954-3425-0. OCLC 1076504933.
- Barbato, Mariano; Heid, Stefan; Verlag Herder (2020). Macht und Mobilisierung der politische Aufstieg des Papsttums seit dem Ausgang des 19. Jahrhunderts (in German). Freiburg. ISBN 978-3-451-38573-5. OCLC 1098346485.
