= Personenlexikon zur Christlichen Archäologie =

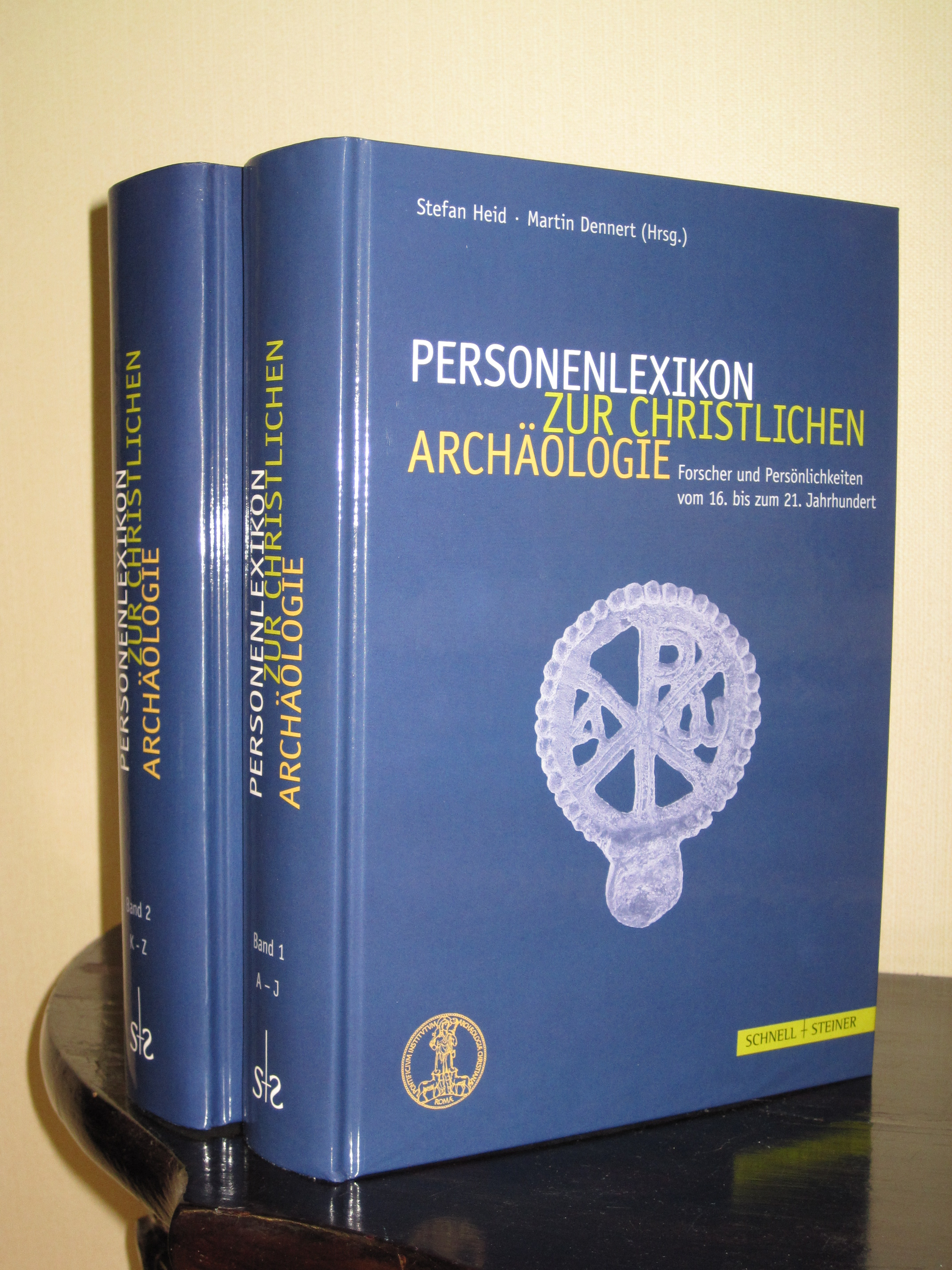
Personenlexikon zur Christlichen Archäologie

The Personenlexikon zur Christlichen Archäologie: Forscher und Persönlichkeiten vom 16. bis zum 21. Jahrhundert is a German biographical dictionary of figures in biblical archaeology from the 16th century to the present day. It includes entries on individuals from thirty countries in Europe, Asia, North Africa and North America.

== Bibliography ==
- (in German) Stefan Heid, Martin Dennert (ed.): Personenlexikon zur Christlichen Archäologie. Forscher und Persönlichkeiten vom 16. bis zum 21. Jahrhundert. 2 Bände. Schnell & Steiner, Regensburg 2012, ISBN 978-3-7954-2620-0.
- (in German) Stefan Heid: Zum Projekt einer Prosopographie zur Christlichen Archäologie. In: Römische Quartalschrift für christliche Altertumskunde und Kirchengeschichte. Bd. 102 (2007), S. 215–224.
