= Teutonic Cemetery =

Burial site in Vatican City

- Italian: Campo Santo dei Teutonici e dei Fiamminghi
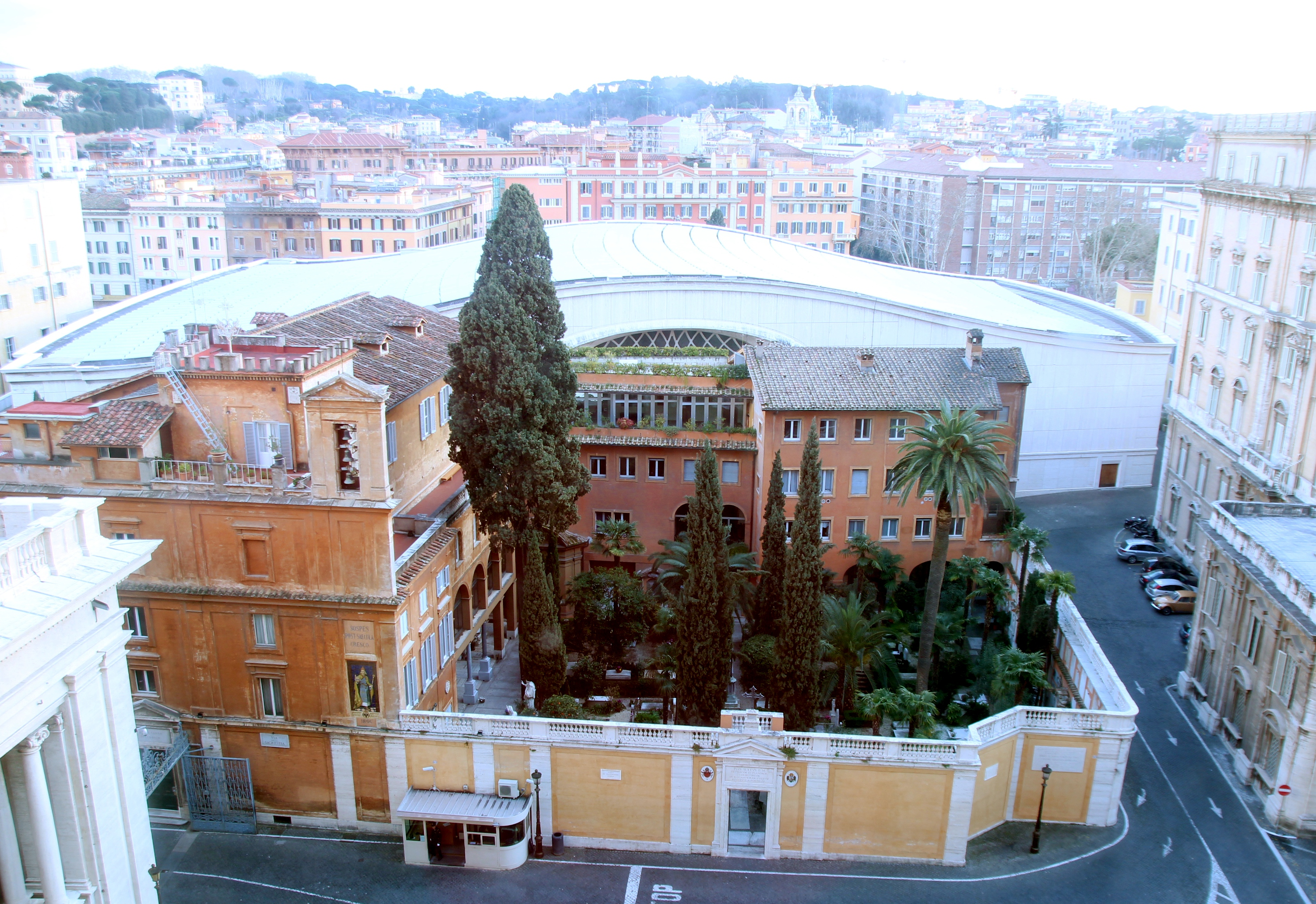
- The Teutonic Cemetery seen from above, in the courtyard of Collegio Teutonico.
- Interactive map of Teutonic Cemetery

Details
- Location: Rome
- Coordinates: 41°54′05.04″N 012°27′15.84″E
- Find a Grave: Teutonic Cemetery

The Teutonic Cemetery (Italian: Campo Santo dei Teutonici e dei Fiamminghi, "Camposanto of the Teutons and the Flemish") is a burial site in Rome adjacent to St. Peter's Basilica. Burial is reserved for members of the Confraternity of Our Lady of the German Cemetery, which owns the cemetery. It is a place of pilgrimage for many German-speaking pilgrims.

The cemetery lies entirely outside the borders of Vatican City. It is an extraterritorial property of the Holy See as designated under the Lateran Treaty of 1929.

== History ==
Located where the Circus of Nero once stood, during the period of the Roman Empire, it was the site of the martyrdom of many of the early Christians of the city. The cemetery chapel of Our Lady of Sorrows marks the spot where St. Peter was killed.

It is reported that Pope Leo III gave the land to Charlemagne in 799 for a hospice, called the Schola Francorum, for German pilgrims. In connection with the hospice was a church dedicated to the Saviour and a graveyard for the burial of the subjects of Charlemagne who died in Rome. Since the fifteenth century the soil of this cemetery has been held to be sacred earth from Jerusalem. This tradition, in connection with the immediate vicinity of the graves of the Apostles and with the memory of the first martyrs under Nero, explains the name of campus sanctus, "holy field". The cemetery is owned by the Archconfraternity of Our Lady, formed in 1454 to preserve the grounds.

On 6 May 1527, during the Sack of Rome, it was the site of the 'Stand of the Swiss Guard' when the Pope's Swiss Guards held off mutinous German troops long enough for Pope Clement VII to escape over the Passetto di Borgo to Castel Sant'Angelo.

There are now two institutes of study and two chapels attached to the cemetery, one being the burial place of the Swiss Guards who fell in defense of the city against the forces of the new Kingdom of Italy in 1870. The Collegio Teutonico del Campo Santo replaced the hospice in 1876 to receive priests belonging to the German Empire or German provinces of Austria, who remained there for two or, at the most, three years pursuing their studies and officiating in the Church of Santa Maria della Pietà in Camposanto dei Teutonici.

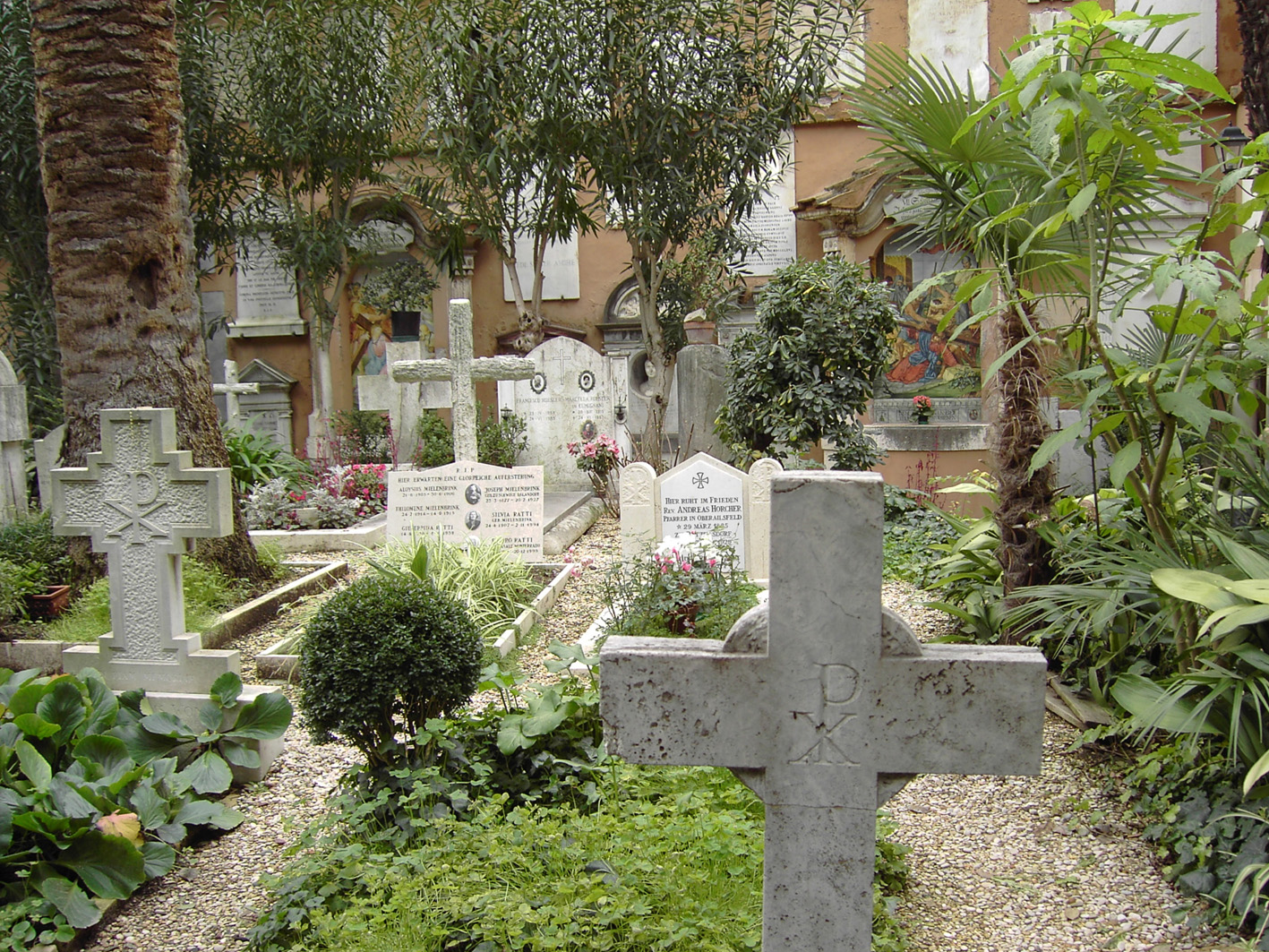
Cimitero Teutonico at Collegio Teutonico

The cemetery is reserved for the burial of members of the Santa Maria della Pietà Confraternity, a confraternity originally with membership only for citizens of the Holy Roman Empire, and members of the German colleges and religious houses in Rome.

In February 2015, Willy Herteleer, a homeless Flemish man, was buried in the cemetery with the assistance of Paul Badde, a German journalist and a member of the Archconfraternity, after approval by Pope Francis and reflecting his maxim that he wanted "a poor church, for the poor".

== Burials ==
- Johann Baptist Anzer S.V.D.
- Ludwig Curtius, archaeologist
- Gustav Adolf, Cardinal Prince of Hohenlohe-Schillingsfürst
- Prince Georg of Bavaria
- Engelbert Kirschbaum SJ, archaeologist
- Joseph Anton Koch, landscape painter
- Xavier de Mérode

Duchess Charlotte Frederica of Mecklenburg-Schwerin, the first wife of Christian VIII of Denmark, was allegedly buried here. Her tomb was opened on 11 July 2019 due to investigations related to the disappearance of Emanuela Orlandi, but was found to be empty.

== See also ==
- Collegio Teutonico
- Index of Vatican City-related articles
- Santa Maria della Pietà in Camposanto dei Teutonici

== Sources ==
- Moser, Christian: "Caspar Röist" in German, French and Italian in the online Historical Dictionary of Switzerland, 2009.
- R. Walpen, Die Päpstliche Schweizergarde (2006), 64–71.
