= Cardinal electors in the 2025 conclave =

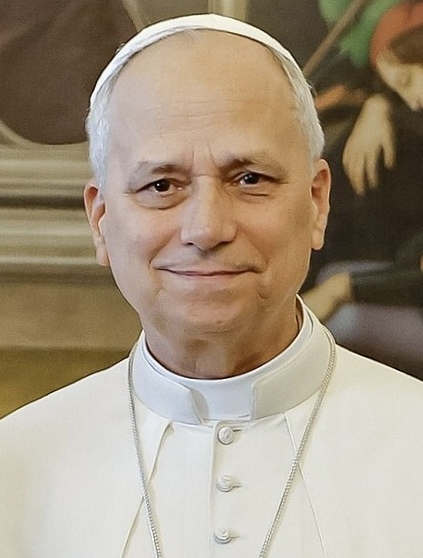
Cardinal Robert Francis Prevost was elected Pope Leo XIV by the conclave on 8 May 2025.

The papal conclave of 2025 was convened to elect a pope, the leader of the Catholic Church, to succeed Francis following his death on 21 April 2025. In accordance with the apostolic constitution Universi Dominici gregis, which governed the vacancy of the Holy See, only cardinals who had not passed their 80th birthdays on the day on which the Holy See became vacant (in this case, those who were born on or after 21 April 1945) were eligible to participate in the conclave. Although not a formal requirement, the cardinal electors have almost always elected the pope from among their number. The election was carried out by secret ballot (Latin: per scrutinium).

Of the 252 members of the College of Cardinals at the time of Francis's death, 135 cardinal electors were eligible to participate in the subsequent conclave. Two cardinal electors did not attend, decreasing the number of participants to 133. The required two-thirds supermajority needed to elect a pope was 89 votes. (Note: Since the promulgation of Romano Pontifici eligendo (1975), there has been a nominal maximum of 120 cardinal electors in a conclave, a rule reaffirmed in Universi Dominici gregis (1996). The 2025 conclave was the first since the introduction of this maximum in which there have been more than 120 eligible cardinal electors. Many canon lawyers took the opinion that the pope is not bound by this rule when choosing to appoint cardinal electors, and all eligible electors retain the right to participate in a conclave notwithstanding the nominal maximum. On 30 April 2025, the Congregation of Cardinals confirmed that all eligible cardinal electors would be able to participate in the forthcoming conclave.)

Of the 133 cardinal electors in attendance, 5 were cardinal bishops, 108 were cardinal priests, and 20 were cardinal deacons; 5 were created cardinals by Pope John Paul II, 20 by Pope Benedict XVI, and 108 by Pope Francis; 29 worked in the service of the Holy See (such as in the Roman Curia), 79 were in pastoral ministry outside Rome, and 26 were retired. The oldest cardinal elector was Carlos Osoro Sierra, at the age of 79, and the youngest was Mykola Bychok, at the age of 45. Another 116 cardinals were ineligible to participate in the conclave for reasons of age, the youngest of whom was George Alencherry, who had turned 80 on 19 April. (Note: Giovanni Angelo Becciu, despite being under the age of 80, resigned the rights and privileges of a cardinal in 2020, making him ineligible to participate in the conclave as an elector. His exclusion was confirmed by the Congregation of Cardinals on 30 April 2025.)

The cardinal electors entered the Sistine Chapel to begin the conclave on 7 May 2025. On 8 May, after four ballots over two days, they elected Cardinal Robert Francis Prevost, the prefect of the Dicastery for Bishops and president of the Pontifical Commission for Latin America, who took the papal name Leo XIV.

== Cardinal electors ==
The College of Cardinals is divided into three orders – cardinal bishops (CB), cardinal priests (CP), and cardinal deacons (CD) – with formal precedence in that sequence. This determines the order in which the cardinal electors process into the conclave, take the oath, and cast their ballots. For cardinal bishops (except the Eastern Catholic patriarchs), the dean of the College of Cardinals is first in precedence, followed by the vice-dean, (Note: Neither the dean (Giovanni Battista Re) nor the vice-dean (Leonardo Sandri) were under the age of 80 and eligible to participate in the conclave.) and then by the remainder in order of appointment as cardinal bishops. For cardinal bishops who are Eastern Catholic patriarchs, for cardinal priests, and for cardinal deacons, precedence is determined by the date of the consistory in which they were created cardinals and then by the order in which they appeared in the official announcement or bulletin.

Five of the cardinal electors were from the Eastern Catholic Churches: Louis Raphaël I Sako (Chaldean Church), Baselios Cleemis (Syro-Malankara Church), Berhaneyesus Demerew Souraphiel (Ethiopian Church), Mykola Bychok (Ukrainian Greek Church), and George Koovakad (Syro-Malabar Church). Two Eastern Catholic cardinals were the first cardinals from their respective sui iuris churches ever to participate in a papal conclave: Chaldean Patriarch Sako, (Note: Patriarch Sako is the second Chaldean Catholic patriarch to be made cardinal, the first being his predecessor Emmanuel III Delly who was created cardinal-patriarch in 2007 but was never a cardinal-elector having already turned 80.) and Ethiopian Archbishop Souraphiel. (Note: Cardinal Souraphiel is the second Ethiopian cardinal, the first being his immediate predecessor Paulos Tzadua who turned 80 before having an opportunity to participate in a conclave.) The senior cardinal bishop, the senior cardinal priest, the senior cardinal deacon, and the junior cardinal deacon, who were assigned specific roles in the conclave, such as preciding over the conclave itself (the senior cardinal bishop) or announcing the election of the pope, were, respectively, Pietro Parolin, Vinko Puljić, Dominique Mamberti, and George Koovakad. The camerlengo of the Holy Roman Church, who was in charge of administering the Holy See during its vacancy, was Kevin Farrell. Timothy Radcliffe was the only cardinal elector who was not a bishop.

The table below is sorted by default in order of precedence of the cardinal electors, and contains information as of 21 April 2025, the date on which the Holy See became vacant upon Pope Francis's death. All cardinals listed were members of the Latin Church unless otherwise stated. Cardinals belonging to institutes of consecrated life or societies of apostolic life are indicated by the relevant post-nominal letters. Cardinals in pastoral ministry are classified under the country in which their respective dioceses are located, although they may be citizens of another country.

* Elected pope

Rank	Name	Country	Born	Order	Consistory	Office	Ref.
1	Pietro Parolin	Italy	17 January 1955 (age 70)	CB	22 February 2014; Francis	Secretary of State of His Holiness	
2	Fernando Filoni	Italy	15 April 1946 (age 79)	CB	18 February 2012; Benedict XVI	Grand Master of the Order of the Holy Sepulchre	
3	Luis Antonio Tagle	Philippines	21 June 1957 (age 67)	CB	24 November 2012; Benedict XVI	Pro-Prefect of the Dicastery for Evangelization	
4	Robert Francis Prevost OSA*	United States; Peru (Note: This person holds multiple citizenship.)	14 September 1955 (age 69)	CB	30 September 2023; Francis	Prefect of the Dicastery for Bishops	
5	Louis Raphaël I Sako	Iraq	4 July 1948 (age 76)	CB	28 June 2018; Francis	Patriarch of Baghdad (Chaldean Church)	
6	Vinko Puljić	Bosnia and Herzegovina	8 September 1945 (age 79)	CP	26 November 1994; John Paul II	Archbishop emeritus of Vrhbosna	
7	Peter Turkson	Ghana	11 October 1948 (age 76)	CP	21 October 2003; John Paul II	Chancellor of the Pontifical Academy of Sciences and the Pontifical Academy of Social Sciences	
8	Josip Bozanić	Croatia	20 March 1949 (age 76)	CP	21 October 2003; John Paul II	Archbishop emeritus of Zagreb	
9	Philippe Barbarin	France	17 October 1950 (age 74)	CP	21 October 2003; John Paul II	Archbishop emeritus of Lyon	
10	Péter Erdő	Hungary	25 June 1952 (age 72)	CP	21 October 2003; John Paul II	Archbishop of Esztergom–Budapest	
11	Stanisław Ryłko	Poland	4 July 1945 (age 79)	CP	24 November 2007; Benedict XVI	Archpriest of the Papal Basilica of Saint Mary Major	
12	Francisco Robles Ortega	Mexico	2 March 1949 (age 76)	CP	24 November 2007; Benedict XVI	Archbishop of Guadalajara	
13	Daniel DiNardo	United States	23 May 1949 (age 75)	CP	24 November 2007; Benedict XVI	Archbishop emeritus of Galveston–Houston	
14	Odilo Scherer	Brazil	21 September 1949 (age 75)	CP	24 November 2007; Benedict XVI	Archbishop of São Paulo	
15	Robert Sarah	Guinea	15 June 1945 (age 79)	CP	20 November 2010; Benedict XVI	Prefect emeritus of the Congregation for Divine Worship and the Discipline of the Sacraments	
16	Raymond Leo Burke	United States	30 June 1948 (age 76)	CP	20 November 2010; Benedict XVI	Patron emeritus of the Sovereign Military Order of Malta	
17	Kurt Koch	Switzerland	15 March 1950 (age 75)	CP	20 November 2010; Benedict XVI	Prefect of the Dicastery for Promoting Christian Unity	
18	Kazimierz Nycz	Poland	1 February 1950 (age 75)	CP	20 November 2010; Benedict XVI	Archbishop emeritus of Warsaw	
19	Malcolm Ranjith	Sri Lanka	15 November 1947 (age 77)	CP	20 November 2010; Benedict XVI	Archbishop of Colombo	
20	Reinhard Marx	Germany	21 September 1953 (age 71)	CP	20 November 2010; Benedict XVI	Archbishop of Munich and Freising and Coordinator of the Council for the Economy	
21	João Braz de Aviz	Brazil	24 April 1947 (age 77)	CP	18 February 2012; Benedict XVI	Prefect emeritus of the Dicastery for Institutes of Consecrated Life and Societies of Apostolic Life	
22	Thomas Collins	Canada	16 January 1947 (age 78)	CP	18 February 2012; Benedict XVI	Archbishop emeritus of Toronto	
23	Wim Eijk	Netherlands	22 June 1953 (age 71)	CP	18 February 2012; Benedict XVI	Archbishop of Utrecht	
24	Giuseppe Betori	Italy	25 February 1947 (age 78)	CP	18 February 2012; Benedict XVI	Archbishop emeritus of Florence	
25	Timothy Dolan	United States	6 February 1950 (age 75)	CP	18 February 2012; Benedict XVI	Archbishop of New York	
26	Rainer Woelki	Germany	18 August 1956 (age 68)	CP	18 February 2012; Benedict XVI	Archbishop of Cologne	
27	James Michael Harvey	United States	20 October 1949 (age 75)	CP	24 November 2012; Benedict XVI	Archpriest of the Papal Basilica of Saint Paul Outside the Walls	
28	Baselios Cleemis	India	15 June 1959 (age 65)	CP	24 November 2012; Benedict XVI	Major Archbishop of Trivandrum (Syro-Malankara Church)	
29	Gerhard Ludwig Müller	Germany	31 December 1947 (age 77)	CP	22 February 2014; Francis	Prefect emeritus of the Congregation for the Doctrine of the Faith	
30	Vincent Nichols	United Kingdom	8 November 1945 (age 79)	CP	22 February 2014; Francis	Archbishop of Westminster	
31	Leopoldo Brenes	Nicaragua	7 March 1949 (age 76)	CP	22 February 2014; Francis	Archbishop of Managua	
32	Gérald Lacroix ISPX	Canada	27 July 1957 (age 67)	CP	22 February 2014; Francis	Archbishop of Quebec	
33	Jean-Pierre Kutwa	Ivory Coast	22 December 1945 (age 79)	CP	22 February 2014; Francis	Archbishop emeritus of Abidjan	
34	Orani João Tempesta OCist	Brazil	23 June 1950 (age 74)	CP	22 February 2014; Francis	Archbishop of São Sebastião do Rio de Janeiro	
35	Mario Aurelio Poli	Argentina	29 November 1947 (age 77)	CP	22 February 2014; Francis	Archbishop emeritus of Buenos Aires	
36	Philippe Ouédraogo	Burkina Faso	31 December 1945 (Note: Ouédraogo's actual date of birth is unknown. In the 2024 edition of the Annuario Pontificio, the annual directory of the Holy See, his birth date was revised from 25 January 1945 to 31 December, a placeholder date used by the Burkina Faso government. Ouédraogo adopted 25 January as his date of birth "at random" to enrol in a health-insurance programme in 1973.) (age 79)	CP	22 February 2014; Francis	Archbishop emeritus of Ouagadougou	
37	Chibly Langlois	Haiti	29 November 1958 (age 66)	CP	22 February 2014; Francis	Bishop of Les Cayes	
38	Manuel Clemente	Portugal	16 July 1948 (age 76)	CP	14 February 2015; Francis	Patriarch emeritus of Lisbon	
39	Berhaneyesus Demerew Souraphiel CM	Ethiopia	14 July 1948 (age 76)	CP	14 February 2015; Francis	Archbishop of Addis Abeba (Ethiopian Church)	
40	John Dew	New Zealand	5 May 1948 (age 76)	CP	14 February 2015; Francis	Archbishop emeritus of Wellington	
41	Charles Maung Bo SDB	Myanmar	29 October 1948 (age 76)	CP	14 February 2015; Francis	Archbishop of Yangon	
42	Kriengsak Kovitvanit	Thailand	27 June 1949 (age 75)	CP	14 February 2015; Francis	Archbishop emeritus of Bangkok	
43	Francesco Montenegro	Italy	22 May 1946 (age 78)	CP	14 February 2015; Francis	Archbishop emeritus of Agrigento	
44	Daniel Sturla SDB	Uruguay	4 July 1959 (age 65)	CP	14 February 2015; Francis	Archbishop of Montevideo	
45	Arlindo Gomes Furtado	Cape Verde	15 November 1949 (age 75)	CP	14 February 2015; Francis	Bishop of Santiago de Cabo Verde	
46	Soane Patita Paini Mafi	Tonga	19 December 1961 (age 63)	CP	14 February 2015; Francis	Bishop of Tonga	
47	Dieudonné Nzapalainga CSSp	Central African Republic	14 March 1967 (age 58)	CP	19 November 2016; Francis	Archbishop of Bangui	
48	Carlos Osoro Sierra	Spain	16 May 1945 (age 79)	CP	19 November 2016; Francis	Archbishop emeritus of Madrid	
49	Sérgio da Rocha	Brazil	21 October 1959 (age 65)	CP	19 November 2016; Francis	Archbishop of São Salvador da Bahia	
50	Blase J. Cupich	United States	19 March 1949 (age 76)	CP	19 November 2016; Francis	Archbishop of Chicago	
51	Jozef De Kesel	Belgium	17 June 1947 (age 77)	CP	19 November 2016; Francis	Archbishop emeritus of Mechelen–Brussels	
52	Carlos Aguiar Retes	Mexico	9 January 1950 (age 75)	CP	19 November 2016; Francis	Archbishop of Mexico	
53	John Ribat MSC	Papua New Guinea	9 February 1957 (age 68)	CP	19 November 2016; Francis	Archbishop of Port Moresby	
54	Joseph W. Tobin CSsR	United States	3 May 1952 (age 72)	CP	19 November 2016; Francis	Archbishop of Newark	
55	Juan José Omella	Spain	21 April 1946 (age 79)	CP	28 June 2017; Francis	Archbishop of Barcelona	
56	Anders Arborelius OCD	Sweden	24 September 1949 (age 75)	CP	28 June 2017; Francis	Bishop of Stockholm	
57	Angelo De Donatis	Italy	4 January 1954 (age 71)	CP	28 June 2018; Francis	Major Penitentiary	
58	Joseph Coutts	Pakistan	21 July 1945 (age 79)	CP	28 June 2018; Francis	Archbishop emeritus of Karachi	
59	António Marto	Portugal	5 May 1947 (age 77)	CP	28 June 2018; Francis	Bishop emeritus of Leiria–Fátima	
60	Désiré Tsarahazana	Madagascar	13 June 1954 (age 70)	CP	28 June 2018; Francis	Archbishop of Toamasina	
61	Giuseppe Petrocchi	Italy	19 August 1948 (age 76)	CP	28 June 2018; Francis	Archbishop emeritus of L'Aquila	
62	Thomas Aquino Manyo Maeda	Japan	3 March 1949 (age 76)	CP	28 June 2018; Francis	Archbishop of Osaka–Takamatsu	
63	Ignatius Suharyo Hardjoatmodjo	Indonesia	9 July 1950 (age 74)	CP	5 October 2019; Francis	Archbishop of Jakarta	
64	Juan García Rodríguez	Cuba	11 July 1948 (age 76)	CP	5 October 2019; Francis	Archbishop of San Cristóbal de la Habana	
65	Fridolin Ambongo Besungu OFMCap	Democratic Republic of the Congo	24 January 1960 (age 65)	CP	5 October 2019; Francis	Archbishop of Kinshasa	
66	Jean-Claude Hollerich SJ	Luxembourg	9 August 1958 (age 66)	CP	5 October 2019; Francis	Archbishop of Luxembourg	
67	Álvaro Leonel Ramazzini Imeri	Guatemala	16 July 1947 (age 77)	CP	5 October 2019; Francis	Bishop of Huehuetenango	
68	Matteo Zuppi	Italy	11 October 1955 (age 69)	CP	5 October 2019; Francis	Archbishop of Bologna	
69	Cristóbal López Romero SDB	Morocco (Note: López Romero was born in Spain and had served as a bishop in Morocco since 2018.)	19 May 1952 (age 72)	CP	5 October 2019; Francis	Archbishop of Rabat	
70	Antoine Kambanda	Rwanda	10 November 1958 (age 66)	CP	28 November 2020; Francis	Archbishop of Kigali	
71	Wilton Daniel Gregory	United States	7 December 1947 (age 77)	CP	28 November 2020; Francis	Archbishop emeritus of Washington	
72	Jose Advincula OP	Philippines	30 March 1952 (age 73)	CP	28 November 2020; Francis	Archbishop of Manila	
73	Augusto Paolo Lojudice	Italy	1 July 1964 (age 60)	CP	28 November 2020; Francis	Archbishop of Siena–Colle di Val d'Elsa–Montalcino and Bishop of Montepulciano–Chiusi–Pienza	
74	Jean-Marc Aveline	France	26 December 1958 (age 66)	CP	27 August 2022; Francis	Archbishop of Marseille	
75	Peter Okpaleke	Nigeria	1 March 1963 (age 62)	CP	27 August 2022; Francis	Bishop of Ekwulobia	
76	Leonardo Ulrich Steiner OFM	Brazil	6 November 1950 (age 74)	CP	27 August 2022; Francis	Archbishop of Manaus	
77	Filipe Neri Ferrão	India	20 January 1953 (age 72)	CP	27 August 2022; Francis	Archbishop of Goa and Daman and Patriarch of the East Indies	
78	Robert McElroy	United States	5 February 1954 (age 71)	CP	27 August 2022; Francis	Archbishop of Washington	
79	Virgílio do Carmo da Silva SDB	Timor-Leste	27 November 1967 (age 57)	CP	27 August 2022; Francis	Archbishop of Díli	
80	Oscar Cantoni	Italy	1 September 1950 (age 74)	CP	27 August 2022; Francis	Bishop of Como	
81	Anthony Poola	India	15 November 1961 (age 63)	CP	27 August 2022; Francis	Archbishop of Hyderabad	
82	Paulo Cezar Costa	Brazil	20 July 1967 (age 57)	CP	27 August 2022; Francis	Archbishop of Brasília	
83	William Goh	Singapore	25 June 1957 (age 67)	CP	27 August 2022; Francis	Archbishop of Singapore	
84	Adalberto Martínez Flores	Paraguay	8 July 1951 (age 73)	CP	27 August 2022; Francis	Archbishop of Asunción	
85	Giorgio Marengo IMC	Mongolia (Note: Marengo was born in Italy and had served as a bishop in Mongolia since 2020.)	7 June 1974 (age 50)	CP	27 August 2022; Francis	Apostolic Prefect of Ulaanbaatar	
86	Pierbattista Pizzaballa OFM	Jerusalem (Note: The jurisdiction of the Latin Patriarchate of Jerusalem, based in the Church of the Holy Sepulchre in the Old City in East Jerusalem, is multinational and encompasses Cyprus, Jordan, Israel and Palestine. In its statistical report of the College of Cardinals, the Holy See Press Office lists Pizzaballa's country as "Jerusalem". Pizzaballa was born in Italy and has served as a bishop in Jerusalem since 2016.)	21 April 1965 (age 60)	CP	30 September 2023; Francis	Latin Patriarch of Jerusalem	
87	Stephen Brislin	South Africa	24 September 1956 (age 68)	CP	30 September 2023; Francis	Archbishop of Johannesburg	
88	Ángel Sixto Rossi SJ	Argentina	11 August 1958 (age 66)	CP	30 September 2023; Francis	Archbishop of Córdoba	
89	Luis José Rueda Aparicio	Colombia	3 March 1962 (age 63)	CP	30 September 2023; Francis	Archbishop of Bogotá	
90	Grzegorz Ryś	Poland	9 February 1964 (age 61)	CP	30 September 2023; Francis	Archbishop of Łódź	
91	Stephen Ameyu Martin Mulla	South Sudan	10 January 1964 (age 61)	CP	30 September 2023; Francis	Archbishop of Juba	
92	José Cobo Cano	Spain	20 September 1965 (age 59)	CP	30 September 2023; Francis	Archbishop of Madrid	
93	Protase Rugambwa	Tanzania	31 May 1960 (age 64)	CP	30 September 2023; Francis	Archbishop of Tabora	
94	Sebastian Francis	Malaysia	11 November 1951 (age 73)	CP	30 September 2023; Francis	Bishop of Penang	
95	Stephen Chow Sau-yan SJ	China (Hong Kong) (Note: Hong Kong is a special administrative region of China.)	7 August 1959 (age 65)	CP	30 September 2023; Francis	Bishop of Hong Kong	
96	François-Xavier Bustillo OFMConv	France (Note: Bustillo was born in Spain and had served as a bishop in France since 2021.)	23 November 1968 (age 56)	CP	30 September 2023; Francis	Bishop of Ajaccio	
97	Américo Aguiar	Portugal	12 December 1973 (age 51)	CP	30 September 2023; Francis	Bishop of Setúbal	
98	Carlos Castillo Mattasoglio	Peru	28 February 1950 (age 75)	CP	7 December 2024; Francis	Archbishop of Lima	
99	Vicente Bokalic Iglic CM	Argentina	11 June 1952 (age 72)	CP	7 December 2024; Francis	Archbishop of Santiago del Estero	
100	Luis Cabrera Herrera OFM	Ecuador	11 October 1955 (age 69)	CP	7 December 2024; Francis	Archbishop of Guayaquil	
101	Fernando Chomalí Garib	Chile	10 March 1957 (age 68)	CP	7 December 2024; Francis	Archbishop of Santiago de Chile	
102	Tarcisio Isao Kikuchi SVD	Japan	1 November 1958 (age 66)	CP	7 December 2024; Francis	Archbishop of Tokyo	
103	Pablo Virgilio David	Philippines	2 March 1959 (age 66)	CP	7 December 2024; Francis	Bishop of Kalookan	
104	Ladislav Nemet SVD	Serbia (Note: Nemet was born in Serbia into an ethnically Hungarian family and describes himself as Hungarian. He has worked in Serbia since 2008.)	7 September 1956 (age 68)	CP	7 December 2024; Francis	Archbishop of Belgrade	
105	Jaime Spengler OFM	Brazil	6 September 1960 (age 64)	CP	7 December 2024; Francis	Archbishop of Porto Alegre	
106	Ignace Bessi Dogbo	Ivory Coast	17 August 1961 (age 63)	CP	7 December 2024; Francis	Archbishop of Abidjan	
107	Jean-Paul Vesco OP	Algeria (Note: Vesco was born in France and had served as a bishop in Algeria since 2012.)	10 March 1962 (age 63)	CP	7 December 2024; Francis	Archbishop of Algiers	
108	Dominique Mathieu OFMConv	Iran (Note: Mathieu was born in Belgium and had served as a bishop in Iran since 2021.)	13 June 1963 (age 61)	CP	7 December 2024; Francis	Archbishop of Tehran–Isfahan	
109	Roberto Repole	Italy	29 January 1967 (age 58)	CP	7 December 2024; Francis	Archbishop of Turin and Bishop of Susa	
110	Baldassare Reina	Italy	26 November 1970 (age 54)	CP	7 December 2024; Francis	Vicar General for Rome and Archpriest of the Papal Basilica of Saint John Lateran	
111	Frank Leo	Canada	30 June 1971 (age 53)	CP	7 December 2024; Francis	Archbishop of Toronto	
112	Mykola Bychok CSsR	Australia (Note: Bychok was born in Ukraine and had served as a bishop in Australia since 2020.)	13 February 1980 (age 45)	CP	7 December 2024; Francis	Eparch of Saints Peter and Paul of Melbourne (Ukrainian Greek Church)	
113	Domenico Battaglia	Italy	20 January 1963 (age 62)	CP	7 December 2024; Francis	Archbishop of Naples	
114	Dominique Mamberti	France	7 March 1952 (age 73)	CD	14 February 2015; Francis	Prefect of the Supreme Tribunal of the Apostolic Signatura	
115	Mario Zenari	Italy	5 January 1946 (age 79)	CD	19 November 2016; Francis	Apostolic Nuncio to Syria	
116	Kevin Farrell	United States (Note: Farrell was born in Ireland, was incardinated as a priest in the United States in 1984 and served as a bishop there from 2001 to 2016.)	2 September 1947 (age 77)	CD	19 November 2016; Francis	Prefect of the Dicastery for the Laity, Family and Life and Camerlengo of the Holy Roman Church	
117	Konrad Krajewski	Poland	25 November 1963 (age 61)	CD	28 June 2018; Francis	Almoner of His Holiness	
118	José Tolentino de Mendonça	Portugal	15 December 1965 (age 59)	CD	5 October 2019; Francis	Prefect of the Dicastery for Culture and Education	
119	Michael Czerny SJ	Canada (Note: Czerny was born in Czechoslovakia (in the present-day Czech Republic) and emigrated to Canada as a child.)	18 July 1946 (age 78)	CD	5 October 2019; Francis	Prefect of the Dicastery for Promoting Integral Human Development	
120	Mario Grech	Malta	20 February 1957 (age 68)	CD	28 November 2020; Francis	Secretary-General of the Synod of Bishops	
121	Marcello Semeraro	Italy	22 December 1947 (age 77)	CD	28 November 2020; Francis	Prefect of the Dicastery for the Causes of Saints	
122	Mauro Gambetti OFMConv	Italy	27 October 1965 (age 59)	CD	28 November 2020; Francis	Vicar General for Vatican City, Archpriest of the Papal Basilica of Saint Peter and President of the Fabric of Saint Peter	
123	Arthur Roche	United Kingdom	6 March 1950 (age 75)	CD	27 August 2022; Francis	Prefect of the Dicastery for Divine Worship and the Discipline of the Sacraments	
124	Lazarus You Heung-sik	South Korea	17 November 1951 (age 73)	CD	27 August 2022; Francis	Prefect of the Dicastery for the Clergy	
125	Claudio Gugerotti	Italy	7 October 1955 (age 69)	CD	30 September 2023; Francis	Prefect of the Dicastery for the Eastern Churches	
126	Víctor Manuel Fernández	Argentina	18 July 1962 (age 62)	CD	30 September 2023; Francis	Prefect of the Dicastery for the Doctrine of the Faith	
127	Emil Paul Tscherrig	Switzerland	3 February 1947 (age 78)	CD	30 September 2023; Francis	Apostolic Nuncio emeritus to Italy and San Marino	
128	Christophe Pierre	France	30 January 1946 (age 79)	CD	30 September 2023; Francis	Apostolic Nuncio to the United States	
129	Ángel Fernández Artime SDB	Spain	21 August 1960 (age 64)	CD	30 September 2023; Francis	Pro-Prefect of the Dicastery for Institutes of Consecrated Life and Societies of Apostolic Life	
130	Rolandas Makrickas	Lithuania	31 January 1972 (age 53)	CD	7 December 2024; Francis	Coadjutor Archpriest of the Papal Basilica of Saint Mary Major	
131	Timothy Radcliffe OP	United Kingdom	22 August 1945 (age 79)	CD	7 December 2024; Francis	Master emeritus of the Order of Preachers (Note: Radcliffe was granted a dispensation by Pope Francis not to be ordained a bishop before being created a cardinal.)	
132	Fabio Baggio CS	Italy	15 January 1965 (age 60)	CD	7 December 2024; Francis	Undersecretary of the Migrants and Refugees Section of the Dicastery for Promoting Integral Human Development	
133	George Koovakad	India	11 August 1973 (age 51)	CD	7 December 2024; Francis	Prefect of the Dicastery for Interreligious Dialogue (Syro-Malabar Church)	

=== Not in attendance ===
Vinko Puljić initially announced that he did not plan to attend the conclave because of his health, but later decided to participate after receiving medical clearance.

Rank	Name	Country	Born	Order	Consistory	Office	Reason for absence	Refs.
1	Antonio Cañizares Llovera	Spain	15 October 1945 (age 79)	CP	24 March 2006; Benedict XVI	Archbishop emeritus of Valencia	Health	
2	John Njue	Kenya	1 January 1946 (Note: In 2025, the Holy See Press Office's list of cardinal electors and information page for Njue gave his date of birth as 1 January 1946, but previously stated that he was "born in 1944" or on 31 December 1944.) (age 79)	CP	24 November 2007; Benedict XVI	Archbishop emeritus of Nairobi	Health (Note: Njue said in an interview on 5 May 2025 that he had not received a formal invitation to participate in the conclave, but Philip Anyolo, Archbishop of Nairobi, clarified that Njue was unable to travel to Rome because of his health.)	

== Cardinal electors by continent and country ==
The 133 cardinal electors in attendance represented 70 countries on all six inhabited continents. The countries with the greatest numbers of cardinal electors were Italy (seventeen), the United States (ten), and Brazil (seven). The statistics for the global distribution of Catholics in the table below are sourced from the 2023 edition of the Annuarium Statisticum Ecclesiae (Statistical Yearbook of the Church), published in 2025.

Cardinal electors by region
Graphic with the numbers of cardinal electors in attendance from each region
Region	Number
Italy	17
Rest of Europe	35
North America	20
South America	17
Asia	23
Oceania	4
Africa	17
Total	133

1; 2; 3; 4; 5; 7; 10; 17; World map coloured according to the number of cardinal electors in attendance from each country

* Continent or country of elected pope

Cardinal electors by continent
Continent	Number	Percentage	Percentage of global Catholic population (2023)
Africa	17	12.8%	20.0%
North America*	20	15.0%	20.4%
South America	17	12.8%	27.4%
Asia	23	17.3%	11.0%
Europe	52	39.1%	20.4%
Oceania	4	3.0%	0.8%
Total	133	100.0%	100.0%

Cardinal electors by country
Country	Continent	Number
Algeria	Africa	1
Argentina	South America	4
Australia	Oceania	1
Belgium	Europe	1
Bosnia and Herzegovina	Europe	1
Brazil	South America	7
Burkina Faso	Africa	1
Canada	North America	4
Cape Verde	Africa	1
Central African Republic	Africa	1
Chile	South America	1
Colombia	South America	1
DR Congo	Africa	1
Croatia	Europe	1
Cuba	North America	1
Ecuador	South America	1
Ethiopia	Africa	1
France	Europe	5
Germany	Europe	3
Ghana	Africa	1
Guatemala	North America	1
Guinea	Africa	1
Haiti	North America	1
Hong Kong (China)	Asia	1
Hungary	Europe	1
India	Asia	4
Indonesia	Asia	1
Iran	Asia	1
Iraq	Asia	1
Italy	Europe	17
Ivory Coast	Africa	2
Japan	Asia	2
Jerusalem	Asia	1
South Korea	Asia	1
Lithuania	Europe	1
Luxembourg	Europe	1
Madagascar	Africa	1
Malaysia	Asia	1
Malta	Europe	1
Mexico	North America	2
Mongolia	Asia	1
Morocco	Africa	1
Myanmar	Asia	1
Netherlands	Europe	1
New Zealand	Oceania	1
Nicaragua	North America	1
Nigeria	Africa	1
Pakistan	Asia	1
Papua New Guinea	Oceania	1
Paraguay	South America	1
Peru	South America	1
Philippines	Asia	3
Poland	Europe	4
Portugal	Europe	4
Rwanda	Africa	1
Serbia	Europe	1
Singapore	Asia	1
South Africa	Africa	1
South Sudan	Africa	1
Spain	Europe	4
Sri Lanka	Asia	1
Sweden	Europe	1
Switzerland	Europe	2
Tanzania	Africa	1
Thailand	Asia	1
Timor-Leste	Asia	1
Tonga	Oceania	1
United Kingdom	Europe	3
United States*	North America	10
Uruguay	South America	1
Total		133

== See also ==
- Cardinals created by John Paul II
- Cardinals created by Benedict XVI
- Cardinals created by Francis
- Cardinal electors in the 2013 conclave
- List of current cardinals
