= Cardinals created by Francis =

Catholic appointments from 2014 to 2024

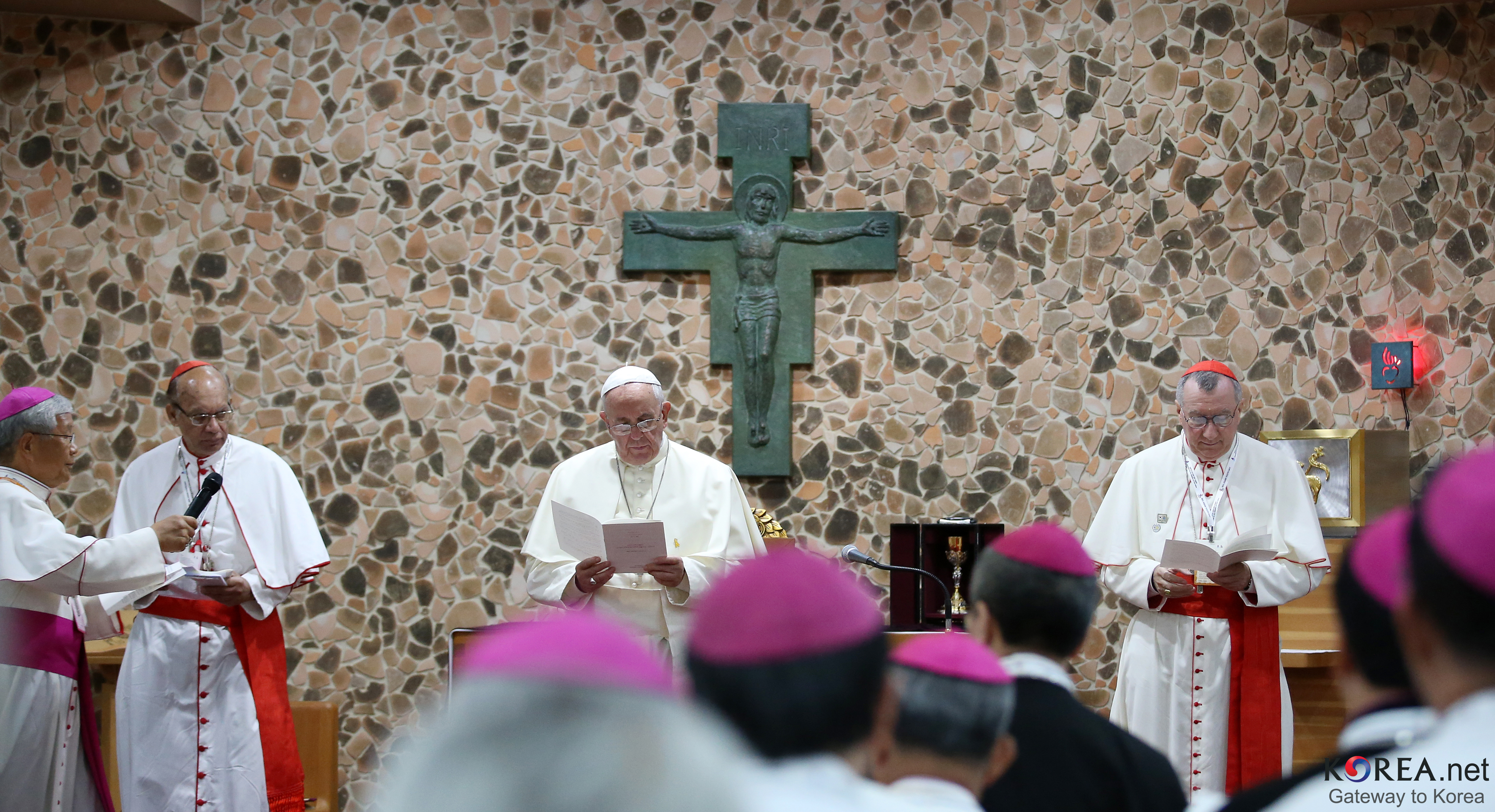
Pope Francis with Cardinals, 2014

Pope Francis (r. 2013–2025) created cardinals at ten consistories held at roughly annual intervals beginning in 2014 and for the last time on 7 December 2024. The cardinals created by Francis include 163 cardinals from 76 countries, 25 of which had never been represented in the College of Cardinals. (Note: Countries first represented among cardinals created by Francis, by consistory, with those represented in the College for the first time in italics: 2014: Argentina, Brazil, Burkina Faso, Canada, Chile, Côte d'Ivoire, Germany, Haiti, Italy, Nicaragua, Philippines, St. Lucia, South Korea, Spain, United Kingdom (15); 2015: Cape Verde, Colombia, Ethiopia, Mexico, Mozambique, Myanmar, New Zealand, Panama, Thailand, Tonga, Uruguay, Vietnam (12); 2016: Albania, Bangladesh, Belgium, Brazil, Central African Republic, Lesotho, Malaysia, Mauritius, Papua New Guinea, United States of America, Venezuela (11); 2017: El Salvador, Laos, Mali, Sweden (4); 2018: Bolivia, Iraq, Japan, Malta, Madagascar, Pakistan, Peru, Poland (8); 2019: Cuba, Democratic Republic of the Congo, Guatemala, Indonesia, Lithuania, Luxembourg, Morocco (7); 2020: Brunei, Rwanda (2); 2022: East Timor, France, Ghana, India, Mongolia, Nigeria, Paraguay, Singapore (8); 2023: South Africa, South Sudan, Switzerland, Tanzania; 2024: Algeria, Australia, Ecuador, Iran, Serbia) His appointments include the first Scandinavian since the Reformation, the first from Goa since an episcopal see was established there in 1533, the first from Latin America's indigenous peoples, the first from India's Dalit community, and the first active head of a religious congregation. He also appointed Cardinal Robert Francis Prevost in 2023, who later became Pope Leo XIV following Francis's death in April 2025.

Following the 2024 consistory, 110 of the cardinal electors had been appointed by Francis, 24 by Pope Benedict XVI, and 6 by Pope John Paul II. Each of Francis's consistories increased the number of cardinal electors from at or less than the set limit of 120 (Note: The number of electors has been at or below 120 before each of Francis's consistories: 2014 106; 2015 110; 2016 108; 2017 116; 2018 114; 2019 118; 2020 119; 2022 116; 2023 119; 2024 120) to a number higher than 120, as high as 140 in 2024, surpassing the record 135 set by Pope John Paul II in 2001 and 2003. Since 2 June 2023, two-thirds of the cardinal electors have been cardinals created by Francis. The December 2024 consistory increased that to about 79%, and 81% of the electors who participated in the 2025 papal conclave were created by Francis.

Francis shifted membership in the College of Cardinals away from Europe. The conclave that chose his successor was the first where Europeans did not account for a majority of electors, instead only making up 40% of them.

== Cardinal electors ==
Francis's consistories all brought the number of cardinal electors above the maximum of 120 introduced by Pope Paul VI, reaching between 121 and 140 electors, and remaining higher than 120 for over a year following the 2023 consistory. His predecessors had also exceeded the 120 limit on several occasions: Paul VI himself had increased the number of cardinal electors to 134 in 1969, before he introduced the 120 limit in 1975. (Note: In 1971, when Paul VI instituted an age limit of 80 for cardinals to participate in electing a pope, the number of cardinal electors fell below 120 again.) Pope John Paul II brought the number as high as 135 in 2001 and 2003, while Pope Benedict XVI's highest was 125 in 2012.

Francis's first four consistories increased the number of electors above 120 modestly for short periods: to 122 in 2014 for less than a month, (Note: The February 2014 consistory brought the number of cardinal electors to 122, but the 80th birthday of Cardinal Jean-Baptiste Phạm Minh Mẫn and the death of Cardinal José da Cruz Policarpo reduced the number to 120 in less than a month.) to 125 in 2015 for two months, (Note: The February 2015 consistory increased the number to 125, but the 80th birthdays of Cardinals Antonios Naguib and Justin Francis Rigali, the announcement on 20 March that Cardinal Keith O'Brien would no longer participate in a conclave, and the deaths of Cardinals Jean-Claude Turcotte and Francis George reduced the number of cardinal electors to 120 on 19 April, just two months after the consistory.) to 121 in 2016 for two weeks, (Note: The November 2016 consistory resulted in 121 electors, which fell to 120 with the 80th birthday of Cardinal Théodore-Adrien Sarr at the end of the month.) and to 121 in 2017 for ten weeks. (Note: The June 2017 consistory brought the number of cardinal electors to 121, and it declined to 120 when Cardinal Carlo Caffarra died ten weeks later on 6 September.)

In the June 2018 consistory, Francis again increased the number of cardinal electors to 125, and the count only fell to 120 after ten months. The October 2019 consistory increased the number of electors to 128. The 80th birthdays of four electors reduced that number to 124 in two weeks, but almost a year passed before the number of cardinal electors fell to 120 on 29 September 2020. The November 2020 consistory raised the number of electors to 128 again, but their number returned to 120 a little more quickly than after the previous consistory, on 7 November 2021. (Note: After the 2020 consistory, the number of electors exceeded 120 for 11 months and 9 days, from 28 November 2020 to 7 November 2021.) The August 2022 consistory raised the number of cardinal electors to 132, with the 80th birthdays of electors set to reduce that figure to 120 in little more than a year, (Note: The cardinal electors who reach their 80th birthdays following the 2022 consistory are: Gregorio Rosa Chávez on 3 September 2022, Rubén Salazar Gómez on 22 September 2022, Giuseppe Bertello on 1 October 2022, Gianfranco Ravasi on 18 October 2022, André Vingt-Trois on 7 November 2022, Óscar Rodríguez Maradiaga on 29 December 2022, Angelo Bagnasco on 14 January 2023, Domenico Calcagno on 3 February 2023, Dominik Duka on 26 April 2023, Crescenzio Sepe on 2 June 2023, and Giuseppe Versaldi on 30 July 2023.) shortened by the death of Richard Baawobr in November 2022 to 11 months.

The September 2023 consistory raised the number of cardinal electors to 137, a record at the time; it offered the possibility that the number of electors would exceed 120 until Oswald Gracias turned 80 on 24 December 2024, but the number fell to 120 with the death of Miguel Ángel Ayuso Guixot on 25 November 2024. After Francis created 20 electors on 7 December 2024, the number of cardinal electors was 140, a new record high. The number of cardinal-electors only fell to 120 on 15 April 2026, with the 80th birthday of Fernando Filoni.

At the time of the 2025 conclave, held on 7–8 May 2025 after the death of Pope Francis, there were 135 cardinal electors, marking the first time since the promulgation of Universi Dominici gregis that the number of cardinal-electors went above 120. The general congregations of the College of Cardinals allowed all cardinal electors to participate in the conclave. (Note: Cardinal Giovanni Angelo Becciu was under 80 years old before the 2025 conclave, but resigned the rights and privileges of the cardinal in 2020, and later himself confirmed that he would not participate in the conclave in accordance with the instructions of Pope Francis.) The absence of two cardinal electors due to health reasons, (Note: Cardinals Antonio Cañizares Llovera and John Njue) left 133 cardinal electors participating at that conclave, which elected Cardinal Robert Francis Prevost, one of the cardinals created by Francis, who took the name Pope Leo XIV.

== 22 February 2014 ==
On 31 October 2013, Pope Francis announced plans to name new cardinals in a consistory on 22 February 2014. In December 2013, he said that rumors that he might name a woman cardinal were not to be taken seriously. He announced the names of 19 new cardinals on 12 January 2014. Sixteen were under the age of 80, eligible to vote in papal conclaves. Observers attempting to interpret Francis' approach to naming cardinals noted the absence of certain names, including the heads of the dioceses of Venice and Turin and the Vatican Librarian and Archivist. Others noted a preference for clerics with pastoral experience and only a single theologian, Müller. John L. Allen said the choices made the February meeting the "Consistory of the Periphery", noting the "broad global distribution" of the new cardinals. Of the nomination of the archbishop of Perugia rather than those of more prestigious dioceses like Turin and Venice, La Stampa said: "Any career planners in the Church who had the path from the seminary to the cardinalship set out very clearly in their minds will have to think again."

Pope Francis sent a letter to each cardinal-designate that said:

The cardinalship does not imply promotion; it is neither an honour nor a decoration; it is simply a service that requires you to broaden your gaze and open your hearts.... Therefore I ask you, please, to receive this designation with a simple and humble heart. And, while you must do so with pleasure and joy, ensure that this sentiment is far from any expression of worldliness or from any form of celebration contrary to the evangelical spirit of austerity, sobriety and poverty.

Those made cardinal at the consistory were:

No.	Name	Title when named cardinal	Country
1.	Pietro Parolin (b. 1955)	Secretary of State	Italy
2.	Lorenzo Baldisseri (b. 1940)	Secretary General of the Synod of Bishops	Italy
3.	Gerhard Ludwig Müller (b. 1947)	Prefect of the Congregation for the Doctrine of the Faith	Germany
4.	Beniamino Stella (b. 1941)	Prefect of the Congregation for the Clergy	Italy
5.	Vincent Gerard Nichols (b. 1945)	Archbishop of Westminster	United Kingdom
6.	Leopoldo José Brenes Solórzano (b. 1949)	Archbishop of Managua	Nicaragua
7.	Gérald Cyprien Lacroix, I.S.P.X. (b. 1957)	Archbishop of Quebec	Canada
8.	Jean-Pierre Kutwa (b. 1945)	Archbishop of Abidjan	Ivory Coast
9.	Orani João Tempesta, O.Cist. (b. 1950)	Archbishop of São Sebastião do Rio de Janeiro	Brazil
10.	Gualtiero Bassetti (b. 1942)	Archbishop of Perugia-Città della Pieve	Italy
11.	Mario Aurelio Poli (b. 1947)	Archbishop of Buenos Aires	Argentina
12.	Andrew Yeom Soo-jung (b. 1943)	Archbishop of Seoul	South Korea
13.	Ricardo Ezzati Andrello, S.D.B. (b. 1942)	Archbishop of Santiago de Chile	Chile
14.	Philippe Nakellentuba Ouédraogo (b. 1945)	Archbishop of Ouagadougou	Burkina Faso
15.	Orlando Beltrán Quevedo, O.M.I. (b. 1939)	Archbishop of Cotabato	Philippines
16.	Chibly Langlois (b. 1958)	Bishop of Les Cayes	Haiti
17.	Loris Francesco Capovilla (1915–2016)	Prelate Emeritus of Loreto	Italy
18.	Fernando Sebastián Aguilar, C.M.F. (1929–2019)	Archbishop Emeritus of Pamplona y Tudela	Spain
19.	Kelvin Edward Felix (1933–2024)	Archbishop Emeritus of Castries	St. Lucia

Pope emeritus Benedict XVI attended the consistory. He doffed his zucchetto when Pope Francis came down the nave of St. Peter's Basilica to greet him, and took a seat in a row with several cardinals using a chair the same as theirs. Loris Francesco Capovilla was granted a dispensation and did not attend the consistory.

Though a cardinal who is not an ordinary—typically an official of the Roman Curia—is normally assigned the rank of cardinal deacon, Parolin was made a cardinal priest, as is customary in the case of the Holy See's secretary of state.

Prior to this consistory, there were 106 cardinals under the age of 80 and eligible to participate in the election of a pope, and the addition of 16 new cardinals under age 80 brought the total to 122, although another 10 were due to turn 80 in the remainder of 2014. Because the maximum number of cardinals allowed to participate in a papal conclave is set at 120, the number of cardinals below 80 is usually limited to 120, although that limit has occasionally been exceeded. The appointments brought the total number of cardinals to 218. (Note: 207 cardinals at 2013 conclave minus 1 cardinal elected pope (Bergoglio) minus 7 cardinals who died before the 2014 consistory (Antonetti, Nagy, Pimenta, Tonini, Mazombwe, Bartolucci, Carles Gordó) plus 19 newly-appointed cardinals.)

== 14 February 2015 ==
On 11 December 2014, the Vatican announced that new cardinals would be created at a consistory on 14 February 2015. On 4 January 2015, Pope Francis announced the names of 20 cardinals-designate, including 15 who were under the age of 80. Vatican spokesman Rev. Federico Lombardi said the list "confirms that the pope doesn't feel tied to the traditional 'cardinal sees'", like Turin and Venice, "which reflected historic reasons in various countries. Instead we have various nominations of archbishops or bishops of sees in the past that wouldn't have had a cardinal." The selections continued the pattern Pope Francis established the previous year, showing a "preference for diocesan bishops" and for the Southern Hemisphere. Of those under the age of 80, only one is a member of the Curia (Mamberti); three are bishops rather than archbishops; four are the first cardinals from their countries (Cape Verde, Myanmar, Panama, Tonga) and others from a diocese that has not had one for decades (Agrigento, Italy, not since 1786; Ancona, Italy, not in more than a century; Montevideo, Uruguay, not since 1979; Valladolid, Spain, not since 1919) or never had one (Morelia, Mexico). Nine have been elected by their peers as president of a national or regional episcopal conference. These appointments brought the number of cardinal electors to 125, while two electors would turn 80 in April. The total number of cardinals reached 227 after the consistory. (Note: 218 cardinals at previous consistory minus 11 cardinals who died before the 2015 consistory (Policarpo, Delly, Cé, Lourdusamy, Agré, Marchisano, Clancy, Szoka, Angelini, Mejía, Becker) plus 20 newly-appointed cardinals.)

On 23 January 2015, Pope Francis advised each nominee how to respond to his appointment: "Accept it with humility. Only do so in a way that in these celebrations there does not creep in a spirit of worldliness that intoxicates more than grappa on an empty stomach, disorienting and separating one from the cross of Christ."

The cardinals were invited to a consistory on 12–13 February devoted to presenting a preliminary plan for the reform of the Roman Curia to the entire College of Cardinals. Nineteen of the twenty cardinals-designate attended along with 148 of the 207 cardinals.

No.	Name	Title when named cardinal	Country
1.	Dominique Mamberti (b. 1952)	Prefect of the Supreme Tribunal of the Apostolic Signatura	France
2.	Manuel José Macário do Nascimento Clemente (b. 1948)	Patriarch of Lisbon	Portugal
3.	Berhaneyesus Demerew Souraphiel, C.M. (b. 1948)	Archbishop of Addis Abeba	Ethiopia
4.	John Atcherley Dew (b. 1948)	Archbishop of Wellington	New Zealand
5.	Edoardo Menichelli (1939–2025)	Archbishop of Ancona-Osimo	Italy
6.	Pierre Nguyễn Văn Nhơn (b. 1938)	Archbishop of Hanoi	Vietnam
7.	Alberto Suárez Inda (b. 1939)	Archbishop of Morelia	Mexico
8.	Charles Maung Bo, S.D.B. (b. 1948)	Archbishop of Yangon	Myanmar
9.	Francis Xavier Kriengsak Kovitvanit (b. 1949)	Archbishop of Bangkok	Thailand
10.	Francesco Montenegro (b. 1946)	Archbishop of Agrigento	Italy
11.	Daniel Fernando Sturla Berhouet, S.D.B. (b. 1959)	Archbishop of Montevideo	Uruguay
12.	Ricardo Blázquez Pérez (b. 1942)	Archbishop of Valladolid	Spain
13.	José Luis Lacunza Maestrojuán, O.A.R. (b. 1944)	Bishop of David	Panama
14.	Arlindo Gomes Furtado (b. 1949)	Bishop of Santiago de Cabo Verde	Cape Verde
15.	Soane Patita Paini Mafi (b. 1961)	Bishop of Tonga	Tonga
16.	José de Jesús Pimiento Rodríguez (1919–2019)	Archbishop Emeritus of Manizales	Colombia
17.	Luigi De Magistris (1926–2022)	Pro-Major Penitentiary Emeritus	Italy
18.	Karl-Josef Rauber (1934–2023)	Apostolic Nuncio (retired)	Germany
19.	Luis Héctor Villalba (b. 1934)	Archbishop Emeritus of Tucumán	Argentina
20.	Júlio Duarte Langa (1927–2026)	Bishop Emeritus of Xai-Xai	Mozambique

Pope emeritus Benedict XVI again attended the consistory and was greeted by Pope Francis before and after the ceremony. The only new cardinal unable to attend was Archbishop José de Jesús Pimiento Rodríguez, whose health prevented him from traveling to Rome.

== 19 November 2016 ==
On 9 October 2016, the Pope announced that he planned to create new cardinals at a consistory on 19 November 2016, including 13 cardinals under the age of 80 and four over the age of 80. His selections continued to demonstrate his preference for the peripheries and places not previously represented in the College of Cardinals. Several are the first named cardinals from their countries. Of those who are under the age of 80, only Farrell is a member of the Roman Curia. In choosing Simoni, Francis named his first cardinal who was not a bishop; Simoni, who was one of the appointments over age 80, received a papal dispensation from the requirement of episcopal consecration. The appointments brought the total number of cardinals to 228 and the number of cardinal electors to 121. Zenari is the first active apostolic nuncio made a cardinal in the modern era.

Asked a year later at a meeting with Jesuits in Bangladesh why he named a cardinal from "a nation where there is such a small Christian community" (about 600,000, of which about 400,000 are Catholic), Francis said:

Naming the cardinals, I tried to look at small Churches, those that grow in the peripheries, at the edges. Not to give consolation to those Churches, but to launch a clear message: the small Churches that grow in the periphery and are without ancient Catholic traditions today must speak to the universal Church, to the whole Church. I clearly feel that they have something to teach us.

No.	Name	Title when named cardinal	Country
1.	Mario Zenari (b. 1946)	Apostolic Nuncio to Syria	Italy
2.	Dieudonné Nzapalainga, C.S.Sp. (b. 1967)	Archbishop of Bangui	Central African Republic
3.	Carlos Osoro Sierra (b. 1945)	Archbishop of Madrid	Spain
4.	Sérgio da Rocha (b. 1959)	Archbishop of Brasília	Brazil
5.	Blase Joseph Cupich (b. 1949)	Archbishop of Chicago	United States
6.	Patrick D'Rozario, C.S.C. (b. 1943)	Archbishop of Dhaka	Bangladesh
7.	Baltazar Enrique Porras Cardozo (b. 1944)	Archbishop of Mérida	Venezuela
8.	Jozef De Kesel (b. 1947)	Archbishop of Mechelen-Brussels	Belgium
9.	Maurice Piat, C.S.Sp. (b. 1941)	Bishop of Port-Louis	Mauritius
10.	Kevin Joseph Farrell (b. 1947)	Prefect of the Dicastery for the Laity, Family and Life	United States
11.	Carlos Aguiar Retes (b. 1950)	Archbishop of Tlalnepantla	Mexico
12.	John Ribat, M.S.C. (b. 1957)	Archbishop of Port Moresby	Papua New Guinea
13.	Joseph William Tobin, C.Ss.R. (b. 1952)	Archbishop of Indianapolis (Note: Tobin was appointed Archbishop of Newark on 7 November 2016, but was not installed there until 6 January 2017. He was nevertheless identified as Archbishop of Newark in the consistory service booklet and on the day following the consistory by L'Osservatore Romano.)	United States
14.	Anthony Soter Fernandez (1932–2020)	Archbishop Emeritus of Kuala Lumpur	Malaysia
15.	Renato Corti (1936–2020)	Bishop Emeritus of Novara	Italy
16.	Sebastian Koto Khoarai, O.M.I. (1929–2021)	Bishop Emeritus of Mohale's Hoek	Lesotho
17.	Ernest Simoni (b. 1928)	Priest from the Archdiocese of Shkodrë-Pult	Albania

All the new cardinals attended the consistory on 19 November, except for Mosotho Bishop Khoarai, who was 87 and unable to travel. For the first time since his retirement, Pope emeritus Benedict XVI did not attend. The new cardinals were given the rank of cardinal priest except for Zenari, Farrell, and Simoni, who were made cardinal deacons. Cardinal Nzapalainga became the youngest member of the College of Cardinals and the first born after the Second Vatican Council. Following the consistory, Pope Francis and the 16 new cardinals present visited the Pope emeritus as a group at his residence in Mater Ecclesiae Monastery and received his blessing.

== 28 June 2017 ==
On 21 May 2017, Pope Francis announced a consistory for the elevation of five new cardinals on 28 June. He adhered to his established pattern of appointing cardinals from the peripheries, including the first cardinals from El Salvador, Laos, Mali, and Sweden, the last of those also the first cardinal from Scandinavia. All five are under the age of 80. According to the National Catholic Reporter, Gregorio Rosa Chávez is "believed to be the first auxiliary bishop to have been made a cardinal in at least the modern era." It has also been claimed that Rosa is the first parish pastor to be named cardinal in decades. With these new cardinals, the number of cardinal electors reached 121 and the total number of cardinals amounted to 225. (Note: 228 cardinals at previous consistory minus 8 cardinals who died before the 2017 consistory (Arns, Agustoni, Connell, Vlk, Keeler, Nicora, Husar, Dias) plus 5 newly-appointed cardinals.)

No.	Name	Title when named cardinal	Country
1.	Jean Zerbo (b. 1943)	Archbishop of Bamako	Mali
2.	Juan José Omella i Omella (b. 1946)	Archbishop of Barcelona	Spain
3.	Anders Arborelius, O.C.D. (b. 1949)	Bishop of Stockholm	Sweden
4.	Louis-Marie Ling Mangkhanekhoun, I.V.D. (b. 1944)	Apostolic Vicar of Paksé	Laos
5.	Gregorio Rosa Chávez (b. 1942)	Auxiliary Bishop of San Salvador	El Salvador

Following the consistory on 28 June, Pope Francis and the new cardinals visited Pope emeritus Benedict XVI, who did not attend the ceremony.

== 28 June 2018 ==
On 20 May 2018, Pope Francis announced a consistory for the elevation of fourteen new cardinals on 29 June, which was later changed to 28 June. The list of new cardinals included 11 young enough to participate in a papal election. Those named were an international group, as is typical of Francis, including prelates from Pakistan, Japan, and Madagascar, countries unrepresented in the College since 1994, 2007, and 2010, respectively. He also named two members of the Roman Curia, an official of the papal household, and another of the Diocese of Rome. Ticona Porco, of Quechuan background, became the first Latin American cardinal of indigenous origin. With this consistory Francis again raised the number of cardinal electors to 125. The number of electors declined to 120 on 27 April 2019. The total number of cardinals reached 226 after the consistory. (Note: 225 cardinals at previous consistory minus 13 cardinals who died before the 2018 consistory (Meisner, Tettamanzi, Murphy-O'Connor, Caffarra, De Paolis, Vidal, Panafieu, Lanza di Montezemolo, Law, Lehmann, O'Brien, Castrillón Hoyos, Obando Bravo) plus 14 newly-appointed cardinals.)

No.	Name	Title when named cardinal	Country
1.	Louis Raphael I Sako (b. 1948)	Patriarch of Babylon of the Chaldeans	Iraq
2.	Luis Francisco Ladaria Ferrer, S.J. (b. 1944)	Prefect of the Congregation for the Doctrine of the Faith	Spain
3.	Angelo De Donatis (b. 1954)	Vicar General of Rome	Italy
4.	Giovanni Angelo Becciu (b. 1948)	Substitute of the Secretariat of State	Italy
5.	Konrad Krajewski (b. 1963)	Almoner of the Office of Papal Charities	Poland
6.	Joseph Coutts (b. 1945)	Archbishop of Karachi	Pakistan
7.	António Augusto dos Santos Marto (b. 1947)	Bishop of Leiria-Fátima	Portugal
8.	Pedro Ricardo Barreto Jimeno, S.J. (b. 1944)	Archbishop of Huancayo	Peru
9.	Désiré Tsarahazana (b. 1954)	Archbishop of Toamasina	Madagascar
10.	Giuseppe Petrocchi (b. 1948)	Archbishop of L'Aquila	Italy
11.	Thomas Aquino Manyo Maeda (b. 1949)	Archbishop of Osaka	Japan
12.	Sergio Obeso Rivera (1931–2019)	Archbishop Emeritus of Xalapa	Mexico
13.	Toribio Ticona Porco (b. 1937)	Prelate Emeritus of Corocoro	Bolivia
14.	Aquilino Bocos Merino, C.M.F. (b. 1938)	Superior General Emeritus of the Claretians (Note: Aquilino Bocos Merino was consecrated a bishop on 16 June 2018.)	Spain

At the consistory, Sako addressed Francis on behalf of the new cardinals, thanking him for the concern he has shown for the small, persecuted Catholic population of the Middle East. Francis warned the new cardinals against "palace intrigues that take place, even in curial offices". Sako did not receive the same red biretta as the others, but a rounder red "shash" traditionally worn by cardinals of the Chaldean Catholic Church. Francis and the new cardinals visited Pope emeritus Benedict XVI following the consistory.

== 5 October 2019 ==
On 1 September 2019, Pope Francis announced that he would hold a consistory to create thirteen new cardinals on 5 October, including ten who are young enough to participate in a papal conclave. This brought the number of cardinal electors to 128, eight more than the limit set by Pope Paul VI, but often ignored. The number of cardinal electors returned to 120 on 29 September 2020. The total number of cardinals reached 225 after the consistory. (Note: 226 cardinals at previous consistory minus 13 cardinals who died before the 2019 consistory (Tauran, Sebastián Aguilar, Danneels, Sfeir, Sgreccia, Sardi, Estepa Llaurens, Ortega y Alamino, Obeso Rivera, Silvestrini, Pimiento Rodríguez, Etchegaray, Levada) minus 1 cardinal who resigned (McCarrick) plus 13 newly-appointed cardinals.)

The individuals named represent the international character of the Church, including prelates from Guatemala and Indonesia, as well as those with expertise on the care of migrants and relations with Islam; those from Luxembourg and Morocco were the first cardinals from those countries. Three of those named are Curial officials, including the only new cardinal of this consistory not already a bishop, Czerny, who was consecrated a bishop the day before the consistory.

No.	Name	Title when named cardinal	Country
1.	Miguel Ángel Ayuso Guixot M.C.C.J. (1952–2024)	President of the Pontifical Council for Interreligious Dialogue	Spain
2.	José Tolentino Calaça de Mendonça (b. 1965)	Librarian & Archivist of the Roman Church	Portugal
3.	Ignatius Suharyo Hardjoatmodjo (b. 1950)	Archbishop of Jakarta	Indonesia
4.	Juan de la Caridad García Rodríguez (b. 1948)	Archbishop of San Cristóbal de la Habana	Cuba
5.	Fridolin Ambongo Besungu O.F.M. Cap. (b. 1960)	Archbishop of Kinshasa	Democratic Republic of the Congo
6.	Jean-Claude Hollerich S.J. (b. 1958)	Archbishop of Luxembourg	Luxembourg
7.	Álvaro Leonel Ramazzini Imeri (b. 1947)	Bishop of Huehuetenango	Guatemala
8.	Matteo Maria Zuppi (b. 1955)	Archbishop of Bologna	Italy
9.	Cristóbal López Romero S.D.B. (b. 1952)	Archbishop of Rabat	Morocco (Note: When compiling statistics, the Holy See associates Curial officials with their citizenship, but for an ordinary it uses the country in which his see in located.)
10.	Michael Czerny S.J. (b. 1946)	Undersecretary of the Migrant and Refugee Section of the Dicastery for Promoting Integral Human Development (Note: Michael Czerny was consecrated a bishop on 4 October 2019.)	Canada
11.	Michael Louis Fitzgerald M.Afr. (b. 1937)	Apostolic Nuncio (retired)	United Kingdom
12.	Sigitas Tamkevicius S.J. (b. 1938)	Archbishop Emeritus of Kaunas	Lithuania
13.	Eugenio Dal Corso P.S.D.P. (1939–2024)	Bishop Emeritus of Benguela	Angola

Following the consistory, Pope Francis and the new cardinals visited Pope emeritus Benedict XVI, who spoke to them briefly and gave them his blessing.

== 28 November 2020 ==
On 25 October 2020, Pope Francis announced he would create thirteen new cardinals, nine of them young enough to be cardinal electors, at a consistory scheduled for 28 November. The list included the first cardinals from Brunei and Rwanda; the first Conventual Franciscan to become a cardinal in almost 160 years (Gambetti); (Note: The last was Fr. Antonio Maria Panebianco, elevated on 27 September 1861 by Pope Pius IX.) the first African American cardinal (Gregory); the first Archbishop of Capiz to be made a cardinal; and the first Archbishop of Siena to be made a cardinal since 1801. (Note: The last cardinal archbishop of Siena was Antonio Felice Zondadari, who was elevated on 23 February 1801 by Pope Pius VII.) Feroci, a parish priest, was consecrated a bishop on 15 November. Gambetti's service as custos ended on 12 November. Cantalamessa was granted a dispensation from the requirement that he be consecrated a bishop.

No.	Name	Title when named cardinal	Country
1.	Mario Grech (b. 1957)	Secretary General of the Synod of Bishops	Malta
2.	Marcello Semeraro (b. 1947)	Prefect of the Congregation for the Causes of Saints	Italy
3.	Antoine Kambanda (b. 1958)	Archbishop of Kigali	Rwanda
4.	Wilton Daniel Gregory (b. 1947)	Archbishop of Washington	United States
5.	Jose Fuerte Advincula (b. 1952)	Archbishop of Capiz	Philippines
6.	Celestino Aós Braco O.F.M.Cap. (b. 1945)	Archbishop of Santiago	Chile
7.	Cornelius Sim (1951–2021)	Apostolic Vicar of Brunei Darussalam	Brunei
8.	Augusto Paolo Lojudice (b. 1964)	Archbishop of Siena-Colle di Val d'Elsa-Montalcino	Italy
9.	Mauro Gambetti O.F.M. Conv. (b. 1965)	Custos emeritus of the Sacred Convent of Assisi (Note: Mauro Gambetti was consecrated a bishop on 22 November 2020.)	Italy
10.	Felipe Arizmendi Esquivel (b. 1940)	Bishop Emeritus of San Cristóbal de Las Casas	Mexico
11.	Silvano Maria Tomasi C.S. (b. 1940)	Apostolic nuncio (retired)	Italy
12.	Raniero Cantalamessa O.F.M. Cap. (b. 1934)	Preacher for the Papal Household	Italy
13.	Enrico Feroci (b. 1940)	Parish priest for Santa Maria del Divino Amore a Castel di Leva (Note: Enrico Feroci was consecrated a bishop on 15 November 2020.)	Italy

Because of COVID-19 pandemic travel restrictions, two of the new cardinals, Jose Advincula and Cornelius Sim, did not journey to Rome and instead viewed the ceremony via a digital link along with other cardinals unable to travel. The other eleven cardinals-designate self-quarantined at the Vatican's Casa Santa Marta in the days preceding the ceremony. A hundred other guests were allowed in the basilica. Everyone but Pope Francis and the servers wore masks. The kiss of peace normally exchanged between the new cardinals and the other cardinals in attendance was omitted, as were the customary receptions following the ceremony. Francis and the eleven new cardinals in attendance visited Pope emeritus Benedict after the ceremony. This consistory brought the number of cardinal electors to 128 and the total number of cardinals to 229. Of the 128 electors, 73 had been appointed by Francis, 39 by Pope Benedict XVI, and 16 by Pope John Paul II. The number of electors fell to 120 on 7 November 2021 when Angelo Scola turned 80.

== 27 August 2022 ==
On 29 May 2022, Pope Francis announced he would create twenty-one new cardinals, sixteen of them young enough to be cardinal electors, at a consistory scheduled for 27 August. Among the new electors, there are three Curial officials, natives of South Korea, Spain, and the United Kingdom; only three other Europeans, one of them a missionary in Mongolia; two each from India and Brazil; and others from East Timor, Ghana, Nigeria, Paraguay, Singapore, and the United States. The appointments include the first cardinals from East Timor, Mongolia, Paraguay, and Singapore, the first ordinary of Goa since its erection in the 16th century, the first from India's Dalit caste. and the first from the Amazon region. Two are suffragan bishops, Cantoni and McElroy, whose metropolitan archbishops are not cardinals. Of two not yet bishops, Frezza received his episcopal consecration on 23 July and Ghirlanda received a dispensation from the requirement that all cardinals be bishops.

In June, Pope Francis granted the request of one of those he had named, Lucas Van Looy, Bishop emeritus of Ghent, that he not be made a cardinal. Van Looy cited renewed criticism of his handling of charges of sexual abuse by priests when he was Bishop of Ghent.

The consistory coincides with a meeting of the entire College of Cardinals previously scheduled for 29–30 August to consider the new apostolic constitution, Praedicate evangelium, which took effect on 5 June.

No.	Name	Title when named cardinal	Country
1.	Arthur Roche (b. 1950)	Prefect of the Dicastery for Divine Worship and the Discipline of the Sacraments	United Kingdom
2.	Lazarus You Heung-sik (b. 1951)	Prefect of the Dicastery for the Clergy	South Korea
3.	Fernando Vérgez Alzaga L.C. (b. 1945)	President of the Pontifical Commission and Governorate for the Vatican City State	Spain
4.	Jean-Marc Aveline (b. 1958)	Archbishop of Marseille	France
5.	Peter Ebere Okpaleke (b. 1963)	Bishop of Ekwulobia	Nigeria
6.	Leonardo Ulrich Steiner O.F.M. (b. 1950)	Archbishop of Manaus	Brazil
7.	Filipe Neri Ferrão (b. 1953)	Archbishop of Goa and Daman	India
8.	Robert Walter McElroy (b. 1954)	Bishop of San Diego	United States
9.	Virgílio do Carmo da Silva S.D.B. (b. 1967)	Archbishop of Díli	East Timor
10.	Oscar Cantoni (b. 1950)	Bishop of Como	Italy
11.	Anthony Poola (b. 1961)	Archbishop of Hyderabad	India
12.	Paulo Cezar Costa (b. 1967)	Archbishop of Brasília	Brazil
13.	Richard Kuuia Baawobr M.Afr. (1959–2022)	Bishop of Wa	Ghana
14.	William Goh (b. 1957)	Archbishop of Singapore	Singapore
15.	Adalberto Martínez Flores (b. 1951)	Archbishop of Asunción	Paraguay
16.	Giorgio Marengo I.M.C. (b. 1974)	Apostolic Prefect of Ulaanbaatar	Mongolia
17.	Jorge Enrique Jiménez Carvajal C.J.M. (b. 1942)	Archbishop Emeritus of Cartagena	Colombia
18.	Arrigo Miglio (b. 1942)	Archbishop Emeritus of Cagliari	Italy
19.	Gianfranco Ghirlanda S.J. (b. 1942)	Rector Emeritus of the Pontifical Gregorian University	Italy
20.	Fortunato Frezza (b. 1942)	Canon of the Chapter of Saint Peter's (Note: Fortunato Frezza was consecrated a bishop on 23 July 2022.)	Italy

On 27 August, Pope Francis created twenty cardinals, fifteen assigned to the rank of cardinal priests and five cardinal deacons. All of them attended the consistory except Baawobr who had traveled to Rome but was taken ill and hospitalized the day before the consistory. Among the cardinals in attendance was Angelo Becciu, invited by Pope Francis to attend this consistory despite having resigned the privileges of a cardinal. After the ceremony, the pope and the nineteen new cardinals in attendance visited Pope emeritus Benedict XVI at his residence. The nineteen then held the customary receptions, which had been suspended in 2020 because of the COVID-19 pandemic. Three of the new cardinals were the three youngest cardinals: Costa at 55, do Carmo da Silva at 54, and Marengo at 48.

Following the 2022 consistory, 83 of the cardinal electors had been appointed by Francis, 38 by Pope Benedict XVI, and 11 by Pope John Paul II.

== 30 September 2023 ==
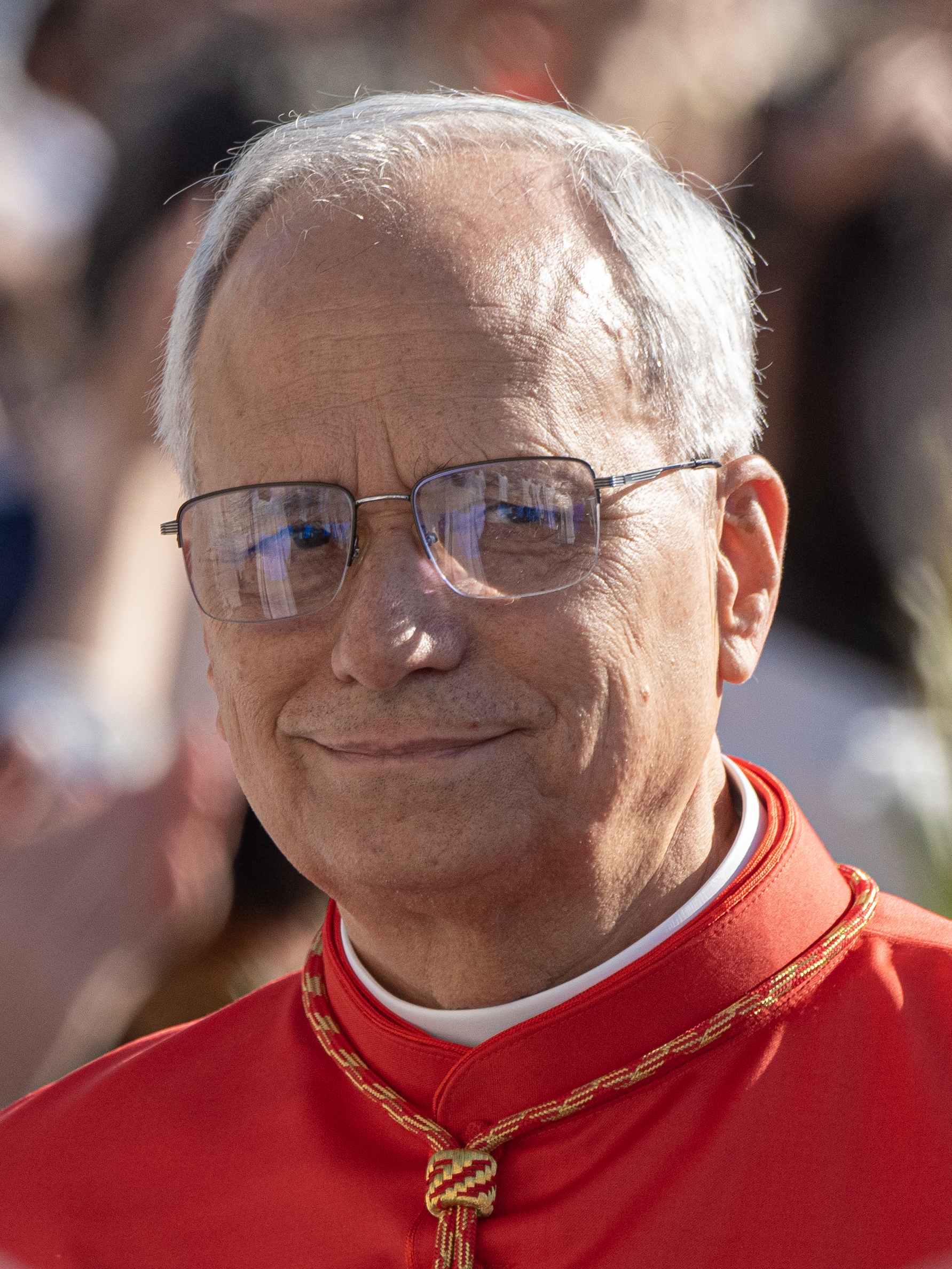
Robert Francis Prevost (born 1955), made a cardinal on 30 September 2023 and elected Pope Leo XIV on 8 May 2025

On 9 July 2023, Pope Francis announced that he would create twenty-one new cardinals, eighteen of them young enough to be cardinal electors, at a consistory scheduled for 30 September. New electors included the first cardinal from South Sudan, three Curial officials, two papal nuncios, the Latin Patriarch of Jerusalem, both a coadjutor archbishop and an auxiliary bishop, and the superior of the Salesians. Ángel Fernández Artime is the first active head of a religious congregation named a cardinal. As he had once before in 2016, Francis looked to the diplomatic corps of the Holy See, naming two active apostolic nuncios. Francis also named three men over the age of eighty who are unable to vote in a future conclave. Aguiar's appointment while an auxiliary of Lisbon was called "a genuine novelty" and some speculated Francis would move him to the Roman Curia shortly. In the event, Pope Francis named him bishop of Setúbal on 21 September 2023.

Those Francis named included the future Pope Leo XIV, Robert Francis Prevost.

Luis Pascual Dri and Ángel Fernández Artime were granted dispensations from the requirement that they receive episcopal consecration before becoming cardinals. Artime is the first cardinal elector to receive such a dispensation since Roberto Tucci spent two months as a potential cardinal elector in 2001.

The consistory followed Pope Francis's visit to Marseille on 23 September by a week and preceded the opening of the Synod of Bishops on the subject of synodality by four days.

No.	Name	Title when named cardinal	Country
1.	Robert Francis Prevost O.S.A. (b. 1955) (Note: Elected as Pope Leo XIV (2025–present))	Prefect of the Dicastery for Bishops	United States
2.	Claudio Gugerotti (b. 1955)	Prefect of the Dicastery for the Eastern Churches	Italy
3.	Víctor Manuel Fernández (b. 1962)	Prefect of the Dicastery for the Doctrine of the Faith	Argentina
4.	Emil Paul Tscherrig (1947–2026)	Apostolic Nuncio to Italy	Switzerland
5.	Christophe Pierre (b. 1946)	Apostolic Nuncio to the United States	France
6.	Pierbattista Pizzaballa O.F.M. (b. 1965)	Latin Patriarch of Jerusalem	Jerusalem (Note: The Holy See, in its statistical report of the College of Cardinals, lists "Jerusalem" as Pizzaballa's.)
7.	Stephen Brislin (b. 1956)	Archbishop of Cape Town	South Africa
8.	Ángel Sixto Rossi S.J. (b. 1958)	Archbishop of Córdoba	Argentina
9.	Luis José Rueda Aparicio (b. 1962)	Archbishop of Bogotá	Colombia
10.	Grzegorz Ryś (b. 1964)	Archbishop of Łódź	Poland
11.	Stephen Ameyu Martin Mulla (b. 1964)	Archbishop of Juba	South Sudan
12.	José Cobo Cano (b. 1965)	Archbishop of Madrid	Spain
13.	Protase Rugambwa (b. 1960)	Coadjutor Archbishop of Tabora	Tanzania
14.	Sebastian Francis (b. 1951)	Bishop of Penang	Malaysia
15.	Stephen Chow Sau-yan S.J. (b. 1959)	Bishop of Hong Kong	Hong Kong (China) (Note: Hong Kong is a special administrative region of China.)
16.	François-Xavier Bustillo O.F.M. Conv. (b. 1968)	Bishop of Ajaccio	France
17.	Américo Manuel Alves Aguiar (b. 1973)	Bishop-elect of Setúbal	Portugal
18.	Ángel Fernández Artime S.D.B. (b. 1960)	Rector Major of the Salesians	Spain
19.	Agostino Marchetto (b. 1940)	Apostolic Nuncio	Italy
20.	Diego Rafael Padrón Sánchez (b. 1939)	Archbishop Emeritus of Cumaná	Venezuela
21.	Luis Pascual Dri O.F.M. Cap. (1927–2025)	Confessor, Shrine of Our Lady of Pompei, Buenos Aires	Argentina

The ceremony was held outdoors on the parvis of St. Peter's Basilica. Of the new cardinals, Dri did not attend the consistory because of his health and age. He received his cardinal's regalia on 11 October 2023 from Archbishop Mirosław Adamczyk, Apostolic Nuncio to Argentina, at a ceremony in the cathedral of Buenos Aires.

As of the conclusion of the 2023 consistory, of the 99 cardinals appointed by Francis who would be eligible to participate as electors in a papal conclave, only 37 (38%) were European. Some 52% of the electors were Europeans at the 2013 conclave that elected Francis, but only 39% were Europeans as of 30 September 2023.

== 7 December 2024 ==
On 6 October 2024, Pope Francis announced he planned to create 21 cardinals on 8 December, a date that was later changed to 7 December, and their number later reduced to 20, and then returned to 21. Francis said: "Their provenance expresses the universality of the church, which continues to announce the merciful love of God to all men on earth." In a letter to those he named, Francis welcomed them to "the Roman clergy" and counseled them "to love more expansively", pray for discernment, and stay close to realities that "demand from you great compassion and mercy". He offered the title of "servant" in place of "eminence".

All but one of those announced were young enough to be cardinal electors, and that one, Acerbi, at the age of 99, is "likely the oldest man ever to be named a cardinal". Only two were Curial officials (Baggio and Koovakad), and two worked for the Diocese of Rome (Makrickas and Reina); four–after the list was modified on 4 November–were Italians (Baggio, Battaglia, Reina and Repole). Eleven were members of religious orders: three (originally four) Franciscans, two Dominicans, two Divine Word Missionaries, one Redemptorist, one Scalabrinian, and one Vincentian. When their names were announced, nine of the 21 were in Rome participating in the Synod on Synodality.

On 22 October 2024, the Holy See Press Office announced that Pope Francis accepted the request of Paskalis Bruno Syukur, Bishop of Bogor in Indonesia, to continue in his current mission and not be made a cardinal. On 4 November Francis added the name of Domenico Battaglia, Archbishop of Naples.

Koovakad received his episcopal consecration on 24 November. Baggio's was scheduled for 11 January 2025, while Radcliffe received a dispensation from the requirement.

The cardinals appear here in the sequence they were announced.

No.	Name	Title when named cardinal	Country
1.	Angelo Acerbi (b. 1925)	Apostolic Nuncio	Italy
2.	Carlos Gustavo Castillo Mattasoglio (b. 1950)	Archbishop of Lima	Peru
3.	Vicente Bokalic Iglic C.M. (b. 1952)	Archbishop of Santiago del Estero	Argentina
4.	Luis Cabrera Herrera O.F.M. (b. 1955)	Archbishop of Guayaquil	Ecuador
5.	Fernando Natalio Chomalí Garib (b. 1957)	Metropolitan Archbishop of Santiago de Chile	Chile
6.	Tarcisio Isao Kikuchi S.V.D. (b. 1958)	Archbishop of Tokyo	Japan
7.	Pablo Virgilio Siongco David (b. 1959)	Bishop of Kaloocan	Philippines
8.	Ladislav Nemet S.V.D. (b. 1956)	Metropolitan Archbishop of Belgrade	Serbia
9.	Jaime Spengler O.F.M. (b. 1960)	Archbishop of Porto Alegre	Brazil
10.	Ignace Bessi Dogbo (b. 1961)	Archbishop of Abidjan	Côte d'Ivoire
11.	Jean-Paul Vesco O.P. (b. 1962)	Archbishop of Algiers	Algeria
12.	Dominique Mathieu O.F.M. Conv (b. 1963)	Archbishop of Tehran–Isfahan	Iran
13.	Roberto Repole (b. 1967)	Archbishop of Turin	Italy
14.	Baldassare Reina (b. 1970)	Vicar General of His Holiness for the Diocese of Rome	Italy
15.	Frank Leo (b. 1971)	Archbishop of Toronto	Canada
16.	Rolandas Makrickas (b. 1972)	Coadjutor Archpriest of the Basilica di Santa Maria Maggiore	Lithuania
17.	Mykola Bychok C.Ss.R. (b. 1980)	Bishop of the Ukrainian Catholic Eparchy of Saints Peter and Paul of Melbourne	Australia
18.	Timothy Radcliffe O.P. (b. 1945)	Master Emeritus of the Order of Preachers	United Kingdom
19.	Fabio Baggio C.S. (b. 1965)	Under Secretary for Migrants and Refugees of the Dicastery for Promoting Integral Human Development	Italy
20.	George Koovakad (b. 1973)	Official in the Secretariat of State	India
21.	Domenico Battaglia (b. 1963)	Archbishop of Naples	Italy

At the consistory, with papal permission, the two Dominicans becoming cardinals, Radcliffe and Vesco, wore the white robes of their order rather than the red robes similar to the other cardinals. Two others wore the robes appropriate to their respective rites: Bychok of the Ukrainian Greek Catholic and Koovakad of the Syro-Malabar Catholic. In place of a biretta, Bychok received a black koukoulion with red piping and Koovakad a shash similar to the one given to Cardinal Sako in 2018. Acerbi gave the customary address to the pope on behalf of the new cardinals.

Following the 2024 consistory, 110 (79%) of the cardinal electors had been appointed by Francis, 24 (17%) by Pope Benedict XVI, and 6 (4%) by Pope John Paul II. Sixteen of the new cardinals were assigned to the order of cardinal priests; the five assigned to the order of cardinal deacons were Acerbi, Makrickas, Radcliffe, Baggio, and Koovakad. Bychok became the youngest member of the College of Cardinals at the age of 44. Ladislav Nemet was the first Serbian to join the College. Radcliffe was a rare instance of a non-bishop who might to serve as an elector, and in the event Radcliffe was the only non-bishop to participate in the 2025 conclave that elected Pope Leo XIV.

== See also ==
- Cardinals created by Benedict XVI (previous)
- Cardinals created by Leo XIV (successor)
- List of current cardinals
