= Alessandra Smerilli =

Italian economist and academic, religious sister, and Holy See official

Sister Alessandra Smerilli FMA
- Smerilli in 2019

Prefect of the Dicastery for Promoting Integral Human Development
- Incumbent
- Assumed office September 2026
- Preceded by: Cardinal Michael Czerny

Secretary of the Dicastery for Promoting Integral Human Development
- In office August 26, 2021 – April 23, 2022
- In office April 23, 2022 – September 2026
- Preceded by: Bruno Marie Duffé

Undersecretary of Faith and Development Sector of the Dicastery for Promoting Integral Human Development
- In office March 24, 2021 – August 26, 2021

Personal life
- Born: 14 November 1974 (age 52) Vasto, Italy
- Education: Roma Tre University, University of East Anglia, Pontifical Faculty of Educational Sciences Auxilium

Religious life
- Religion: Catholic
- Order: Salesian Sisters of Don Bosco
- Profession: Economist, professor, Curia official

Senior posting
- Awards: Order of the Star of Italy

Alessandra Smerilli, FMA (born 14 November 1974) is an Italian Catholic economist, academic, and religious sister who has been a member of the Salesian Sisters of Don Bosco, and currently serves as the Prefect of the Dicastery for Promoting Integral Human Development in the Roman Curia since September 2026, succeeding Cardinal Michael Czerny.

She is the first woman appointed as secretary of a dicastery, the second most senior official in the Curia department after the prefect, making her the highest-ranking female official at the time. Smerilli continued to serve as secretary until June 2026, when she succeeded Cardinal Czerny as Prefect of the same dicastery which became effective in September.

Smerilli holds a post-PhD (it. docente) degree in political economy and statistics from the Pontifical Faculty of Educational Sciences Auxilium.

== Biography ==
Alessandra Smerilli was born on 14 November 1974 in Vasto, Italy. In July 1993, she graduated from the Raffaele Mattioli Scientific High School there and later began her studies in economics.

Four years later, in 1997, she has entered the congregation of the Daughters of Mary Help of Christians and at the request of her superior continued her studies in economics.

Alessandra studied at the Faculty of Economics of the Roma Tre University and in July 2001, graduated with a degree in economics and commerce with specialization in political economy with full marks, honours and the right to publish the thesis.

In June 2006, she obtained a doctorate in political economy at the University of Rome "La Sapienza", and on 21 June 2014 received a PhD degree in economics from the School of Economics of the University of East Anglia in Norwich, UK.

Smerilli works at the Pontifical Faculty of Educational Sciences Auxilium as an extraordinary professor of political economy and statistics, and also as a member of the University's board of directors. She also teaches economics, ethics and finance at the Faculty of Philosophy of the Salesian Pontifical University and in the master's program in civil and non-profit economics at the University of Milan-Bicocca.

Since 2008, she has been a member of the Scientific and Organizational committees of the Social Weeks of Italian Catholics, and since 2013 the Secretary of this initiative. Additionally, she is a member of the Ethics Committees of the CHARIS consortium and also of the Banca Popolare Etica, and a founding member of the School of Civil Economics.

In early 2021 she was awarded the Order of the Star of Italy for her "academic achievements and commitment to the ethical principles in business and finance".

== Roman Curia ==
Smerilli was among the first group of women Pope Francis placed in senior leadership roles in the Roman Curia.

In 2018, she was an auditor at the 15th ordinary general assembly of the Synod of Bishops which took place in Vatican City from 3 to 28 October 2018 on the theme "Young people, faith and vocational discernment".

On 17 April 2019, Pope Francis appointed her a councilor of the Vatican City State. On 24 May 2019, he named her a consultant to the general secretariat of the Synod of Bishops.

Beginning in the spring of 2020, she coordinated the Economic Task Force of the Vatican COVID-19 Commission, an institution created by Pope Francis to express the Church's concern in the face of the COVID-19 pandemic and to propose answers to the socio-economic challenges of the future.

Smerilli is also a member of the Women for a New Renaissance a task force set up by the Minister for Equal Opportunities and the family of the Italian politician Elena Bonetti.

On 24 March 2021, Pope Francis appointed her the undersecretary for the Faith and Development Sector of the Dicastery for Promoting Integral Human Development. She was named the interim secretary on 26 August 2021, making her the first woman to hold the second-ranking position in a dicastery in the Roman Curia, and the highest ranking woman in the curia at the time. Her appointment as the Secretary of the Dicastery for Promoting Integral Human Development was made permanent on 23 April 2022. She was joined at comparable ranks by Raffaella Petrini who was appointed secretary general of the Pontifical Commission for Vatican City State in November 2021, and Simona Brambilla who was appointed Secretary of the Dicastery for Institutes of Consecrated Life and Societies of Apostolic Life in October 2023.

In September 2023 she was named a member of the Board of Directors of the Laudato Si' Center for Higher Education.

In 2024, she contributed the foreword to a publication of Caritas Internationalis entitled Equality, Encounter, Renewal: A Caritas commitment to the promotion of women's leadership and participation, based on the Holy Scriptures and Catholic Social Teaching values and principles.

On 11 February 2025, Pope Francis established the Commission for Donations to the Holy See (Commissio de Donationibus pro Sancta Sede) and appointed Smerilli one of its members. She was appointed prefect of the Dicastery for Promoting Integral Human Development by Pope Leo XIV in June 2026, effective in September.

== Publications ==
- Alessandra Smerilli (2003). Teoria economica e relazioni interpersonali. Roma: Università La Sapienza.
- Luigino Bruni; Alessandra Smerilli (2006). Le dinamiche della cooperazione: un modello evolutivo. Forlì: AICCON Working Paper.
- Alessandra Smerilli (2006). Comportamenti cooperativi e we-rationality. Roma: Università La Sapienza.
- Luca Correani; Giuseppe Garofalo; Fabio Sabatini (2007). Homo oeconomicus? Dinamiche imprenditoriali in laboratorio. Bologna: il Mulino.
- Luigino Bruni; Alessandra Smerilli (2008). Benedetta economia. Benedetto da Norcia e Francesco d'Assisi nella storia economica europea. Roma: Città Nuova Editrice. p. 120. ISBN 9788831101615.
- Luigino Bruni; Alessandra Smerilli (2010). La leggerezza del ferro. Un'introduzione alla teoria economica delle "organizzazioni a movente ideale". Milano: Vita e Pensiero. p. 144. ISBN 9788834318720.
- Alessandra Smerilli (2013). Suore. Roma: Città Nuova Editrice. p. 64.
- Luigino Bruni; Alessandra Smerilli (2014). The Economics of Values-Based Organizations: an Introduction. Oxford: Routledge. p. 150. ISBN 9781317703594.
- Luigino Bruni; Alessandra Smerilli (2014). L'altra metà dell'economia. Roma: Città Nuova Editrice. p. 160. ISBN 9788831101820.
- Alessandra Smerilli (2017). Carismi, economia, profezia. La gestione delle opere e delle risorse. Roma: Editrice Rogate. ISBN 9788880754589.
- Alessandra Smerilli (2018). Laura Badaracchi (ed.). Pillole di economia civile e del ben-vivere. Roma: Ecra - Edizioni del Credito Cooperativo. p. 160. ISBN 9788865582657.
- Sergio Massironi; Alessandra Smerilli (2019). L'adesso di Dio: i giovani e il cambiamento della Chiesa. Milano: Vita e Pensiero. p. 125. ISBN 9788834339985.
- Alessandra Smerilli (2020). Donna Economia. Dalla crisi a una stagione di speranza. Cinisello Balsamo: Edizioni San Paolo. p. 192. ISBN 9788892221451.

== Awards ==
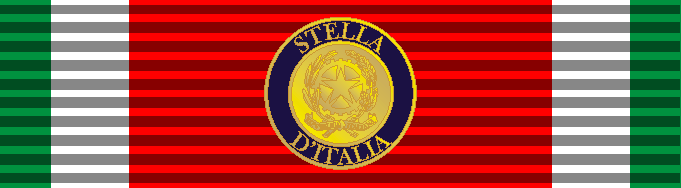

On 28 May 2020, she was awarded (receiving in early 2021) the Order of the Star of Italy.
