= Pontifical Council for the Pastoral Care of Migrants and Itinerant People =

The Pontifical Council for the Pastoral Care of Migrants and Itinerant People (Latin: Pontificium Consilium de Spirituali Migrantium atque Itinerantium Cura) was a pontifical council of the Roman Curia. The council, established by Pope John Paul II on 28 June 1988, was dedicated to the spiritual welfare of migrant and itinerant people.

The last President of the council was Cardinal Antonio Maria Vegliò, who was appointed by Pope Benedict XVI on 28 February 2009. The last Secretary was Bishop Joseph Kalathiparambil, who was appointed by Pope Benedict XVI on February 22, 2011, and who had until then been serving as the Bishop of the Calicut, India.

Effective 1 January 2017, the work of the council was assumed by the Dicastery for Promoting Integral Human Development.

== Role ==
According to article 149 of the apostolic constitution on the Roman Curia, Pastor bonus, promulgated by Pope John Paul II on 28 June 1988: "The Pontifical Council for the Pastoral Care of Migrants and Itinerant People brings the pastoral concern of the Church to bear on the special needs of those who have been forced to leave their native land or who do not have one. It also sees to it that these matters are considered with the attention they deserve." Articles 150 and 151 also number refugees, exiles, nomads, circus workers, sailors, airport or airplane workers, and Christians taking pilgrimages as being under the council's care.

== History ==
During the nineteenth century, the subject of populations subject to relocation was under the jurisdiction of the Congregation for the Propagation of the Faith, with the Office for the Spiritual Care of Emigrants later replacing it. In 1952, within the Sacred Consistorial Congregation, Pope Pius XII founded the Superior Council for Emigrants and the General Secretariat for the Direction of the Apostolatus Maris; in 1958, the General Direction of the Apostleship of the Skies or the Air was also erected. Pope Paul VI founded the International Secretariat for the Direction of the Apostolatus Nomadum in the same dicastery in 1965.

In 1967, Pope Paul instituted the Office for the Pastoral Care of people who are part of the complex phenomenon known commonly as "Tourism" in the Congregation for the Clergy. On March 19, 1970, Paul condensed all sectors dealing with human mobility into the Pontifical Commission for the Spiritual Care of Migrants and Itinerants, in the motu proprio Apostolicae caritatis. The commission was made dependent on the Congregation for Bishops but this dependence was eventually terminated by Pastor bonus, which granted it the status of a pontifical council.

Effective 1 January 2017, the Dicastery for Promoting Integral Human Development took responsibility for the work of the council through its Migrants and Refugees Section.

== List of presidents ==
- Carlo Confalonieri (1970 - 1973)
- Emanuele Clarizio (1970 - 1986, pro-president)
- Bernardin Gantin (1984 - 1989)
- Giovanni Cheli (1986 - 1998, pro-president and later president)
- Stephen Fumio Hamao (1998 - 2006)
- Renato Martino (2006 - 2009)
- Antonio Maria Vegliò (2009 - 2016)
