= Zampini (surname) =

Zampini is an Italian surname. Notable people with the surname include:

- Augusto Zampini (born 1969), Argentine priest
- Barbara Zampini (born 1978), Argentine musician
- Carina Zampini (born 1975), Argentine actress
- Cassandra Zampini (born 1983), American visual artist
- Donato Zampini (1926–2007), Italian racing cyclist
- Fanny Zampini Salazar (1853–1931), Italian writer, editor, and lecturer
