= Michael Czerny =

Czech Canadian Catholic cardinal (born 1946)

His Eminence Michael Czerny CMG SJ
- Prefect Emeritus of the Dicastery for Promoting Integral Human Development
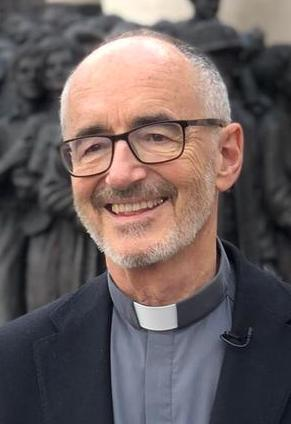
- Czerny in 2019
- Church: Latin Church
- Installed: 23 April 2022
- Term ended: 1 September 2026
- Predecessor: Peter Turkson
- Successor: Alessandra Smerilli (As Prefect); Fabio Baggio (As Pro Prefect)
- Other post: Cardinal Deacon of San Michele Arcangelo a Pietralata (2019–present)
- Previous posts: Titular Archbishop of Beneventum (2019); Under-Secretary of the Migrants and Refugees Section of the Dicastery for Promoting Integral Human Development (2016-2022)

Orders
- Ordination: 9 June 1973 by Thomas Benjamin Fulton
- Consecration: 4 October 2019 by Pope Francis
- Created cardinal: 5 October 2019 by Pope Francis
- Rank: Cardinal-Deacon

Personal details
- Born: Michael Felix Czerny; 18 July 1946 (age 80) Brno, Czechoslovakia
- Denomination: Catholic
- Education: Gonzaga University; University of Chicago
- Motto: Suscipe (Latin for 'Receive')

Styles of Michael Czerny
- Reference style: His Eminence
- Spoken style: Your Eminence
- Religious style: Cardinal
- Informal style: Cardinal

Ordination history of Michael Czerny
History
Episcopal consecration
- Principal consecrator: Pope Francis
- Co-consecrators: Pietro Parolin; Peter Turkson
Cardinalate
- Elevated by: Pope Francis

Michael Felix Czerny, CMG SJ (born 18 July 1946) is a Czech-born Canadian Catholic prelate who served as prefect of the Dicastery for Promoting Integral Human Development between 2022 and 2026. He was under secretary of the dicastery's Migrants and Refugees Section from 2017 to 2022. Pope Francis made him a cardinal in 2019.

A member of the Jesuits, Czerny has worked to promote social justice in Canada, Latin America, Africa, and Rome.

== Early years ==
Michael Czerny was born in Brno, Czechoslovakia, on 18 July 1946. His mother's family was Jewish converts to Catholicism. After the Germans occupied Czechoslovakia, his maternal grandparents and two of his mother's brothers were interned in Terezín, where his grandfather died. The others were moved to Auschwitz, and the brothers died in labor camps. Michael's mother, because she was Jewish, was forced into farm labor and then imprisoned for 20 months; his father was forced to farm labor for refusing to divorce her. His parents immigrated to Canada by ship in 1948, bringing Michael and his brother.

Following his 1963 graduation from Loyola High School in Montreal, Czerny joined the Jesuits on 14 August 1964. He did his novitiate in Guelph, Ontario, and then studied classics and philosophy at Gonzaga University in Spokane, Washington, earning his bachelor's degree in classics and philosophy in 1968. He taught for a year at Gonzaga High School in St. John's, he pursued further studies in theology in Chicago and at Regis College in Toronto. On 9 June 1973, he was ordained a priest for the Upper Canadian Province (now the Jesuit Province of Canada) in Willowdale, Ontario. He obtained his doctorate in interdisciplinary studies from the University of Chicago in 1978.

== Jesuit initiatives ==
Czerny co-founded the Jesuit Centre for Social Faith and Justice in Toronto in 1979, and he was the first director until 1989. In 1990–1991, following the murder of six Jesuits and others at the University of Central America in San Salvador, he assumed the director's role of the university's Institute for Human Rights (IDHUCA), a position that had been held by one of the murdered priests. He was also Vice-Rector for Social Outreach.

From 1992 to 2002, Czerny worked in the Social Justice Secretariat at the Jesuit General Curia in Rome. In 2002, he founded the African Jesuit AIDS Network and directed it until 2010. During these nine years, he initiated and coordinated efforts by Jesuits and others in nearly 30 countries of Sub-Saharan Africa to provide pastoral care, education, health services, social and spiritual support, and to fight stigma for victims of HIV/AIDS, and channelled resources from foreign sources. During that time, he also taught at Hekima University College in Nairobi. In 2009, he argued that condoms were ineffective in preventing the spread of HIV in Africa's general population, despite their success "outside Africa and amongst identifiable sub-groups (e.g. prostitutes, gay men)".

== Roman Curia ==
Czerny worked in Rome at the Pontifical Council for Justice and Peace, where he was the personal assistant to Cardinal Peter Turkson from 2010 to 2016. On 14 December 2016, Pope Francis appointed him under-secretary of the Migrants and Refugees Section of the Dicastery for Promoting Integral Human Development, effective 1 January 2017, along with Scalabrinian Father Fabio Baggio. Discussing his new responsibility, he called migration "one of the most important and urgent human phenomena of our times", adding: "There's hardly a place in the planet which is not touched by this phenomenon. Indeed, though many are not aware of it, there are more people moving in Russia and China today than in any other part of the world." Also in 2016, he commissioned Timothy Schmalz to create the Angels Unawares sculpture that depicts a boat carrying migrants and refugees wearing clothes that identify them with a variety of cultures and time periods. It was inaugurated in St. Peter's Square in the Vatican in 2019.

Francis named him a voting member of the October 2018 Synod of Bishops on Young People, Faith, and Vocational Discernment. In October 2018, Czerny said the rhetoric used to describe migration and refugee movements was misleading: "It's not a crisis. It's a series of mismanagements and poor policies and self-interested manipulations. The numbers that we're talking about, even on the total scale, are not at all that great."

On 4 May 2019, Czerny was appointed as one of two Special Secretaries for the October 2019 Synod of Bishops for the Pan-Amazon region by Pope Francis. At the press conference introducing the Synod's concluding document, he said the Church needs to learn to respect cultural differences: "Not to assume that the way I am or the way we are is definitive, is the norm, is the way it has to be ... differences have to be embraced". Asked to define what the synod's participants meant by synodality, he said: "Everyone had a sense of what it meant because we were doing it. Could we explain that in words... does it matter?" A few years before, in 2015, he wrote that there were "limitations and fragmentations" among the organizations of the Amazon before REPAM but the organization coordinated the work of the Catholic Church in the Amazon region and has worked to defend indigenous peoples and the environment.

=== Appointments as cardinal and prefect ===
On 1 September 2019, Pope Francis announced he would make Czerny a cardinal in the consistory of 5 October 2019. Czerny was surprised by the announcement, which he heard while he was in Guararema, Brazil, meeting with representatives of the popular movements to prepare for the synod. In accordance with the norm that all cardinals should be bishops, Francis consecrated Czerny a bishop on 4 October, the day before he was scheduled to become a cardinal, making him titular archbishop of Beneventum. The co-consecrators were Cardinals Pietro Parolin and Peter Turkson. As planned on 5 October, Pope Francis elevated him to become a cardinal, in the order of cardinal deacons. (Note: His coat of arms is composed of a green field evocative of Pope Francis' encyclical Laudato si', a gold boat carrying a family of four refugees, the seal of the Society of Jesus, and the word "suscipe", the word that opens the prayer in the Spiritual Exercises of Saint Ignatius Loyola: Suscipe, Domine, universam meam libertatem (“Take, Lord, all my liberty") and also evokes the Gospel command to "receive" the stranger. Czerny's pectoral cross, made by the Italian artist Domenico Pellegrino, is fashioned from the remains of a boat used by migrants to cross the Mediterranean Sea and reach the Italian island of Lampedusa.) He became Cardinal-Deacon of San Michele Arcangelo.

Czerny was named a member of the Congregation for the Evangelization of Peoples on 21 February 2020 and a member of the Pontifical Council for Interreligious Dialogue on 8 July 2020. Czerny was appointed a member of the jury of the Zayed Award for Human Fraternity in June 2021. In December 2021, in accepting the resignation of Cardinal Turkson as prefect of the Dicastery for Promoting Integral Human Development, Pope Francis named Czerny as temporary prefect effective from 1 January 2022. His interim status was removed and he was appointed to a five-year term as prefect of the Dicastery on 23 April 2022.

After the Russian invasion of Ukraine, Cardinal Czerny was sent by Pope Francis with humanitarian aid to Ukraine in March 2022, along with the papal almoner, Cardinal Konrad Krajewski. This mission, which involved several trips, and followed the pope's personal visit to the Russian Embassy to plead for peace, was part of a significant escalation of Vatican diplomatic efforts to bring an end to the violent invasion.

Czerny participated as a cardinal elector in the 2025 papal conclave that elected Pope Leo XIV. Ahead of the election, Czerny told The New York Times that "unity", a theme highlighted by some electors, "means reversal", stating, "If you ask me, 'How would you name the wrong track for the conclave?' I would say the idea that unity is the priority." He told the same newspaper, "I can think of some African cardinals – they make me shudder", explaining that some conservatives supported African candidates to further an agenda, and stating, "that’s why ... it’s so, so, so stupid to say things like Africa's time has come."

A 25-minute documentary film about Czerny premiered in Brno in 2025. It focused on his family background and the history of Catholics with Jewish ancestry.

== Honours ==
- Companion of the Order of St Michael and St George (CMG) (22 October 2025)

== Books ==
- Michael Czerny; Jamie Swift; Robert Ganton Clarke (1994). Getting Started on Social Analysis in Canada. Between The Lines. ISBN 9780921284857.
- Michael Czerny; Bénézet Bujo (2007). Aids in Africa: Theological Reflections. Paulines Publications Africa. ISBN 978-9966-081-87-2.
- Michael Czerny; Christian Barone (2021). Fraternità segno dei tempi. Il magistero sociale di Papa Francesco. Libreria Editrice Vaticana. ISBN 978-88-266-0663-7.

== See also ==
- Cardinals created by Francis

== Notes ==
Catholic Church titles
| Preceded by Konrad Krajewski | — TITULAR — Archbishop of Beneventum; 2019–2019 | Succeeded by Mitja Leskovar |
| New office | Under Secretary of the Dicastery for Promoting Integral Human Development; 2016–present | Succeeded by Fabio Baggio |
| Preceded by Javier Lozano Barragán | Cardinal-Deacon of San Michele Arcangelo a Pietralata; 2019–present | Incumbent |
| Preceded by Peter Turkson | Prefect of the Dicastery for Promoting Integral Human Development; 2022–2026 | Incumbent |
