= Augusto Zampini =

Augusto Zampini-Davies (born 25 July 1969) is an Argentine priest of the Catholic Church who served in a senior position in the Roman Curia in 2020–2021.

== Biography ==
Zampini was born in Buenos Aires on 25 July 1969. He studied law at the Universidad Católica Argentina and worked from 1993 to 1997 as a lawyer for the Central Bank of Argentina and the international law firm Baker & McKenzie. He decided to become a priest when he was 27. On 22 October 2004, he was ordained a priest of the Diocese of San Isidro. After studying moral theology, he obtained a master's degree in international development from the University of Bath and a doctorate in theology from Roehampton University, London. He did post-doctoral research at the Margaret Beaufort Institute of the University of Cambridge in 2013–2014. As an expert in moral theology with an emphasis on economics and environmental ethics, he then taught at the university level in both Argentina and the United Kingdom.

He served as an assistant priest and chaplain in different parishes and institutions in Argentina, many of them located in the poorest neighbourhoods of Greater Buenos Aires. He served at Holy Apostles, Archdiocese of Westminster, London.

He joined the staff of the Dicastery for Promoting Integral Human Development in 2016 at the invitation of its prefect, Cardinal Peter Turkson, and on 9 April 2020 Pope Francis named him its Deputy Secretary. He served as one of eight expert advisors who, at the Synod on the Amazon in 2019, created the synod's working document from months of consultations with Catholics in the region. He commented on the process:

Living in Rome in a very clerical environment, personally for me it was a refreshing surprise to see that they had no fear in saying whatever they want. They talked, particularly the women. That was a surprise. Very, very powerful statements from women. It was quite refreshing.

When conservative prelates criticized the experts' work, he said:

Listening is not easy. But if you want to listen, this is what happens. You might listen to things that you are not comfortable with — but you have to listen.... It's not a doctrinal document. It's the very thorough outcome of the process of consultation, based on this idea of listening in order to discern before deciding what to do. When you listen to God, when you listen to the people of the Amazon, when you listen to the Earth, this is what you get.

He was also appointed adjunct Secretary of the Vatican COVID-19 Commission, when Pope Francis instituted it on 20 March 2020 and tasked it with proposing solutions to the socio-economic problems that the coronavirus pandemic would bring with it. At the time, Zampini was the only Argentine that Pope Francis named to a Curial position during his papacy.

His service in these Curial positions ended on 26 August 2021 after he asked to be allowed to return to his home diocese.
