= Fabio Baggio =

Italian Catholic cardinal

His Eminence Fabio Baggio CS
- Pro-Prefect of the Dicastery for Promoting Integral Human Development
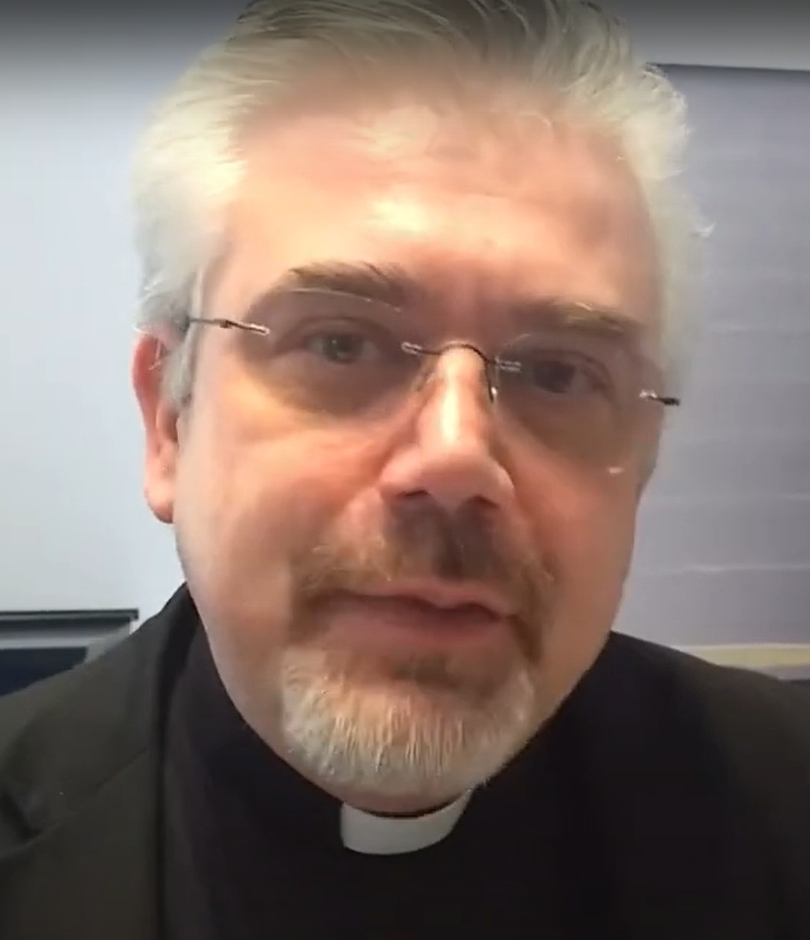
- Baggio in 2019
- Church: Catholic Church
- Installed: 1 January 2017
- Other post: Cardinal-Deacon of San Filippo Neri in Eurosia (2024–)

Orders
- Ordination: 11 July 1992
- Consecration: 11 January 2025 by Michael Czerny
- Created cardinal: 7 December 2024 by Pope Francis
- Rank: Cardinal-Deacon

Personal details
- Born: 15 January 1965 (age 61) Bassano del Grappa, Italy
- Motto: Notas mihi fecisti vias vitae (Latin for 'You have made known to me the paths of life')
- Coat of arms

Fabio Baggio CS (born 15 January 1965) is an Italian Catholic cardinal. Since 2017, he has served as one of the Holy See's officials in charge of migrants and refugees. He has spent his career as a missionary, including eight years in Latin America and eight years in the Philippines. He supports improved legal entrance for migrants and refugees.

Pope Francis made him a cardinal on 7 December 2024.

== Biography ==
Fabio Baggio was born on 15 January 1965 in Bassano del Grappa in the Italian province of Vicenza. He joined the Scalabrian Missionaries in 1976, studied at their seminary in his native city, and took his perpetual vows in 1991. He was ordained a priest in 1992.

He earned a bachelor's degree in theology and then a licentiate and a doctorate in church history from the Pontifical Gregorian University in 1998. From 1995 to 1997, while a pastor in Santiago de Chile, he was a councillor to the Migrations Commission of the Episcopal Conference of Chile. From 1997 to 2002, he was director of the Migrations Department of the Archdiocese of Buenos Aires, taking on in 1999 additional responsibilities for evangelization on behalf of the Pontifical Missions of Argentina.

From 1999 to 2010, he taught at the Universidad del Salvador in Buenos Aires, the Institute of Theology of São Paulo, the University of Manila, and the Maryhill School of Theology in Quezon City, Philippines, where he was director of the Scalabrini Migration Center and of the Asian Pacific Migration Journal.

Beginning in 2000, he taught as a visiting professor at the Scalabrini International Migration Institute within the Faculty of Theology of the Pontifical Urbaniana University in Rome, becoming a full professor and its president in 2013.

Beginning on 1 January 2017, he worked as one of the undersecretaries of the Migrants and Refugees Section of the Dicastery for Promoting Integral Human Development alongside Michael Czerny. On 26 August 2021, he was named one of three members of the Vatican's COVID-19 commission. On 23 April 2022, Pope Francis named him the sole undersecretary of his section and enlarged his responsibilities to include special projects.

In 2019, he described his section's message:

So many people who arrive from outside, from cultures different from our own, from expressions of Christian or Catholic life different from ours, are a source of enrichment, and not of impoverishment, for us. Thus, instead of creating the fear of an invasion, which one hears many speak about, the facts should make us want to encounter them. If it was truly my brother or sister, would I close the door?

During a visit to Albania in July 2019, he said that interreligious dialogue could help resolve the ethical challenges posed by migration, that universal principles could be found within religions to develop a shared ethical response to the problems of social integration posed by population movements.

On 31 October 2024, Pope Francis appointed Baggio as titular bishop of Urusi and gave him the personal title of archbishop. His episcopal consecration took place in Bassano del Grappa on 11 January 2025.

On 7 December 2024, Pope Francis made Baggio a cardinal, assigning him as Cardinal-Deacon of San Filippo Neri in Eurosia.

Baggio was an elector in the 2025 papal conclave which elected Pope Leo XIV.

In 2026, Baggio was appointed Pro-Prefect of the Dicastery for Promoting Integral Human Development.

== See also ==
- Cardinals created by Francis
