= African Jesuit AIDS Network =

Network of organizations

- Formation: June 21, 2002; 24 years ago
- Founder: Michael Czerny
- Founded at: Nairobi, Kenya
- Location: 20 countries (2017)
- Website: ajan.africa

African Jesuit AIDS Network (AJAN) is a network of organizations that fight against HIV/AIDS, created on June 21, 2002, by Jesuits from Africa and Madagascar. Based in Nairobi, it operates in several countries around the world, being present in 20 countries in 2017. It has on several occasions championed the funding deficit to fight against VIH/AIDS in Africa. It is one of the entities in the Catholic Church that handles about 25% of AIDS patients worldwide and can reach 100% of Africa in remote areas, according to the Vatican studies.

Michael Czerny SJ founded and headed the entity from 2002 to 2010. The reason for the organization's creation was "to encourage the Jesuits in Africa and Madagascar to find and develop projects" related to the fight against AIDS. These entities can be groups of people infected with the virus or affected by the virus, including those who fight against stigmatization and discrimination, who promote responsibility and prevention, and who are sensitive to the culture, faith, and spirituality of the people. Czerny argues that limiting the fight against AIDS to condom use is not enough, and conveys that the selfishness seen in the pandemic is alien to African values, and is a subconscious reaction against imposed, foreign values. At the end of the 2010s, Paterne Mombe, an AIDS expert in Africa trained in Biology at Burkina Faso, headed the network. He decided to take up the fight against AIDS after helping AIDS patients from Uganda. "It is not about telling them to use the condom or not to do it, but to form a critical conscience so that they can make an informed choice and choose what they think is best for them," he said in an interview.
