= San Filippo Neri in Eurosia =

- Church of Saint Philip Neri in Eurosia
- Chiesa di San Filippo Neri in Eurosia
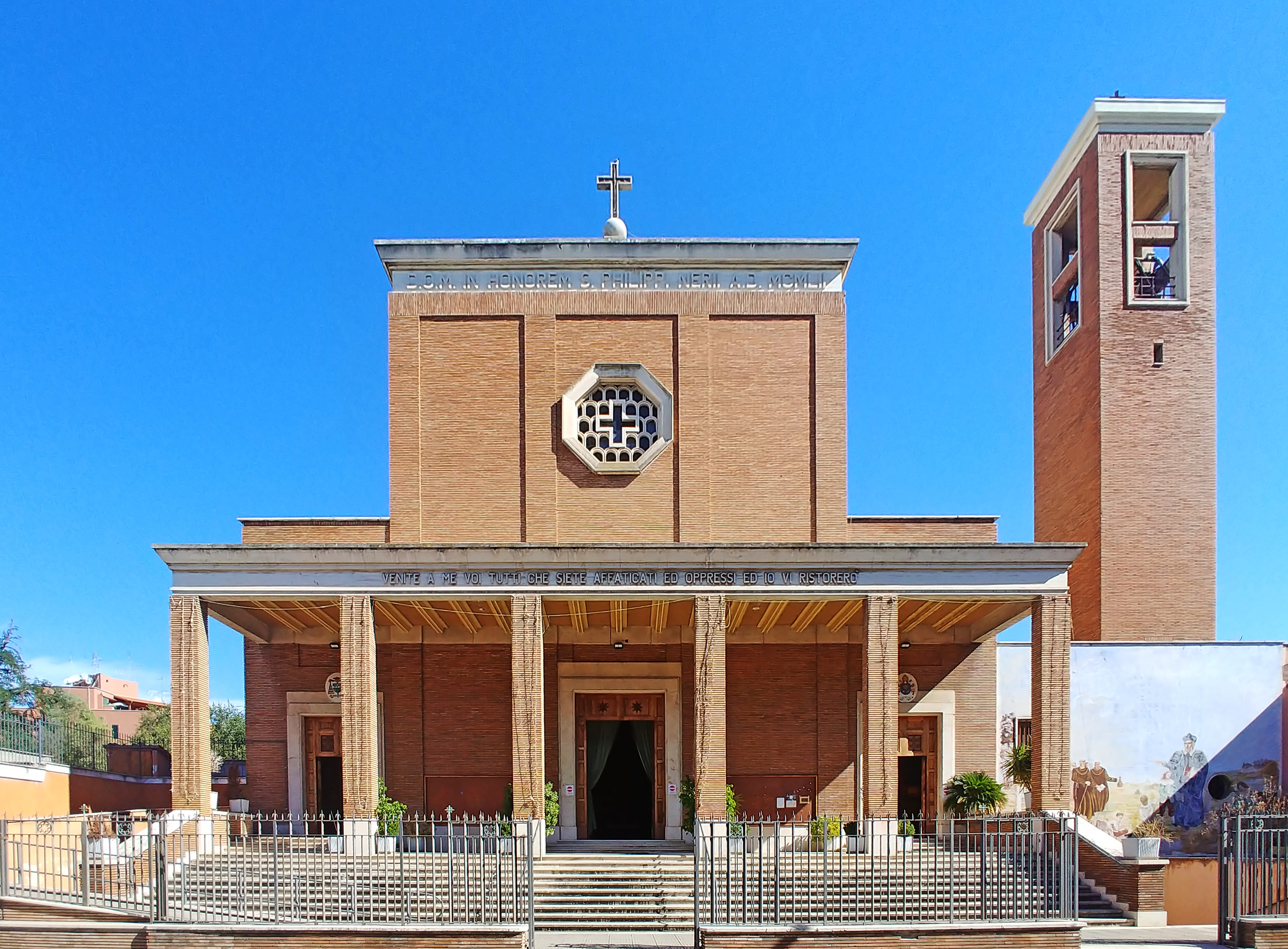

- Location within Rome
- 41°51′39″N 12°29′34″E
- Location: Via delle Sette Chiese 103, Ostiense, Rome
- Country: Italy
- Language: Italian
- Denomination: Catholic
- Tradition: Roman Rite
- Website: sanfilippoineurosia.it

History
- Status: titular church
- Dedication: Philip Neri
- Consecrated: 1956

Architecture
- Functional status: active
- Architect: Pier Luigi Baruffi
- Architectural type: Romanesque Revival
- Completed: 1956

Administration
- Diocese: Rome

San Filippo Neri in Eurosia is a 20th-century parochial church and titular church in southern Rome, dedicated to Saint Philip Neri (1515–1595).

== History ==
San Filippo Neri in Eurosia was built in 1952–55. The title "in Eurosia" refers to the nearby church of Santi Isidoro e Eurosia.

On 7 June 1967, it was made a titular church to be held by a cardinal-deacon. Pope John Paul II visited on 23 February 1986.

Cardinal-Protectors

- Alfred Bengsch (1967–1979)
- Attilio Nicora (2003–2017)
- Fabio Baggio (2024–)
