= Vatican COVID-19 Commission =

Vatican institution to aid against the COVID-19 pandemic

The Vatican COVID-19 Commission is an institution created by Pope Francis to express the Church’s solicitude facing the COVID-19 pandemic, and propose responses to the potential socio-economic challenges deriving from it. On 20 March 2020, Pope Francis asked the Dicastery for Promoting Integral Human Development (DPIHD) to create a Commission to "prepare the future" through actions of support to local churches to save human lives and help the poorest, and through the analysis and reflection on the socioeconomic challenges that have risen with this crisis and the proposal of criteria to face them.

The body reports directly to the Pope, and it is directed by Cardinal Peter K.A. Turkson, Prefect of the Dicastery for Promoting Integral Human Development; the Secretary, Mons. Bruno-Marie Duffé; and Fr Augusto Zampini, Adjunct Secretary.

In an interview with Vatican News, Cardinal Peter Turkson explained the nature and the background of the Commission:

The Pope is convinced that we are living through an epochal change, and he is reflecting on what will follow the crisis, on the economic and social consequences of the pandemic, on what we will have to face, and above all on how the Church can offer itself as a safe point of reference to the world lost in the face of an unexpected event. […] The Pope has asked us for concreteness and creativity, scientific approach and imagination, global thinking and the ability to understand local needs.

== Working groups and objectives ==
The Vatican COVID-19 Commission involves the activity of five working groups, each with specific objectives, which were presented to the Pope on 27 March 2020:

- Working Group 1: Acting now for the future
- Working Group 2: Looking to the future with creativity
- Working Group 3: Communicating hope
- Working Group 4: Seeking common dialogue and reflections
- Working Group 5: Supporting to care.

Working Group 2, "Looking to the future with creativity", works through four taskforces: security, health, economy, and ecology; each with their own coordinator. The Commission regularly publishes a newsletter which collects and summarises the results of its research and scientific reflection on these four disciplines. In addition, they work transversally around four thematic pillars: 1) the dignity of work and the jobs of the future; 2) new structures for the common good, 3) governance, peace and security for a global solidarity; 4) balancing social systems with the ecosystem.

The Vatican COVID-19 Commission has elaborated various materials, reflections and messages, for instance the Catechesis offered by Pope Francis during his General Audiences in August and September 2020, gathered in the book To Heal the World, Catechesis on the pandemic, the book Life after the pandemic and the e-book based on the Rosary Crisis and Health, among others.
