= Domenico Battaglia (cardinal) =

Italian archbishop

His Eminence Domenico Battaglia
- Cardinal, Archbishop of Naples
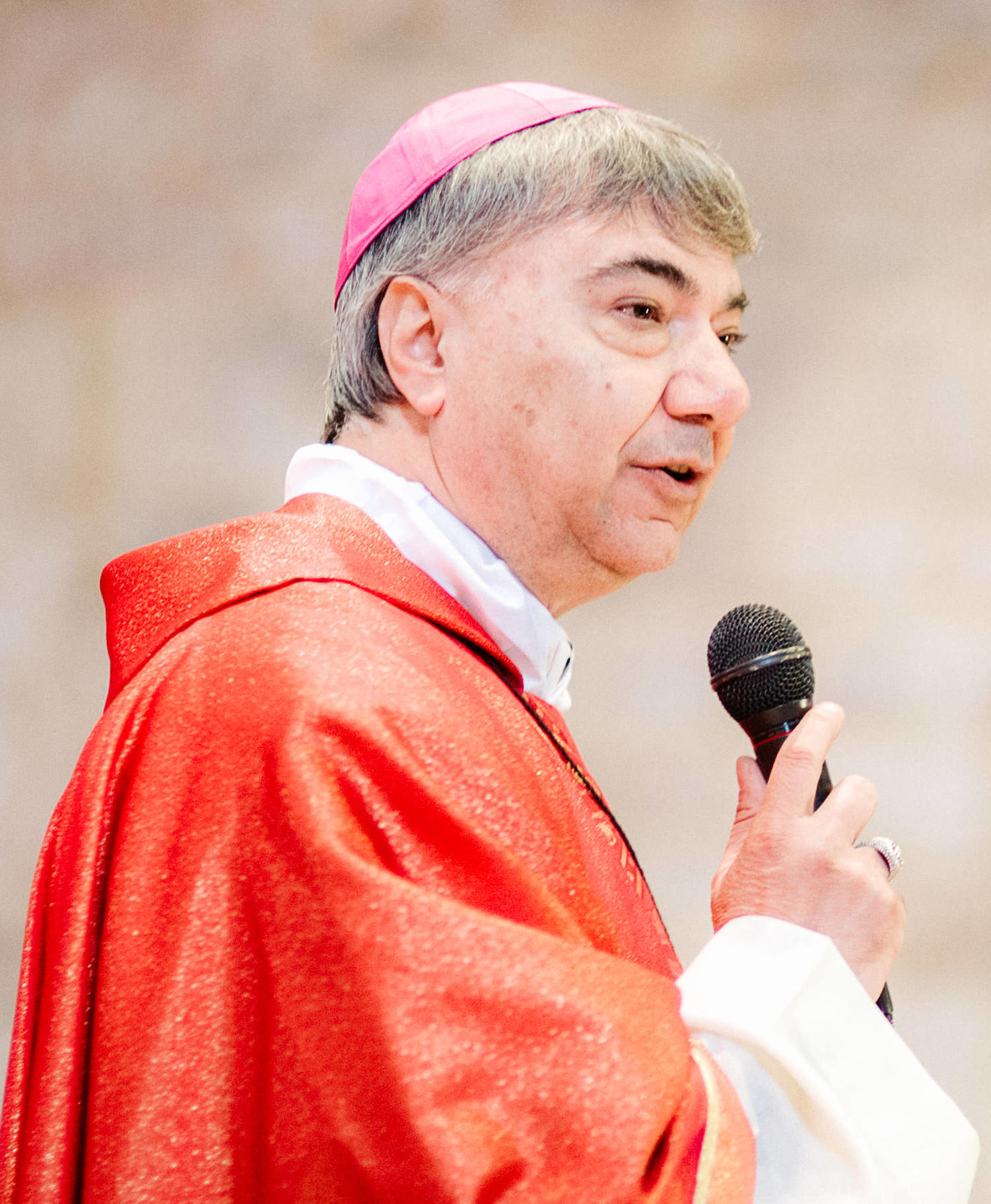
- Battaglia in 2018
- Church: Roman Catholic Church
- Archdiocese: Naples
- See: Naples
- Appointed: 12 December 2020
- Installed: 2 February 2021
- Predecessor: Crescenzio Sepe
- Other post: Cardinal-Priest of San Marco in Agro Laurentino (2024–)
- Previous post: Bishop of Cerreto Sannita-Telese-Sant'Agata de'Goti (2016–2020)

Orders
- Ordination: 6 February 1988
- Consecration: 3 September 2016 by Vincenzo Bertolone S.d.P.
- Created cardinal: 7 December 2024 by Pope Francis
- Rank: Cardinal-Priest

Personal details
- Born: Domenico Battaglia; 20 January 1963 (age 63) Satriano, Italy
- Denomination: Catholic (Latin Rite)
- Motto: Confide surge vocat Te
- Coat of arms

Styles of Domenico Battaglia
- Reference style: His Eminence
- Spoken style: Your Eminence
- Informal style: Cardinal
- See: Naples

Domenico "Mimmo" Battaglia (Note: Battaglia has used the name Mimmo Battaglia when signing his first letter to the Catholics of Naples and on his published works; newspapers use the name Mimmo occasionally, as Avvenire did in the caption of a photo accompanying its coverage of his appointment in Naples. Il Fatto Quotidiano uses the phrase "Don Mimmo, as he likes to be called".) (born 20 January 1963) is an Italian Catholic prelate who has been Archbishop of Naples since 2020. He was previously Bishop of Cerreto Sannita-Telese-Sant'Agata de' Goti from 2016 to 2020. He was made a cardinal on 7 December 2024 by Pope Francis, the last nominated before Pope Francis's death.

== Biography ==
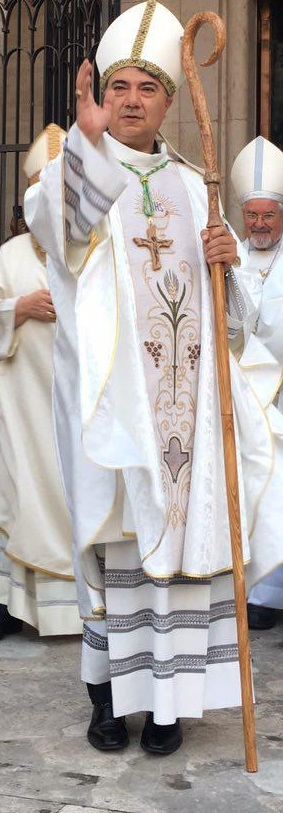
Battaglia on the day he was consecrated a bishop

Domenico Battaglia was born on 20 January 1963 in Satriano in the province of Catanzaro. He studied philosophy and theology at the Pontifical Regional Seminary San Pio X in Catanzaro. After being ordained a priest on 6 February 1988, he was Rector of the Archiepiscopal Preparatory Seminary of Catanzaro and a member of the Diocesan Commission for Justice and Peace from 1989 to 1992, parish administrator in Sant'Elia, parish priest of Madonna del Carmine in Catanzaro, Director of the Diocesan Office for Missionary Cooperation between Churches, and parish priest in Satriano from 1992 to 1999. He was collaborator of the Shrine of Santa Maria delle Grazie in Torre di Ruggiero, parish collaborator in Montepaone Lido and administrator of the parish of Santa Maria di Altavilla in Satriano.

In 1992, he became President of the Calabrese Solidarity Center, which supports efforts to recover from drug addiction and is associated with the Italian Federation of Therapeutic Communities (Italian: Federazione italiana delle comunità terapeutiche or FICT). From 2000 to 2006, he was Vice President of the Bethany Foundation (Italian: Fondazione Betania) a non-profit organization that operates rehabilitation centers and residential healthcare facilities in the provinces of Catanzaro and Vibo Valentia. From 2006 to 2015 he was National President of FICT.

Pope Francis named him Bishop of Cerreto Sannita-Telese-Sant’Agata de 'Goti on 24 June 2016. He was the first priest of the diocese to become a bishop since 1960. He received his episcopal consecration on 3 September from Archbishop Vincenzo Bertolone and was installed on 2 October. He chose as his episcopal motto "Confide Surge Vocat Te" (Take heart, Stand Up, He is Calling) from Mark 10:49. While a bishop, he continued his work as a "street priest", which earned him the sobriquet "Bergoglio of the South". In a pastoral letter in April 2020, he said that the COVID-19 pandemic had "exposed the fragility of this world of ours ... the weakness of that economy which, both locally and globally, was considered the single goal, and was seen and applauded as the only route, without any restraints, to human happiness on earth".

Pope Francis appointed Battaglia as Archbishop of Naples on 12 December 2020. His installation was on 2 February 2021.

On 4 November 2024, Francis announced he plans to make Battaglia a cardinal on 7 December. On 7 December 2024, Pope Francis made him a cardinal, assigning him as a member of the order of cardinal priests the title of San Marco Evangelista in Agro Laurentino.

He participated as a cardinal elector in the 2025 papal conclave that elected Pope Leo XIV.

== See also ==
- Cardinals created by Pope Francis
