= San Marco Evangelista in Agro Laurentino =

San Marco in Agro Laurentino
- Church of Saint Mark the Evangelist in the Field of Laurels (in English); S. Marci in Agro Laurentino (in Latin)
- Click on the map for a fullscreen view
- 41°49′15″N 12°29′02″E
- Location: Piazza Giuliani e Dalmati 20, Rome
- Country: Italy
- Denomination: Roman Catholic
- Tradition: Roman Rite
- Website: sanmarcoevangelista.wixsite.com

History
- Status: Titular church National church
- Dedication: Mark the Evangelist
- Consecrated: 1972

Architecture
- Architectural type: Church
- Groundbreaking: 1970
- Completed: 1972

Administration
- District: Lazio
- Province: Rome

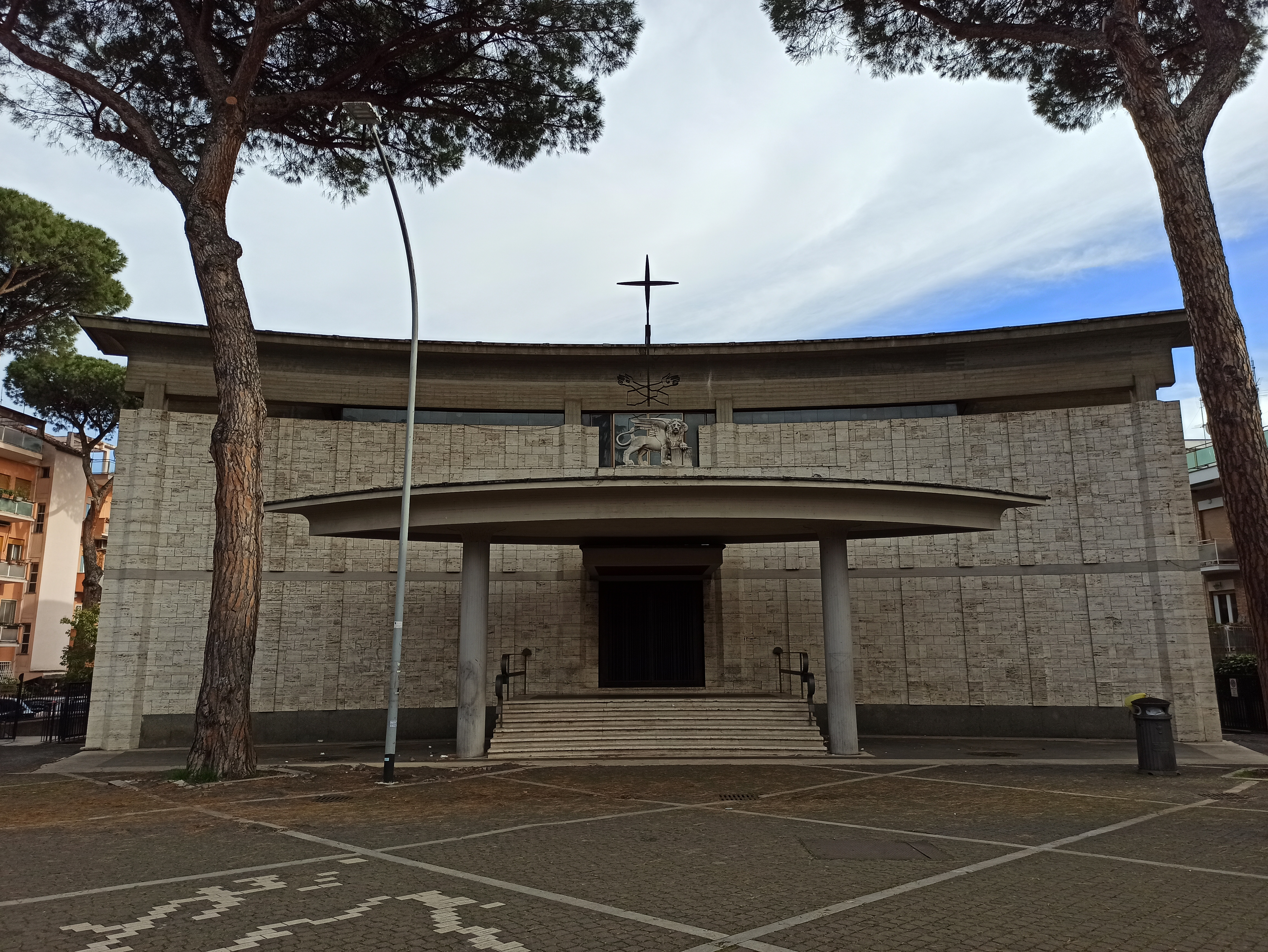
Church of San Marco Evangelista in Agro Laurentino, Rome

San Marco Evangelista in Agro Laurentino is a Catholic church in Rome, Italy on the Piazza Giuliani e Dalmati in the Giuliano-Dalmata quarter. The dedication to Saint Mark alludes to the presence in the area of Istrian and Dalmatian refugees (who fled the Julian March after the Second World War), as does the Lion of St. Mark above the portico.

It was erected between 1970 and 1972 to plans of Ennio Canino and Cardinal Vicar Angelo Dell'Acqua consecrated it on 29 May 1972. Two popes have visited it: Pope Paul VI in April 1973 and Pope John Paul II in January 1984.

Inside the church is a bronze Madonna by Perrotta and a bronze crucifix by U. Montalbano. In the crypt is a series of mosaics depicting the patron saints of the native nations of the Giuliano-Dalmati, i. e., northeastern Adriatic, refugees.

The decree of Cardinal Vicar Francesco Marchetti Selvaggiani, Pastoris vigilantis established the church as a parish church on 9 March 1950. Since 1973 it has been the seat of the titulus of "San Marco in Agro Laurentino". The Conventual Friars Minor are its custodians.

== List of Titular Cardinals ==
- Emile Biayenda, 5 March 1973 – 23 March 1977
- Alexandre do Nascimento, 2 February 1983 – 28 September 2024
- Domenico Battaglia, 7 December 2024 - present

== Bibliography ==
- C. Rendina, Le Chiese di Roma, Newton & Compton Editori, Milano 2000, 199
