= Dicastery for Promoting Integral Human Development =

Dicastery of the Roman Curia

- Established: 1 January 2017
- Founder: Pope Francis
- Merger of: Pontifical Council for Justice and Peace, Pontifical Council Cor Unum, Pontifical Council for the Pastoral Care of Migrants and Itinerant People, Pontifical Council for Health Pastoral Care
- Type: Dicastery
- Location: Palazzo San Calisto 00120 Vatican City
- Prefect: Alessandra Smerilli
- Pro-Prefect: Fabio Baggio
- Parent organization: Roman Curia
- Website: www.humandevelopment.va/en.html

The Dicastery for Promoting Integral Human Development (Latin: Dicasterium ad integram humanam progressionem fovendam) is a dicastery of the Roman curia.

The Vatican announced the creation of the dicastery on 31 August 2016 and it became effective 1 January 2017. Cardinal Peter Turkson was named its first prefect. The prefect is to be assisted by a secretary and at least one undersecretary.

On 21 December 2021, members of the dicastery's leadership submitted their resignations in anticipation of the end of their five-year mandate in January. Pope Francis accepted them. On 23 December 2021, Pope Francis named Cardinal Michael Czerny and Sister Alessandra Smerilli Interim Prefect and Secretary, respectively, of the dicastery, beginning 1 January 2022. On 23 April 2022, Francis named the two as the official Prefect and Secretary, giving them a five-year mandate. In 2026, Cardinal Fabio Baggio became Pro-Prefect of the dicastery while Smerilli became Prefect, replacing Czerny.

== Description ==
This dicastery of the Roman Curia combined the work of four Pontifical Councils established following the Second Vatican Council: Justice and Peace, Pastoral Care of Migrants and Itinerant People, Pastoral Assistance to Health Care Workers, and Cor Unum. Pope Francis gave it responsibility for "issues regarding migrants, those in need, the sick, the excluded and marginalized, the imprisoned and the unemployed, as well as victims of armed conflict, natural disasters, and all forms of slavery and torture".

On 16 June 2017 the pope named Bruno Marie Duffé, a French professor with long experience in human rights and relief work, the dicastery's secretary. Fr. Nicola Riccardi and Msgr. Segundo Tejado Muñoz were named undersecretaries, on 8 July 2017.

== Migrants and Refugees Section ==
In 2016, Pope Francis announced that "temporarily" he would personally direct the special Migrants and Refugees Section which is part of the Dicastery. He named the Canadian Jesuit Michael Czerny (later cardinal) and the Italian Scalabrinian Fabio Baggio to serve as undersecretaries for issues related to refugees and migrants.

== Vatican COVID-19 Commission ==
On 20 March 2020, Pope Francis asked the Dicastery for Promoting Integral Human Development (DPIHD) to create a Vatican COVID-19 Commission to express the Church's solicitude facing the COVID-19 pandemic, and propose responses to the potential socio-economic challenges deriving from it.

== Mission and activities ==
From the Statutes of the Dicastery for Promoting Integral Human Development:

The Dicastery promotes integral human development in the light of the Gospel and in the tradition of the Church's social teachings. To this end, it maintains relations with the Conferences of Bishops, offering them its cooperation so that values related to justice and peace as well as the care of creation may be promoted.

[...]

In fulfilling its mission, it may establish relationships with associations, institutes and non-governmental organizations, including those outside the Catholic Church, who are committed to promoting justice and peace. It may also enter into discussion with representatives of civil governments and other international public institutions, in order to promote study, deepen knowledge, and public awareness regarding matters within its competence, while respecting the competencies of other offices of the Roman Curia.

The Dicastery for Promoting Integral Human Development is committed to fostering among peoples: sensitivity for peace, commitment to justice and solidarity with those who are most vulnerable such as migrants and refugees, particularly through the celebrations of the World Day of Peace, the World Day of Migrants, the World Day of the Sick. Its activities include also the presentation of the annual Lenten Message of the Pope.

== Apostleship of the Sea ==
The Dicastery also has the responsibility to handle the Apostleship of the Sea created in 2025 (not to be confused with the Stella Maris).
