= Scalabrinians =

Catholic religious institute

Congregation of the Missionaries of Saint Charles Borromeo
- Abbreviation: Post-nominal letters: (C.S.)
- Nickname: Scalabrinians
- Formation: 1887; 139 years ago
- Founder: St. Giovanni Battista Scalabrini
- Founded at: Piacenza, Italy
- Type: Clerical religious congregation of pontifical right (for men)
- Headquarters: General Mother Huse; Via Calandrelli 42, 00153 Rome, Italy
- Coordinates: 41°54′4.9″N 12°27′38.2″E
- Region served: Worldwide
- Members: 706 members (560 priests) as of 2018
- Superior General: Leonir Mario Chiarello
- Ministry: Parochial work
- Main organ: Scalabriniani Magazine
- Affiliations: Catholic Church
- Website: scalabriniani.org

The Congregation of the Missionaries of Saint Charles Borromeo (Latin: Congregatio Missionariorum a S. Carolo), commonly called the Scalabrinian Missionaries, is a Catholic religious institute of brothers and priests founded by Giovanni Battista Scalabrini, Bishop of Piacenza in Italy, in 1887. The members of the congregation add the nominal letters CS after their names to indicate their membership in the Congregation. Its mission is to "maintain Catholic faith and practice among Italian emigrants in the New World." Today, they and their sister organizations, the Missionary Sisters of St. Charles Borromeo (founded by Scalabrini on 25 October 1895) and the Secular Institute of the Scalabrinian Missionary Women (founded 25 July 1961) minister to migrants, refugees and displaced persons.

== History ==
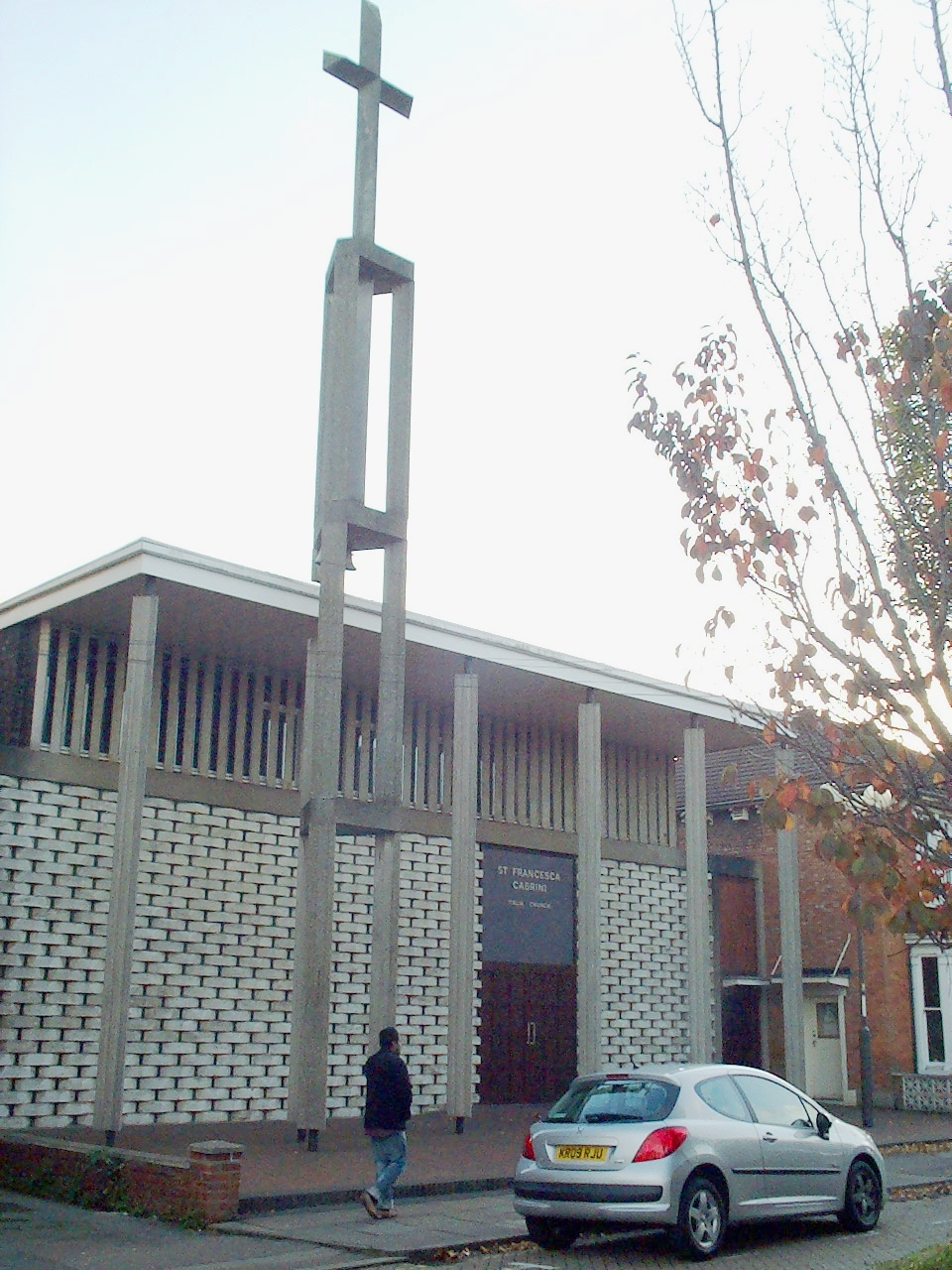
Church of St. Francesca Cabrini founded by the Missionaries of St. Charles Borromeo in 1965 in Bedford, England

The founding of the institute was approved by Pope Leo XIII in a papal brief dated 25 November 1887 and the approval of its Constitution by a decree of the Sacred Congregation of Propaganda followed on 3 October 1908.

The expediency of providing for the spiritual and also, to some degree, for the temporal needs of Italian emigrants to the Americas was brought to the attention of Bishop Scalabrini by the pathetic sight of a number of such emigrants waiting in the great railway station of Milan. Acting upon this inspiration, and encouraged by Cardinal Giovanni Simeoni, then prefect of the Congregation for the Propagation of the Faith, Scalabrini acquired a residence in Piacenza where he established the "Christopher Columbus Apostolic Institution", forming there a community of priests which became the nucleus of a new congregation.

This congregation, which was henceforth to be known as the Missionaries of St. Charles Borromeo, was to be governed by a superior general, dependent upon the Congregation for the Propagation of the Faith. Its primary aim was to maintain the practice of the Catholic faith among Italian emigrants in the New World, and "to ensure as far as possible their moral, civil, and economic welfare." It was to provide priests for the emigrants, as well as committees of persons who would give good advice and practical direction needed by poor Italians who were new arrivals in foreign ports; to establish churches, schools, and missionary homes in the various Italian colonies in North and South America; and to train youths for the priesthood. The members of the congregation promise obedience to their superiors in the congregation and the ecclesiastical hierarchy.

Seven priests and three lay brothers of Scalabrini's institute left Italy on 12 July 1888, of whom two priests and one lay brother were bound for New York City, five priests and two lay brothers for various parts of Brazil. On this occasion, Cesare Cantú, the famous Italian historian, addressed to the Bishop of Piacenza some memorable words of congratulation, asking leave to add to the bishop's blessing on the departing missionaries, "the prayers of an old man who admires a courage and an abnegation so full of humility." A welcome had already been assured these first missionaries of the congregation by a commendatory letter (1 June 1888) of Leo XIII addressed to the American bishops.

Immediately after their arrival in New York City, the missionaries secured a favourable site in Centre Street, where there was a colony of Italians, and in a short time a chapel was opened; soon after this, the Church of the Resurrection was opened on Mulberry Street; lastly, a building on Roosevelt Street, which had been a Protestant place of worship, became the property of the Scalabrini Fathers, who transformed it into the Church of St. Joachim, the first national parish for Italian immigrants in the Archdiocese of New York. The Society of St. Raphael, an emigrant aid society, was organized at Ellis Island. The Scalabrini's work thereafter spread rapidly through the continent.

== Formation in the Philippines ==
The Scalabrini Formation Center. The formation of the first Scalabrinian seminarians was set with the challenging reality that a house must be built for such a purpose. In 1984, seminarians were living in the Mission House where the first three missionary Fathers lived. With this setting, there had been found a problem in terms of space since the community had flourished in number. By the fact that the community started to grow, the shout for a new building was eminently sounded. Anthony Paganoni, being the local superior took the challenge. As was the case, and with the Father General's knowledge about the matter, the visit of the provincial treasurer in July 1984 had posed the hope that a new building be opened where seminarians would formally concentrate on the priestly formation after the image of Christ, the High Priest.

"As grace from God overflows all the more", the construction of the formation center followed as early as the shout was heard. Hence, Scalabrini Formation Center (SFC) was blessed on November 28, 1985, by Cardinal Ricardo Vidal, the archbishop himself.

"In designing a priestly formation program, the fathers, led by the Director of Formation, Fr. Sabbadin, drew on Scalabrinian Models from other countries but they were very conscious they have been conceived in Western context. They also drew on the experience of other orders already working in the Philippines but over the next almost twenty years there would be experimentation. Formation was perceived as a journey in faith by the student to experience God and His Providence in the world, especially in the world of migration" (Desmond Cahill, pg. 369). "In 1986, the first group of Filipinos was sent to Italy for the novitiate. This practice went on until 1993. In 1989, Fr. Nazareno became the second rector until 1995 when he went back to Italy. The Eternal Father called him five months later. During his term, in 1992, the first four Filipino Priests were ordained: on June 1, Florentino Galdo, Mario Lorenzana, Fidel Magno, and on August 2, Romeo Velos"
