= Ángel Fernández Artime =

Roman Catholic Salesian priest

His Eminence Ángel Fernández Artime S.D.B.
- Cardinal; Pro-Prefect of the Dicastery for Institutes of Consecrated Life and Societies of Apostolic Life
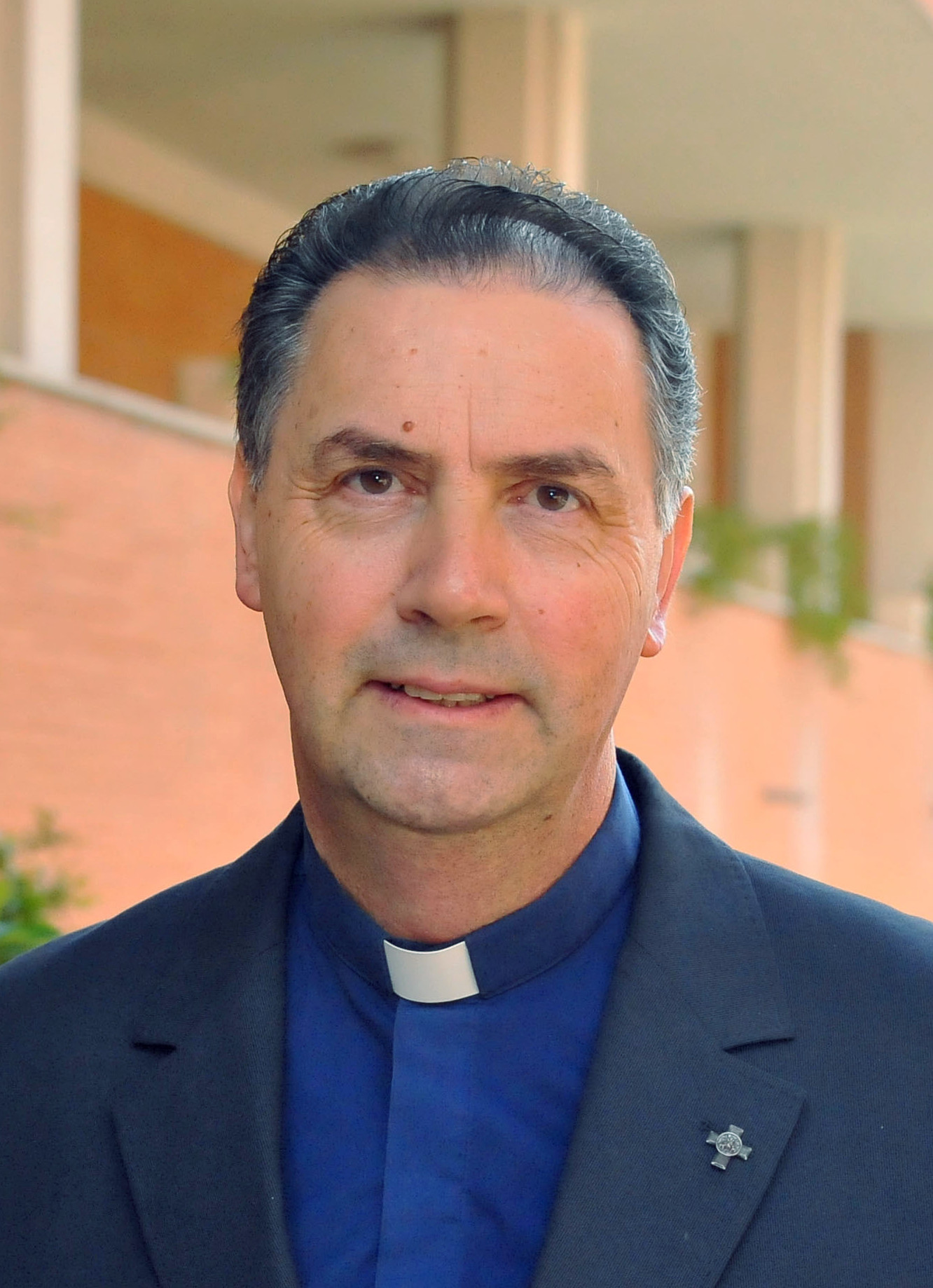
- Fernández in 2014
- Appointed: 6 January 2025
- Other posts: Cardinal-Deacon of Santa Maria Ausiliatrice in Via Tuscolana (2023-); Pontifical Legate for the Basilicas of Saint Francis and Saint Mary of the Angels in Assisi (2025–)
- Previous posts: Provincial for León (2000–06); Provincial for Southern Argentina (2009–14); Titular Archbishop of Ursona (2024); Rector Major of the Salesians (2014–24)

Orders
- Ordination: 4 July 1987
- Consecration: 20 April 2024 by Emil Paul Tscherrig
- Created cardinal: 30 September 2023 by Pope Francis
- Rank: Cardinal-Deacon

Personal details
- Born: 21 August 1960 (age 66) Luanco, Gozón, Asturias, Spain
- Education: University of Valladolid
- Motto: Sufficit tibi gratia mea ("My grace is sufficient for You")
- Coat of arms

Ángel Fernández Artime, S.D.B. (born 21 August 1960) is a Spanish Catholic prelate who has served as Pro-Prefect of the Dicastery for Institutes of Consecrated Life and Societies of Apostolic Life since 2025. He was Rector Major of the Salesians from 2014 to 2024, the first Spaniard to hold that office. He was previously provincial superior of the Salesian Province of Leon from 2000 to 2006 and of the Southern Argentina Province from 2009 to 2014.

Pope Francis made Fernández a cardinal in 2023 and allowed him to continue as rector until 16 August 2024. He was the first cleric made a cardinal while heading a religious order and the first cardinal elector not already a bishop since Roberto Tucci in 2001. (Note: Tucci was never consecrated a bishop, but turned 80 and lost his status as an elector two months after becoming a cardinal.) Fernández's episcopal consecration was celebrated on 20 April 2024.

== Early life ==
Ángel Fernández Artime was born in Gozón-Luanco, Asturias, on 21 August 1960. His father was a fisherman and his mother sold his catch. In 1970 his family moved to Astudillo, Palencia, where he enrolled in boarding school. He then studied for three years in Cambados (Pontevedra) and then entered the Salesian school in León. He professed his first vows on 3 September 1978 and his final vows on 17 June 1984 in Santiago de Campostela. He was ordained a priest on 4 July 1987 in León.

Fernández holds a bachelor's degree in pastoral theology, philosophy and pedagogy from the University of Valladolid. Following his ordination, he began his ministry teaching religion at the Santo Angel Salesian College of Avilés (Asturias) and was then director of the Salesian College of Ourense.

== Career ==
As a member of the Salesian Province of León, Fernandez was a member of the Provincial Council and vice provincial. From 2000 to 2006 he was superior of that Province. He was selected to team with the organizers of the 26th General Chapter in Rome in 2008. In 2009 he was elected provincial for the Southern Argentina Province, headquartered in Buenos Aires. There Fernandez worked with Cardinal Jorge Mario Bergoglio, who later became Pope Francis.

The General Council of the Salesians elected him to a six-year term as rector major of the order in March 2014. (Note: He had been designated to become provincial of the new Province of Mediterranean Spain headquartered in Sevilla, but never took up that position because of his election as rector.) He is the first Spaniard and third non-Italian to become rector of the Salesians. As rector major, he presided at the opening of the celebrations of the 200th birthday of Saint John Bosco on 24 January 2015 in Turin. He was elected to a second six-year term as rector on 11 March 2020.

On 9 July 2023, Pope Francis announced he planned to make him a cardinal at a consistory scheduled for 30 September. He was the first superior of a religious congregation to be made a cardinal. At that consistory he was assigned to the order of cardinal deacons with the title of Santa Maria Ausiliatrice in via Tuscolana. Pope Francis initially told Fernández he could continue to serve as rector until 31 July 2024, when he would be given a new assignment. He later modified that date to 16 August. Fernández was made a member of the Dicastery for Institutes of Consecrated Life and Societies of Apostolic Life on 4 October 2023. The Salesian Congregation elected Maltese priest Father Fabio Attard, SDB, to succeed Fernandez as rector major on 25 March 2025.

His episcopal consecration was celebrated on 20 April 2024. Pope Francis assigned him the titular see of Ursona with the title of archbishop. He received his episcopal consecration from Cardinal Emil Paul Tscherrig, with co-consecrators Cardinal Cristóbal López Romero and Bishop Lucas Van Looy, both Salesians. He announced the end of his service as rector of the Salesians on 16 August. On 6 January 2025, Pope Francis named him Pro-Prefect of the Dicastery for Institutes of Consecrated Life and Societies of Apostolic Life.

He participated as a cardinal elector in the 2025 papal conclave that elected Pope Leo XIV.

On 16 July 2025, Pope Leo named him Pontifical Legate for the Basilicas of Saint Francis and Saint Mary of the Angels in Assisi.

== See also ==
- Cardinals created by Francis

== Notes ==
Catholic Church titles
Preceded by Pascual Chávez Villanueva	Rector Major of the Salesians; 2014–2024	Succeeded by Fabio Attard
Preceded by Paolo Sardi	Cardinal-Deacon of Santa Maria Ausiliatrice in Via Tusculana; 30 September 2023–present	Incumbent
Preceded by João Braz de Aviz as Prefect	Pro-Prefect of the Dicastery for Institutes of Consecrated Life and Societies of Apostolic Life; 6 January 2025 – present	Incumbent
Preceded by Agostino Vallini	Pontifical Legate for the Basilicas of Saint Francis and Saint Mary of the Angels in Assisi; 16 July 2025-present	Incumbent
