= Tarcisio Bertone =

Italian prelate and Vatican diplomat (born 1934)

His Eminence Tarcisio Bertone SDB
- Cardinal Secretary of State Emeritus
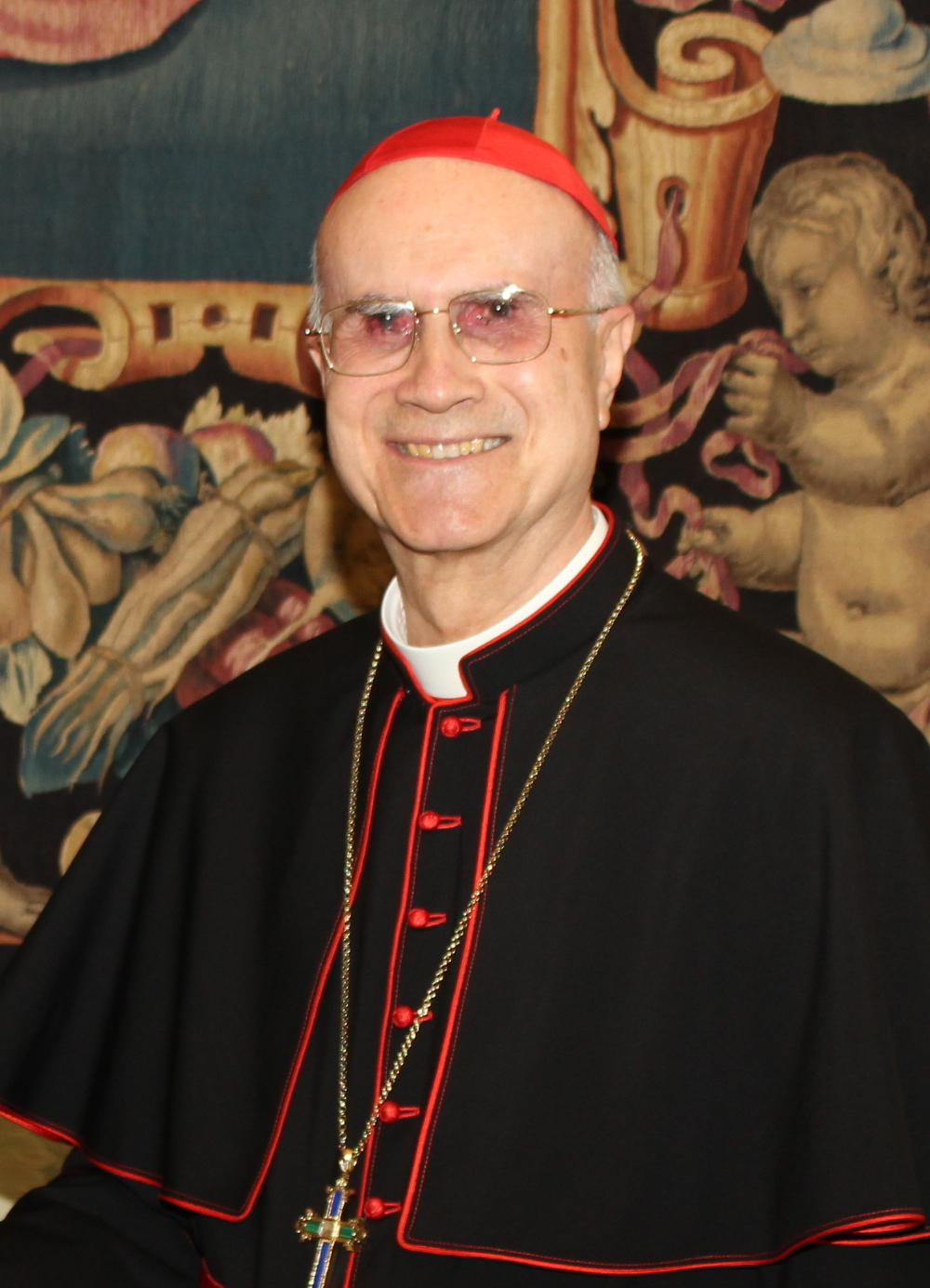
- Appointed: 15 September 2006
- Term ended: 15 October 2013
- Predecessor: Angelo Sodano
- Successor: Pietro Parolin
- Other post: Cardinal-Bishop of Frascati (2008–present)
- Previous posts: Archbishop of Vercelli (1991–1995); Secretary of the Congregation for the Doctrine of the Faith (1995–2002); Archbishop of Genoa (2002–2006); Cardinal-Priest of S. Maria Auxiliatrice in via Tuscolana (2003–2008); Cardinal Secretary of State (2006–2013); Camerlengo of the Holy Roman Church (2007–2014)

Orders
- Ordination: 1 July 1960 by Albino Mensa
- Consecration: 1 August 1991 by Albino Mensa
- Created cardinal: 21 October 2003 by John Paul II
- Rank: Cardinal-Bishop

Personal details
- Born: Tarcisio Pietro Evasio Bertone; 2 December 1934 (age 91) Romano Canavese, Kingdom of Italy
- Education: Salesian Pontifical University (JCD)
- Motto: Fidem custodire, concordiam servare (Protect faith, preserve unity)
- Signature: Tarcisio Bertone's signature

- Coat of arms: Tarcisio Bertone's coat of arms

Styles of Tarcisio Bertone
- Reference style: His Eminence
- Spoken style: Your Eminence
- Religious style: Monsignor
- Informal style: Cardinal
- See: Frascati (Suburbicarian)

Ordination history of Tarcisio Bertone
History
Priestly ordination
- Ordained by: Albino Mensa (Vercelli)
- Date: 1 July 1960
Episcopal consecration
- Consecrated by: Albino Mensa (Vercelli emer.)
- Date: 1 August 1991
Cardinalate
- Elevated by: Pope John Paul II
- Date: 21 October 2003
Episcopal succession
Bishops consecrated by Tarcisio Bertone as principal consecrator
- Mauro Piacenza: 15 November 2003
- Luigi Palletti: 16 January 2005
- Raffaele Farina SDB: 16 December 2006
- Gianfranco Girotti OFM Conv: 16 December 2006
- Antoni Stankiewicz: 16 December 2006
- Carlo Chenis SDB: 10 February 2007
- Leo Boccardi: 18 March 2007
- Vincenzo Bertolone SdP: 3 May 2007
- Michele Di Ruberto: 30 June 2007
- Gaetano Galbusera Fumagalli SDB: 26 August 2007
- Vito Rallo: 28 October 2007
- Gianni Ambrosio: 16 February 2008
- Luciano Suriani: 26 April 2008
- Léon Kalenga Badikebele: 1 May 2008
- Frans Daneels OPraem: 1 May 2008
- Juan Ignacio Arrieta Ochoa de Chinchetru: 1 May 2008
- Miguel Maury Buendía: 12 June 2008
- Paolo De Nicolò: 12 June 2008
- Bernardito Auza: 3 July 2008
- Piergiuseppe Vacchelli: 3 July 2008
- Luis Ladaria Ferrer SJ: 26 July 2008
- Ambrogio Spreafico: 26 July 2008
- Martin Krebs: 16 November 2008
- Luigi Bianco: 25 April 2009
- Jan Pawłowski: 30 April 2009
- Joseph Spiteri: 24 May 2009
- Mario Toso SDB: 12 December 2009
- Jean Laffitte: 12 December 2009
- Giovanni D'Ercole FDP: 12 December 2009
- Petar Rajič: 23 January 2010
- Piero Pioppo: 18 March 2010
- Novatus Rugambwa: 18 March 2010
- Eugene Nugent: 18 March 2010
- Valentino Di Cerbo: 1 May 2010
- Joseph William Tobin CSsR: 9 October 2010
- Giorgio Lingua: 9 October 2010
- Ignacio Carrasco de Paula: 9 October 2010
- Enrico dal Covolo SDB: 9 October 2010
- Mauro Maria Morfino SDB: 3 April 2011
- Jan Vokál: 7 May 2011
- Giuseppe Sciacca: 8 October 2011
- Barthélemy Adoukonou: 8 October 2011
- Francesco Cavina: 22 January 2012
- Julio Murat: 3 March 2012
- Luciano Russo: 14 April 2012
- Edoardo Aldo Cerrato, C.O.: 8 September 2012
- Guido Pozzo: 18 November 2012
- Ettore Balestrero: 27 April 2013
- Michael Wallace Banach: 27 April 2013
- Brian Udaigwe: 27 April 2013

Tarcisio Pietro Evasio Bertone SDB (born 2 December 1934) is an Italian prelate of the Catholic Church and a Vatican diplomat. A cardinal since 2003, he served as Archbishop of Vercelli from 1991 to 1995, Secretary of the Congregation for the Doctrine of the Faith from 1995 to 2002, Archbishop of Genoa from 2002 to 2006, and as Cardinal Secretary of State from 2006 to 2013. On 10 May 2008, he was named Cardinal-Bishop of Frascati.

Bertone served as Camerlengo from 2007 to 2014. In the period between Pope Benedict XVI's resignation on 28 February 2013 and the election of Pope Francis on 13 March 2013, he served temporarily as the administrator of the Holy See and acting head of state of the Vatican City State. He was considered a contender to succeed Benedict XVI.

Besides his native Italian, Bertone speaks fluent French, Spanish, German and Portuguese. He has some knowledge of English, although he is not fluent, and he can read Polish, Latin, Greek and Hebrew.

== Early life ==
Bertone was born in Romano Canavese, Piedmont, the fifth of eight children. Bertone has stated that his mother was a determined anti-fascist militant of the Italian People's Party, and later a Christian Democrat.

Bertone professed his vows as a member of the Salesians on 3 December 1950 and was ordained a priest by Archbishop Albino Mensa on 1 July 1960. He holds a doctorate in canon law. His dissertation was entitled The Governance of the Church in the Thought of Pope Benedict XIV (1740–1758). He served as Professor of Special Moral Theology at the Pontifical Salesian University from 1967 until his appointment as Professor of Canon Law in 1976, a post he held until 1991. Bertone was a visiting professor of Public Ecclesiastical Law at the Institute Utriusque Iuris of the Pontifical Lateran University in 1978. He was commissioned by Pope John Paul II to assist Emmanuel Milingo, Archbishop Emeritus of Lusaka, Zambia, in returning to the Catholic Church in 2001. Milingo had left the church to marry Maria Sung of Sun Myung Moon's Unification Church.

== Archbishop and Cardinal ==
On 4 July 1991, Bertone was appointed Archbishop of Vercelli by Pope John Paul II. He was consecrated bishop one month later by Mensa, who had also ordained him priest. He held this post until his resignation in 1995 upon being named Secretary of the Congregation for the Doctrine of the Faith under Cardinal Joseph Ratzinger, who later became Pope Benedict XVI. Appointed Archbishop of Genoa on 10 December 2002 and installed on 2 February 2003, Bertone was elevated to the College of Cardinals in the consistory of 21 October 2003, as Cardinal-Priest of Santa Maria Ausiliatrice in Via Tuscolana.

He later specialized in the relationship between social morality, faith and politics. He also assisted with the revision of the 1983 Code of Canon Law and undertook pastoral work in parishes. In the Jubilee Year 2000, Bertone was entrusted by John Paul II with the publication of the third secret of Fatima.

Bertone was one of the cardinal electors who participated in the 2005 papal conclave that elected Pope Benedict XVI. He also participated as a cardinal elector in the 2013 papal conclave that elected Pope Francis.

== Cardinal Secretary of State ==
Coat of arms of camerlengo Bertone

On 22 June 2006, Benedict XVI appointed Bertone to replace Angelo Sodano as the Cardinal Secretary of State. He assumed the office on 15 September. On 26 June 2006 Bertone was appointed Knight Grand Cross of the Order of Merit of the Italian Republic.

Complaints about Bertone's performance as secretary of state began early in his tenure. He had no prior experience in the Vatican's diplomatic corps.

Two weeks before entering office, asked about reforms of the Roman Curia, Bertone remarked, "After almost two decades, an evaluation of how the dicasteries are organised is more than comprehensible, in order to reflect on how to make the existing structures more efficient for the mission of the Church and eventually to consider whether all of them should be maintained".

On 4 April 2007, Benedict XVI appointed Bertone as Camerlengo of the Holy Roman Church. The duties of the camerlengo are largely confined to administration during the vacancy of the Holy See. On 10 May 2008, he was promoted to the rank of Cardinal-Bishop of Frascati.

When Pope Benedict XVI resigned on 28 February 2013, Bertone, as camerlengo, was the acting sovereign for Vatican City State and administrator for the Holy See until the election of a new pope.

On 13 February 2013, at the last public Mass of Pope Benedict XVI before his resignation took effect on 28 February, Bertone praised Pope Benedict, "We would not be honest, Your Holiness, if we said that this evening there is not a hint of sadness in our hearts. In recent years, your teaching has been a window open onto the Church and the world, which let in the rays of truth and love of God, to enlighten and warm our journey, even and especially at times when clouds gathered in the sky". Bertone continued: "All of us have realized that it is precisely the deep love that Your Holiness has for God and the Church that prompted you to make this act, revealing that purity of mind, that strong and demanding faith, that strength of humility and meekness, along with great courage, that have marked every step of your life and your ministry".

Bertone was the second most senior cardinal-elector in order of precedence among the cardinal-electors who participated in the 2013 conclave that elected Pope Francis, after the presiding cardinal Giovanni Battista Re. Bertone himself was seen as a contender to succeed to the papacy, although his chances as a papabile were thought diminished by the perception that he was a "potential scandal in the making". At Pope Francis' inauguration, Bertone was one of the six cardinals who made the public act of obedience on behalf of the College of Cardinals. (Note: The other five cardinals were Giovanni Battista Re, Joachim Meisner, Jozef Tomko, Renato Raffaele Martino and Francesco Marchisano. Bertone and Re (the presiding cardinal at the conclave) represented the cardinal-bishops; Meisner and Tomko represented the cardinal priests; and Martino and Marchisano represented the cardinal-deacons.)

Bertone was a member of the Congregation for the Doctrine of the Faith, Congregation for the Clergy, the Congregation for Divine Worship and the Discipline of the Sacraments, the Congregation for the Oriental Churches, the Congregation for Bishops and the Congregation for the Evangelization of Peoples until his 80th birthday on 2 December 2014.

== Controversies ==
=== The Da Vinci Code ===
On 15 March 2005, Bertone was in the news for "breaking the Church's silence" and criticizing Dan Brown's 2003 novel The Da Vinci Code, saying the book was "shameful and full of unfounded lies", and that believers should boycott the book. Both Bertone and official Vatican spokespeople insisted that Bertone was not speaking as an official representative of the Catholic Church, but it was also noted that Bertone's high placement within the church hierarchy and the fact that he was often named as a potential candidate for the papacy gave his words considerable weight, such that his comments were often reported by various media as an official statement from the Vatican. In 2006, the NBC news program Dateline described his statement as "a high-ranking Vatican cardinal called for a boycott of the film."

=== Church and sports ===
Bertone suggested in December 2006 that the Holy See "could, in future, field a team that plays at the top level, with Roma, Internazionale, Genoa and Sampdoria." He continued: "If we just take the Brazilian students from our Pontifical universities we could have a magnificent squad". Hours later he said "I've got much more to do than cultivating a football squad for the Vatican" and explained that his earlier remark was not intended to be taken seriously.

=== Defense of Pius XII ===
On 5 June 2007, at a conference announcing the release of a new biography of Pope Pius XII, Bertone defended Pius against claims of indifference toward the Jews during the Holocaust. Bertone condemned this accusation as a "black legend" and "an attack on good sense and on rationality", which has "become so firmly established that even to scratch it is an arduous task". Although he admitted that Pius XII had been "cautious" in condemning Nazi Germany, Bertone stated that Nazi forces would have intensified its program of genocide had the Pope been more outspoken.

=== Pope Benedict XVI Islam controversy ===
On 16 September 2006, Bertone, after one day as Cardinal Secretary of State, released a declaration explaining that the "position of the Pope concerning Islam is unequivocally that expressed by the conciliar document Nostra aetate" and that "the Pope's option in favour of inter-religious and inter-cultural dialogue is equally unequivocal." He said:

As for the opinion of the Byzantine emperor Manuel II Paleologus which he quoted during his Regensburg talk, the Holy Father did not mean, nor does he mean, to make that opinion his own in any way. He simply used it as a means to undertake—in an academic context, and as is evident from a complete and attentive reading of the text—certain reflections on the theme of the relationship between religion and violence in general, and to conclude with a clear and radical rejection of the religious motivation for violence, from whatever side it may come. [The Pope] sincerely regrets that certain passages of his address could have sounded offensive to the sensitivities of the Muslim faithful and should have been interpreted in a manner that in no way corresponds to his intentions.

=== Comments by Patriarch Alexius II ===
On 5 December 2006, Patriarch Alexy II of the Russian Orthodox Church accused the Holy See of an "extremely unfriendly policy" when he said that the Catholic Church was poaching converts in Orthodox lands in Russia and other ex-Soviet republics. Bertone said in response: "We do not want to engage in proselytism in Russia".

=== Media ===
In 2007, Bertone "blasted the media for highlighting the Vatican's views on sex while maintaining a 'deafening silence' about charity work done by thousands of Catholic organisations around the world." He continued: "I see a fixation by some journalists on moral topics, such as abortion and homosexual unions, which are certainly important issues but absolutely do not constitute the thinking and work of the Church."

=== Proposed excommunication of drug dealers ===
On 14 January 2009, Bertone suggested that the church would consider taking much stronger action against drug dealers. This action might possibly include excommunication. He made a statement about the church's alarm at the "disaster" of drug-fuelled violence on the eve of a trip to Mexico.

=== Support for universal and free access to anti-HIV drugs ===
On 22 June 2012, in an online news story article by Cindy Wooden of Catholic News Service (CNS), it was reported that, in a conference in Rome on the prevention of the transmission of HIV (the virus that causes AIDS) from mothers to children sponsored by the lay Community of Sant'Egidio (which runs the DREAM project, a free HIV prevention/treatment program in 10 African countries), the Cardinal Secretary of State urged that full and easy access to antiretroviral drugs be made free worldwide (these are drugs, such as AZT, that can treat, and in some cases, can prevent people from getting, HIV; they do not presently cure HIV once it has infected someone). Bertone acknowledged that the only way this would be remotely feasible, especially in Africa – where the efforts would be most needed and focused – would be through a collaborative effort involving aid groups, governments, donors, medical groups, pharmaceutical companies, and churches.

=== Our Lady of Fatima ===
Bertone came under fire by Antonio Socci, Christopher Ferrara, and others for allegedly manipulating the "third secret" of Our Lady of Fatima. In a 2007 address on the release of his book (The Last Secret of Fatima), he emphasized the more private nature of apparitions, urged caution in accepting them, and said "the fullness of [Fatima's] message...touches the hearts of human beings, inviting them to conversion and to co-responsibility for the world's salvation".

=== Homosexuality to blame for child abuse by priests ===
On a visit to Chile in April 2010, Bertone commented on the psychology of child abusers, suggesting a predisposition between those that are homosexual to engage in child abuse:

Many psychologists, many psychiatrists have demonstrated that there is no relationship between celibacy and paedophilia but many others have demonstrated, I was told recently, that there is a relationship between homosexuality and paedophilia.

Gay rights groups condemned his remarks. The head of one gay rights organization said that for someone of Bertone's stature "to dump the blame on homosexuals ... says a lot about the current state of desperation in the Vatican".

=== Holocaust-denying bishop ===
In 1988 Bertone was appointed to a group of experts that assisted Joseph Ratzinger in negotiations with the excommunicated archbishop Marcel Lefebvre. In January 2009, Pope Benedict lifted the excommunication pronounced on four bishops created by Lefebvre as a gesture towards reconciliation. The same day, an interview on Swedish television was broadcast in which one of the bishops, Richard Williamson, supported ideas denying the Holocaust. An ensuing media uproar questioned why the Pope would welcome a Holocaust denier who had previously been accused of antisemitism. Both Cardinal Giovanni Battista Re, prefect of the congregation for bishops, who signed the decree and Cardinal Darío Castrillón Hoyos, president of the Pontifical Commission "Ecclesia Dei", which dealt with the followers of Lefebvre said that they were taken by surprise, and were never aware that Williamson was a Holocaust denier. As the Secretary of State has direct access to the pope, and oversees the implementation and coordination of his decisions, many in the media questioned why Bertone didn't ensure that an adequate background review was conducted, particularly as it would only have required an internet search. This gave the appearance of a disorganized curia.

=== Vatileaks ===
Bertone figured prominently in documents leaked to the media in which Bertone appears to have reproved the general secretary of the Vatican governorate, Archbishop Carlo Maria Viganò, for reporting detailed evidence of nepotism, cronyism, and general mismanagement. Viganò was subsequently transferred from the Vatican to Washington D.C. as apostolic nuncio.

Bertone blamed the scandal over leaked Vatican documents on unethical journalists and a spirit of hostility toward the Catholic Church. "Many journalists play at imitating Dan Brown", said Bertone, in an interview with the Italian magazine Famiglia Cristiana. "They continue to invent fables or repeat legends." Bertone made his remarks as Vatican judges were investigating leaks to Italian journalists of dozens of documents, including letters to the pope and encrypted cables from Vatican embassies around the world, several of which hint at power struggles among officials of the Holy See. "The truth is that there is a malicious will to produce division" among the collaborators of Pope Benedict XVI, he said.

During and after the Vatican leaks scandal, Bertone was widely blamed for cronyism, failing to address corruption, and failing to prevent many financial and ethical scandals under Benedict XVI.

=== Financial irregularities ===
During an inflight news conference on his return to Rome from the Holy Land in May 2014, Pope Francis confirmed reports the Vatican was investigating charges against its former secretary of state misappropriated $20 million from the Vatican bank. The pope also was asked about reports that Bertone mishandled 15 million euro (about $20.5 million) in funds held by the Institute for the Works of Religion, commonly known as the Vatican Bank. "It's something being studied, it's not clear," the Pope said. "Maybe it's the truth, but at this moment it's not definitive." This money was transferred to a private company, Lux Vide, when Bertone was in charge under Benedict XVI.

=== Apartment renovation ===
Between November 2013 and May 2014, Bertone combined and renovated two apartments in the San Carlo Palace in Vatican City to create a single residence for himself, a secretary, and three nuns, reportedly a total of 604-square-metre (6,500 sq ft) and a roof terrace. Bertone said he was renovating the apartment at his own expense, that it is half the size reported, and that Pope Francis telephoned him to express support when he was attacked in the press for expenditure. Bertone responded to reports that monies belonging to Bambino Gesù Hospital had been used for the construction work by donating 150,000 euros to the hospital.

On 13 July 2017, the Tribunal of the Vatican City State charged Giuseppe Profiti, former president of the hospital, and Massimo Spina, its former treasurer, with illicitly using 422,000 euros belonging to the hospital's foundation to renovate the apartment. Profiti said the monies were an investment that would enable the foundation to hold fundraising events at the property. No charges have been filed against either Bertone, the Castelli Re construction company or its owner, Gianantonio Bandera, a longtime Bertone associate who pocketed nearly a quarter-million euros for the whole project. After the trial's first hearing on 18 July, it was announced that the trial was adjourned until 7 September and that court officials were open to the possibility that Bertone could be summoned as a witness when the trial resumes.

On 7 September, the trial began and went into recess after one day when it was announced that new evidence emerged and the defense and the prosecution requested more time to study a memorandum from Bambino Gesu Hospital's current head given to the tribunal a day earlier emerged. Dates were set for the court to be in session again on 19, 20, 21 and 22 September, first to hear from the defendants themselves, and then from roughly 7 projected witnesses, four called by prosecutors and three by the two defense teams between 21 and 22 September. No details have emerged on whether or not Bertone will testify.

On 19 September, Profiti testified that hospital funds were used for the renovation with the idea that Cardinal Bertone could host intimate dinners for eight to ten wealthy potential donors at a time at least six times a year, though no meetings were ever reported to have been held in Bertone's apartment. On 22 September, an official of the Government of the Vatican City State testified that the remodeling project for Bertone's apartment bypassed the normal competitive bidding process and was "singular" and "anomalous". The same day, Spina testified that his immediate superior "told me there were no problems because Cardinal Bertone had clarified the situation with the Holy Father in person."

On 3 October 2017, Gianantonio Bandera, an Italian businessman whose now-bankrupt contracting firm renovated the apartment, said that Bertone personally oversaw the renovation and contacted him directly without taking bids, as would ordinarily be required.

The three-judge tribunal overseeing the trial later acquitted Spina and convicted Profiti of a lesser offense of abuse of office after the defense argued that the money was intended as an investment to benefit the hospital rather than Bertone's apartment.

=== Vatican response to lavish lifestyle ===
On 15 February 2018, Pope Francis ordered Vatican officials and bishops to lead simple lives and renounce any desire for power after they retired from senior positions. A number of Vatican officials and bishops, including Bertone, had come under fire in recent years for holding on to luxuries, such as large apartments and in some cases even police escorts, after they left office. Aside from the controversy surrounding his apartment, Bertone was also seen using escorts of Vatican and Italian police to move around Rome even after he retired.

=== McCarrick sex abuse ===
Restrictions Bertone and other Vatican officials placed on former cardinal Theodore McCarrick after the allegations of sex abuse surfaced also went unenforced. On 28 May 2019 a letter from September 2008 was published, which revealed that McCarrick told Bertone that he had slept with adult seminarians, while denying sexual relations.

== Retirement ==
Bertone's retirement as Secretary of State was announced on 31 August 2013 and became effective on 15 October. Pope Francis designated Pietro Parolin as his successor.

A few weeks after Bertone turned 80, Pope Francis named Cardinal Jean-Louis Tauran to replace him as Camerlengo of the Holy Roman Church on 20 December 2014.

In an interview in 2015 Bertone said that he was not surprised by the resignation of Pope Benedict: "I had guessed it, but put it out my thoughts. I knew long in advance, at least seven months before. And I had many doubts. We debated the topic at length after it seemed already decided. I told him: Holy Father, you must bestow upon us the third volume on Jesus of Nazareth and the encyclopedia of faith, before you sign things over to Pope Francis".

== Distinctions ==
In February 2010, President Lech Kaczyński of Poland conferred on Bertone the country's highest decoration for foreign nationals, the Grand Cross of the Order of Merit of Poland, "for the lofty merits acquired in the development of the collaboration between the Republic of Poland and the Holy See and for the work carried out in favor of the Church in Poland."

Bertone also received the Gaudium et Spes Award at the Knights of Columbus Supreme Convention in 2007.

== Notes ==
Catholic Church titles
| Preceded by Roberto Giannatelli | Rector Magnificus of Salesian Pontifical University; 1 June 1989 – 4 June 1991 | Succeeded by Raffaele Farina |
| Preceded by Albino Mensa | Roman Catholic Archbishop of Vercelli; 4 June 1991 – 13 June 1995 | Succeeded by Enrico Masseroni |
| Preceded by Alberto Bovone | Secretary of the Congregation for the Doctrine of the Faith; 13 June 1995 – 10 December 2002 | Succeeded by Angelo Amato |
| Preceded by Dionigi Tettamanzi | Roman Catholic Archbishop of Genoa; 10 December 2002 – 15 September 2006 | Succeeded by Angelo Bagnasco |
| Preceded by Pio Laghi | Cardinal Priest of Santa Maria Ausiliatrice in Via Tuscolana; 21 October 2003 – 10 May 2008 | Succeeded by Paolo Sardi |
| Preceded by Angelo Sodano | Cardinal Secretary of State; 15 September 2006 – 15 October 2013 | Succeeded by Pietro Parolin |
| Preceded by Eduardo Martínez Somalo | Camerlengo of the Holy Roman Church; 4 April 2007 – 20 December 2014 | Succeeded by Jean-Louis Tauran |
| Preceded by Alfonso López Trujillo | Cardinal Bishop of Frascati; 10 May 2008 – present | Incumbent |
