= Cardinal electors in the 2013 conclave =

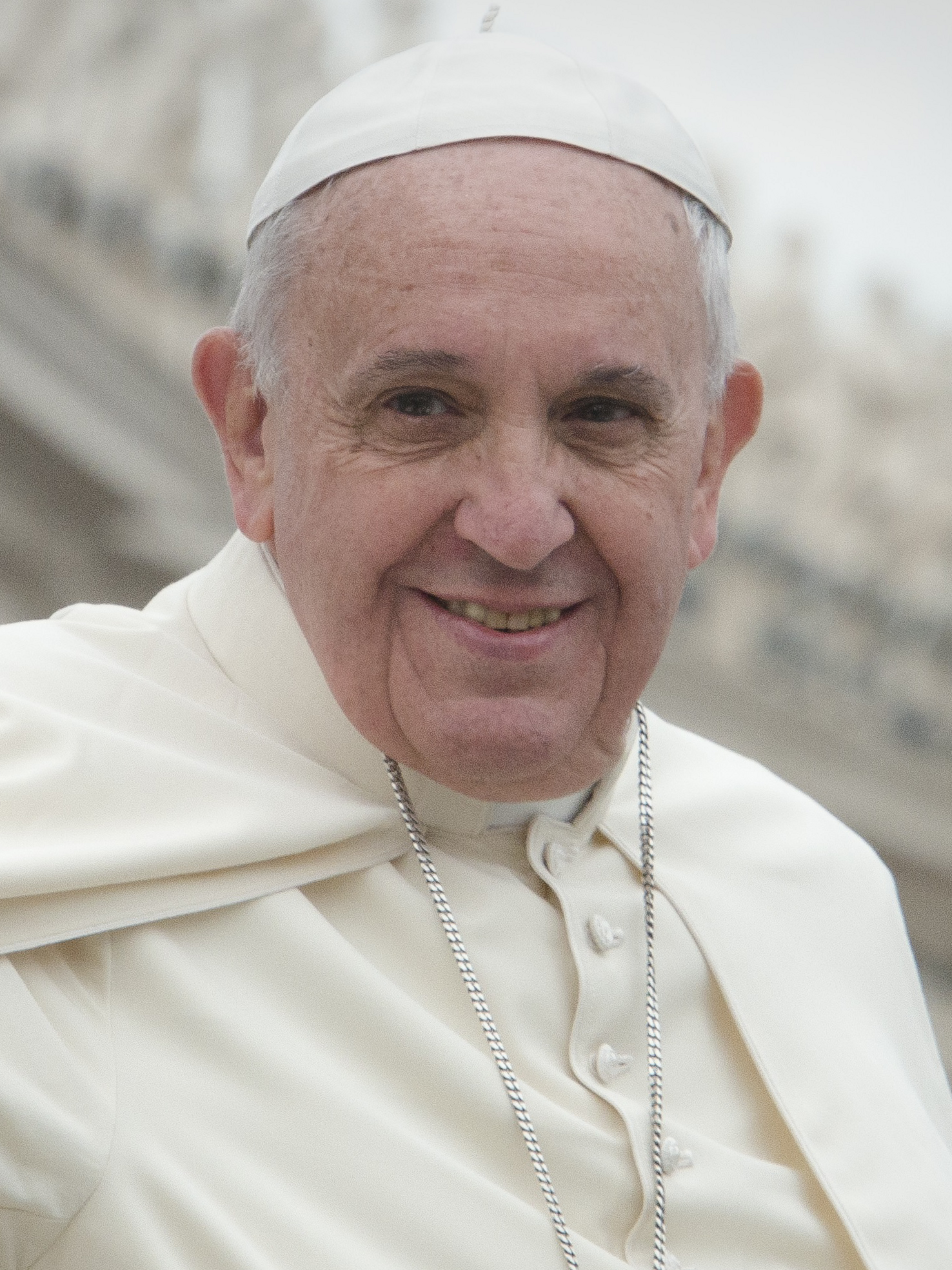
Cardinal Jorge Mario Bergoglio was elected Pope Francis by the conclave on 13 March 2013.

The papal conclave of 2013 was convened to elect a pope, the leader of the Catholic Church, to succeed Benedict XVI following his resignation on 28 February 2013. In accordance with the apostolic constitution Universi Dominici gregis, which governed the vacancy of the Holy See, only cardinals who had not passed their 80th birthday on the day on which the Holy See became vacant (in this case, those who were born on or after 28 February 1933) were eligible to participate in the conclave. Although not a formal requirement, the cardinal electors almost always elect the pope from among their number. The election was carried out by secret ballot (Latin: per scrutinium).

Of the 207 members of the College of Cardinals at the time of Benedict XVI's resignation, 117 cardinal electors were eligible to participate in the subsequent conclave. (Note: Excluding Cardinal Jean Honoré, who died on 28 February 2013, the same day as Benedict XVI's resignation) Two cardinal electors did not participate, decreasing the number of participants to 115. The required two-thirds supermajority needed to elect a pope was 77 votes.

Of the 115 attending cardinal electors, 4 were cardinal bishops, 81 were cardinal priests, and 30 were cardinal deacons; 48 had been created cardinals by Pope John Paul II and 67 by Pope Benedict XVI; 29 worked in the service of the Holy See (such as in the Roman Curia), 61 were in pastoral ministry outside Rome, and 25 had retired. The oldest cardinal elector in the conclave was Walter Kasper, at the age of 79, (Note: Kasper turned 80 on 5 March 2013, before the conclave began; he had not passed his 80th birthday at the time of Benedict XVI's resignation and was therefore eligible to participate.) and the youngest was Baselios Cleemis Thottunkal, at the age of 53. Another 90 cardinals were ineligible to participate in the conclave for reasons of age.

The cardinal electors entered the Sistine Chapel to begin the conclave on 12 March 2013. On 13 March, after five ballots over two days, they elected Cardinal Jorge Bergoglio, the archbishop of Buenos Aires, who took the papal name Francis.

== Cardinal electors ==
The College of Cardinals is divided into three orders – cardinal bishops (CB), cardinal priests (CP), and cardinal deacons (CD) – with formal precedence in that sequence. This determines the order in which the cardinal electors process into the conclave, take the oath, and cast their ballots. For cardinal bishops (except the Eastern Catholic patriarchs), the dean of the College of Cardinals is first in precedence, followed by the vice-dean, (Note: Neither the dean (Angelo Sodano) nor the vice-dean (Roger Etchegaray) were under the age of 80 and eligible to participate in the conclave.) and then by the remainder in order of appointment as cardinal bishops. For cardinal bishops who are Eastern Catholic patriarchs, for cardinal priests, and for cardinal deacons, precedence is determined by the date of the consistory in which they were created cardinals and then by the order in which they appeared in the official announcement or bulletin.

Four of the cardinal electors were from the Eastern Catholic Churches: Antonios Naguib (Coptic), Béchara Boutros Raï (Maronite), George Alencherry (Syro-Malabar), and Baselios Cleemis Thottunkal (Syro-Malankara). Raï and Thottunkal were the first cardinals from their respective churches to participate in a conclave. The senior cardinal bishop, the senior cardinal priest, the senior cardinal deacon, and the junior cardinal deacon, who were assigned specific roles in the conclave, such as presiding over the conclave itself (the senior cardinal bishop) or announcing the election of the pope (the senior cardinal deacon), were, respectively, Giovanni Battista Re, Godfried Danneels, Jean-Louis Tauran, and James Michael Harvey. The camerlengo of the Holy Roman Church, who was in charge of administering the Holy See during its vacancy, was Tarcisio Bertone.

The data below are as of 28 February 2013, the date on which the Holy See became vacant. All cardinals are of the Latin Church unless otherwise stated. Cardinals belonging to institutes of consecrated life or to societies of apostolic life are indicated by the relevant post-nominal letters.

* Elected pope

Rank	Name	Country	Born	Order	Consistory	Office	Ref.
1	Giovanni Battista Re	Italy	30 January 1934 (age 79)	CB	21 February 2001; John Paul II	Prefect emeritus of the Congregation for Bishops	
2	Tarcisio Bertone SDB	Italy	2 December 1934 (age 78)	CB	21 October 2003; John Paul II	Secretary of State and Camerlengo of the Holy Roman Church	
3	Antonios Naguib	Egypt	18 March 1935 (age 77)	CB	20 November 2010; Benedict XVI	Patriarch emeritus of Alexandria (Coptic Church)	
4	Béchara Boutros Raï OMM	Lebanon	25 February 1940 (age 73)	CB	24 November 2012; Benedict XVI	Patriarch of Antioch (Maronite Church)	
5	Godfried Danneels	Belgium	4 June 1933 (age 79)	CP	2 February 1983; John Paul II	Archbishop emeritus of Mechelen–Brussels	
6	Joachim Meisner	Germany	25 December 1933 (age 79)	CP	2 February 1983; John Paul II	Archbishop of Cologne	
7	Nicolás de Jesús López Rodríguez	Dominican Republic	31 October 1936 (age 76)	CP	28 June 1991; John Paul II	Archbishop of Santo Domingo	
8	Roger Michael Mahony	United States	27 February 1936 (age 77)	CP	28 June 1991; John Paul II	Archbishop emeritus of Los Angeles	
9	Jaime Lucas Ortega y Alamino	Cuba	18 October 1936 (age 76)	CP	26 November 1994; John Paul II	Archbishop of San Cristóbal de la Habana	
10	Jean-Claude Turcotte	Canada	26 June 1936 (age 76)	CP	26 November 1994; John Paul II	Archbishop emeritus of Montreal	
11	Vinko Puljić	Bosnia and Herzegovina	8 September 1945 (age 67)	CP	26 November 1994; John Paul II	Archbishop of Vrhbosna	
12	Juan Sandoval Íñiguez	Mexico	28 March 1933 (age 79)	CP	26 November 1994; John Paul II	Archbishop emeritus of Guadalajara	
13	Antonio María Rouco Varela	Spain	20 August 1936 (age 76)	CP	21 February 1998; John Paul II	Archbishop of Madrid	
14	Dionigi Tettamanzi	Italy	14 March 1934 (age 78)	CP	21 February 1998; John Paul II	Archbishop emeritus of Milan	
15	Polycarp Pengo	Tanzania	5 August 1944 (age 68)	CP	21 February 1998; John Paul II	Archbishop of Dar-es-Salaam	
16	Christoph Schönborn OP	Austria	22 January 1945 (age 68)	CP	21 February 1998; John Paul II	Archbishop of Vienna	
17	Norberto Rivera Carrera	Mexico	6 June 1942 (age 70)	CP	21 February 1998; John Paul II	Archbishop of Mexico	
18	Francis Eugene George OMI	United States	16 January 1937 (age 76)	CP	21 February 1998; John Paul II	Archbishop of Chicago	
19	Zenon Grocholewski	Poland	11 October 1939 (age 73)	CP	21 February 2001; John Paul II	Prefect of the Congregation for Catholic Education	
20	Crescenzio Sepe	Italy	2 June 1943 (age 69)	CP	21 February 2001; John Paul II	Archbishop of Naples	
21	Walter Kasper	Germany	5 March 1933 (age 79)	CP	21 February 2001; John Paul II	President emeritus of the Pontifical Council for Promoting Christian Unity	
22	Ivan Dias	India	14 April 1936 (age 76)	CP	21 February 2001; John Paul II	Prefect emeritus of the Congregation for the Evangelization of Peoples	
23	Geraldo Majella Agnelo	Brazil	19 October 1933 (age 79)	CP	21 February 2001; John Paul II	Archbishop emeritus of São Salvador da Bahia	
24	Audrys Juozas Bačkis	Lithuania	1 February 1937 (age 76)	CP	21 February 2001; John Paul II	Archbishop of Vilnius	
25	Francisco Javier Errázuriz Ossa ISch	Chile	5 September 1933 (age 79)	CP	21 February 2001; John Paul II	Archbishop emeritus of Santiago de Chile	
26	Julio Terrazas Sandoval CSsR	Bolivia	7 March 1936 (age 76)	CP	21 February 2001; John Paul II	Archbishop of Santa Cruz de la Sierra	
27	Wilfrid Fox Napier OFM	South Africa	8 March 1941 (age 71)	CP	21 February 2001; John Paul II	Archbishop of Durban	
28	Óscar Andrés Rodríguez Maradiaga SDB	Honduras	29 December 1942 (age 70)	CP	21 February 2001; John Paul II	Archbishop of Tegucigalpa	
29	Juan Luis Cipriani Thorne	Peru	28 December 1943 (age 69)	CP	21 February 2001; John Paul II	Archbishop of Lima	
30	Cláudio Hummes OFM	Brazil	8 August 1934 (age 78)	CP	21 February 2001; John Paul II	Prefect emeritus of the Congregation for the Clergy	
31	Jorge Bergoglio SJ*	Argentina	17 December 1936 (age 76)	CP	21 February 2001; John Paul II	Archbishop of Buenos Aires	
32	José da Cruz Policarpo	Portugal	26 February 1936 (age 77)	CP	21 February 2001; John Paul II	Patriarch of Lisbon	
33	Severino Poletto	Italy	18 March 1933 (age 79)	CP	21 February 2001; John Paul II	Archbishop emeritus of Turin	
34	Karl Lehmann	Germany	16 May 1936 (age 76)	CP	21 February 2001; John Paul II	Bishop of Mainz	
35	Angelo Scola	Italy	7 November 1941 (age 71)	CP	21 October 2003; John Paul II	Archbishop of Milan	
36	Anthony Olubunmi Okogie	Nigeria	16 June 1936 (age 76)	CP	21 October 2003; John Paul II	Archbishop emeritus of Lagos	
37	Gabriel Zubeir Wako	Sudan	27 February 1941 (age 72)	CP	21 October 2003; John Paul II	Archbishop of Khartoum	
38	Carlos Amigo Vallejo OFM	Spain	23 August 1934 (age 78)	CP	21 October 2003; John Paul II	Archbishop emeritus of Seville	
39	Justin Francis Rigali	United States	19 April 1935 (age 77)	CP	21 October 2003; John Paul II	Archbishop emeritus of Philadelphia	
40	Ennio Antonelli	Italy	18 November 1936 (age 76)	CP	21 October 2003; John Paul II	President emeritus of the Pontifical Council for the Family	
41	Peter Kodwo Appiah Turkson	Ghana	11 October 1948 (age 64)	CP	21 October 2003; John Paul II	President of the Pontifical Council for Justice and Peace	
42	Telesphore Placidus Toppo	India	15 October 1939 (age 73)	CP	21 October 2003; John Paul II	Archbishop of Ranchi	
43	George Pell	Australia	8 June 1941 (age 71)	CP	21 October 2003; John Paul II	Archbishop of Sydney	
44	Josip Bozanić	Croatia	20 March 1949 (age 63)	CP	21 October 2003; John Paul II	Archbishop of Zagreb	
45	Jean-Baptiste Phạm Minh Mẫn	Vietnam	5 March 1934 (age 78)	CP	21 October 2003; John Paul II	Archbishop of Ho Chi Minh City	
46	Philippe Barbarin	France	17 October 1950 (age 62)	CP	21 October 2003; John Paul II	Archbishop of Lyon	
47	Péter Erdő	Hungary	25 June 1952 (age 60)	CP	21 October 2003; John Paul II	Archbishop of Esztergom–Budapest	
48	Marc Ouellet PSS	Canada	8 June 1944 (age 68)	CP	21 October 2003; John Paul II	Prefect of the Congregation for Bishops	
49	Agostino Vallini	Italy	17 April 1940 (age 72)	CP	24 March 2006; Benedict XVI	Vicar General for Rome and Archpriest of the Papal Basilica of Saint John Lateran	
50	Jorge Liberato Urosa Savino	Venezuela	28 August 1942 (age 70)	CP	24 March 2006; Benedict XVI	Archbishop of Caracas	
51	Jean-Pierre Ricard	France	25 September 1944 (age 68)	CP	24 March 2006; Benedict XVI	Archbishop of Bordeaux	
52	Antonio Cañizares Llovera	Spain	15 October 1945 (age 67)	CP	24 March 2006; Benedict XVI	Prefect of the Congregation for Divine Worship and the Discipline of the Sacraments	
53	Seán Patrick O'Malley OFMCap	United States	29 June 1944 (age 68)	CP	24 March 2006; Benedict XVI	Archbishop of Boston	
54	Stanisław Dziwisz	Poland	27 April 1939 (age 73)	CP	24 March 2006; Benedict XVI	Archbishop of Kraków	
55	Carlo Caffarra	Italy	1 June 1938 (age 74)	CP	24 March 2006; Benedict XVI	Archbishop of Bologna	
56	Seán Baptist Brady	Ireland	16 August 1939 (age 73)	CP	24 November 2007; Benedict XVI	Archbishop of Armagh	
57	Lluís Martínez Sistach	Spain	29 April 1937 (age 75)	CP	24 November 2007; Benedict XVI	Archbishop of Barcelona	
58	André Vingt-Trois	France	7 November 1942 (age 70)	CP	24 November 2007; Benedict XVI	Archbishop of Paris	
59	Angelo Bagnasco	Italy	14 January 1943 (age 70)	CP	24 November 2007; Benedict XVI	Archbishop of Genoa	
60	Théodore-Adrien Sarr	Senegal	28 November 1936 (age 76)	CP	24 November 2007; Benedict XVI	Archbishop of Dakar	
61	Oswald Gracias	India	24 December 1944 (age 68)	CP	24 November 2007; Benedict XVI	Archbishop of Bombay	
62	Francisco Robles Ortega	Mexico	2 March 1949 (age 63)	CP	24 November 2007; Benedict XVI	Archbishop of Guadalajara	
63	Daniel Nicholas DiNardo	United States	23 May 1949 (age 63)	CP	24 November 2007; Benedict XVI	Archbishop of Galveston–Houston	
64	Odilo Pedro Scherer	Brazil	21 September 1949 (age 63)	CP	24 November 2007; Benedict XVI	Archbishop of São Paulo	
65	John Njue	Kenya	1 January 1946 (Note: The Holy See Press Office's documentation gives Njue's date of birth as 1 January 1946, but previously stated that he was "born in 1944" and used 31 December 1944 as his date of birth on its list of cardinal electors.) (age 67)	CP	24 November 2007; Benedict XVI	Archbishop of Nairobi	
66	Raúl Eduardo Vela Chiriboga	Ecuador	1 January 1934 (age 79)	CP	20 November 2010; Benedict XVI	Archbishop emeritus of Quito	
67	Laurent Monsengwo Pasinya	DR Congo	7 October 1939 (age 73)	CP	20 November 2010; Benedict XVI	Archbishop of Kinshasa	
68	Paolo Romeo	Italy	20 February 1938 (age 75)	CP	20 November 2010; Benedict XVI	Archbishop of Palermo	
69	Donald William Wuerl	United States	12 November 1940 (age 72)	CP	20 November 2010; Benedict XVI	Archbishop of Washington	
70	Raymundo Damasceno Assis	Brazil	15 February 1937 (age 76)	CP	20 November 2010; Benedict XVI	Archbishop of Aparecida	
71	Kazimierz Nycz	Poland	1 February 1950 (age 63)	CP	20 November 2010; Benedict XVI	Archbishop of Warsaw	
72	Albert Malcolm Ranjith Patabendige Don	Sri Lanka	15 November 1947 (age 65)	CP	20 November 2010; Benedict XVI	Archbishop of Colombo	
73	Reinhard Marx	Germany	21 September 1953 (age 59)	CP	20 November 2010; Benedict XVI	Archbishop of Munich and Freising	
74	George Alencherry	India	19 April 1945 (age 67)	CP	18 February 2012; Benedict XVI	Major Archbishop of Ernakulam–Angamaly (Syro-Malabar Church)	
75	Thomas Christopher Collins	Canada	16 January 1947 (age 66)	CP	18 February 2012; Benedict XVI	Archbishop of Toronto	
76	Dominik Duka OP	Czech Republic	26 April 1943 (age 69)	CP	18 February 2012; Benedict XVI	Archbishop of Prague	
77	Willem Jacobus Eijk	Netherlands	22 June 1953 (age 59)	CP	18 February 2012; Benedict XVI	Archbishop of Utrecht	
78	Giuseppe Betori	Italy	25 February 1947 (age 66)	CP	18 February 2012; Benedict XVI	Archbishop of Florence	
79	Timothy Michael Dolan	United States	6 February 1950 (age 63)	CP	18 February 2012; Benedict XVI	Archbishop of New York	
80	Rainer Maria Woelki	Germany	18 August 1956 (age 56)	CP	18 February 2012; Benedict XVI	Archbishop of Berlin	
81	John Tong Hon	China (Hong Kong) (Note: Hong Kong is a special administrative region of China.)	31 July 1939 (age 73)	CP	18 February 2012; Benedict XVI	Bishop of Hong Kong	
82	Baselios Cleemis Thottunkal	India	15 June 1959 (age 53)	CP	24 November 2012; Benedict XVI	Major Archbishop of Trivandrum (Syro-Malankara Church)	
83	John Olorunfemi Onaiyekan	Nigeria	29 January 1944 (age 69)	CP	24 November 2012; Benedict XVI	Archbishop of Abuja	
84	Rubén Salazar Gómez	Colombia	22 September 1942 (age 70)	CP	24 November 2012; Benedict XVI	Archbishop of Bogotá	
85	Luis Antonio Gokim Tagle	Philippines	21 June 1957 (age 55)	CP	24 November 2012; Benedict XVI	Archbishop of Manila	
86	Jean-Louis Tauran	France	5 April 1943 (age 69)	CD	21 October 2003; John Paul II	President of the Pontifical Council for Interreligious Dialogue (Protodeacon)	
87	Attilio Nicora	Italy	16 March 1937 (age 75)	CD	21 October 2003; John Paul II	Pontifical Legate for the Basilicas of Saint Francis and Saint Mary of the Angels in Assisi and President of the Financial Information Authority	
88	William Joseph Levada	United States	15 June 1936 (age 76)	CD	24 March 2006; Benedict XVI	Prefect emeritus of the Congregation for the Doctrine of the Faith	
89	Franc Rodé CM	Slovenia	23 September 1934 (age 78)	CD	24 March 2006; Benedict XVI	Prefect emeritus of the Congregation for Institutes of Consecrated Life and Societies of Apostolic Life	
90	Leonardo Sandri	Argentina	18 November 1943 (age 69)	CD	24 November 2007; Benedict XVI	Prefect of the Congregation for the Oriental Churches	
91	Giovanni Lajolo	Italy	3 January 1935 (age 78)	CD	24 November 2007; Benedict XVI	President emeritus of the Pontifical Commission for Vatican City State	
92	Paul Josef Cordes	Germany	5 September 1934 (age 78)	CD	24 November 2007; Benedict XVI	President emeritus of the Pontifical Council Cor Unum	
93	Angelo Comastri	Italy	17 September 1943 (age 69)	CD	24 November 2007; Benedict XVI	Vicar General for Vatican City, Archpriest of the Papal Basilica of Saint Peter and President of the Fabric of Saint Peter	
94	Stanisław Ryłko	Poland	4 July 1945 (age 67)	CD	24 November 2007; Benedict XVI	President of the Pontifical Council for the Laity	
95	Raffaele Farina SDB	Italy	24 September 1933 (age 79)	CD	24 November 2007; Benedict XVI	Archivist and Librarian emeritus of the Holy Roman Church	
96	Angelo Amato SDB	Italy	8 June 1938 (age 74)	CD	20 November 2010; Benedict XVI	Prefect of the Congregation for the Causes of Saints	
97	Robert Sarah	Guinea	15 June 1945 (age 67)	CD	20 November 2010; Benedict XVI	President of the Pontifical Council Cor Unum	
98	Francesco Monterisi	Italy	28 May 1934 (age 78)	CD	20 November 2010; Benedict XVI	Archpriest emeritus of the Papal Basilica of Saint Paul Outside the Walls	
99	Raymond Leo Burke	United States	30 June 1948 (age 64)	CD	20 November 2010; Benedict XVI	Prefect of the Supreme Tribunal of the Apostolic Signatura	
100	Kurt Koch	Switzerland	15 March 1950 (age 62)	CD	20 November 2010; Benedict XVI	President of the Pontifical Council for Promoting Christian Unity	
101	Paolo Sardi	Italy	1 September 1934 (age 78)	CD	20 November 2010; Benedict XVI	Patron of the Sovereign Military Order of Malta	
102	Mauro Piacenza	Italy	15 September 1944 (age 68)	CD	20 November 2010; Benedict XVI	Prefect of the Congregation for the Clergy	
103	Velasio De Paolis CS	Italy	19 September 1935 (age 77)	CD	20 November 2010; Benedict XVI	President emeritus of the Prefecture for the Economic Affairs of the Holy See	
104	Gianfranco Ravasi	Italy	18 October 1942 (age 70)	CD	20 November 2010; Benedict XVI	President of the Pontifical Council for Culture	
105	Fernando Filoni	Italy	15 April 1946 (age 66)	CD	18 February 2012; Benedict XVI	Prefect of the Congregation for the Evangelization of Peoples	
106	Manuel Monteiro de Castro	Portugal	29 March 1938 (age 74)	CD	18 February 2012; Benedict XVI	Major Penitentiary	
107	Santos Abril y Castelló	Spain	21 September 1935 (age 77)	CD	18 February 2012; Benedict XVI	Archpriest of the Papal Basilica of Saint Mary Major	
108	Antonio Maria Vegliò	Italy	3 February 1938 (age 75)	CD	18 February 2012; Benedict XVI	President of the Pontifical Council for the Pastoral Care of Migrants and Itinerant People	
109	Giuseppe Bertello	Italy	1 October 1942 (age 70)	CD	18 February 2012; Benedict XVI	President of the Pontifical Commission for Vatican City State	
110	Francesco Coccopalmerio	Italy	6 March 1938 (age 74)	CD	18 February 2012; Benedict XVI	President of the Pontifical Council for Legislative Texts	
111	João Braz de Aviz	Brazil	24 April 1947 (age 65)	CD	18 February 2012; Benedict XVI	Prefect of the Congregation for Institutes of Consecrated Life and Societies of Apostolic Life	
112	Edwin Frederick O'Brien	United States	8 April 1939 (age 73)	CD	18 February 2012; Benedict XVI	Grand Master of the Order of the Holy Sepulchre	
113	Domenico Calcagno	Italy	3 February 1943 (age 70)	CD	18 February 2012; Benedict XVI	President of the Administration of the Patrimony of the Apostolic See	
114	Giuseppe Versaldi	Italy	30 July 1943 (age 69)	CD	18 February 2012; Benedict XVI	President of the Prefecture for the Economic Affairs of the Holy See	
115	James Michael Harvey	United States	20 October 1949 (age 63)	CD	24 November 2012; Benedict XVI	Archpriest of the Papal Basilica of Saint Paul Outside the Walls	

=== Not in attendance ===
Rank	Name	Country	Born	Order	Consistory	Office	Reason for absence	Refs.
1	Julius Riyadi Darmaatmadja SJ	Indonesia	20 December 1934 (age 78)	CP	26 November 1994; John Paul II	Archbishop emeritus of Jakarta	Health (deteriorating eyesight)	
2	Keith Michael Patrick O'Brien	United Kingdom	17 March 1938 (age 74)	CP	21 October 2003; John Paul II	Archbishop emeritus of Saint Andrews and Edinburgh	Personal (following allegations of sexual misconduct)	

== Cardinal electors by continent and country ==
The 115 attending cardinal electors represented 48 countries on all six inhabited continents. (Note: 50 countries, if including non-attending cardinal electors) The countries with the greatest number of cardinal electors were Italy (twenty-eight), the United States (eleven), and Germany (six).

Choropleth map indicating the number of cardinal electors in attendance from each country (unnumbered countries denote one cardinal elector)

* Continent or country of elected pope

Cardinal electors by continent
Continent	Number	Percentage
Africa	11	9.6%
North America	20	17.4%
South America*	13	11.3%
Asia	10	8.7%
Europe	60	52.2%
Oceania	1	0.9%
Total	115	100.0%

Cardinal electors by country
Country	Continent	Number
Argentina*	South America	2
Australia	Oceania	1
Austria	Europe	1
Belgium	Europe	1
Bolivia	South America	1
Bosnia and Herzegovina	Europe	1
Brazil	South America	5
Canada	North America	3
Chile	South America	1
China (Hong Kong)	Asia	1
Colombia	South America	1
DR Congo	Africa	1
Croatia	Europe	1
Cuba	North America	1
Czech Republic	Europe	1
Dominican Republic	North America	1
Ecuador	South America	1
Egypt	Africa	1
France	Europe	4
Germany	Europe	6
Ghana	Africa	1
Guinea	Africa	1
Honduras	North America	1
Hungary	Europe	1
India	Asia	5
Ireland	Europe	1
Italy	Europe	28
Kenya	Africa	1
Lebanon	Asia	1
Lithuania	Europe	1
Mexico	North America	3
Netherlands	Europe	1
Nigeria	Africa	2
Peru	South America	1
Philippines	Asia	1
Poland	Europe	4
Portugal	Europe	2
Senegal	Africa	1
Slovenia	Europe	1
South Africa	Africa	1
Spain	Europe	5
Sri Lanka	Asia	1
Sudan	Africa	1
Switzerland	Europe	1
Tanzania	Africa	1
United States	North America	11
Venezuela	South America	1
Vietnam	Asia	1
Total		115

== See also ==
- Cardinals created by John Paul II
- Cardinals created by Benedict XVI
- Cardinal electors in the 2005 conclave
- Cardinal electors in the 2025 conclave
- List of current cardinals
