= Agostino Vallini =

Italian prelate of the Catholic Church (born 1940)

His Eminence Agostino Vallini
- Cardinal, Vicar Emeritus of Rome
- Appointed: 27 June 2008
- Term ended: 26 May 2017
- Predecessor: Camillo Ruini
- Successor: Angelo De Donatis
- Other posts: Cardinal-Priest of San Pier Damiani ai Monti di San Paolo; Archpriest of the Archbasilica of St. John Lateran; Member of Council for the Economy
- Previous posts: Auxiliary Bishop of Naples (1989–1999); Titular Bishop of Tortibulum (1989–1999); Bishop of Albano (1999–2004); Prefect of the Apostolic Signatura (2004–2008); Vicar General of Rome (2008–2017); Pontifical Legation for the Basilicas of Saint Francis and Saint Mary of the Angels in Assisi (2017-2025)

Orders
- Ordination: 19 July 1964 by Vittorio Longo
- Consecration: 13 May 1989 by Michele Giordano
- Created cardinal: 24 March 2006 by Benedict XVI
- Rank: Cardinal-Priest

Personal details
- Born: 17 April 1940 (age 86) Poli, Lazio, Italy
- Denomination: Roman Catholic
- Motto: Sequere me (Latin for 'Follow me')
- Coat of arms

Styles of Agostino Vallini
- Reference style: His Eminence
- Spoken style: Your Eminence
- Informal style: Cardinal

Agostino Vallini (born 17 April 1940) is an Italian prelate of the Catholic Church. He has been a cardinal since 2006. From 2008 to 2017, he served as Vicar General of Rome. He is also the Archpriest emeritus of the Archbasilica of St. John Lateran.

== Biography ==
Agostino Vallini was born in Poli, near Rome, but moved with his family to Barra, near Naples, as a child. He studied at the Major Archiepiscopal Seminary of Naples and the Pontifical Theological Seminary of Southern Italy, where he obtained his licentiate in theology. Vallini also attended the Pontifical Lateran University in Rome, earning his doctorate in canon and civil law with a dissertation on the new Code of Canon Law.

He was ordained to the priesthood by Bishop Vittorio Longo on 19 July 1964. He then taught canon law at his alma mater, the Theological Faculty of Southern Italy. From 1971 to 1978 he taught ecclesiastical law at the Pontifical Lateran University, while also serving as adviser for the Italian Catholic University Federation, the movement Seguimi, and the Union of Major Religious Superiors of Italy. He later became Rector of the Major Archiepiscopal Seminary of Naples and Regional Counselor of Catholic Action. On his return to Naples in 1978 he became rector of the major seminary until 1987, when he took up the post of dean of the S. Tommaso d'Aquino campus, where he had continued to teach.

On 23 March 1989, Vallini was appointed Auxiliary Bishop of Naples and Titular Bishop of Tortibulum by Pope John Paul II. He received his episcopal consecration on the following 13 May from Cardinal Michele Giordano, with Archbishops Luigi Diligenza and Antonio Ambrosanio serving as co-consecrators, in the Cathedral of Naples. Vallini was named Diocesan Bishop of Albano on 13 November 1999. On 27 May 2004, he was appointed Prefect of the Apostolic Signatura. As prefect of the Signatura, he served as the highest judicial authority beneath the Pope in the Church.

Upon the death of John Paul II on 2 April 2005, Vallini and all major Vatican officials automatically lost their positions. He was confirmed as Prefect of the Apostolic Signatura by Pope Benedict XVI on 21 April. Pope Benedict created him Cardinal-Deacon of S. Pier Damiani ai Monti di S. Paolo in the consistory of 24 March 2006.

Vallini was appointed Vicar General of His Holiness for the Diocese of Rome on 27 June 2008, succeeding Camillo Ruini. As Vicar General, he was responsible for the diocese of Rome on behalf of the pope. He was also Archpriest of the Lateran Basilica and Grand Chancellor of the Pontifical Lateran University.

Vallini serves as a member of the Congregation for the Causes of Saints; Congregation for Bishops; Congregation for Institutes of Consecrated Life and Societies of Apostolic Life; Congregation for the Evangelization of Peoples. He also serves as a member of the Pontifical Council for Legislative Texts and the Administration of the Patrimony of the Apostolic See and Council of Cardinals for Study of Organizational and Economic Affairs of the Holy See. He can hold these memberships until his 80th birthday.

On 18 September 2012, Pope Benedict XVI named Vallini one of the Synod Fathers of the Synod of Bishops on the New Evangelization.

He was one of the cardinal electors who participated in the 2013 papal conclave that elected Pope Francis.

On 26 March 2017 Pope Francis accepted his resignation as Vicar of Rome and Archpriest of St. John Lateran. On 30 September Francis named him a member of the Supreme Tribunal of the Apostolic Signatura.

On 4 November 2017, Pope Francis appointed Cardinal Vallini Pontifical Legate for the Basilicas of Saint Francis of Assisi and Saint Mary of the Angels, both in Assisi, Italy. His responsibilities ended upon the appointment of Cardinal Ángel Fernández Artime to succeed him in that position on 16 July 2025.

== Views ==
=== AIDS and contraception ===
Distributing condoms in schools in the context of combating AIDS trivializes sexuality and education and must be fought by concerned parents, according to Vallini. In an official statement, he responded to a decision by the civil authorities of the province of Rome to allow the distribution of condoms from vending machines in high schools (see religion and AIDS).

Catholic Church titles
Preceded by Sergio Adolfo Govi, O.F.M. Cap.	Titular bishop of Tortibulum; 23 March 1989 – 13 November 1999	Succeeded by Joseph Vu Duy Thong
Preceded by Dante Bernini	Bishop of Albano Laziale; 13 November 1999 – 27 May 2004	Succeeded by Marcello Semeraro
Preceded by Mario Francesco Pompedda	Prefect of the Supreme Tribunal of the Apostolic Signatura; 27 May 2004 – 27 June 2008	Succeeded by Raymond Leo Burke
Preceded by Camillo Ruini	Vicar General for the Diocese of Rome; 27 June 2008–29 June 2017	Succeeded by Angelo De Donatis
Preceded by Camillo Ruini	Archpriest of the Basilica of St. John Lateran; 27 June 2008–29 June 2017	Succeeded by Angelo De Donatis
Preceded by Camillo Ruini	Grand Chancellor of the Pontifical Lateran University; 27 June 2008–29 June 2017	Succeeded by Angelo De Donatis
Preceded by Attilio Nicora	Pontifical Legate for the Basilicas of Saint Francis and Saint Mary of the Angels in Assisi; 4 November 2017–16 July 2025	Succeeded by Ángel Fernández Artime
