= Santa Maria Ausiliatrice, Rome =

Roman Catholic basilica, a landmark of Rome, Italy

The Church of Holy Mary, the Help of Christians in Tusculum Road
- Santa Maria Ausiliatrice in Via Tuscolana; Sancta Mariae Auxiliatricis in via Tusculana
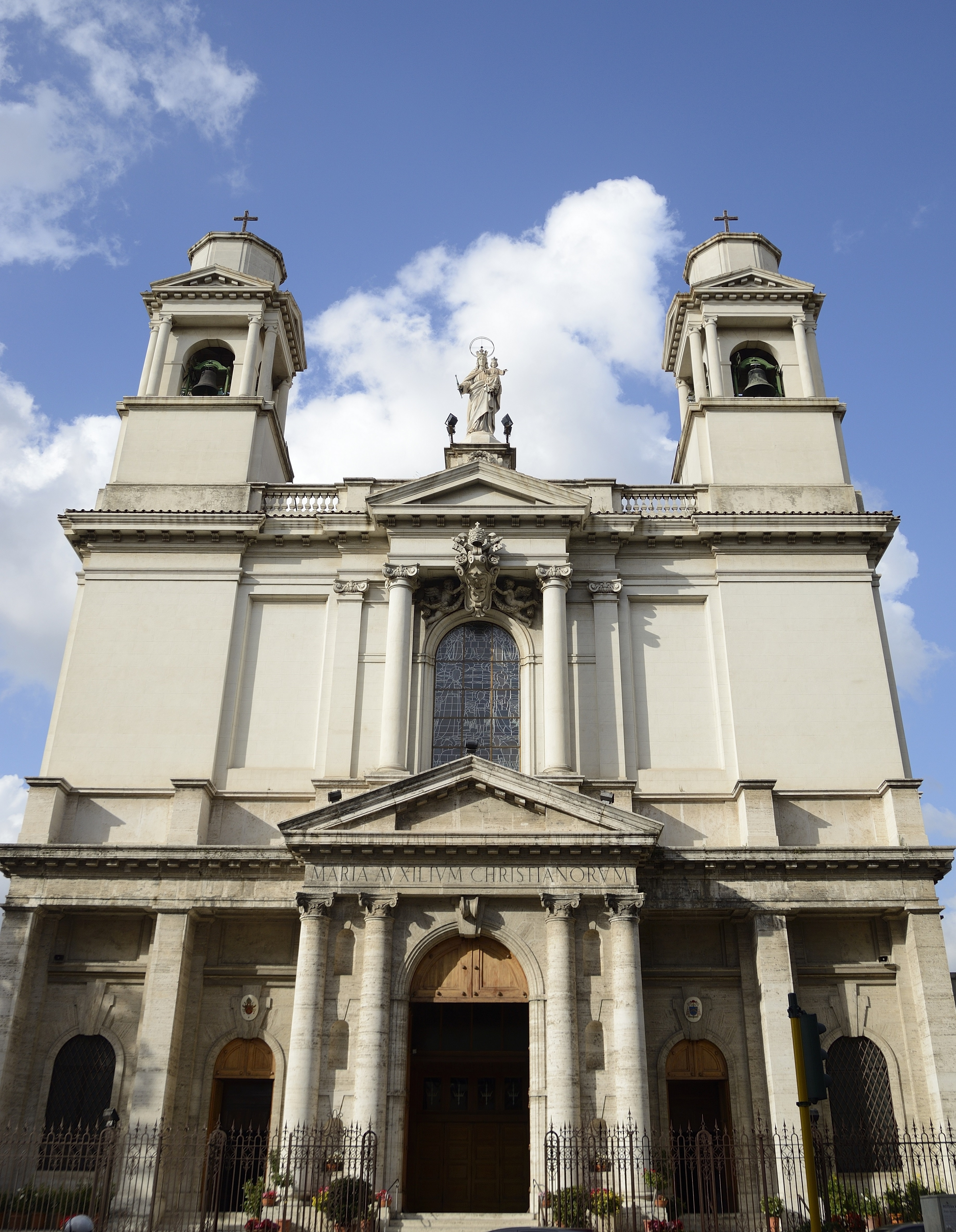
- The facade of the Minor Basilica
- Click on the map for a fullscreen view
- 41°52′28.19″N 12°31′48.96″E
- Location: Rome
- Country: Italy
- Denomination: Roman Catholic
- Tradition: Roman Rite
- Website: (in Italian) Official website

History
- Status: Parish, Titular church, minor basilica

Architecture
- Architect(s): Nicola Mosso; Giulio Vallotti
- Architectural type: Church
- Groundbreaking: 1931
- Completed: 1936

Specifications
- Length: 78 metres (256 ft)
- Width: 43 metres (141 ft)
- Materials: travertine

Administration
- District: Lazio
- Province: Rome

The Church of Saint Mary, the Help of Christians in Via Tuscolana (Latin: Sancta Mariae Auxiliatricis Christianorum in via Tusculana) is a Roman Catholic Marian shrine, titular church and Minor Basilica of Rome.

Pope Paul VI established the Titular church Sancta Mariæ Auxiliatricis in via Tusculana on 7 June 1967 via the Apostolic Constitution Ad Gubernacula Christianæ. He raised it to the status of Minor Basilica via the Pontifical Decree Dulcia Christi Verba on 1 April 1969.

== History ==
Pope Pius XI created this parish church on 25 March 1932, with the Apostolic Constitution Inter Pastoralis and entrusted to the Order of the Salesians of Don Bosco. The building was designed by architects Nicola Mosso and Giulio Vallotti between 1931 and 1936.

== Interior ==
The interior follows a plan of a combination design between a Latin cross and Greek cross, with three naves. The walls and ceiling are decorated with frescoes of Baroque inspiration, made by Roman artisan Giuseppe Melle between 1957 and 1965.

Within the shrine are significant images focused on the Blessed Virgin Mary as “Help of Christians”. A namesake statue is enshrined in the high altar of the basilica, which its crown and scepter was blessed by Pope Paul VI on 5 December 1965, in preparation for the closure of the Second Vatican Council.

== List of Cardinal Protectors ==
- Francesco Carpino as Pro illa Vice (1967–1978)
- Giuseppe Caprio (1979–1990)
- Pio Laghi (1991–2002)
- Tarcisio Bertone, SDB pro hac vice (2003–2008)
- Paolo Sardi (2010 - 2019)
- Ángel Fernández Artime (2023–Present)

== Notes ==
Preceded by San Lorenzo in Lucina	Landmarks of Rome; Santa Maria Ausiliatrice, Rome	Succeeded by San Marco Evangelista al Campidoglio, Rome
