= Pontifical Legate =

Personal representative of the Pope

A Pontifical Legate is a personal representative of the Pope.

Specifically, this title is used for:

- the formal title of the cardinal or bishop appointed to represent the Holy See in the administration of one or more Papal minor basilicas, notably:
  - the Pontifical Legation for the Basilicas of Saint Francis and Saint Mary of the Angels in Assisi (or until 2006, its precursor only for the Basilica of Saint Francis of Assisi)
- a generic synonym for any (usually diplomatic) papal legate

== See also ==
- Pontifical Delegate
- Legate (disambiguation)
