= Raymond Leo Burke =

American Catholic cardinal (born 1948)

His Eminence Raymond Leo Burke
- Patron Emeritus of the Sovereign Military Order of Malta
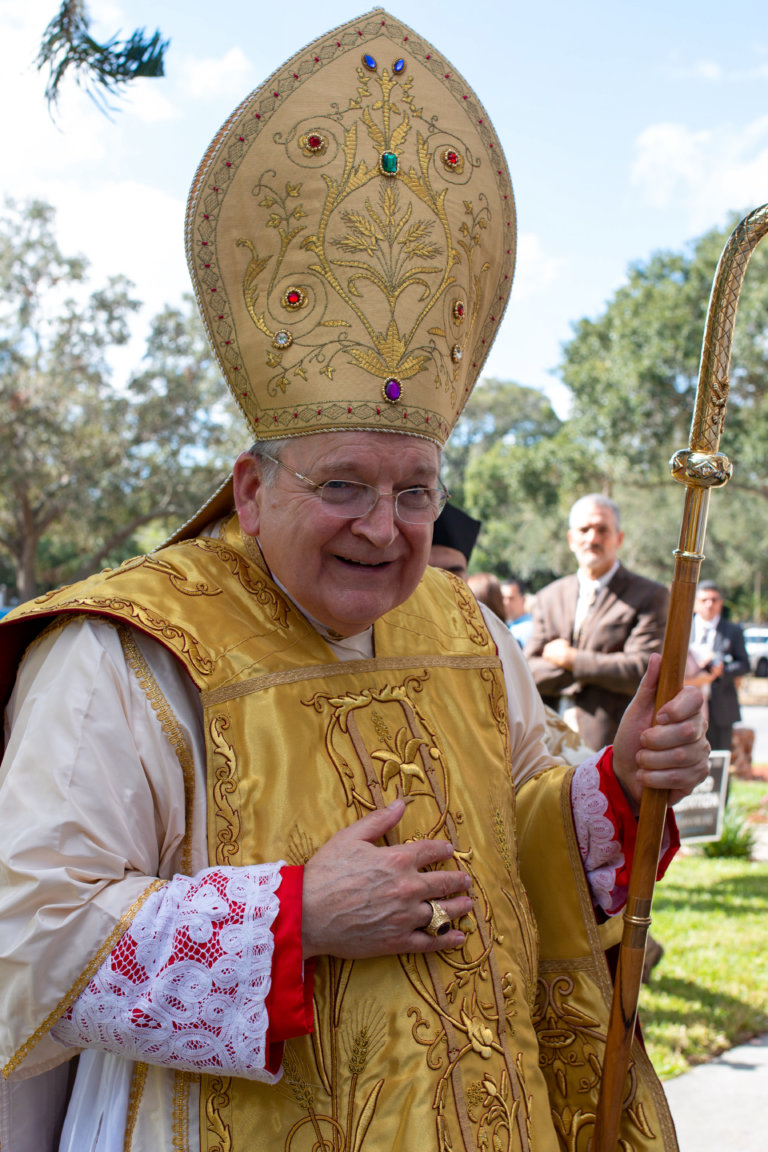
- Burke in 2022
- Church: Catholic Church
- Appointed: November 8, 2014
- Retired: June 19, 2023
- Predecessor: Paolo Sardi
- Successor: Gianfranco Ghirlanda
- Other post: Cardinal Priest of Sant'Agata de' Goti (2021‍–‍present)
- Previous posts: Cardinal Deacon of Sant'Agata de' Goti (2010‍–‍2021); Prefect of the Apostolic Signatura (2008‍–‍2014); Archbishop of St. Louis (2004‍–‍2008); Bishop of La Crosse (1995‍–‍2004)

Orders
- Ordination: June 29, 1975 by Pope Paul VI
- Consecration: January 6, 1995 by Pope John Paul II
- Created cardinal: November 20, 2010 by Pope Benedict XVI
- Rank: Cardinal-Deacon (2010‍–‍2021); Cardinal-Priest (2021‍–‍present)

Personal details
- Born: Raymond Leo Burke; June 30, 1948 (age 78) Richland Center, Wisconsin, U.S.
- Residence: Rome, Italy
- Education: Catholic University of America; Pontifical Gregorian University
- Motto: Secundum cor tuum (Latin for 'According to Your heart')
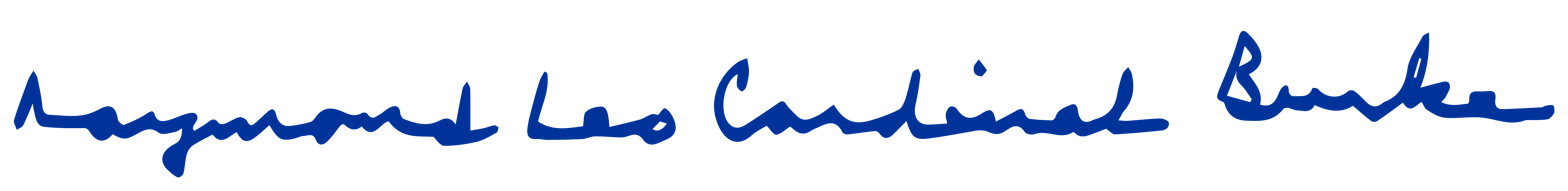
- Signature: Raymond Leo Burke's signature
- Styles
- Reference style: His Eminence
- Spoken style: Your Eminence
- Religious style: Cardinal
- Informal style: Cardinal

Ordination history
History
Priestly ordination
- Ordained by: Pope Paul VI
- Date: June 29, 1975
- Place: Rome
Episcopal consecration
- Principal consecrator: Pope John Paul II
- Co-consecrators: Giovanni Battista Re, Jorge María Mejía
- Date: January 6, 1995
- Place: Rome
Cardinalate
- Elevated by: Pope Benedict XVI
- Date: November 20, 2010
Episcopal succession
Bishops consecrated by Raymond Leo Burke as principal consecrator
- Robert Finn: 2004
- James Vann Johnston, Jr.: 2008

Raymond Leo Burke (born June 30, 1948) is an American prelate of the Catholic Church. He served as patron of the Sovereign Military Order of Malta from 2014 to 2023. He previously served as Archbishop of St. Louis from 2004 to 2008 and Bishop of La Crosse from 1995 to 2004. From 2008 to 2014, he was the prefect of the Supreme Tribunal of the Apostolic Signatura. He was made a cardinal in 2010.

A canon lawyer, Burke is a major voice of traditionalism among prelates of the Catholic Church. He established a reputation as a conservative leader while serving in La Crosse and St. Louis. Burke is a major proponent of the Tridentine Mass, having frequently offered it and conferred ordinations on traditionalist priests. He has criticized what he sees as deficiencies in the post-1969 Mass of Paul VI. He is frequently seen as a de facto leader of the church's conservative wing by some mainstream media outlets.

Burke publicly clashed with Pope Francis, vigorously opposing attempts by other bishops to relax attitudes towards LGBTQ people and Catholics who have divorced and remarried outside the Catholic Church. Burke opposes euthanasia, and has opined that Catholic politicians who support legalized abortion, including former President Joe Biden, should not receive the Eucharist. While Burke denied allegations of disloyalty to Pope Francis, a number of Burke's statements were interpreted as criticisms, once mentioning the possible need to "formally correct" the pope in relation to Amoris laetitia. This has led to a backlash from some Catholics towards Burke.

In September 2015, the Vatican announced that Burke had been reappointed to the Congregation for the Causes of Saints, from which he had been removed in December 2013, but not to his more influential positions on the Congregation for Bishops and the Apostolic Signatura. In 2016, he was not reappointed as a member of the Congregation for Divine Worship. In February 2017, Burke was again sidelined when Pope Francis appointed Archbishop Giovanni Angelo Becciu as his special delegate to the Sovereign Military Order of Malta, with exclusive responsibility for the duties which would normally be exercised by Burke as its patron. Albrecht von Boeselager, the order's grand chancellor, announced that this meant Burke was "de facto suspended" from the patronage. Pope Francis reappointed him as a rank-and-file member of the Apostolic Signatura in September 2017. In November 2023, Pope Francis reportedly evicted Burke from his subsidized Vatican apartment and removed his salary as a retired cardinal.

== Early life ==
Burke was born on June 30, 1948, in Richland Center, Wisconsin, the youngest of the six children of Thomas F. and Marie B. Burke. He is of Irish heritage with ancestors from counties Cork and Tipperary. Burke attended St. Mary's Parish School in Richland Center from 1954 to 1959. The family later moved to Stratford, Wisconsin. Having decided to become a priest, Burke entered Holy Cross Seminary in 1962 in La Crosse, Wisconsin.

After finishing at Holy Cross, Burke enrolled at the Catholic University of America in Washington, D.C., as a Basselin scholar in 1968. He received a Bachelor of Arts degree in 1970 and a Master of Arts degree in 1971, both in philosophy.

Burke then travelled to Rome in 1971 to study theology at the Pontifical Gregorian University in Rome. He was awarded a Bachelor of Sacred Theology degree and a Master of Arts degree. While in Rome, Burke resided at the Pontifical North American College; he was classmates there with ten future bishops and two future cardinals – Blase J. Cupich and James Harvey.

== Priestly ministry ==
Pope Paul VI ordained Burke to the priesthood for the Diocese of La Crosse on June 29, 1975, in Rome at St. Peter's Basilica.

After his ordination to the priesthood, Burke returned to La Crosse. The diocese assigned him as assistant rector of the Cathedral of St. Joseph the Workman in La Crosse. He also taught religion at Aquinas High School in La Crosse. Burke went back to Rome in 1980 to study canon law at the Gregorian University. It awarded him a Licentiate of Canon Law in 1982 and a Doctorate in Canon Law in 1984.

Back in La Crosse, Bishop John Joseph Paul named Burke as moderator of the curia and vice chancellor of the diocese. In 1989, Pope John Paul II named Burke the first American defender of the bond of the Supreme Tribunal of the Apostolic Signatura, the highest ecclesiastical court in the Catholic Church.

== Episcopal ministry ==
Coat of arms of Cardinal Burke during his tenure as Bishop of La Crosse from 1995 to 2004

=== Bishop of La Crosse ===
On December 10, 1994, John Paul II appointed Burke as bishop of La Crosse and consecrated him on January 6, 1995, at St. Peter's Basilica. Burke took possession of the see of La Crosse on February 22, 1995.

In 2000, Burke convened the fifth diocesan synod, which resulted in the publication of Synod V, acts: celebrated June 11–14, 2000 in 2003. In 2002, he was influential in founding the Canons Regular of the New Jerusalem, an order of Augustinian canons dedicated to the Tridentine Mass, the traditional form of the liturgy in the Latin Church.

Two anonymous priests in the Diocese of La Crosse said that Burke's leadership was divisive. People in his diocese had divided opinions of him. One such example was the construction of the $25 million Shrine of Our Lady of Guadalupe in La Crosse, with critics saying that the money used should have gone to the poor. Burke defended the expenditure on the shrine, describing it as a fruitful way to raise spiritual devotion. Another was the diocese's withdrawal from Church World Service's annual Crop Walk because some of the money raised was being used to purchase condoms in developing countries. Burke also welcomed numerous traditional orders to his diocese, including the Institute of Christ the King Sovereign Priest (ICKSP), whose priests offer exclusively the Tridentine Mass. The parish that the ICKSP established under Burke was its first apostolate in the United States. Two priests left the diocese as a result of his policies.

Burke closed a number of schools while raising teachers' salaries. His style was noted by some of his aides to be more formal than that of his predecessor, Bishop Paul, although his aides described him as amiable and approachable in private. During his tenure, the diocese continued to participate in charitable efforts while increasing its moral and political activism.

=== Archbishop of St. Louis ===
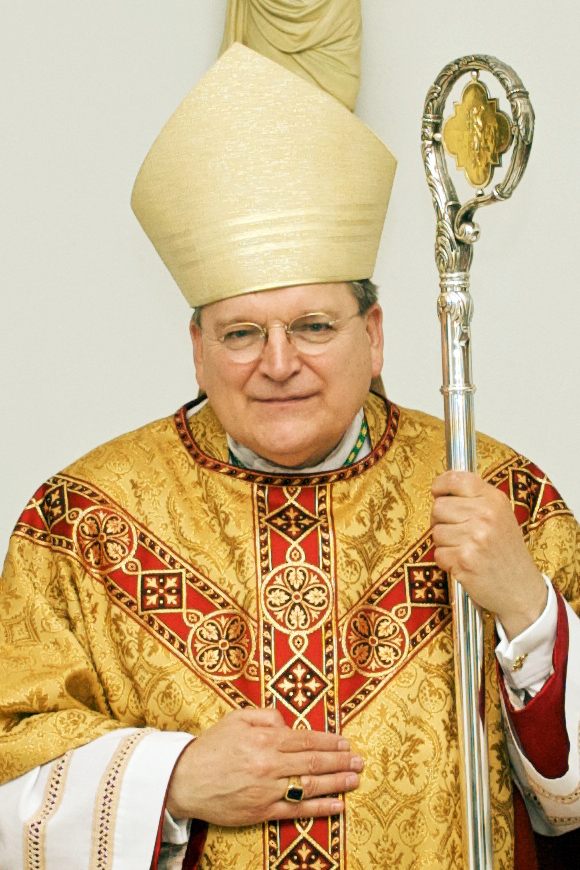
Burke as Archbishop of St Louis

On December 2, 2003, Burke was named archbishop of St. Louis, succeeding Cardinal Justin Francis Rigali, who had been appointed archbishop of Philadelphia. He was installed on January 26, 2004, and was presented with the pallium on June 29, 2004, by Pope John Paul II. In St. Louis, Burke emphasized the promotion of vocations to the priesthood. He also published a column in the archdiocesan weekly newspaper, the Saint Louis Review. In both La Crosse and St. Louis, Burke established oratories for those desiring to worship according to the traditional form. As he had done in La Crosse, he invited the Institute of Christ the King (ICKSP) into his diocese and ordained priests for the group both in the U.S. and abroad. His ordination of two ICKSP priests on June 15, 2007, in a Solemn Pontifical High Mass marked the first time in 40 years that the Tridentine rite of ordination had been used in the Cathedral Basilica of Saint Louis.

During his tenure, Burke escalated a long-running dispute over the attempted closing of a church in the diocese, St. Stanislaus Kostka Church, and the ownership of its significant assets. After the Reverend Marek Bozek led a Christmas Eve Mass in 2005 despite the archdiocese's previous attempted closure of the parish, Burke "declare[d] that the church was in 'schism'", a designation that led to the excommunication of Bozek and the church's lay board. In 2012, the St. Louis Circuit Court ruled against the diocese. It awarded it full ownership of the significant parish assets to St. Stanislaus Kostka, now an independent church, with the judge stating that "The archbishop may own the souls of wayward St. Stanislaus parishioners, but the St. Stanislaus Parish Corporation owns its own property".

== Positions in the Roman Curia ==
=== Appointments by Pope Benedict XVI ===
Between 2008 and 2011, Benedict XVI named Burke to the following positions in the Roman Curia:

- May 6, 2008 – member of the Pontifical Council for Legislative Texts, which interprets canon law, and of the Congregation for the Clergy, which regulates the formation and training of diocesan priests and deacons.
- October 7, 2008 – president of the Commission for Advocates, which admits canon lawyers to a registry of those who may practice in the Vatican's courts.
- October 17, 2009 – member of the Congregation for Bishops, which oversees the appointment of most Latin Church bishops outside mission territories;
- July 6, 2010 – member of the Congregation for Divine Worship and the Discipline of the Sacraments;
- July 24, 2010 – member of the Congregation for the Causes of Saints;
- January 29, 2011 – member of the Council of Cardinals and Bishops of the Section for Relations with States of the Secretariat of State.

=== College of Cardinals ===
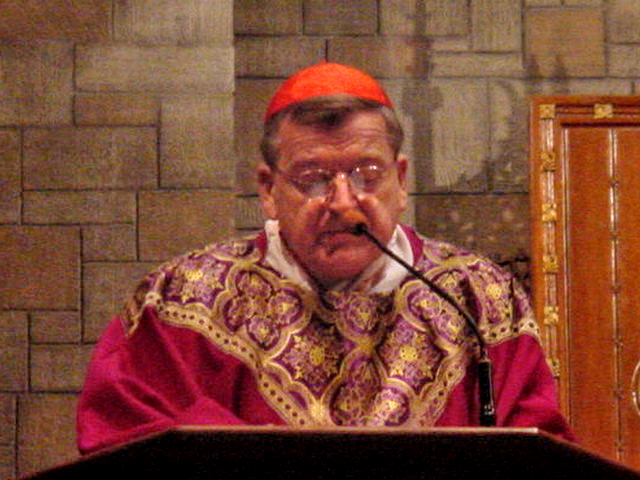
Burke at a Mass at St. Clement Eucharistic Shrine in Boston, 2010

On November 20, 2010, Benedict XVI made Burke Cardinal-Deacon of the Sant'Agata dei Goti Church in Rome. He became the fifth archbishop of St. Louis to become a cardinal. On February 5, 2011, Burke took canonical possession of Sant'Agata dei Goti.

In October 2012, Burke was appointed as president of the Commission for Controversies at the 13th Ordinary General Assembly of the Synod of Bishops in Rome. Burke was a cardinal elector who participated in the 2013 papal conclave that elected Pope Francis.

On December 16, 2013, Francis made extensive changes to the Congregation for Bishops, the influential Vatican department that oversees the selection and assignment of bishops; he did not reappoint Burke as a member. Some speculated this reflected the fact that Burke takes "a more aggressive line than the pope on the Western culture wars". According to Archbishop Carlo Maria Viganò, Burke's removal happened due to the influence of Cardinal Theodore McCarrick, but this claim has not been independently verified.

After ten years as cardinal deacon, Burke exercised his option to assume the rank of cardinal priest; Francis confirmed it on May 3, 2021. In November 2023, Francis reportedly evicted Burke from his subsidized apartment at the Vatican and terminated his salary as a retired cardinal. Burke was once again a cardinal elector in the 2025 papal conclave that elected Pope Leo XIV.

=== Apostolic Signatura ===
In July 2006, Benedict XVI appointed Burke a member of the Supreme Tribunal of the Apostolic Signatura, the highest court in the Catholic Church. In June 2008, Benedict XVI appointed Burke as prefect of the same body.

On November 4, 2014, in an interview with the Spanish Catholic weekly Vida Nueva, Burke complained that "There is a strong sense that the church is like a ship without a rudder." However, he also stated that he was not criticizing Francis. On November 8, four days later, Francis removed Burke as prefect. Many observers believed that Francis removed Burke as prefect due to his "ship without a rudder" comment. Francis in December 2014 denied it, saying that he had decided to remove Burke before the October 2014 Synod of Bishops in Rome as part of a departmental restructuring.

==== Patron of the Sovereign Military Order of Malta ====
In November 2014, Francis named Burke as patron of the Sovereign Military Order of Malta. This position was a largely ceremonial post that was usually given to a retired cardinal or as a secondary job to an active one. Francis claimed that he wanted a "smart American" to serve as patron of Malta.

In January 2017, it was revealed that Burke and Matthew Festing, grand master of Malta, had attempted to oust Albrecht Freiherr von Boeselager as grand chancellor of the order. The ostensible reason was that von Boeselager had approved the supplying of condoms by the order to people in Myanmar, contradicting Catholic teaching. On February 2, 2017, Francis appointed Archbishop Giovanni Angelo Becciu as his special delegate to Malta. Becciu was given the duties normally performed by the patron. On February 21, von Boeselager admitted that Burke was "de facto suspended" as patron.

On June 19, 2023, Francis replaced Burke as patron with Cardinal Gianfranco Ghirlanda. It was noted that Burke was removed when he was still 74, short of the customary retirement age of 75, and that his replacement was 80.

=== Other service in the Roman Curia ===
On September 26, 2015, Francis named Burke as a member of the Congregation for the Causes of Saints.

In November 2016, Francis removed Burke from the membership of the Congregation for Divine Worship. This was seen to be in response to the dubia (Latin for doubts) submitted by him, together with three other cardinals, to elements of Amoris laetitia which appear to them to be at odds with Catholic moral teaching, notably with regard to the treatment of divorced persons. Burke had indicated that in the absence of a response to the dubia a “formal correction” of Francis would probably follow.

Beginning in February 2017, Burke presided over a five-judge panel at the church trial of Archbishop Anthony Sablan Apuron of Agaña in Guam on charges of sexual abuse of minors. In March 2018, the court found Apuron guilty and ordered that he be removed from office. In September 2017, Francis reappointed Burke as a rank and file member of the Supreme Tribunal of the Apostolic Signatura, but he did not regain his earlier position as prefect.

== Other activity ==
Burke previously chaired the advisory board of the Institute for Human Dignity, a Catholic-inspired non-governmental organization based in Rome. Burke terminated his relationship with the institute in June 2019 amid its being identified increasingly publicly with the political program of Steve Bannon.

In March 2015, he became the leader of the Holy League on the 444th anniversary of its being called by Pope Pius V against the Ottoman Empire in 1571. The modern Holy League describes itself as a parish-based network of men united in devotion to the Blessed Sacrament.

== Views ==
=== Comments on Pope Francis ===
Burke is widely viewed as a leader of the conservative wing of the church, and de facto leader in the United States to those who opposed the reforms under Francis. Shortly after Francis did not reappoint him to the Congregation of Bishops, Burke said:

One gets the impression, or it's interpreted this way in the media, that he thinks we're talking too much about abortion, too much about the integrity of marriage as between one man and one woman. But we can never talk enough about that.

Burke has denied media perceptions that Francis planned to change the Catholic Church's teaching on moral issues. He said that people "hardened against the truth" would claim that Francis wanted to change church teachings that today's secularized culture rejects. He also said "their false praise of the Holy Father's approach mocks the fact that he is the Successor of Saint Peter", and that he consequently "rejects the acceptance and praise of the world". Francis spoke favorably of Burke in 2017, saying, "I do not see Cardinal Burke as an enemy." He also called Burke "an excellent lawyer."

In an interview with The Wanderer on January 10, 2019, Burke denounced Francis's September 2018 Holy See–China Agreement. He said that it was "in effect [...] a repudiation of generations of martyrs and confessors of the Faith in China". Burke also criticized the notion of "synodality", in which authority is removed from the pope and placed in the hands of bishops. "In listening to the Pope, one is given the impression that he is giving more and more authority to individual bishops and Conferences of Bishops. But this is not the Catholic Church", Burke said. He accused promoters of synodality of attempting to affect a "revolution" in the church, the end of which would result in Catholicism being practiced differently in various countries, to the overall detriment of the church.

On June 10, 2019, Burke, Cardinal Jānis Pujats, and Kazakh bishops Tomasz Peta, Jan Paul Lenga and Athanasius Schneider published a 40-point "Declaration of Truths" claiming to reaffirm traditional church teaching. The bishops wrote that such a declaration was necessary in a time of "almost universal doctrinal confusion and disorientation." Specific passages in the declaration implicitly related to several writings by Francis, and some of them were seen as criticism or even opposition. The declaration states that "the religion born of faith in Jesus Christ" is the "only religion positively willed by God," seemingly alluding to the Document on Human Fraternity signed by Francis on February 4, which stated that the "diversity of religions" is "willed by God." Following recent changes to the Catechism of the Catholic Church to oppose capital punishment, the declaration states that the church "did not err" in teaching that civil authorities may "lawfully exercise capital punishment" when it is "truly necessary" to preserve the "just order of societies".

In September 2019, Burke and Schneider published an eight-page letter denouncing what they alleged to be six theological errors in the working document for the Synod of Bishops for the Pan-Amazon region. They asked that Francis "confirm his brethren in the faith by an unambiguous rejection of the errors." Burke and Schneider criticized the document for its "implicit pantheism," support for married clergy and a greater role for women in the liturgy, and for what they considered to be excessive openness to pagan rituals and practices common among the Amazonian peoples. They asked that the laity and the clergy pray at least one decade of the rosary and fast weekly for the rejection of such ideas over a 40-day period, from September 17 to October 26.

=== Abortion and embryonic stem-cell research ===
During the 2004 presidential election, Burke stated that he would not give communion to John Kerry or other Catholic politicians who publicly support legalized abortion. "One of the problems I have is bishops who say to me, 'Well, this is unheard of in the church's practice.' Actually it goes back to St. Paul in the (First) Letter to the Corinthians, when he says: The person who eats and drinks the body and blood of Christ unworthily eats and drinks condemnation unto himself," he said. He also wrote a pastoral letter saying Catholics should not vote for politicians who support abortion or other "anti-life" practices. Burke later clarified his position, stating that one could vote for a pro-abortion politician and not commit a mortal sin, if one believed there was a more significant moral issue than abortion at hand, but he also stated that he could not think of any sort of issue that would qualify. In a September 2008 interview, Burke said that "the Democratic Party risks transforming itself definitively into a 'party of death', because of its choices on bioethical questions", especially elective abortion.

When Sheryl Crow, who advocates for embryonic stem-cell research, was scheduled to perform at a benefit concert for the Cardinal Glennon Children's Hospital in 2007, Burke stated that to have the hospital host Crow would give "the impression that the Church is somehow inconsistent in its teaching." He asked that her invitation be privately removed and resigned from the board on April 25, 2007, when Crow's performance was confirmed.

In 2008, Burke urged Saint Louis University to take disciplinary action against its head basketball coach, Rick Majerus, after Majerus publicly supported abortion and embryonic stem cell research at a campaign event for Democratic Senator and presidential candidate Hillary Clinton. Burke stated: "When you take a position in a Catholic university, you don't have to embrace everything the Catholic Church teaches. But you can't make statements which call into question the identity and mission of the Catholic Church." Saint Louis University supported Majerus's right to publicly expound on his own personal views when made at an event he did not attend as a university representative.

In March 2009, Burke called on American bishops to withhold the Eucharist from Catholic politicians who support legalized abortion. The bishops' failure to do so, Burke said, "is weakening the faith of everyone. It's giving the impression that it must be morally correct to support procured abortion." He also said that any president who promotes and implements "anti-life" legislation could be an "agent of death". Burke later said that he made his remarks not as Prefect of the Apostolic Signatura, head of the Vatican's highest court, but simply as an American bishop. Two months later in May, Burke stated, "Since President [Barack] Obama clearly announced, during the election campaign, his anti-life and anti-family agenda, a Catholic who knew his agenda regarding, for example, procured abortion, embryonic-stem-cell research, and same-sex marriage, could not have voted for him with a clear conscience." During the election, Obama had not officially called for same-sex marriage, but had advocated same-sex civil unions.

In February 2013 Burke commented on the Irish abortion debate, stating that, in accordance with canon law, priests should exclude politicians who support abortion from receiving the Eucharist. Burke has stated that not simply politicians but anyone who supports abortion cannot receive Holy Communion. "I can't imagine that any Catholic wouldn't know that abortion is a grievous sin, but if they don't, once they've been told, then they either have to cease to support abortion or accept the fact they are not a Catholic in good standing and therefore should not present themselves for Holy Communion," he said.

In 2017, Burke said that Donald Trump's victory in the 2016 United States presidential election was a win for anti-abortion causes.

In an August 2019 interview, Burke criticized people who consider themselves members of the church but disagree with its teaching on certain issues. "I've had non-Catholic leaders of government in this nation tell me that they were certain that the Catholic teaching on abortion and so-called same-sex marriage have changed because so many Catholics on Capitol Hill are regularly supporting this kind of legislation. And that's a scandal," he said. Singling out Joe Biden, he told such people not to attempt to receive Holy Communion. "It's not a punishment. It's actually a favor to these people to tell them don't approach, because if they approach, they commit sacrilege." Burke denounced Kamala Harris for her criticisms of Judge Brian Buescher and his affiliation with the Knights of Columbus, saying that people "need to look at that kind of statement for what it is and say this isn't a person who I want to be the leader of my nation."

=== Role of women in the church and priest shortage ===
In June 2008, Burke as the Archbishop of Saint Louis applied an interdict, which excludes a person from church ministries and the sacraments, to a Sister of Charity, Louise Lears, judging her guilty of three grave canonical offenses against the Catholic Church's faith and teachings. Lears, a pastoral worker and educator, had publicly stated her belief that all of the church's ministries, including the priesthood, should be open to women. Lears received the interdict after attending an ordination ceremony, which the church does not recognize, of a woman to the priesthood at a Jewish synagogue by the WomenPriests movement.

In January 2015, Burke gave an interview to an organization called the New Emangelization [sic] Project. The group was formed to confront what it calls a "man crisis" in the Catholic Church. In the interview, Burke is sympathetic to the group's concerns that men are being driven from the pews because of the "feminization" of the Catholic Church. Burke criticized what he saw as the excessive role of "radical feminism" in the church. He said that it has "assaulted the Church and society since the 1960s has left men very marginalized" and led the church to deemphasize issues important to men, such as chivalry and sacrifice. In addition to decrying "radical feminism", he specifically criticized the introduction of female altar servers as an unwelcome sign of the "feminization" of the church and a disincentive to boys to serve at the altar and start on the path to ordination. "The introduction of girl servers also led many boys to abandon altar service", Burke said. "Young boys don't want to do things with girls. It's just natural. The girls were also very good at altar service. So many boys drifted away over time." In another 2015 interview, Burke blamed pedophile priests on "radical feminism which has assaulted the Church and society since the 1960s".

Burke has said that it requires "certain manly discipline to serve as an altar boy in service at the side of a priest, and most priests have their first deep experiences of the liturgy as altar boys. If we are not training young men as altar boys, giving them an experience of serving God in the liturgy, we should not be surprised that vocations have fallen dramatically."

=== Homosexuality ===
Burke is a strong critic and opponent of moves to soften attitudes towards homosexuality and to permit greater acceptance of gay people within the church. In a 2013 interview, Burke said that same-sex marriage "is a work of deceit, a lie about the most fundamental aspect of our human nature, our human sexuality, which, after life itself, defines us. There is only one place these types of lies come from, namely Satan. It is a diabolical situation which is aimed at destroying individuals, families, and eventually our nation."

In an interview in October 2014, Burke referred to gay relationships as "profoundly disordered and harmful", stating that parents should not "expose [their] children to that." He suggested that parents should not allow their children to have contact with sexually active gay people and should discourage them from attending family gatherings such as celebrations at Christmas. He has described homosexuality as an "ailment" which is not genetic but largely depended on a person's environment. Shortly after he argued that Pope Francis had never said that positive elements could be found in homosexual acts, adding that it was "impossible to find positive elements in an evil act."

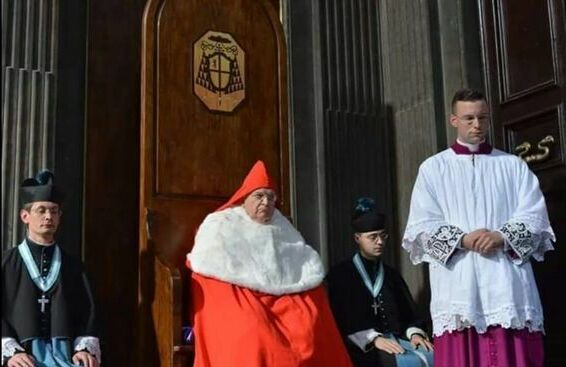
Burke in 2019

Speaking in Oxford after the May 2015 same-sex marriage referendum in Ireland, Burke said that he struggled to understand "any nation redefining marriage ... I mean, this is a defiance of God. It's just incredible. Pagans may have tolerated homosexual behaviours, they never dared to say this was marriage." Archbishop Eamon Martin of Armagh distanced himself from Burke's remarks, urging individuals "to try to be respectful and inoffensive in language" wherever possible.

In August 2017, Burke said that Cardinal Reinhard Marx's assertion that Germany's recent legalization of same-sex marriage should not be a major concern for the Catholic Church there showed how the church lacked "the clarity and the courage to announce the Gospel of Life and Divine Love to the radically secularized culture". He alluded to diabolical errors spreading from society to church leaders, raising concerns that the "end times" were nearing, and once again stating that homosexual acts were sinful. He insisted that the correct approach would distinguish between the love for the person and the hatred Catholics "must always have for sinful acts".

In 2019, Burke chastised some of his fellow bishops for their perceived failures in keeping church teaching. He believes there are "pressure groups" within the United States Conference of Catholic Bishops (USCCB) which have been attempting to soften the church's attitude on homosexuality, including trying to remove the description "intrinsically disordered" from the discussion of homosexual acts in the Catechism, a change which Burke said is "not possible". Burke went on, "There is definitely within the hierarchy of the United States an element which is not coherent with the Church on these issues." He then criticized prelates who "promote Fr. James Martin ... within their dioceses". He alleged that Martin "is not coherent with the Church's teaching on homosexuality" and said that such promotion is "an indication to us that there is a serious difficulty within the hierarchy that must be addressed".

In February 2019, Burke penned an open letter with Cardinal Walter Brandmuller addressed to Pope Francis calling for an end of "the plague of the homosexual agenda", which they blamed for the sexual abuse crisis engulfing the Catholic Church. They claimed the agenda was spread by "organized networks" protected by a "conspiracy of silence".

=== Divorce ===
Burke has opposed any hypothetical change of church doctrine that would permit civilly divorced Catholics who are validly married to remarry or receive the Eucharist once they have entered into a second civil marriage. In 2013, he co-authored a book with cardinals Gerhard Ludwig Müller and George Pell on the subject.

An interim document from the 2014 Synod of Bishops softened the Catholic Church's language on gay people, contraception and divorced and civilly remarried people. Burke said that the response showed that "a great number of the Synod Fathers found it objectionable." In an interview with The Catholic World Report, Burke said the document "lacks a solid foundation in the Sacred Scriptures and the Magisterium (the teaching authority of the Catholic Church) and gives the impression of inventing a totally new, what one member of the Synod called 'revolutionary', teaching on marriage and the family." Burke went on to say, in an interview with BuzzFeed News, that if "Pope Francis had selected certain cardinals to steer the meeting so as to advance his personal views on matters like divorce and the treatment of LGBT people", he would not be observing his mandate as the leader of the Catholic Church.

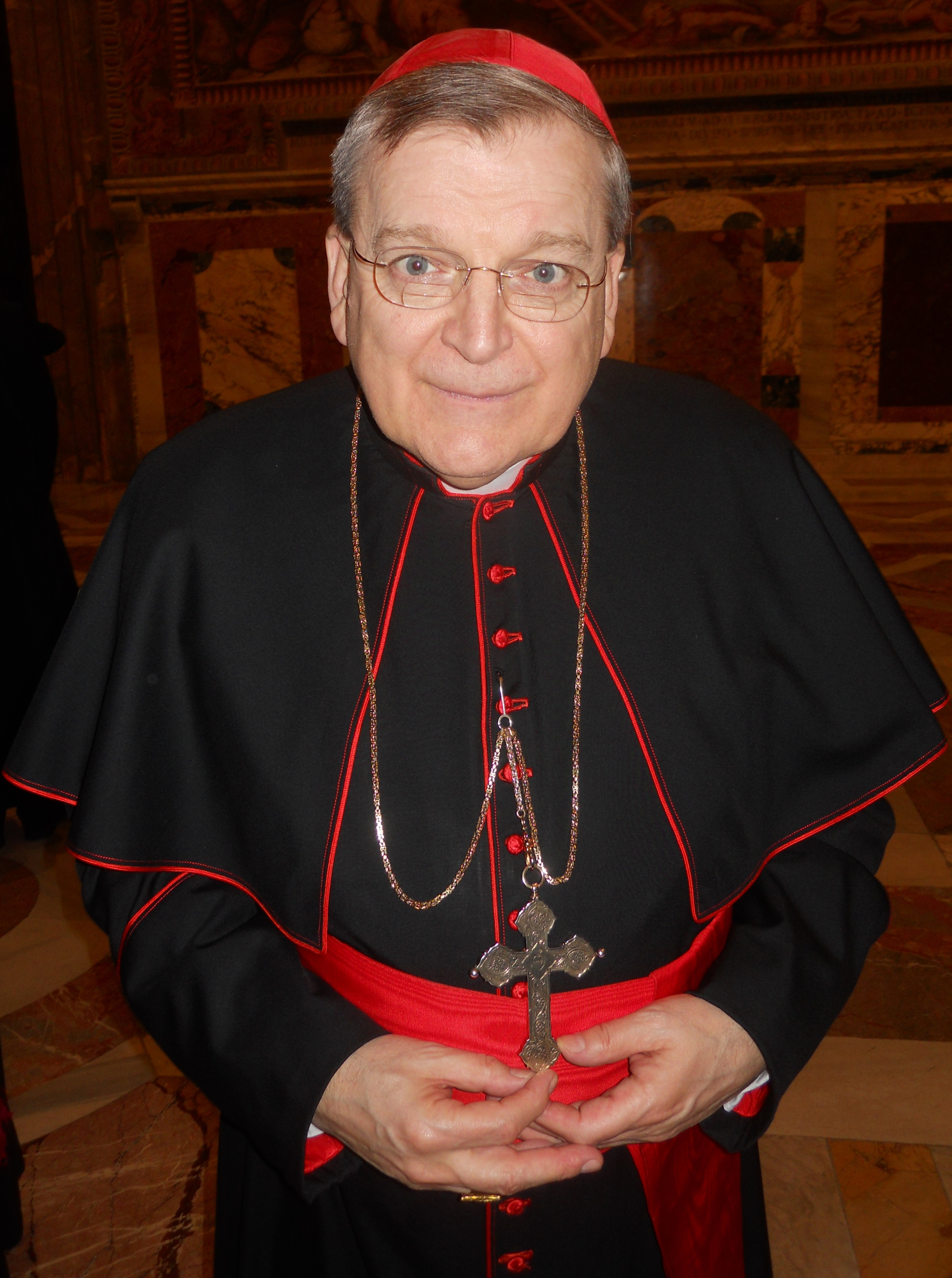
Burke in 2014

In an interview in the German daily Die Welt on April 24, 2015, concerning the Fourteenth Ordinary General Assembly of the Synod of Bishops, Burke renewed his criticism of German Cardinal Walter Kasper, whose "merciful" solution for remarried divorcees who wish to receive communion was discussed at the 2014 Extraordinary Synod. "We are bound by the Magisterium. But some Synod Fathers, above all Cardinal Kasper, want to change it. So I had to make myself very clear. Clashes at Synods, incidentally, are nothing unusual. Think of the early Councils, the Arian heresy, for instance, when Athanasius even became physically aggressive", Burke recalled. He also mentioned that Pope John Paul II had ruled out women's ordination “once and for all”.

Burke, along with three other cardinals, issued a set of dubia, or doubts, to Pope Francis, asking him to clarify various points of doctrine in his 2016 apostolic exhortation, Amoris laetitia and on general Christian life. The other cardinals were Italian Carlo Caffarra and Germans Brandmüller and Joachim Meisner. Since the 2014 synod, some bishops had begun allowing Catholics who had been divorced and remarried to receive Holy Communion, despite the fact that such persons are traditionally said to be committing adultery and living in mortal sin and therefore ineligible to participate according to official church law. A footnote in Amoris laetitia was seen as allowing that under some circumstances. Burke said that if divorced and remarried Catholics were permitted to receive Holy Communion, "then the Church's teaching on marriage is finished."

The four cardinals submitted the dubia in private, followed by a public letter ("Seeking Clarity: A Plea to Untie the Knots in Amoris Laetitia") in November 2016, asking Francis to clarify various points of doctrine. The first dubia asked about the reception of the sacraments by the divorced and remarried. The public letter asked about fundamental issues of the Christian life and referenced Pope John Paul II's encyclical Veritatis splendor. In April 2017, following no reply to their letter, the cardinals requested a meeting with Francis, but there was no response to this request.

On April 7, 2018, Burke, along with Brandmüller and Schneider, participated in a conference rejecting the outline proposed by German bishops to allow divorced and remarried Catholics to receive the Eucharist. Citing chapter 19 of the Gospel of Matthew, he disputed the notion that anyone, including the pope, had the authority to accept divorced and remarried Catholics as full members of the church. During the conference, Burke expressed the belief that a "public correction" of a pope in error can take place after a private one has been ignored or rejected. "As a matter of duty, the pope can be disobeyed," Burke said. He added that "the Roman pontiff can dispense with the law only for the purpose of preserving its purpose, and never for subverting it."

In an interview on September 6, Burke said that he shared fellow dubia signatory Caffarra's "profound sadness" that the dubia never received a response, and wondered whether such sadness contributed to his death. "The dubia must have a response sooner or later," Burke said. "It's a simple response: Yes or no. That's all. It's not complicated."

=== Palliative care and euthanasia ===
At a July 23, 2011, conference on end-of-life care sponsored by the St. Gianna Physician's Guild, Burke argued that suffering does not cause a person to have less meaning in his life, nor does it give the government the right to decide if that person should live or die, saying: "No matter how much a life is diminished, no matter what suffering the person is undergoing, that life demands the greatest respect and care. It's never right to snuff out a life because it's in some way under heavy burden."

=== SSPX reintegration ===
In 2012, during negotiations between the traditionalist Society of Saint Pius X (SSPX), which is in a canonically irregular status with the Holy See, Burke expressed optimism that the society's members would reconcile themselves with the Vatican. He referred to the society's members as people who "have the Catholic faith and the love of the sacred liturgy". The talks eventually failed. In July 2017, Burke said that SSPX was "in schism" and that it was "not legitimate to attend Mass or to receive the sacraments in a church" of theirs, and that faithful Catholics should avoid SSPX liturgies. He criticized Pope Francis's openness towards SSPX, stating that "There is no canonical explanation for it, and it is simply an anomaly", because while they were not excommunicated, they also were not in full communion with the Catholic Church.

=== Views on the Mass ===
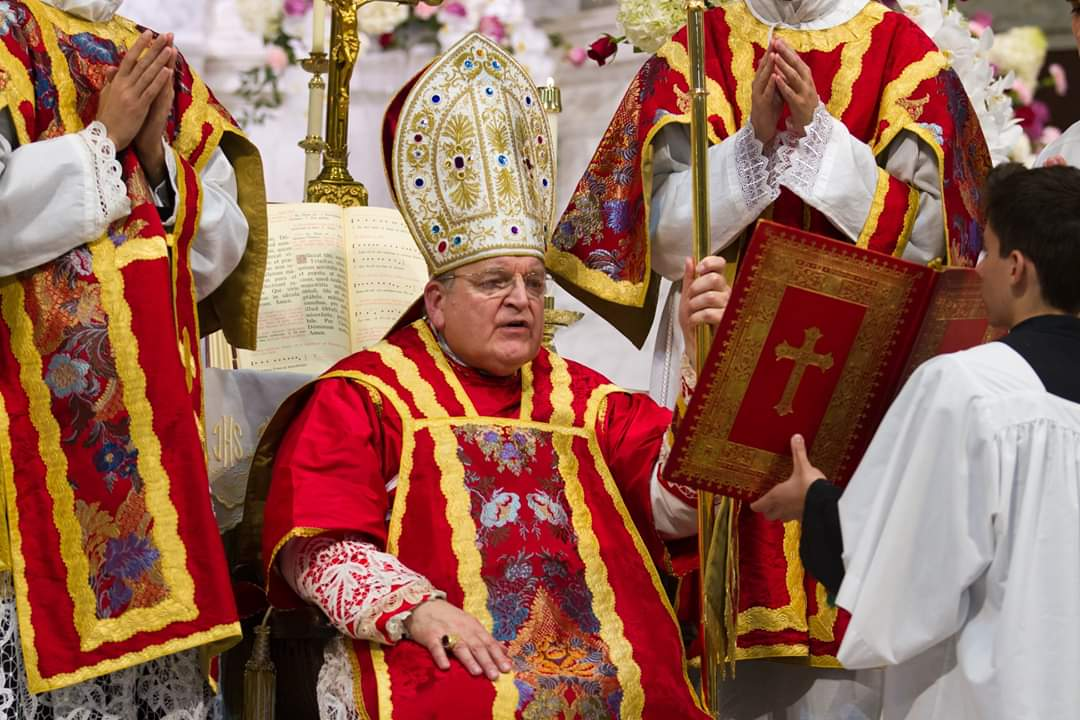
Burke offering Mass in the traditional form

In a July 2007 apostolic letter, Summorum Pontificum, Pope Benedict XVI authorized wider use of the Tridentine Mass, or Traditional Latin Mass, which had largely fallen out of use with the reforms of the Second Vatican Council and the introduction of the Mass of Paul VI, or Novus Ordo. The Novus Ordo contains more simplified rituals than the Tridentine Mass, and unlike the Tridentine Mass, is typically said in the vernacular and with the priest facing the congregation, while the Tridentine Mass is offered in Latin. Restoration of all or some parts of the traditional Mass have been supported by Burke as part of a "reform of the reform", modifying what he sees as deficiencies in the implementation of the newer Mass of Paul VI. In 2012, Burke said the following regarding the liturgical changes that took place after the council:

There was a stripping away, a changing of the form of the rite that in my judgment was too much. You can't take a living reality, the worship of God as God has desired that we worship him, and tamper with it without doing violence and without in some way damaging the faith life of the people.

In 2017, Burke referred to Summorum Pontificum as "the most splendid contribution of the pontificate of Pope Benedict XVI". Over the years, Burke has frequently offered the traditional form of the Mass, including regularly celebrating ordinations for the ICKSP and the Priestly Fraternity of Saint Peter, both traditionalist groups whose priests offer only the older form of the Mass.

In March 2011, Burke said that too many priests and bishops treat violations of liturgical norms as something that is unimportant, when they are actually "serious abuses" that damage the faith of Catholics. He criticized a perceived lack of reverence in the way the modern liturgy is sometimes conducted, stating "If we err by thinking we are the center of the liturgy, the Mass will lead to a loss of faith." At the same time, Burke is known to wear lavish regalia and "is one of the few cardinals who dons cappa magnas, the long trains of watered silk that can look like scarlet lava flowing down from his throne" as well as "velvet gloves and extravagant brocades".

In a 2015 interview, Burke reiterated his concern that man has become center of Mass, saying that "In many places the Mass became very priest‑centered, it was like the 'priest show.' This type of abuse leads to a loss of the sense of the sacred, taking the essential mystery out of the Mass. The reality of Christ Himself coming down on the altar to make present His sacrifice on Calvary gets lost." Burke blamed modernization of the liturgy after the Second Vatican Council for declining Mass attendance. "In some cases it actually became hard for people to bear because of illicit insertions, foreign agendas, and imposition of the personalities of priests and congregations into the liturgy to the point that people began to think that the Mass was some sort of social activity ... If one understands what the Mass truly is – Christ Himself coming down from Heaven to renew the sacrifice of Calvary – how could you possibly not be there on Sunday?" he asked.

Burke condemned Traditionis custodes, a July 2021 motu proprio issued by Pope Francis which effectively reversed Summorum Pontificum by placing limits on priests offering the traditional form of the Mass. He said that he could not understand the document's assertion that the Novus Ordo form represented the "unique expression" of the Roman Rite of the Mass, because the traditional form "is a living form of the Roman Rite and has never ceased to be so". While Francis described the Traditional Mass as something that had become a tool to promote schism in Christianity, Burke said that he had not seen such tendencies in practice. He alleged that the pope's document was "marked by harshness" towards those who attend Mass in the older form and criticized the fact that it took effect immediately, which in his view did not give adequate time for those affected to study its meaning. Burke stated that Pope Francis did not have the authority to eliminate the Traditional Mass.

In June 2025, Burke said that he had petitioned the recently elected Pope Leo XIV to remove the restrictions that Pope Francis had placed on the Traditional Mass. Following this petition, on August 23, Leo XIV received Burke in a private audience, reportedly to discuss the Latin Mass. In October, Burke celebrated a Latin Mass at St. Peter's Basilica.

=== Antinomianism ===
At the 2012 Synod of Bishops meeting in Rome, Burke criticized "antinomianism", the belief that grace exempts Christians from obedience to moral law. He described antinomianism as "among the most serious wounds of society today". He blamed it for the legalization of "intrinsically evil" actions such as abortion, embryonic stem-cell research, euthanasia, and same-sex marriage.

=== Islam and immigration ===
In a 2016 interview, Burke said there is "no question that Islam wants to govern the world" and that he feared "being forcibly under an Islamic government". In his subsequent book, Hope for the World: To Unite All Things in Christ, Burke says:

Islam is a religion that, according to its own interpretation, must also become the State. The Koran, and the authentic interpretations of it given by various experts in Koranic law, is destined to govern the world. ... In reality, there is no place for other religions, even though they may be tolerated as long as Islam has not succeeded in establishing its sovereignty over the nations and over the world.

Archbishop Diarmuid Martin of Dublin said that Burke's remarks were unhelpful at a time when Europe was still wavering in the aftermath of a series of terror attacks by Islamist terrorists.

Before the 2016 United States presidential election, Burke met with Steve Bannon, a close advisor to Donald Trump. The pair met several more times, and Burke was for years a strong ally of Bannon. In 2013, Burke was named president of the board of advisers to Bannon's Dignitatis Humanae Institute, an academy set up by Bannon to train right-wing Catholic activists. In 2019, however, Burke resigned from the board and cut ties with Bannon because of the latter's stated intent to make a film adaptation of Frederic Martel's work In the Closet of the Vatican. Burke said that "I disagree completely with a number of Mr. Bannon's statements regarding the doctrine and discipline of the Roman Catholic Church."

In February 2017, after Trump became president for his first term, Burke said that he did not "think the new president [would] be inspired by hatred in his treatment of the issue of immigration." In May 2017, Burke met with the right-wing Italian nationalist Matteo Salvini, head of Italy's Northern League and an opponent of Francis on immigration issues and dialogue with Muslims. In June 2018, Burke condemned the family separation policy of the Trump administration, saying, "A solution to the situation has to be found which avoids this practice of separating small children from their parents, that's clear."

In May 2019, Burke said that "to resist large-scale Muslim immigration in my judgment is to be responsible" and "a responsible exercise of one's patriotism"; he cited a book called No Go Zones: How Sharia Law is Coming to a Neighborhood Near You, by former Breitbart News reporter Raheem Kassam, in support of his contention that immigration of Muslims to Europe and the U.S. was harmful. Burke said that Muslim immigration was because Christians were "no longer ready to defend the moral law" and expressed fears of demographic shift because "Christians are not reproducing themselves."

=== Clergy sex abuse ===
In March 2010, in the wake of the sexual abuse scandal in Europe, Burke said that the Vatican needed to prepare a document that outlined a set of explicit guidelines rooted in canon law on sexual abuse cases. He said that would guide bishops and their local tribunals worldwide in determining how to report these cases to the Vatican. The goal was to speed up the process for delivering justice to victims. Changes would also be made to a policy that provided for high levels of secrecy in the process.

In August 2018, Burke described ongoing sex abuse scandals in the church as "an apostasy from the faith". He added that "principally, it starts with the idea that there can be legitimate sexual activity outside of marriage, which of course is false, completely false". Burke called for Catholics to pray and perform acts of reparation in the midst of the crisis. In January 2019, Burke said that "lay faithful who are well-prepared" in dealing with sexual abuse cases "should be called upon to investigate and help get to the bottom of" the church's clergy abuse problem, while also stating that any group of people investigating abuse cases must ultimately report and answer to the pope.

In June 2019, it was reported that Burke and other American bishops had received substantial cash gifts from West Virginia bishop Michael J. Bransfield. He had been forced to resign as bishop of the Diocese of Wheeling due to allegations of sexual misconduct and financial mismanagement. The gifts had been reimbursed by the diocese. Burke said that the gifts that he received from Bransfield were "generous", but "not lavish", and that he had donated the money to charity.

=== COVID-19 conspiracy theory, anti-vaccine ===
In December 2020, Burke criticized global responses related to the COVID-19 pandemic. Referring to it as "the mysterious Wuhan virus", he said that the virus is being used by "certain forces ... to advance their evil agenda" and to force people to become "subjects of the so-called 'Great Reset,' the 'new normal,' which is dictated to us by their manipulation of citizens and nations through ignorance and fear."

In August 2021, Burke raised objections to COVID-19 vaccination. He has denounced vaccine mandates and compared them to "state-mandated microchipping". Burke stated that the setting of vaccine mandates "violates the integrity of" citizens. In December 2020, referring to COVID-19 vaccine development, Burke said that the use of fetal tissue in vaccine development is "rightly abhorrent", saying it is "never morally justified to develop a vaccine through the use of the cell lines of aborted fetuses". The Vatican ruled in December 2020 that

"when ethically irreproachable Covid-19 vaccines are not available (e.g. in countries where vaccines without ethical problems are not made available to physicians and patients, or where their distribution is more difficult due to special storage and transport conditions, or when various types of vaccines are distributed in the same country but health authorities do not allow citizens to choose the vaccine with which to be inoculated) it is morally acceptable to receive Covid-19 vaccines that have used cell lines from aborted fetuses in their research and production process."

Burke has also criticized social distancing. On August 14, 2021, Burke announced he had tested positive for COVID-19; he was hospitalized and placed on a ventilator for several days. On August 28, Burke said that he had been transferred out of the intensive care unit and that his health condition was improving. On September 26, Burke announced that he been moved from the hospital and was making slow but steady progress in his rehabilitation from COVID-19 and he hoped to be able to resume normal duties in several weeks.

=== Synod on Synodality ===
On July 10, 2023, Burke was one of five cardinals–alongside Brandmüller, Robert Sarah, Juan Sandoval Íñiguez, and Joseph Zen–who signed a letter to Francis expressing concerns that the upcoming Synod on Synodality would undermine traditional church teaching, particularly on matters related to sexuality, the role of synodality in the church, the issue of whether teaching could change with time, and the ordaining of women as priests. The letter posed a series of questions which the Pope was asked to clarify. Francis responded one day later. The cardinals found his response unsatisfactory and concerning, and wrote him a second letter, dated August 21, in which they rephrased their questions so that they could be answered simply as "yes" or "no". Francis did not respond, and in October the cardinals made the letters public.

=== Reception ===
During the Francis papacy, Burke was frequently regarded as "the leader of the pope's conservative opposition." Burke's perceived status as an ultra-conservative and opponent of Pope Francis has led to criticism. Some bishops have refused to allow him to host conferences in their dioceses, and a number of priests have protested against him, having accused him of "spreading propaganda against the Pope". The National Catholic Reporter published a highly critical editorial about Burke in July 2019, castigating him as "the modern version of that religious leader that drew some of Jesus' harshest condemnations, those who placed undue burdens on others and pronounced themselves the undisputed bearers of truth." It rebuked him for allegedly wanting to "reconstitute the clericalism that is at the heart of the sex abuse cover-up scandal that continues to undermine the authority of the church," and for attempting "to replace the dynamism of Francis' model of accompaniment with a return to a statute-bound and static institution in service of itself." Catholic academic Mark Silk has publicly accused Burke of committing the heresy of "Americanism" condemned by Pope Leo XIII and of disobeying the Pope.

Nevertheless, Burke is well liked by many conservative and Traditionalist Catholics, who often appreciate his conservative doctrinal stances and support for the Traditional Latin Mass. The New York Times in 2023 described Burke as "a lion of the faith among conservative Catholics who see him as a defender of tradition and orthodoxy in a dangerously unmoored church." His conflicts with Pope Francis and the Vatican have been seen as symbolic of an ongoing large-scale conflict "between a more progressive Vatican and the American church".

== Honors ==
During his tenure in Saint Louis, Burke was awarded honorary doctorates in humane letters by two US Catholic universities, Ave Maria University in 2005 and Christendom College in 2007.

Archbishop Robert James Carlson of St. Louis created the Raymond Leo Cardinal Burke Chair in Canon Law at St. Louis's Kenrick-Glennon Seminary. In May 2011, the Franciscan University of Steubenville awarded Burke an honorary doctorate.

== Selected works ==
- Lack of discretion of judgment because of schizophrenia: doctrine and recent rotal jurisprudence, Doctoral Dissertation, (Rome: Pontificia Università Gregoriana, 1986). See also "Defectus discretionis iudicii propter schizophreniam: Doctrina et recens iurisprudentia," Periodica, 73 (1984): 555–570; and "Lack of Discretion of Judgment: Canonical Doctrine and Legislation," in The Jurist, 45 (1985): 171–209.
- "Canon 1095, 1° and 2°," in Incapacity for marriage: Jurisprudence and Interpretation, Acts of the III Gregorian Collguium, Robert M. Sable, coordinator and editor (Rome: Pontificia Università Gregoriana, 1987).
- "La procedura amministrativa per la dichiarazione di nullità del matrimonio," in I procedimenti speciali nel diritto canonico, Studi giuridici 27 (Vatican City: Libreria editrice Vaticana, 1992), 93–105.
- "Il processo di dispensa dal matrimonio rato e non consummato: la grazia pontificia e la sua natura," in I procedimenti speciali nel diritto canonico, Studi giuridici 27 (Vatican City: Libreria editrice Vaticana, 1992), 135–144.
- "The Application of Canon 1095 and sacramental-pastoral activity concerning marriage," in Ius in vita et in missione Ecclesiæ, Acta Symposii internationalis iuris canonici occurrente X anniversario promulgationis Codicis iuris canonici diebus 19–24 aprilis 1993 in Civitate Vaticana celebrati, Pontificia Concilium de legum textibus interpretandis (Vatican City: Libreria editrice Vaticana, 1994), 1095–1102.
- "The Distinction of Personnel in Hierarchically Related Tribunals," in Studia canonica, 28 (1994): 85–98.
- "Canon 1421: The Nullity of a Decision by a Single Lay Judge," [1994] in Arthur J. Espelage, OFM (ed.), CLSA Advisory Opinions 1994–2000 (Washington, DC: CLSA, 2002), 451–452.
- "Canons 1421–1422 and 1435–1436: The Exercise of the Office of Judge or Defender of the Bond by a Priest on Leave of Absence from Priestly Ministry," [1995, co-authored with Joseph R. Punderson] in Arthur J. Espelage, OFM (ed.), CLSA Advisory Opinions 1994–2000 (Washington, DC: CLSA, 2002), 453–454.
- "La "confessio iudicialis" e le dichiarizioni giudiziali delle parti," in I mezzi di prova nelle cause matrimoniali secondo la giurisprudenza rotale, Studi Giuridici XXXVIII (Vatican City: Libreria editrice Vaticana, 1995), 15–30.
- "Commentary on the July 12, 1993, Decree of the Apostolic Signatura relating to the qualifications of advocates," in Canadian Canon Law Society Newsletter, 21 (1996): 9–13; for Spanish translation see: "Abogados, uniones matrimoniales irregulares y causas de nulidad matrimonial: Texto y comentario de una Respuesta de Tribunal Supremo de la Signatura Apostolica," in REDC, 51 (1994): 639–645.
- "Canon Law at the Service of the New Evangelization," given on the occasion of receiving the Role of Law Award from the Canon Law Society of America, in Canon Law Society of America Proceedings, 62 (2000): 497–500; introductory remarks of gratitude, 495–496.
- "On Our Civic Responsibility for the Common Good," (Saint Louis: Archdiocese of Saint Louis, 2004).
- "Canon 915: The Discipline Regarding the Denial of Holy Communion to Those Obstinately Persevering in Manifest Grave Sin," in Periodica, 96 (2007): 3–58.
- Divine Love Made Flesh: The Holy Eucharist as the Sacrament of Charity. San Diego: Catholic Action. 2012. ISBN 978-0981631424.
- Hope for the World: To Unite All Things in Christ. San Francisco: Ignatius Press. 2016. ISBN 978-1621641162.

== See also ==
- Catholic Church in the United States
- Hierarchy of the Catholic Church
- List of Catholic bishops in the United States

Catholic Church titles
Preceded by John Joseph Paul	Bishop of La Crosse; 1995–2003	Succeeded by Jerome E. Listecki
Preceded by Justin Francis Rigali	Archbishop of St. Louis; 2003–2008	Succeeded by Robert James Carlson
Preceded by Agostino Vallini	Prefect of the Supreme Tribunal of the Apostolic Signatura; 2008–2014	Succeeded by Dominique Mamberti
Preceded by Tomáš Špidlík	— TITULAR — Cardinal Deacon of Sant'Agata de' Goti; 2010–2021	Succeeded by Himself (as cardinal priest)
Preceded by Himself (as cardinal deacon)	— TITULAR — Cardinal Priest of Sant'Agata de' Goti; 2021–present	Incumbent
Preceded by Paolo Sardi	Patron of the Sovereign Military Order of Malta; 2014–2023	Succeeded by Gianfranco Ghirlanda
