= Pontifical Legation for the Basilicas of Saint Francis and Saint Mary of the Angels in Assisi =

Office representing the Holy See

The Pontifical Legation for the Basilicas of Saint Francis and Saint Mary of the Angels in Assisi is the office, vested in a Pontifical Legate, that represents the Holy See in the administration of the Papal minor basilicas in Assisi, namely the Basilica of Saint Francis of Assisi and the Papal Basilica of Saint Mary of the Angels in Assisi.

== History ==
It was founded on 8 August 1969, as the Pontifical Legation for the Basilica of Saint Francis of Assisi. On 21 February 2006, when its responsibilities were changed to include the neighboring Papal Basilica of Saint Mary of the Angels in Assisi, it received its current name.

== Pontifical legates ==
Until 2025 all of the legates were Italian cardinals and former diplomats.

Pontifical Legation for the Basilica of Saint Francis of Assisi

- Cardinal Silvio Angelo Pio Oddi (13 June 1969 – 23 May 1996)
- Cardinal Carlo Furno (23 May 1996 – 5 November 1998)
- Cardinal Lorenzo Antonetti (5 November 1998 – 21 February 2006)

Pontifical Legation for the Basilicas of Saint Francis and Saint Mary of the Angels in Assisi

- Cardinal Attilio Nicora (21 February 2006 – 22 April 2017)
- Cardinal Agostino Vallini (4 November 2017 – 16 July 2025)
- Cardinal Ángel Fernández Artime (16 July 2025–present)
