= Paolo Sardi =

Italian cardinal (1934–2019)

His Eminence Paolo Sardi
- Patron of the Sovereign Military Order of Malta
- Appointed: 6 June 2009
- Term ended: 8 November 2014
- Predecessor: Pio Laghi
- Successor: Raymond Leo Burke
- Other post: Cardinal Deacon of Santa Maria Ausiliatrice in Via Tuscolana
- Previous posts: Titular Archbishop of Sutrium (1996–2010); Official of the Secretariat of State (1996–2004); Vice Camerlengo of the Apostolic Camera (2004–2010); Pro-Patron of the Order of Malta (2009–2010)

Orders
- Ordination: 29 June 1958 by Giuseppe Dell'Omo
- Consecration: 6 January 1997 by Pope John Paul II
- Created cardinal: 20 November 2010 by Pope Benedict XVI
- Rank: Cardinal deacon

Personal details
- Born: 1 September 1934 Ricaldone, Kingdom of Italy
- Died: 13 July 2019 (aged 84) Rome, Italy
- Denomination: Roman Catholic
- Motto: Esto vigilans ('Be watchful'; Revelation 3:2)
- Coat of arms

Styles of Paolo Sardi
- Reference style: His Eminence
- Spoken style: Your Eminence
- Religious style: (autofilled)
- Informal style: Cardinal

Paolo Sardi (1 September 1934 – 13 July 2019) was an Italian cardinal of the Catholic Church who spent his career in the Roman Curia. He was patron of the Sovereign Military Order of Malta from 2009 to 2014.

== Early life and priesthood ==
Sardi was born in Ricaldone, Province of Alessandria; his father was a farmer and his mother a schoolteacher. He studied at the local seminary of the Diocese of Acqui and then in Turin and Rome, where he earned a licentiate in theology from the Pontifical Gregorian University in 1958. Sardi was ordained a priest on 29 June 1958.

He graduated in canon law from the Gregorian in 1963 and completed a degree in jurisprudence at the Università Cattolica Milano in 1968. He taught moral theology in Turin until 1976, when he began his career in the Roman Curia, working in the Secretariat of State. In 1990, he was made manager of its Office of General Affairs. In 1992 he was appointed Vice Councillor for General Affairs.

== Curial career ==
On 10 December 1996 Sardi was given the title Apostolic Nuncio with special responsibilities and appointed Titular Archbishop of Sutrium by Pope John Paul II. Sardi coordinated the Vatican office that writes and edits the pope's texts and addresses. On 6 January 1997, Pope John Paul consecrated him an archbishop in Saint Peter's Basilica. Among his pastoral duties while at the Secretariat, he for many years said Mass daily at the tomb of Pope John XXIII in St. Peter's. Sardi would serve as the speechwriter for John Paul II as well.

On 23 October 2004, Pope John Paul II appointed him Vice Camerlengo (chamberlain) of the Holy Roman Church. In this position he was one of a small number of Vatican officials to visit Pope John Paul in his last days. He held that post until Santos Abril y Castelló was named to replace him on 22 January 2011. The role of vice camerlengo was in addition to his duties at the Secretariat; he complained to Pope Benedict about poor management there in 2009 and joked that, "I'm trying to see in these situations (which, to tell the truth, are numerous) the benevolent intervention of Providence, that wants to prepare me to leave the Secretariat without regrets".

He was appointed Pro-Patron of the Sovereign Military Order of Malta on 6 June 2009. On 30 November 2010, after he became a cardinal, his title changed from Pro-Patron to Patron of the Order of Malta. He held that position until 8 November 2014.

== Cardinal ==
On 20 November 2010, Pope Benedict XVI created him Cardinal-Deacon of Santa Maria Ausiliatrice in Via Tuscolana.

On 29 December 2010 he was appointed a member of the Congregation for Institutes of Consecrated Life and for Societies of Apostolic Life; the Congregation for the Causes of Saints; and the Pontifical Council for the Laity. To this Pope Benedict added membership in the Supreme Tribunal of the Apostolic Signatura on 31 May 2011.

He was one of the cardinal electors who participated in the 2013 papal conclave that elected Pope Francis. One analysis of Vatican politics following that conclave described Sardi as "one of [Cardinal Tarcisio] Bertone's political adversaries within the Curia". In 2009 Sardi had complained to Pope Benedict about Vatican mismanagement when Bertone as Secretary of State was the Curia's most powerful figure, writing to Benedict that "for some time in various parts of the church, including among people extremely faithful to it, critical voices have been raised about the lack of coordination and confusion which reigns at its center".

Sardi died in Rome's Gemelli University Hospital after a brief illness on 13 July 2019 at the age of 84. Bertone led his concelebrated funeral Mass in St. Peter's on 15 July; Pope Francis delivered the final commendation and blessing.

Catholic Church titles
Preceded by Pio Laghi	Pro-Patron or Patron of the Sovereign Military Hospitaller Order of Malta; 6 June 2009 – 8 November 2014	Succeeded by Raymond Leo Burke
