= Pio Laghi =

Italian cardinal

His Eminence Pio Laghi
- Patron of the Order of Malta
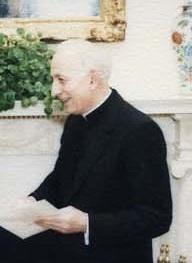
- Laghi in 1984.
- Church: Roman Catholic Church
- Appointed: 8 May 1993
- Term ended: 10 January 2009
- Predecessor: Sebastiano Baggio
- Successor: Paolo Sardi
- Other post: Cardinal-Priest of San Pietro in Vincoli (2002–09)
- Previous posts: Apostolic Delegate to Jerusalem and Palestine (1969–73); Titular Archbishop of Mauriana (1969–91); Apostolic Pro-Nuncio to Cyprus (1973–74); Apostolic Nuncio to Argentina (1974–80); Apostolic Delegate to the United States of America (1980–84); Permanent Observer to the Organization of American States (1980–90); Apostolic Pro-Nuncio to the United States of America (1984–90); Pro-Prefect of the Congregation for Catholic Education (1990–91); President of the Interdicasterial Commission for Candidates to the Sacred Order (1990–99); Cardinal-Deacon of Santa Maria Ausiliatrice in Via Tuscolana (1991–2002); Prefect of the Congregation for Catholic Education (1991–99); President of the Interdicasterial Commission for Equitable Distribution of Priests (1991–99); Cardinal Protodeacon (1999–2002)

Orders
- Ordination: 20 April 1946 by Giuseppe Battaglia
- Consecration: 22 June 1969 by Amleto Giovanni Cicognani
- Created cardinal: 28 June 1991 by Pope John Paul II
- Rank: Cardinal-deacon (1991–2002); Cardinal-priest (2002–09)

Personal details
- Born: Pio Laghi; 21 May 1922 Castiglione di Forlì, Kingdom of Italy
- Died: 10 January 2009 (aged 86) San Carlo di Nancy Hospital, Rome, Italy
- Buried: Faenza Cathedral
- Parents: Antonio Laghi; Laura Conti
- Education: Pontifical Major Roman Seminary; Pontifical Lateran University; Pontifical Ecclesiastical Academy
- Motto: In verbo Tuo
- Coat of arms

Pio Laghi (21 May 1922 – 10 January 2009) was an Italian cardinal of the Catholic Church. His service was primarily in the diplomatic service of the Holy See and the Roman Curia. He served as Apostolic nuncio to several countries and as the Prefect of the Congregation for Catholic Education. He was elevated to the cardinalate in 1991. Cardinal Laghi was Pope John Paul II's secret emissary to the White House and to several presidents of the United States. He had a particularly close relationship with George H. W. Bush, and George W. Bush.

His work as an apostolic nuncio in Argentina (1974–1980), during the years of dictatorship, has been and continues to be the subject of controversy.

== Biography ==
Laghi was born in Castiglione di Forlì, Romagna, Italy. He was ordained to the priesthood on 20 April 1946 by Bishop Giuseppe Battaglia. He obtained doctorates in theology (1947) and canon law (1950) from the Pontifical Lateran University in Rome. He entered the Roman Curia, in the Secretariat of State, in 1952, and then served as Secretary of the nunciature in Nicaragua until 1955. Laghi was raised to the rank of Domestic Prelate of His Holiness on 21 December 1965.

On 24 May 1969, he was appointed Apostolic Delegate to Jerusalem and Palestine, and Titular Archbishop of Mauriana. Laghi received his episcopal consecration on the following 22 June from Amleto Giovanni Cicognani, with Archbishop Agostino Casaroli and Bishop Giuseppe Battaglia (who had also ordained Laghi) serving as co-consecrators.

During five years in Jerusalem, he served as Pro-Nuncio to Cyprus (28 May 1973) and Apostolic Visitor for Greece. Laghi was a personal friend of Golda Meir.

Laghi was named Nuncio to Argentina on 27 April 1974. His six years in Argentina coincided with the worst excesses of the military dictatorship there in what is now known as the "dirty war". Many in Argentina believe that the church hierarchy supported the generals in their misrule, and that Laghi – who played tennis regularly with one of the leaders of the junta, Admiral Emilio Eduardo Massera – turned a blind eye to the murder and disappearances of thousands. "Perhaps I wasn't a hero", he later said of his time in Buenos Aires, "but I was no accomplice". The debate that his conduct generated was enough, however, to ruin any chance he ever had of becoming pope. In his book In the Closet of the Vatican: Power, Homosexuality and Hypocrisy, Frédéric Martel alleges that Laghi was blackmailed by the Argentinean junta into not opposing them because of his use of so-called "taxiboys".

Pope John Paul II transferred him as Apostolic Delegate (10 December 1980) and later (26 March 1984) Pro-Nuncio to the United States. In that role he helped place conservatives in key positions, such as Bernard Francis Law in Boston and John Joseph O'Connor in New York City.

On 6 April 1990, John Paul appointed Laghi Pro-Prefect of the Congregation for Catholic Education. He made him Cardinal-Deacon of Santa Maria Auxiliatrice in via Tuscolana in the consistory of 28 June 1991, despite the accusations by Argentine writers of links between him and the dictatorship and the "Dirty War" in Argentina. On 1 July 1991, he was promoted to full congregation Prefect.

On 26 December 1994, the American magazine Time published an article titled "Who Will Be First Among Us?" which prematurely speculated on who would be the next pope "as John Paul approaches the twilight of his papacy." Laghi was listed among eight cardinals who were considered leading candidates; the article identified Laghi as head of the Congregation for Catholic Education with conservative credentials. In 1997 the Dirty War scandal was widely exposed, and, though Laghi denied the charges, it was considered to have ended his chance for the papacy.

Styles of Pio Laghi
- Reference style: His Eminence
- Spoken style: Your Eminence
- Informal style: Cardinal
- See: Mauriana

He headed the Congregation for Catholic Education until his resignation on 15 November 1999. From 1999 to 2001, he was the Cardinal Protodeacon (the longest serving Cardinal Deacon), before exercising his right as a Cardinal Deacon of ten years' standing to become a Cardinal-Priest of San Pietro in Vincoli. On his 80th birthday, 21 May 2002, he became ineligible to vote in a papal conclave but continued to undertake special missions for his friend John Paul II.

In 2000, Laghi was awarded the F. Sadlier Dinger Award in recognition of his outstanding contributions to the ministry of religious education in America.

On 1 March 2003, Laghi, as special papal envoy to the United States, met with President George W. Bush and conveyed the Pope's request that the United States reconsider the decision to go to war against Iraq. Bush was photographed with Laghi and commented that he was "an old family friend". During the presidency of Bush's father, George H. W. Bush, Laghi, as Nuncio to the United States, was a frequent guest of Bush senior and his family.

Laghi died in Rome on 10 January 2009, from a blood disorder, aged 86.

Catholic Church titles
Preceded by Jean Jadot	Apostolic Delegate to the United States; 1980–1984	Succeeded by none
Preceded by none, new office	Apostolic Pro-Nuncio to the United States; 1984–1990	Succeeded by Agostino Cacciavillan
Preceded by William Baum	Prefect of the Congregation for Catholic Education; 1990–1999	Succeeded by Zenon Grocholewski
Preceded by Eduardo Martínez Somalo	Cardinal Protodeacon; 9 January 1999 – 26 February 2002	Succeeded by Luigi Poggi
