= List of titular churches =

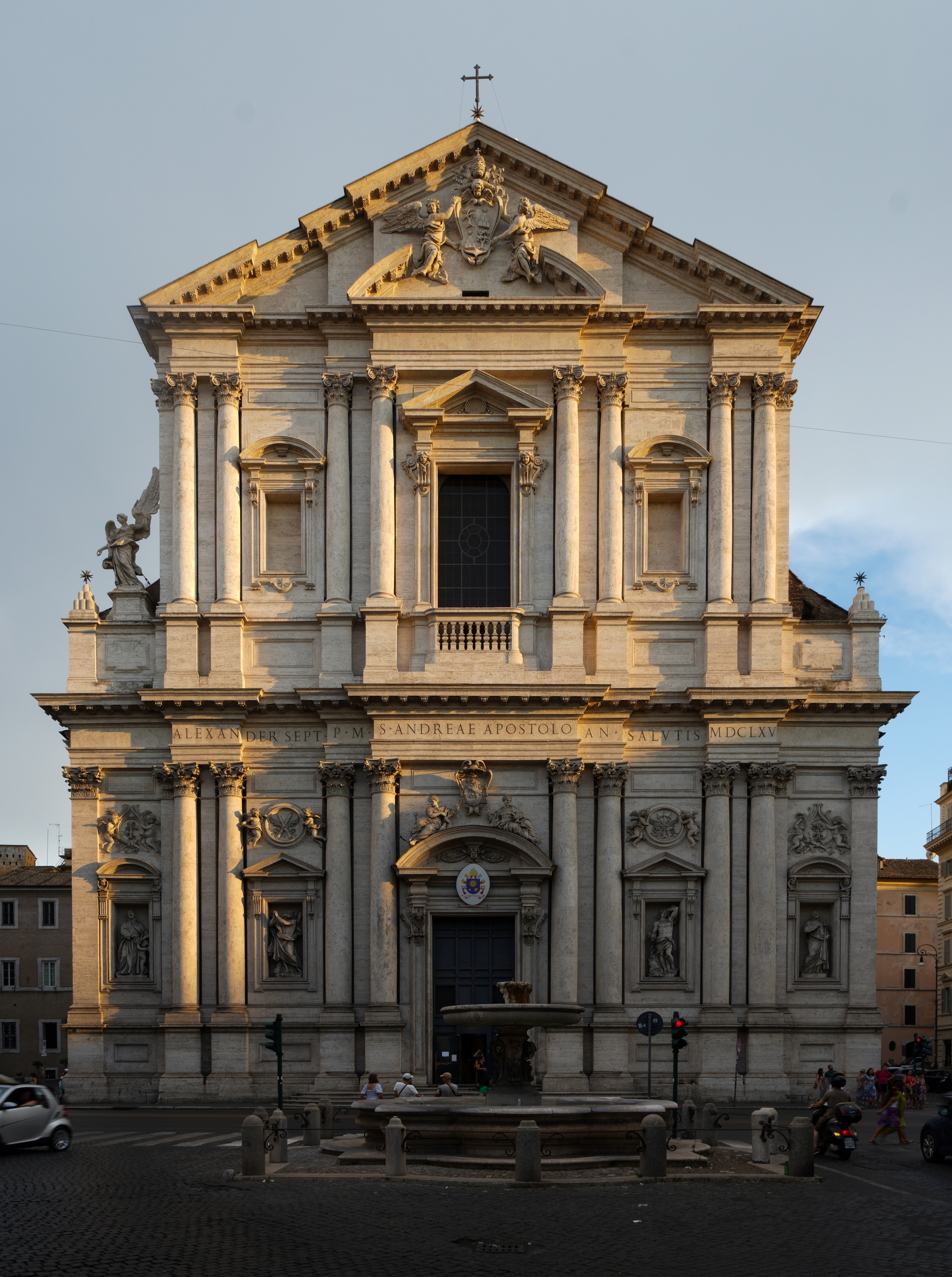
Sant'Andrea della Valle is the titular church of Cardinal Dieudonné Nzapalainga.

In the Catholic Church, a member of the clergy who is created a cardinal is assigned a titular church in Rome, Italy. These are Catholic churches in the city, within the jurisdiction of the Diocese of Rome, that serve as honorary designations signifying the relationship between cardinals and the pope, the bishop of Rome. According to the Code of Canon Law, a cardinal may assist his titular church through counsel or patronage, although "he has no power of governance over it, and he should not for any reason interfere in matters concerning the administration of its good, or its discipline, or the service of the church".

There are two ranks of titular churches: titles and deaconries. A title (Latin: titulus) is a titular church that is assigned to a cardinal priest, whereas a deaconry (Latin: diaconia) is normally assigned to a cardinal deacon. (Note: The body of all cardinals, collectively known as the College of Cardinals, is divided into three orders: cardinal bishops, cardinal priests and cardinal deacons, with precedence in that sequence.) A cardinal may request that he be transferred to another titular church in a consistory; in addition, when a cardinal deacon opts to become a cardinal priest (usually after ten years), he may request either that his deaconry be elevated pro hac vice ('for this occasion') to a title or that he be transferred from his deaconry to a vacant title. Occasionally, a titular church may be retained in commendam ('in trust') by a cardinal who has been transferred to another titular church or a suburbicarian diocese.

If a cardinal priest or a cardinal deacon is later made a cardinal bishop, he may be transferred from his deaconry or titular church and assigned the title of a suburbicarian diocese in the vicinity of Rome. (Note: On occasion, cardinal priests or cardinal deacons may be "co-opted" as cardinal bishops without being transferred from their titular churches or deaconries. This first occurred on 28 June 2018, with no change to the status of three titular churches and one deaconry when their assigned cardinals being made cardinal bishops. On 1 May 2020, one titular church was unchanged in similar circumstances.) The only cardinals who are assigned neither a titular church nor the title of a suburbicarian diocese are patriarchs of Eastern Catholic Churches: their respective patriarchates are considered to be their titles. (Note: As of 28 March 2022, two Eastern Catholic patriarchs are cardinals: Béchara Boutros Raï and Louis Raphaël I Sako.)

As of 25 October 2026, there are 255 extant titular churches, 184 of which are titles and 71 of which are deaconries, and 7 suburbicarian dioceses. Currently, 24 titular churches (15 titles and 9 deaconries) are vacant. The tables below also indicate the 58 titular churches (45 titles and 13 deaconries) that are designated as basilicas.

== Titles ==
As of 3 August 2026, there are 184 titles, fifteen of which are vacant.

† Vacant

Title	Cardinal	Since	References
Sant'Agnese fuori le mura (basilica) †	Vacant on the death of Camillo Ruini	16 June 2026	
Sant'Agostino (basilica)	Jean-Pierre Ricard	24 March 2006	
Sant'Alberto Magno	Virgilio do Carmo da Silva	27 August 2022	
Santi Ambrogio e Carlo (basilica) †	Vacant on the death of Dionigi Tettamanzi	5 August 2017	
Sant'Anastasia (basilica) †	Vacant on the death of Eugenio Dal Corso	20 October 2024	
Sant'Andrea al Quirinale	Odilo Pedro Scherer	24 November 2007	
Sant'Andrea della Valle (basilica)	Dieudonné Nzapalainga	19 November 2016	
Sant'Andrea delle Fratte (basilica)	Ennio Antonelli	21 October 2003	
Santi Andrea e Gregorio al Monte Celio	Francesco Montenegro	14 February 2015	
Sant'Angela Merici	Sigitas Tamkevičius	5 October 2019	
Sant'Antonio da Padova in Via Merulana (basilica)	Américo Aguiar	30 September 2023	
Sant'Antonio da Padova in Via Tuscolana	Jean Zerbo	28 June 2017	
Sant'Antonio in Campo Marzio	Manuel José Macário do Nascimento Clemente	14 February 2015	
Santi Aquila e Priscilla	Juan de la Caridad García Rodríguez	5 October 2019	
Sant'Atanasio †	Vacant on the death of Lucian Mureșan	25 September 2025	
Sant'Atanasio a Via Tiburtina	Gabriel Zubeir Wako	21 October 2003	
Santa Balbina (basilica) †	Vacant on the transfer of Péter Erdő	29 March 2023	
San Bartolomeo all'Isola (basilica)	Blase Joseph Cupich	19 November 2016	
Beata Maria Vergine Addolorata a piazza Buenos Aires †	Vacant on the death of Estanislao Esteban Karlic	8 August 2025	
Beata Vergine Maria del Monte Carmelo a Mostacciano	Anthony Olubunmi Okogie	21 October 2003	
Santa Bernadette Soubirous	Ángel Sixto Rossi	30 September 2023	
San Bernardo alle Terme	George Alencherry	18 February 2012	
San Bonaventura da Bagnoregio	Joseph Coutts	28 June 2018	
Santi Bonifacio ed Alessio (basilica)	Paulo Cezar Costa	27 August 2022	
San Callisto	Wim Eijk	18 February 2012	
San Camillo de Lellis (basilica)	Juan Luis Cipriani Thorne	21 February 2001	
Santa Cecilia (basilica)	Gualtiero Bassetti	22 February 2014	
Santa Chiara a Vigna Clara	Vinko Puljić	26 November 1994	
Santi Cirillo e Metodio	Grzegorz Ryś	30 September 2023	
San Clemente (basilica)	Arrigo Miglio	27 August 2022	
San Corbiniano	Reinhard Marx	20 November 2010	
San Crisogono (basilica)	Andrew Yeom Soo-jung	22 February 2014	
Santa Croce in Gerusalemme (basilica)	Juan José Omella	28 June 2017	
Santa Croce in Via Flaminia (basilica)	Sérgio da Rocha	19 November 2016	
Sacro Cuore di Gesù agonizzante a Vitinia	Jean-Paul Vesco	7 December 2024	
Sacro Cuore di Maria (basilica)	Julius Riyadi Darmaatmadja	26 November 1994	
Sacri Cuori di Gesù e Maria a Tor Fiorenza †	Vacant on the death of Edoardo Menichelli	20 October 2025	
Santi XII Apostoli (basilica)	Angelo Scola	21 October 2003	
Santa Dorotea	Jorge Enrique Jiménez Carvajal	27 August 2022	
Sant'Egidio	Matteo Zuppi	5 October 2019	
Sant'Emerenziana a Tor Fiorenza	Jean-Pierre Kutwa	22 February 2014	
Sant'Eusebio	Daniel DiNardo	24 November 2007	
Santi Fabiano e Venanzio a Villa Fiorelli	Carlos Aguiar Retes	19 November 2016	
Sacra Famiglia di Nazareth a Centocelle	Luis Cabrera Herrera	7 December 2024	
San Felice da Cantalice a Centocelle †	Vacant on the transfer of Luis Antonio Tagle	24 May 2025	
San Francesco d'Assisi a Ripa Grande	Norberto Rivera Carrera	21 February 1998	
San Francesco d'Assisi ad Acilia	Wilfrid Napier	21 February 2001	
San Frumenzio ai Prati Fiscali	Robert W. McElroy	27 August 2022	
San Gabriele Arcangelo all'Acqua Traversa	Fridolin Ambongo Besungu	5 October 2019	
San Gabriele dell'Addolorata †	Vacant on the death of Júlio Duarte Langa	3 August 2026	
San Gaetano	Diego Padrón	30 September 2023	
Santa Galla	Daniel Sturla	14 February 2015	
Santa Gemma Galgani	Stephen Ameyu Martin Mulla	30 September 2023	
San Gerardo Maiella	Rubén Salazar Gómez	24 November 2012	
Gesù Divin Lavoratore	Christoph Schönborn	21 February 1998	
Gesù Divin Maestro alla Pineta Sacchetti	Roberto Repole	7 December 2024	
San Giacomo in Augusta	Chibly Langlois	22 February 2014	
San Gioacchino ai Prati di Castello	Leopoldo Brenes	22 February 2014	
Santi Gioacchino ed Anna al Tuscolano	Toribio Ticona Porco	28 June 2018	
Santa Giovanna Antida Thouret	Dominique Mathieu	7 December 2024	
San Giovanni a Porta Latina	Adalberto Martínez Flores	27 August 2022	
San Giovanni Battista de' Rossi	John Ribat	19 November 2016	
San Giovanni Battista de La Salle	Stephen Chow	30 September 2023	
San Giovanni Battista dei Fiorentini (basilica)	Giuseppe Petrocchi	28 June 2018	
San Giovanni Crisostomo a Monte Sacro Alto	Jean-Claude Hollerich	5 October 2019	
Santi Giovanni e Paolo (basilica)	Jozef De Kesel	14 February 2015	
San Giovanni Evangelista a Spinaceto	Álvaro Leonel Ramazzini Imeri	5 October 2019	
Santi Giovanni Evangelista e Petronio	Baltazar Enrique Porras Cardozo	19 November 2016	
San Giovanni Leonardi	Tarcisio Isao Kikuchi	7 December 2024	
San Giovanni Maria Vianney	Rainer Woelki	18 February 2012	
San Girolamo a Corviale	Luis Héctor Villalba	14 February 2015	
San Girolamo dei Croati	Josip Bozanić	21 October 2003	
San Giuda Taddeo Apostolo	Giorgio Marengo	27 August 2022	
San Giuseppe all'Aurelio	Gérald Lacroix	22 February 2014	
San Giuseppe da Copertino	José Luis Lacunza Maestrojuán	14 February 2015	
San Giustino †	Vacant on the death of Phạm Minh Mẫn	22 March 2026	
Gran Madre di Dio	Angelo Bagnasco	24 November 2007	
San Gregorio VII	Baselios Cleemis	24 November 2012	
San Gregorio Barbarigo alle Tre Fontane	Désiré Tsarahazana	28 June 2018	
San Gregorio Magno alla Magliana Nuova	Jaime Spengler	7 December 2024	
Immacolata al Tiburtino	Raymundo Damasceno Assis	20 November 2010	
Immacolata Concezione di Maria a Grottarossa	Wilton Daniel Gregory	28 November 2020	
Sant'Ippolito	John Dew	14 February 2015	
Sant'Ireneo a Centocelle	Charles Maung Bo	14 February 2015	
San Leonardo da Porto Maurizio ad Acilia	Leonardo Ulrich Steiner	27 August 2022	
San Leone I	Cristóbal López Romero	5 October 2019	
San Liborio	Peter Turkson	21 October 2003	
San Lorenzo in Damaso (basilica)	Antonio María Rouco Varela	21 February 1998	
San Lorenzo in Lucina (basilica)	Malcolm Ranjith	20 November 2010	
San Lorenzo in Panisperna	Michael Michai Kitbunchu	2 February 1983	
San Luca a Via Prenestina	Luis José Rueda Aparicio	30 September 2023	
Santa Lucia a Piazza d'Armi	Théodore-Adrien Sarr	24 November 2007	
San Luigi dei Francesi †	Vacant on the death of André Vingt-Trois	18 July 2025	
San Luigi Maria Grignion de Montfort	Felipe Arizmendi Esquivel	28 November 2020	
Santi Marcellino e Pietro †	Vacant on the death of Dominik Duka	4 November 2025	
San Marcello	Giuseppe Betori	18 February 2012	
San Marco (basilica)	Angelo De Donatis	28 June 2018	
San Marco in Agro Laurentino	Domenico Battaglia	7 December 2024	
Santa Maria Addolorata	Kriengsak Kovitvanit	14 February 2015	
Santa Maria ai Monti	Jean-Marc Aveline	27 August 2022	
Santa Maria Assunta e San Giuseppe a Primavalle	Baldassare Reina	7 December 2024	
Santa Maria Causa Nostrae Laetitiae	Sebastian Francis	30 September 2023	
Santa Maria Consolatrice al Tiburtino	Philippe Ouédraogo	22 February 2014	
Santa Maria degli Angeli (basilica)	Anders Arborelius	28 June 2017	
Santa Maria del Buon Consiglio	Augusto Paolo Lojudice	28 November 2020	
Santa Maria delle Grazie a Casal Boccone	Carlos Castillo Mattasoglio	7 December 2024	
Santa Maria del Popolo (basilica)	Stanisław Dziwisz	24 March 2006	
Santa Maria della Pace	Francisco Javier Errázuriz Ossa	21 February 2001	
Santa Maria della Presentazione	Francisco Robles Ortega	24 November 2007	
Santa Maria della Salute a Primavalle	Frank Leo	7 December 2024	
Santa Maria della Speranza	Óscar Rodríguez Maradiaga	21 February 2001	
Santa Maria della Vittoria	Seán Patrick O'Malley	24 March 2006	
Santa Maria delle Grazie a Via Trionfale	Joseph W. Tobin	19 November 2016	
Santa Maria Domenica Mazzarello	Stephen Brislin	30 September 2023	
Santa Maria Immacolata di Lourdes a Boccea	François-Xavier Bustillo	30 September 2023	
Santa Maria in Ara Coeli (basilica)	Salvatore De Giorgi	21 February 1998	
Santa Maria in Monserrato degli Spagnoli	José Cobo Cano	30 September 2023	
Santa Maria in Montesanto (basilica)	Protase Rugambwa	30 September 2023	
Santa Maria in Traspontina	Marc Ouellet	21 October 2003 (Note: Of suburbicarian rank pro hac vice since 28 June 2018)	
Santa Maria in Trastevere (basilica)	Carlos Osoro Sierra	19 November 2016	
Santa Maria in Vallicella	Ricardo Blázquez Pérez	14 February 2015	
Santa Maria in Via	Filipe Neri Ferrão	27 August 2022	
Santa Maria Madre del Redentore a Tor Bella Monaca	Joseph Zen Ze-kiun	24 March 2006	
Santa Maria Madre della Provvidenza a Monte Verde	Orani João Tempesta	22 February 2014	
Santa Maria Maddalena in Campo Marzio	Vicente Bokalic Iglic	7 December 2024	
Santa Maria Nuova (basilica)	Péter Erdő	29 March 2023	
Santa Maria Regina Mundi a Torre Spaccata	Orlando Beltran Quevedo	22 February 2014	
Santa Maria Regina Pacis a Monte Verde	Oscar Cantoni	27 August 2022	
Santa Maria Regina Pacis in Ostia mare	William Goh	27 August 2022	
Santa Maria Stella Maris	Ladislav Nemet	7 December 2024	
Santa Maria sopra Minerva (basilica)	António Marto	28 June 2018	
Santi Mario e Compagni Martiri	Ignace Bessi Dogbo	7 December 2024	
Santi Martiri dell'Uganda a Poggio Ameno	Peter Ebere Okpaleke	27 August 2022	
San Mauro Abate	Fernando Chomalí Garib	7 December 2024	
Natività di Nostro Signore Gesù Cristo a Via Gallia	Audrys Bačkis	21 February 2001	
Santi Nereo ed Achilleo	Celestino Aós Braco	28 November 2020	
Santissimo Nome di Maria in Via Latina	Gaudencio Rosales	24 March 2006	
Nostra Signora de La Salette †	Vacant on the death of Polycarp Pengo	19 February 2026	
Nostra Signora del Santissimo Sacramento e Santi Martiri Canadesi	Patrick D'Rozario	19 November 2016	
Nostra Signora di Guadalupe a Monte Mario	Timothy M. Dolan	18 February 2012	
Nostra Signora di Guadalupe e San Filippo Martire (basilica)	Juan Sandoval Íñiguez	26 November 1994	
Sant'Onofrio	Pierbattista Pizzaballa	30 September 2023	
San Pancrazio (basilica)	Antonio Cañizares Llovera	24 March 2006	
Santa Paola Romana	Soane Patita Paini Mafi	14 February 2015	
San Paolo della Croce a Corviale	Oswald Gracias	24 November 2007	
San Patrizio	Thomas Collins	18 February 2012	
Santi Pietro e Paolo a Via Ostiense (basilica)	Pedro Barreto	28 June 2018	
San Pietro in Montorio	James Stafford	1 March 2008 (Note: Created a cardinal on 21 February 1998; transferred from the deaconry of Gesù Buon Pastore alla Montagnola)	
San Pietro in Vincoli (basilica)	Donald Wuerl	20 November 2010	
San Pio X alla Balduina	Nicolás de Jesús López Rodríguez	28 June 1991	
San Policarpo	Alberto Suárez Inda	14 February 2015	
Santa Prassede (basilica)	Paul Poupard	29 January 1996 (Note: Created a cardinal on 25 May 1985; transferred from the deaconry of Sant'Eugenio)	
Preziosissimo Sangue di Nostro Signore Gesù Cristo	John Njue	24 November 2007	
Santa Prisca	Justin Rigali	21 October 2003	
Santi Protomartiri a Via Aurelia Antica	Anthony Poola	27 August 2022	
Santa Pudenziana (basilica)	Thomas Aquino Manyo Maeda	28 June 2018	
Santi Quattro Coronati (basilica)	Roger Mahony	28 June 1991	
Santi Quirico e Giulitta	Seán Brady	24 November 2007	
Santissimo Redentore a Valmelaina	Ricardo Ezzati Andrello	22 February 2014	
Santissimo Redentore e Sant'Alfonso in Via Merulana	Vincent Nichols	22 February 2014	
Regina Apostolorum (basilica)	John Tong Hon	18 February 2012	
San Roberto Bellarmino	Mario Aurelio Poli	22 February 2014	
San Romano Martire	Berhaneyesus Demerew Souraphiel	14 February 2015	
Santa Sabina (basilica) †	Vacant on the death of Jozef Tomko	8 August 2022	
Santissimo Sacramento a Tor de' Schiavi	Gregorio Rosa Chávez	28 June 2017	
San Saturnino	John Onaiyekan	24 November 2012	
San Sebastiano alle Catacombe	Lluís Martínez i Sistach	24 November 2007	
Santi Silvestro e Martino ai Monti (basilica)	Kazimierz Nycz	20 November 2010	
San Silvestro in Capite	Louis-Marie Ling Mangkhanekhoun	28 June 2017	
Santa Silvia	Jānis Pujats	21 February 2001 (Note: Originally created a cardinal in pectore on 21 February 1998)	
Santi Simone e Giuda Taddeo a Torre Angela	Pietro Parolin	22 February 2014	
San Sisto (basilica)	Antoine Kambanda	28 November 2020	
Santa Sofia a Via Boccea (basilica)	Mykola Bychok	7 December 2024	
Spirito Santo alla Ferratella	Ignatius Suharyo Hardjoatmodjo	5 October 2019	
Santo Stefano al Monte Celio (basilica)	Friedrich Wetter	25 May 1985	
Santa Susanna †	Vacant on the death of Bernard Francis Law	20 December 2017	
Santa Teresa al Corso d'Italia (basilica)	Maurice Piat	19 November 2016	
San Timoteo	Arlindo Gomes Furtado	14 February 2015	
San Tommaso Apostolo	Pierre Nguyễn Văn Nhơn	14 February 2015	
Trasfigurazione di Nostro Signore Gesù Cristo	Pablo Virgilio David	7 December 2024	
Santissima Trinità al Monte Pincio	Philippe Barbarin	21 October 2003	
Sant'Ugo	Emmanuel Wamala	26 November 1994	
San Vigilio	Jose Advincula	28 November 2020	
Santi Vitale, Valeria, Gervasio e Protasio (basilica)	Adam Maida	26 November 1994	

== Deaconries ==
As of 25 October 2026, there are 71 deaconries, nine of which are vacant.

† Vacant

Deaconry	Cardinal	Since	References
Sant'Agata de' Goti, title pro hac vice	Raymond Leo Burke	20 November 2010 (Note: Elevated pro hac vice to a title on 3 May 2021)	
Sant'Agnese in Agone, title pro hac vice	Gerhard Ludwig Müller	22 February 2014 (Note: Elevated pro hac vice to a title on 1 July 2024)	
Sant'Ambrogio della Massima	Claudio Gugerotti	30 September 2023	
Santi Angeli Custodi a Città Giardino	Angelo Acerbi	7 December 2024	
Sant'Angelo in Pescheria †	Vacant on the death of Luis Pascual Dri	30 June 2025	
Annunciazione della Beata Vergine Maria a Via Ardeatina, title pro hac vice	Domenico Calcagno	18 February 2012 (Note: Elevated pro hac vice to a title on 4 March 2022)	
Sant'Anselmo all'Aventino, title pro hac vice	Lorenzo Baldisseri	22 February 2014	
Sant'Antonio di Padova a Circonvallazione Appia	George Koovakad	7 December 2024	
Sant'Apollinare alle Terme Neroniane-Alessandrine (basilica)	Raniero Cantalamessa	28 November 2020	
San Benedetto fuori Porta San Paolo	Christophe Pierre	30 September 2023	
Santi Biagio e Carlo ai Catinari	Leonardo Sandri	24 November 2007 (Note: Elevated pro hac vice to a title on 19 May 2018)	
San Cesareo in Palatio, title pro hac vice	Antonio Maria Vegliò	18 February 2012	
Santi Cosma e Damiano (basilica)	Mario Grech	28 November 2020	
Sacro Cuore di Cristo Re (basilica), title pro hac vice	Stanisław Ryłko	24 November 2007 (Note: Elevated pro hac vice to a title on 19 May 2018)	
Sacro Cuore di Gesù a Castro Pretorio (basilica), title pro hac vice	Giuseppe Versaldi	18 February 2012	
Dio Padre misericordioso, title pro hac vice	Crescenzio Sepe	21 February 2001 (Note: Elevated pro hac vice to a title on 20 May 2006)	
San Domenico di Guzmán, title pro hac vice	Manuel Monteiro de Castro	18 February 2012	
Santi Domenico e Sisto	José Tolentino Calaça de Mendonça	5 October 2019	
Sant'Elena fuori Porta Prenestina, title pro hac vice	João Braz de Aviz	18 February 2012	
Sant'Eugenio (basilica), title pro hac vice	Julián Herranz Casado	21 October 2003 (Note: Elevated pro hac vice to a title on 12 June 2014)	
Sant'Eustachio (basilica)	Rolandas Makrickas	7 December 2024	
San Filippo Neri in Eurosia	Fabio Baggio	7 December 2024	
San Francesco di Paola ai Monti †	Vacant on the death of Renato Raffaele Martino	28 October 2024	
San Francesco Saverio alla Garbatella, title pro hac vice	Franc Rodé	24 March 2006 (Note: Elevated pro hac vice to a title on 20 June 2016)	
Gesù Buon Pastore alla Montagnola	Lazzaro You Heung-sik	27 August 2022	
San Giorgio in Velabro, title pro hac vice	Gianfranco Ravasi	20 November 2010	
San Giovanni Bosco in Via Tuscolana (basilica), title pro hac vice	Robert Sarah	20 November 2010	
San Giovanni della Pigna, title pro hac vice	Raffaele Farina	24 November 2007	
San Girolamo della Carità a Via Giulia †	Vacant on the death of Miguel Ángel Ayuso Guixot	25 November 2024	
San Giuliano dei Fiamminghi, title pro hac vice	Walter Brandmüller	20 November 2010	
San Giuliano Martire	Kevin Joseph Farrell	19 November 2016	
San Giuseppe dei Falegnami, title pro hac vice	Francesco Coccopalmerio	18 February 2012	
San Giuseppe in Via Trionfale (basilica) †	Vacant on the death of Emil Paul Tscherrig	12 May 2026	
Sant'Ignazio di Loyola in Campo Marzio	Luis Francisco Ladaria Ferrer	28 June 2018	
San Lino	Giovanni Angelo Becciu	28 June 2018	
San Lorenzo in Piscibus †	Vacant on the death of Paul Josef Cordes	15 March 2024	
Santa Lucia del Gonfalone	Aquilino Bocos Merino	28 June 2018	
Santa Maria Ausiliatrice in Via Tuscolana (basilica)	Ángel Fernández Artime	30 September 2023	
Santa Maria del Divino Amore a Castel di Leva	Enrico Feroci	28 November 2020	
Santa Maria della Mercede e Sant'Adriano a Villa Albani	Fernando Vérgez Alzaga	27 August 2022	
Santa Maria della Scala	Ernest Simoni	19 November 2016	
Santa Maria delle Grazie alle Fornaci fuori Porta Cavalleggeri	Mario Zenari	19 November 2016	
Santa Maria Goretti	Agostino Marchetto	30 September 2023	
Santa Maria Immacolata all'Esquilino	Konrad Krajewski	28 June 2018	
Santa Maria in Aquiro †	Vacant on the death of Angelo Amato	31 December 2024	
Santa Maria in Cosmedin (basilica) †	Vacant on the transfer of Francesco Roberti	26 June 1967	
Santa Maria in Domnica	Marcello Semeraro	28 November 2020	
Santa Maria in Portico [Campitelli]	Michael Louis Fitzgerald	5 October 2019	
Santa Maria in Via Lata (basilica)	Fortunato Frezza	27 August 2022	
Santa Maria Liberatrice a Monte Testaccio, title pro hac vice	Giovanni Lajolo	24 November 2007	
Santa Maria Odigitria dei Siciliani †	Vacant on the death of Paolo Romeo	25 October 2026	
San Michele Arcangelo	Michael Czerny	5 October 2019	
Santa Monica degli Agostiniani †	Vacant upon the promotion of Robert Francis Prevost to cardinal bishop	6 February 2025	
San Nicola in Carcere (basilica)	Silvano Maria Tomasi	28 November 2020	
Santissimo Nome di Gesù	Gianfranco Ghirlanda	27 August 2022	
Santissimo Nome di Maria al Foro Traiano	Mauro Gambetti	28 November 2020	
Santissimi Nomi di Gesù e Maria in Via Lata	Timothy Radcliffe	7 December 2024	
Nostra Signora del Sacro Cuore, title pro hac vice	Kurt Koch	20 November 2010	
Nostra Signora di Coromoto in San Giovanni di Dio	Fernando Filoni	18 February 2012	
Ognissanti in Via Appia Nuova, title pro hac vice	Walter Kasper	21 February 2001 (Note: Elevated pro hac vice to a title on 21 February 2011)	
San Paolo alla Regola, title pro hac vice	Francesco Monterisi	20 November 2010	
San Paolo alle Tre Fontane, title pro hac vice	Mauro Piacenza	20 November 2010	
San Pier Damiani ai Monti di San Paolo, title pro hac vice	Agostino Vallini	24 March 2006 (Note: Elevated pro hac vice to a title on 24 February 2009)	
San Pio V a Villa Carpegna, title pro hac vice	James Michael Harvey	24 November 2012	
San Ponziano, title pro hac vice	Santos Abril y Castelló	18 February 2012	
San Saba (basilica)	Arthur Roche	27 August 2022	
San Salvatore in Lauro, title pro hac vice	Angelo Comastri	24 November 2007	
San Sebastiano al Palatino, title pro hac vice	Edwin Frederick O'Brien	18 February 2012	
Santo Spirito in Sassia	Dominique Mamberti	14 February 2015	
Santi Urbano e Lorenzo a Prima Porta	Víctor Manuel Fernández	30 September 2023	
Santi Vito, Modesto e Crescenzia, title pro hac vice	Giuseppe Bertello	18 February 2012	

== Suburbicarian dioceses ==
As many as six cardinal bishops may be assigned titles not to a titular church or deaconry but instead to suffragan dioceses known as suburbicarian dioceses. These are dioceses located within the ecclesiastical province of the Diocese of Rome. Suburbicarian dioceses are not titular churches, but serve a similar function as honorary assignments that signify the cardinals' relationship with the pope.

Since 1914, the title of a seventh suburbicarian diocese, that of Ostia, has been assigned ex officio to the dean of the College of Cardinals, in addition to that of his first suburbicarian diocese.

† Vacant

Suburbicarian diocese	Cardinal	Since	References
Albano	Luis Antonio Tagle	24 May 2025	
Frascati	Tarcisio Bertone	10 May 2008	
Ostia	Luis Antonio Tagle	9 October 2026	
Palestrina	José Saraiva Martins	24 February 2009	
Porto–Santa Rufina	Beniamino Stella	1 May 2020	
Sabina–Poggio Mirteto	Giovanni Battista Re	1 October 2002	
Velletri–Segni	Francis Arinze	25 April 2005	

== See also ==
- List of current cardinals
- Churches of Rome
- National churches in Rome
