= List of current cardinals =

Choir dress of a cardinal, in scarlet

Cardinals are senior members of the clergy of the Catholic Church. As titular members of the clergy of the Diocese of Rome, they serve as advisors to the pope, who is the bishop of Rome. They are typically ordained bishops and generally hold important roles within the church, such as leading prominent archdioceses or heading dicasteries within the Roman Curia. Cardinals are chosen by the pope and formally created in a consistory, and one of their foremost duties is the election of a new pope – invariably from among their number, although not strictly a requirement – when the Holy See is vacant (sede vacante), following the death or resignation of a pope. Collectively, they constitute the College of Cardinals.

Under current ecclesiastical law, as defined by the apostolic constitution Universi Dominici gregis (1996), only cardinals who have not passed their 80th birthdays on the day on which the Holy See becomes vacant are eligible to take part in a papal conclave to elect a new pope. The same apostolic constitution specifies that no more than 120 cardinals may take part in a conclave, but makes no provision for there being more than 120 eligible cardinal electors, a number that has often been exceeded. Cardinals may be created in pectore (lit. 'in the breast'), in which case the pope does not reveal their identities; they are not entitled to the privileges of a cardinal until their names are published by the pope. The creations of any such cardinals whose names have not been revealed before the pope's death or resignation automatically lapse.

As of 25 October 2026, there are 239 cardinals, 116 of whom are cardinal electors. The most recent consistory for the creation of cardinals was held on 7 December 2024, when Pope Francis created 21 cardinals, including 20 cardinal electors. Michael Czerny was the most recent cardinal elector to turn 80, on 18 July 2026. Thomas Collins will be the next cardinal elector to turn 80, on 16 January 2027. The most recent death of a cardinal was that of Paolo Romeo on 25 October 2026, at the age of 88.

== Orders of the College of Cardinals, and order of precedence ==
The College of Cardinals is divided into three orders, with formal precedence in the following sequence:

1. Cardinal bishops (CB): six cardinals who are chosen by the pope to be titular bishops of the seven suburbicarian dioceses in the vicinity of Rome, plus a few additional cardinals who have been exceptionally "co-opted" as cardinal bishops, as well as patriarchs who lead one of the Eastern Catholic Churches. (Note: Each cardinal bishop is titularly assigned to one of the seven suburbicarian dioceses, with the exception of the dean of the College of Cardinals, who is the titular bishop of the Suburbicarian Diocese of Ostia ex officio, in addition to his original suburbicarian diocese when first appointed a cardinal bishop. "Co-opted" cardinal bishops and Eastern Catholic patriarchs are not assigned to a suburbicarian diocese.) The two most senior cardinal bishops, who are elected by the cardinal bishops (excluding the Eastern Catholic patriarchs) from among themselves with papal approval, are the dean and the vice dean, currently Luis Antonio Tagle and Leonardo Sandri, respectively. The former is also the senior cardinal bishop among the electors. (Note: Among the cardinal electors, the senior cardinal bishop, the senior cardinal priest, the senior cardinal deacon and the junior cardinal deacon have specific roles in a papal conclave, such as presiding over the conclave itself (the senior cardinal bishop) or announcing the election of the pope (the senior cardinal deacon).)
2. Cardinal priests (CP): bishops and archbishops, typically in charge of dioceses around the world, as well as former cardinal deacons who have opted to be elevated to become cardinal priests. The most senior cardinal priest is the protopriest, currently Michael Michai Kitbunchu; among the cardinal electors, the senior cardinal priest is currently Peter Turkson.
3. Cardinal deacons (CD): bishops and archbishops who work in the Roman Curia or the diplomatic service of the Holy See, and all other clergy, including priests who have been granted a dispensation from the normal requirement that a person must be consecrated a bishop before becoming a cardinal. A cardinal deacon may opt (Latin: optatio) to become a cardinal priest after having served as a cardinal deacon for ten years. The most senior cardinal deacon is the protodeacon, currently Dominique Mamberti; he is also the senior cardinal deacon among the cardinal electors. The junior cardinal deacon is currently George Koovakad; he is also the junior cardinal deacon among the electors.

For cardinal bishops (excluding the Eastern Catholic patriarchs), the dean is first in precedence, followed by the vice dean and then, in order of appointment as cardinal bishops, by the remainder. For cardinal bishops who are Eastern Catholic patriarchs, for cardinal priests and for cardinal deacons, precedence is determined by the date of the consistory in which they were created cardinals and then by the order in which they appeared in the official announcement or bulletin.

All cardinals listed are members of the Latin Church unless otherwise stated. Cardinals belonging to institutes of consecrated life or societies of apostolic life are indicated by the relevant post-nominal letters. Cardinals in pastoral ministry are classified under the country in which their respective dioceses are located, although they may be citizens of another country.

== Cardinals: listed in order of precedence ==
* Cardinals ineligible to participate in a papal conclave

Rank	Name	Country	Born	Order	Consistory	Office	Ref.
1	Luis Antonio Tagle	Philippines	21 June 1957 (age 69)	CB	24 November 2012 (Note: Originally created a cardinal priest; co-opted as a cardinal bishop on 1 May 2020); Benedict XVI	Pro-Prefect of the Dicastery for Evangelization (Note: Since 9 May 2025, this office in the Roman Curia has been exercised provisionally following the election of Pope Leo XIV.) (Dean)	
2	Leonardo Sandri*	Argentina	18 November 1943 (age 82)	CB	24 November 2007 (Note: Originally created a cardinal deacon; became a cardinal priest on 19 May 2018 and co-opted as a cardinal bishop on 28 June 2018); Benedict XVI	Prefect emeritus of the Dicastery for the Eastern Churches (Vice Dean)	
3	Giovanni Battista Re*	Italy	30 January 1934 (age 92)	CB	21 February 2001 (Note: Originally created a cardinal priest; appointed a cardinal bishop on 1 October 2002); John Paul II	Prefect emeritus of the Congregation for Bishops (Dean emeritus)	
4	Francis Arinze*	Nigeria	1 November 1932 (age 94)	CB	25 May 1985 (Note: Originally created a cardinal deacon; became a cardinal priest on 29 January 1996 and appointed a cardinal bishop on 25 April 2005); John Paul II	Prefect emeritus of the Congregation for Divine Worship and the Discipline of the Sacraments	
5	Tarcisio Bertone SDB*	Italy	2 December 1934 (age 91)	CB	21 October 2003 (Note: Originally created a cardinal priest; appointed a cardinal bishop on 10 May 2008); John Paul II	Secretary of State emeritus of His Holiness and Camerlengo emeritus of the Holy Roman Church	
6	José Saraiva Martins CMF*	Portugal	6 January 1932 (age 94)	CB	21 February 2001 (Note: Originally created a cardinal deacon; appointed a cardinal bishop on 24 February 2009); John Paul II	Prefect emeritus of the Congregation for the Causes of Saints	
7	Pietro Parolin	Italy	17 January 1955 (age 71)	CB	22 February 2014 (Note: Originally created a cardinal priest; co-opted as a cardinal bishop on 28 June 2018); Francis	Secretary of State of His Holiness	
8	Marc Ouellet PSS*	Canada	8 June 1944 (age 82)	CB	21 October 2003; John Paul II	Prefect emeritus of the Dicastery for Bishops	
9	Fernando Filoni*	Italy	15 April 1946 (age 80)	CB	18 February 2012 (Note: Originally created a cardinal deacon; co-opted as a cardinal bishop on 28 June 2018); Benedict XVI	Grand Master of the Order of the Holy Sepulchre	
10	Beniamino Stella*	Italy	18 August 1941 (age 85)	CB	22 February 2014 (Note: Originally created a cardinal deacon; appointed a cardinal bishop on 1 May 2020); Francis	Prefect emeritus of the Congregation for the Clergy	
11	Bechara Boutros al-Rahi OMM*	Lebanon	25 February 1940 (age 86)	CB	24 November 2012; Benedict XVI	Patriarch of Antioch (Maronite Church)	
12	Louis Raphaël I Sako	Iraq	4 July 1948 (age 78)	CB	28 June 2018; Francis	Patriarch emeritus of Baghdad (Chaldean Church)	
13	Michael Michai Kitbunchu*	Thailand	25 January 1929 (age 97)	CP	2 February 1983; John Paul II	Archbishop emeritus of Bangkok	
14	Paul Poupard*	France	30 August 1930 (age 96)	CP	25 May 1985 (Note: Originally created a cardinal deacon; became a cardinal priest on 29 January 1996); John Paul II	President emeritus of the Pontifical Councils for Culture and for Interreligious Dialogue	
15	Friedrich Wetter*	Germany	20 February 1928 (age 98)	CP	25 May 1985; John Paul II	Archbishop emeritus of Munich and Freising	
16	Nicolás de Jesús López Rodríguez*	Dominican Republic	31 October 1936 (age 90)	CP	28 June 1991; John Paul II	Archbishop emeritus of Santo Domingo	
17	Roger Mahony*	United States	27 February 1936 (age 90)	CP	28 June 1991; John Paul II	Archbishop emeritus of Los Angeles	
18	Julius Darmaatmadja SJ*	Indonesia	20 December 1934 (age 91)	CP	26 November 1994; John Paul II	Archbishop emeritus of Jakarta	
19	Emmanuel Wamala*	Uganda	15 December 1926 (age 99)	CP	26 November 1994; John Paul II	Archbishop emeritus of Kampala	
20	Adam Maida*	United States	18 March 1930 (age 96)	CP	26 November 1994; John Paul II	Archbishop emeritus of Detroit	
21	Vinko Puljić*	Bosnia and Herzegovina	8 September 1945 (age 81)	CP	26 November 1994; John Paul II	Archbishop emeritus of Vrhbosna	
22	Juan Sandoval Íñiguez*	Mexico	28 March 1933 (age 93)	CP	26 November 1994; John Paul II	Archbishop emeritus of Guadalajara	
23	James Stafford*	United States	26 July 1932 (age 94)	CP	21 February 1998 (Note: Originally created a cardinal deacon; became a cardinal priest on 1 March 2008); John Paul II	Major Penitentiary emeritus	
24	Salvatore De Giorgi*	Italy	6 September 1930 (age 96)	CP	21 February 1998; John Paul II	Archbishop emeritus of Palermo	
25	Antonio María Rouco Varela*	Spain	20 August 1936 (age 90)	CP	21 February 1998; John Paul II	Archbishop emeritus of Madrid	
26	Christoph Schönborn OP*	Austria (Note: Schönborn was born to a Sudeten German family in the Sudetenland (in the present-day Czech Republic), then part of Nazi Germany. His family was later expelled from Czechoslovakia to Austria, and he served as a bishop there from 1991 to 2025.)	22 January 1945 (age 81)	CP	21 February 1998; John Paul II	Archbishop emeritus of Vienna	
27	Norberto Rivera Carrera*	Mexico	6 June 1942 (age 84)	CP	21 February 1998; John Paul II	Archbishop emeritus of Mexico	
28	Jānis Pujats*	Latvia	14 November 1930 (age 95)	CP	21 February 1998 (Note: Pujats was originally created a cardinal in pectore and formally revealed on 21 February 2001.); John Paul II	Archbishop emeritus of Riga	
29	Crescenzio Sepe*	Italy	2 June 1943 (age 83)	CP	21 February 2001 (Note: Originally created a cardinal deacon; became a cardinal priest on 20 May 2006); John Paul II	Archbishop emeritus of Naples	
30	Walter Kasper*	Germany	5 March 1933 (age 93)	CP	21 February 2001 (Note: Originally created a cardinal deacon; became a cardinal priest on 21 February 2011); John Paul II	President emeritus of the Pontifical Council for Promoting Christian Unity	
31	Audrys Bačkis*	Lithuania	1 February 1937 (age 89)	CP	21 February 2001; John Paul II	Archbishop emeritus of Vilnius	
32	Francisco Javier Errázuriz Ossa ISch*	Chile	5 September 1933 (age 93)	CP	21 February 2001; John Paul II	Archbishop emeritus of Santiago de Chile	
33	Wilfrid Napier OFM*	South Africa	8 March 1941 (age 85)	CP	21 February 2001; John Paul II	Archbishop emeritus of Durban	
34	Óscar Rodríguez Maradiaga SDB*	Honduras	29 December 1942 (age 83)	CP	21 February 2001; John Paul II	Archbishop emeritus of Tegucigalpa and Coordinator emeritus of the Council of Cardinals	
35	Juan Luis Cipriani Thorne*	Peru	28 December 1943 (age 82)	CP	21 February 2001; John Paul II	Archbishop emeritus of Lima	
36	Julián Herranz Casado*	Spain	31 March 1930 (age 96)	CP	21 October 2003 (Note: Originally created a cardinal deacon; became a cardinal priest on 12 June 2014); John Paul II	President emeritus of the Pontifical Council for Legislative Texts	
37	Angelo Scola*	Italy	7 November 1941 (age 85)	CP	21 October 2003; John Paul II	Archbishop emeritus of Milan	
38	Anthony Olubunmi Okogie*	Nigeria	16 June 1936 (age 90)	CP	21 October 2003; John Paul II	Archbishop emeritus of Lagos	
39	Gabriel Zubeir Wako*	Sudan	27 February 1941 (age 85)	CP	21 October 2003; John Paul II	Archbishop emeritus of Khartoum	
40	Justin Rigali*	United States	19 April 1935 (age 91)	CP	21 October 2003; John Paul II	Archbishop emeritus of Philadelphia	
41	Ennio Antonelli*	Italy	18 November 1936 (age 89)	CP	21 October 2003; John Paul II	President emeritus of the Pontifical Council for the Family	
42	Peter Turkson	Ghana	11 October 1948 (age 78)	CP	21 October 2003; John Paul II	Chancellor of the Pontifical Academy of Sciences and the Pontifical Academy of Social Sciences	
43	Josip Bozanić	Croatia	20 March 1949 (age 77)	CP	21 October 2003; John Paul II	Archbishop emeritus of Zagreb	
44	Philippe Barbarin	France	17 October 1950 (age 76)	CP	21 October 2003; John Paul II	Archbishop emeritus of Lyon	
45	Péter Erdő	Hungary	25 June 1952 (age 74)	CP	21 October 2003; John Paul II	Archbishop of Esztergom–Budapest	
46	Franc Rodé CM*	Slovenia	23 September 1934 (age 92)	CP	24 March 2006 (Note: Originally created a cardinal deacon; became a cardinal priest on 20 June 2016); Benedict XVI	Prefect emeritus of the Congregation for Institutes of Consecrated Life and Societies of Apostolic Life	
47	Agostino Vallini*	Italy	17 April 1940 (age 86)	CP	24 March 2006; Benedict XVI	Pontifical Legate emeritus for the Basilicas of Saint Francis and Saint Mary of the Angels in Assisi	
48	Gaudencio Borbon Rosales*	Philippines	10 August 1932 (age 94)	CP	24 March 2006; Benedict XVI	Archbishop emeritus of Manila	
49	Jean-Pierre Ricard*	France	25 September 1944 (age 82)	CP	24 March 2006; Benedict XVI	Archbishop emeritus of Bordeaux	
50	Antonio Cañizares Llovera*	Spain	15 October 1945 (age 81)	CP	24 March 2006; Benedict XVI	Archbishop emeritus of Valencia	
51	Seán Patrick O'Malley OFMCap*	United States	29 June 1944 (age 82)	CP	24 March 2006; Benedict XVI	Archbishop emeritus of Boston and President emeritus of the Pontifical Commission for the Protection of Minors	
52	Stanisław Dziwisz*	Poland	27 April 1939 (age 87)	CP	24 March 2006; Benedict XVI	Archbishop emeritus of Kraków	
53	Joseph Zen Ze-kiun SDB*	China (Hong Kong) (Note: Hong Kong is a special administrative region of China.)	13 January 1932 (age 94)	CP	24 March 2006; Benedict XVI	Bishop emeritus of Hong Kong	
54	Giovanni Lajolo*	Italy	3 January 1935 (age 91)	CP	24 November 2007 (Note: Originally created a cardinal deacon; became a cardinal priest on 19 May 2018); Benedict XVI	President emeritus of the Pontifical Commission for Vatican City State	
55	Angelo Comastri*	Italy	17 September 1943 (age 83)	CP	24 November 2007; Benedict XVI	Vicar General emeritus for Vatican City, Archpriest emeritus of the Papal Basilica of Saint Peter and President emeritus of the Fabric of Saint Peter	
56	Stanisław Ryłko*	Poland	4 July 1945 (age 81)	CP	24 November 2007; Benedict XVI	Archpriest emeritus of the Papal Basilica of Saint Mary Major	
57	Raffaele Farina SDB*	Italy	24 September 1933 (age 93)	CP	24 November 2007; Benedict XVI	Archivist and Librarian emeritus of the Holy Roman Church	
58	Seán Brady*	Ireland (Note: Brady's territorial jurisdiction as Archbishop of Armagh included a part of the United Kingdom.)	16 August 1939 (age 87)	CP	24 November 2007; Benedict XVI	Archbishop emeritus of Armagh	
59	Lluís Martínez i Sistach*	Spain	29 April 1937 (age 89)	CP	24 November 2007; Benedict XVI	Archbishop emeritus of Barcelona	
60	Angelo Bagnasco*	Italy	14 January 1943 (age 83)	CP	24 November 2007; Benedict XVI	Archbishop emeritus of Genoa	
61	Théodore-Adrien Sarr*	Senegal	28 November 1936 (age 89)	CP	24 November 2007; Benedict XVI	Archbishop emeritus of Dakar	
62	Oswald Gracias*	India	24 December 1944 (age 81)	CP	24 November 2007; Benedict XVI	Archbishop emeritus of Bombay	
63	Francisco Robles Ortega	Mexico	2 March 1949 (age 77)	CP	24 November 2007; Benedict XVI	Archbishop of Guadalajara	
64	Daniel DiNardo	United States	23 May 1949 (age 77)	CP	24 November 2007; Benedict XVI	Archbishop emeritus of Galveston–Houston	
65	Odilo Scherer	Brazil	21 September 1949 (age 77)	CP	24 November 2007; Benedict XVI	Archbishop of São Paulo	
66	John Njue*	Kenya	1 January 1946 (Note: The Holy See Press Office's documentation gives Njue's date of birth as 1 January 1946, but previously stated that he was "born in 1944" and used 31 December 1944 as his date of birth on its list of cardinal electors.) (age 80)	CP	24 November 2007; Benedict XVI	Archbishop emeritus of Nairobi	
67	Robert Sarah*	Guinea	15 June 1945 (age 81)	CP	20 November 2010 (Note: Originally created a cardinal deacon; became a cardinal priest on 3 May 2021); Benedict XVI	Prefect emeritus of the Congregation for Divine Worship and the Discipline of the Sacraments	
68	Francesco Monterisi*	Italy	28 May 1934 (age 92)	CP	20 November 2010; Benedict XVI	Archpriest emeritus of the Papal Basilica of Saint Paul Outside the Walls	
69	Raymond Leo Burke	United States	30 June 1948 (age 78)	CP	20 November 2010; Benedict XVI	Patron emeritus of the Sovereign Military Order of Malta	
70	Kurt Koch	Switzerland	15 March 1950 (age 76)	CP	20 November 2010; Benedict XVI	Prefect of the Dicastery for Promoting Christian Unity	
71	Mauro Piacenza*	Italy	15 September 1944 (age 82)	CP	20 November 2010; Benedict XVI	Major Penitentiary emeritus	
72	Gianfranco Ravasi*	Italy	18 October 1942 (age 84)	CP	20 November 2010; Benedict XVI	President emeritus of the Pontifical Council for Culture	
73	Donald Wuerl*	United States	12 November 1940 (age 85)	CP	20 November 2010; Benedict XVI	Archbishop emeritus of Washington	
74	Raymundo Damasceno Assis*	Brazil	15 February 1937 (age 89)	CP	20 November 2010; Benedict XVI	Archbishop emeritus of Aparecida	
75	Kazimierz Nycz	Poland	1 February 1950 (age 76)	CP	20 November 2010; Benedict XVI	Archbishop emeritus of Warsaw	
76	Malcolm Ranjith	Sri Lanka	15 November 1947 (age 78)	CP	20 November 2010; Benedict XVI	Archbishop of Colombo	
77	Reinhard Marx	Germany	21 September 1953 (age 73)	CP	20 November 2010; Benedict XVI	Archbishop of Munich and Freising and Coordinator of the Council for the Economy	
78	Walter Brandmüller*	Germany	5 January 1929 (age 97)	CP	20 November 2010; Benedict XVI	President emeritus of the Pontifical Committee for Historical Sciences	
79	Manuel Monteiro de Castro*	Portugal	29 March 1938 (age 88)	CP	18 February 2012 (Note: Originally created a cardinal deacon; became a cardinal priest on 4 March 2022); Benedict XVI	Major Penitentiary emeritus	
80	Santos Abril y Castelló*	Spain	21 September 1935 (age 91)	CP	18 February 2012; Benedict XVI	Archpriest emeritus of the Papal Basilica of Saint Mary Major	
81	Antonio Maria Vegliò*	Italy	3 February 1938 (age 88)	CP	18 February 2012; Benedict XVI	President emeritus of the Pontifical Council for the Pastoral Care of Migrants and Itinerant People	
82	Giuseppe Bertello*	Italy	1 October 1942 (age 84)	CP	18 February 2012; Benedict XVI	President emeritus of the Pontifical Commission for Vatican City State	
83	Francesco Coccopalmerio*	Italy	6 March 1938 (age 88)	CP	18 February 2012; Benedict XVI	President emeritus of the Pontifical Council for Legislative Texts	
84	João Braz de Aviz	Brazil	24 April 1947 (age 79)	CP	18 February 2012; Benedict XVI	Prefect emeritus of the Dicastery for Institutes of Consecrated Life and Societies of Apostolic Life	
85	Edwin Frederick O'Brien*	United States	8 April 1939 (age 87)	CP	18 February 2012; Benedict XVI	Grand Master emeritus of the Order of the Holy Sepulchre	
86	Domenico Calcagno*	Italy	3 February 1943 (age 83)	CP	18 February 2012; Benedict XVI	President emeritus of the Administration of the Patrimony of the Apostolic See	
87	Giuseppe Versaldi*	Italy	30 July 1943 (age 83)	CP	18 February 2012; Benedict XVI	Prefect emeritus of the Congregation for Catholic Education	
88	George Alencherry*	India	19 April 1945 (age 81)	CP	18 February 2012; Benedict XVI	Major Archbishop emeritus of Ernakulam–Angamaly (Syro-Malabar Church)	
89	Thomas Collins	Canada	16 January 1947 (age 79)	CP	18 February 2012; Benedict XVI	Archbishop emeritus of Toronto	
90	Wim Eijk	Netherlands	22 June 1953 (age 73)	CP	18 February 2012; Benedict XVI	Archbishop of Utrecht	
91	Giuseppe Betori	Italy	25 February 1947 (age 79)	CP	18 February 2012; Benedict XVI	Archbishop emeritus of Florence	
92	Timothy M. Dolan	United States	6 February 1950 (age 76)	CP	18 February 2012; Benedict XVI	Archbishop emeritus of New York	
93	Rainer Woelki	Germany	18 August 1956 (age 70)	CP	18 February 2012; Benedict XVI	Archbishop of Cologne	
94	John Tong Hon*	China (Hong Kong)	31 July 1939 (age 87)	CP	18 February 2012; Benedict XVI	Bishop emeritus of Hong Kong	
95	James Michael Harvey	United States	20 October 1949 (age 77)	CP	24 November 2012 (Note: Originally created a cardinal deacon; became a cardinal priest on 1 July 2024); Benedict XVI	Archpriest of the Papal Basilica of Saint Paul Outside the Walls	
96	Baselios Cleemis	India	15 June 1959 (age 67)	CP	24 November 2012; Benedict XVI	Major Archbishop of Trivandrum (Syro-Malankara Church)	
97	John Onaiyekan*	Nigeria	29 January 1944 (age 82)	CP	24 November 2012; Benedict XVI	Archbishop emeritus of Abuja	
98	Rubén Salazar Gómez*	Colombia	22 September 1942 (age 84)	CP	24 November 2012; Benedict XVI	Archbishop emeritus of Bogotá	
99	Lorenzo Baldisseri*	Italy	29 September 1940 (age 86)	CP	22 February 2014; Francis	Secretary-General emeritus of the Synod of Bishops	
100	Gerhard Ludwig Müller	Germany	31 December 1947 (age 78)	CP	22 February 2014; Francis	Prefect emeritus of the Congregation for the Doctrine of the Faith	
101	Vincent Nichols*	United Kingdom	8 November 1945 (age 81)	CP	22 February 2014; Francis	Archbishop emeritus of Westminster	
102	Leopoldo Brenes	Nicaragua	7 March 1949 (age 77)	CP	22 February 2014; Francis	Archbishop of Managua	
103	Gérald Lacroix ISPX	Canada	27 July 1957 (age 69)	CP	22 February 2014; Francis	Archbishop of Quebec	
104	Jean-Pierre Kutwa*	Ivory Coast	22 December 1945 (age 80)	CP	22 February 2014; Francis	Archbishop emeritus of Abidjan	
105	Orani João Tempesta OCist	Brazil	23 June 1950 (age 76)	CP	22 February 2014; Francis	Archbishop of São Sebastião do Rio de Janeiro	
106	Gualtiero Bassetti*	Italy	7 April 1942 (age 84)	CP	22 February 2014; Francis	Archbishop emeritus of Perugia–Città della Pieve	
107	Mario Aurelio Poli	Argentina	29 November 1947 (age 78)	CP	22 February 2014; Francis	Archbishop emeritus of Buenos Aires	
108	Andrew Yeom Soo-jung*	South Korea	5 December 1943 (age 82)	CP	22 February 2014; Francis	Archbishop emeritus of Seoul	
109	Ricardo Ezzati SDB*	Chile (Note: Ezzati was born in Italy, emigrated to Chile as a young man, and served as a bishop there from 1996 to 2019.)	7 January 1942 (age 84)	CP	22 February 2014; Francis	Archbishop emeritus of Santiago de Chile	
110	Philippe Ouédraogo*	Burkina Faso	31 December 1945 (Note: Ouédraogo's actual date of birth is unknown. In the 2024 edition of the Annuario Pontificio, the annual directory of the Holy See, his birth date was revised from 25 January 1945 to 31 December, a placeholder date used by the Burkina Faso government. Ouédraogo adopted 25 January as his date of birth "at random" to enrol in a health-insurance programme in 1973.) (age 80)	CP	22 February 2014; Francis	Archbishop emeritus of Ouagadougou	
111	Orlando Quevedo OMI*	Philippines	11 March 1939 (age 87)	CP	22 February 2014; Francis	Archbishop emeritus of Cotabato	
112	Chibly Langlois	Haiti	29 November 1958 (age 67)	CP	22 February 2014; Francis	Bishop of Les Cayes	
113	Manuel Clemente	Portugal	16 July 1948 (age 78)	CP	14 February 2015; Francis	Patriarch emeritus of Lisbon	
114	Berhaneyesus Demerew Souraphiel CM	Ethiopia	14 July 1948 (age 78)	CP	14 February 2015; Francis	Archbishop emeritus of Addis Abeba (Ethiopian Church)	
115	John Dew	New Zealand	5 May 1948 (age 78)	CP	14 February 2015; Francis	Archbishop emeritus of Wellington	
116	Pierre Nguyễn Văn Nhơn*	Vietnam	1 April 1938 (age 88)	CP	14 February 2015; Francis	Archbishop emeritus of Hanoi	
117	Alberto Suárez Inda*	Mexico	30 January 1939 (age 87)	CP	14 February 2015; Francis	Archbishop emeritus of Morelia	
118	Charles Maung Bo SDB	Myanmar	29 October 1948 (age 78)	CP	14 February 2015; Francis	Archbishop of Yangon	
119	Kriengsak Kovitvanit	Thailand	27 June 1949 (age 77)	CP	14 February 2015; Francis	Archbishop emeritus of Bangkok	
120	Francesco Montenegro*	Italy	22 May 1946 (age 80)	CP	14 February 2015; Francis	Archbishop emeritus of Agrigento	
121	Daniel Sturla SDB	Uruguay	4 July 1959 (age 67)	CP	14 February 2015; Francis	Archbishop of Montevideo	
122	Ricardo Blázquez*	Spain	13 April 1942 (age 84)	CP	14 February 2015; Francis	Archbishop emeritus of Valladolid	
123	José Luis Lacunza Maestrojuán OAR*	Panama (Note: Lacunza Maestrojuán was born in Spain and served as a bishop in Panama from 1985 to 2024.)	24 February 1944 (age 82)	CP	14 February 2015; Francis	Bishop emeritus of David	
124	Arlindo Gomes Furtado	Cape Verde	15 November 1949 (age 76)	CP	14 February 2015; Francis	Bishop emeritus of Santiago de Cabo Verde	
125	Soane Patita Paini Mafi	Tonga	19 December 1961 (age 64)	CP	14 February 2015; Francis	Bishop of Tonga	
126	Luis Héctor Villalba*	Argentina	11 October 1934 (age 92)	CP	14 February 2015; Francis	Archbishop emeritus of Tucumán	
127	Dieudonné Nzapalainga CSSp	Central African Republic	14 March 1967 (age 59)	CP	19 November 2016; Francis	Archbishop of Bangui	
128	Carlos Osoro Sierra*	Spain	16 May 1945 (age 81)	CP	19 November 2016; Francis	Archbishop emeritus of Madrid	
129	Sérgio da Rocha	Brazil	21 October 1959 (age 67)	CP	19 November 2016; Francis	Archbishop of São Salvador da Bahia	
130	Blase J. Cupich	United States	19 March 1949 (age 77)	CP	19 November 2016; Francis	Archbishop of Chicago	
131	Patrick D'Rozario CSC*	Bangladesh	1 October 1943 (age 83)	CP	19 November 2016; Francis	Archbishop emeritus of Dhaka	
132	Baltazar Enrique Porras Cardozo*	Venezuela	10 October 1944 (age 82)	CP	19 November 2016; Francis	Archbishop emeritus of Caracas	
133	Jozef De Kesel	Belgium	17 June 1947 (age 79)	CP	19 November 2016; Francis	Archbishop emeritus of Mechelen–Brussels	
134	Maurice Piat CSSp*	Mauritius	19 July 1941 (age 85)	CP	19 November 2016; Francis	Bishop emeritus of Port-Louis	
135	Carlos Aguiar Retes	Mexico	9 January 1950 (age 76)	CP	19 November 2016; Francis	Archbishop of Mexico	
136	John Ribat MSC	Papua New Guinea	9 February 1957 (age 69)	CP	19 November 2016; Francis	Archbishop of Port Moresby	
137	Joseph W. Tobin CSsR	United States	3 May 1952 (age 74)	CP	19 November 2016; Francis	Archbishop of Newark	
138	Jean Zerbo*	Mali	27 December 1943 (age 82)	CP	28 June 2017; Francis	Archbishop emeritus of Bamako	
139	Juan José Omella*	Spain	21 April 1946 (age 80)	CP	28 June 2017; Francis	Archbishop emeritus of Barcelona	
140	Anders Arborelius OCD	Sweden	24 September 1949 (age 77)	CP	28 June 2017; Francis	Bishop of Stockholm	
141	Louis-Marie Ling Mangkhanekhoun IVD*	Laos	8 April 1944 (age 82)	CP	28 June 2017; Francis	Apostolic Vicar emeritus of Vientiane	
142	Gregorio Rosa Chávez*	El Salvador	3 September 1942 (age 84)	CP	28 June 2017; Francis	Auxiliary Bishop emeritus of San Salvador	
143	Angelo De Donatis	Italy	4 January 1954 (age 72)	CP	28 June 2018; Francis	Major Penitentiary	
144	Joseph Coutts*	Pakistan	21 July 1945 (age 81)	CP	28 June 2018; Francis	Archbishop emeritus of Karachi	
145	António Marto	Portugal	5 May 1947 (age 79)	CP	28 June 2018; Francis	Bishop emeritus of Leiria–Fátima	
146	Pedro Barreto SJ*	Peru	12 February 1944 (age 82)	CP	28 June 2018; Francis	Archbishop emeritus of Huancayo	
147	Désiré Tsarahazana	Madagascar	13 June 1954 (age 72)	CP	28 June 2018; Francis	Archbishop of Toamasina	
148	Giuseppe Petrocchi	Italy	19 August 1948 (age 78)	CP	28 June 2018; Francis	Archbishop emeritus of L'Aquila	
149	Thomas Aquino Manyo Maeda	Japan	3 March 1949 (age 77)	CP	28 June 2018; Francis	Archbishop of Osaka–Takamatsu	
150	Toribio Ticona Porco*	Bolivia	25 April 1937 (age 89)	CP	28 June 2018; Francis	Bishop Prelate emeritus of Corocoro	
151	Ignatius Suharyo Hardjoatmodjo	Indonesia	9 July 1950 (age 76)	CP	5 October 2019; Francis	Archbishop of Jakarta	
152	Juan García Rodríguez	Cuba	11 July 1948 (age 78)	CP	5 October 2019; Francis	Archbishop of San Cristóbal de la Habana	
153	Fridolin Ambongo Besungu OFMCap	Democratic Republic of the Congo	24 January 1960 (age 66)	CP	5 October 2019; Francis	Archbishop of Kinshasa	
154	Jean-Claude Hollerich SJ	Luxembourg	9 August 1958 (age 68)	CP	5 October 2019; Francis	Archbishop of Luxembourg	
155	Álvaro Leonel Ramazzini Imeri	Guatemala	16 July 1947 (age 79)	CP	5 October 2019; Francis	Bishop of Huehuetenango	
156	Matteo Zuppi	Italy	11 October 1955 (age 71)	CP	5 October 2019; Francis	Archbishop of Bologna	
157	Cristóbal López Romero SDB	Morocco (Note: López Romero was born in Spain and has served as a bishop in Morocco since 2018.)	19 May 1952 (age 74)	CP	5 October 2019; Francis	Archbishop of Rabat	
158	Sigitas Tamkevičius SJ*	Lithuania	7 November 1938 (age 88)	CP	5 October 2019; Francis	Archbishop emeritus of Kaunas	
159	Antoine Kambanda	Rwanda	10 November 1958 (age 68)	CP	28 November 2020; Francis	Archbishop of Kigali	
160	Wilton Daniel Gregory	United States	7 December 1947 (age 78)	CP	28 November 2020; Francis	Archbishop emeritus of Washington	
161	Jose Advincula OP	Philippines	30 March 1952 (age 74)	CP	28 November 2020; Francis	Archbishop of Manila	
162	Celestino Aós Braco OFMCap*	Chile (Note: Aós Braco was born in Spain and served as a bishop in Chile from 2014 to 2023.)	6 April 1945 (age 81)	CP	28 November 2020; Francis	Archbishop emeritus of Santiago de Chile	
163	Augusto Paolo Lojudice	Italy	1 July 1964 (age 62)	CP	28 November 2020; Francis	Archbishop of Siena–Colle di Val d'Elsa–Montalcino and Bishop of Montepulciano–Chiusi–Pienza	
164	Felipe Arizmendi Esquivel*	Mexico	1 May 1940 (age 86)	CP	28 November 2020; Francis	Bishop emeritus of San Cristóbal de Las Casas	
165	Jean-Marc Aveline	France	26 December 1958 (age 67)	CP	27 August 2022; Francis	Archbishop of Marseille	
166	Peter Okpaleke	Nigeria	1 March 1963 (age 63)	CP	27 August 2022; Francis	Bishop of Ekwulobia	
167	Leonardo Ulrich Steiner OFM	Brazil	6 November 1950 (age 76)	CP	27 August 2022; Francis	Archbishop of Manaus	
168	Filipe Neri Ferrão	India	20 January 1953 (age 73)	CP	27 August 2022; Francis	Archbishop of Goa and Daman and Patriarch of the East Indies	
169	Robert W. McElroy	United States	5 February 1954 (age 72)	CP	27 August 2022; Francis	Archbishop of Washington	
170	Virgílio do Carmo da Silva SDB	East Timor	27 November 1967 (age 58)	CP	27 August 2022; Francis	Archbishop of Díli	
171	Oscar Cantoni	Italy	1 September 1950 (age 76)	CP	27 August 2022; Francis	Bishop of Como	
172	Anthony Poola	India	15 November 1961 (age 64)	CP	27 August 2022; Francis	Archbishop of Hyderabad	
173	Paulo Cezar Costa	Brazil	20 July 1967 (age 59)	CP	27 August 2022; Francis	Archbishop of Brasília	
174	William Goh	Singapore	25 June 1957 (age 69)	CP	27 August 2022; Francis	Archbishop of Singapore	
175	Adalberto Martínez Flores	Paraguay	8 July 1951 (age 75)	CP	27 August 2022; Francis	Archbishop of Asunción	
176	Giorgio Marengo IMC	Mongolia (Note: Marengo was born in Italy and has served as a bishop in Mongolia since 2020.)	7 June 1974 (age 52)	CP	27 August 2022; Francis	Apostolic Prefect of Ulaanbaatar	
177	Jorge Enrique Jiménez Carvajal CJM*	Colombia	29 March 1942 (age 84)	CP	27 August 2022; Francis	Archbishop emeritus of Cartagena	
178	Arrigo Miglio*	Italy	18 July 1942 (age 84)	CP	27 August 2022; Francis	Archbishop emeritus of Cagliari	
179	Pierbattista Pizzaballa OFM	Jerusalem (Note: The jurisdiction of the Latin Patriarchate of Jerusalem, based in the Church of the Holy Sepulchre in the Old City in East Jerusalem, is multinational and encompasses Cyprus, Jordan, Israel and Palestine. In its statistical report of the College of Cardinals, the Holy See Press Office lists Pizzaballa's country as "Jerusalem". Pizzaballa was born in Italy and has served as a bishop in Jerusalem since 2016.)	21 April 1965 (age 61)	CP	30 September 2023; Francis	Latin Patriarch of Jerusalem	
180	Stephen Brislin	South Africa	24 September 1956 (age 70)	CP	30 September 2023; Francis	Archbishop of Johannesburg	
181	Ángel Sixto Rossi SJ	Argentina	11 August 1958 (age 68)	CP	30 September 2023; Francis	Archbishop of Córdoba	
182	Luis José Rueda Aparicio	Colombia	3 March 1962 (age 64)	CP	30 September 2023; Francis	Archbishop of Bogotá	
183	Grzegorz Ryś	Poland	9 February 1964 (age 62)	CP	30 September 2023; Francis	Archbishop of Kraków	
184	Stephen Ameyu Martin Mulla	South Sudan	10 January 1964 (age 62)	CP	30 September 2023; Francis	Archbishop of Juba	
185	José Cobo Cano	Spain	20 September 1965 (age 61)	CP	30 September 2023; Francis	Archbishop of Madrid	
186	Protase Rugambwa	Tanzania	31 May 1960 (age 66)	CP	30 September 2023; Francis	Archbishop of Tabora	
187	Sebastian Francis	Malaysia	11 November 1951 (age 75)	CP	30 September 2023; Francis	Bishop of Penang	
188	Stephen Chow Sau-yan SJ	China (Hong Kong)	7 August 1959 (age 67)	CP	30 September 2023; Francis	Bishop of Hong Kong	
189	François-Xavier Bustillo OFMConv	France (Note: Bustillo was born in Spain and has served as a bishop in France since 2021.)	23 November 1968 (age 57)	CP	30 September 2023; Francis	Bishop of Ajaccio	
190	Américo Aguiar	Portugal	12 December 1973 (age 52)	CP	30 September 2023; Francis	Bishop of Setúbal	
191	Diego Rafael Padrón Sánchez*	Venezuela	17 May 1939 (age 87)	CP	30 September 2023; Francis	Archbishop emeritus of Cumaná	
192	Carlos Castillo Mattasoglio	Peru	28 February 1950 (age 76)	CP	7 December 2024; Francis	Archbishop of Lima	
193	Vicente Bokalic Iglic CM	Argentina	11 June 1952 (age 74)	CP	7 December 2024; Francis	Archbishop of Santiago del Estero	
194	Luis Cabrera Herrera OFM	Ecuador	11 October 1955 (age 71)	CP	7 December 2024; Francis	Archbishop of Guayaquil	
195	Fernando Chomalí	Chile	10 March 1957 (age 69)	CP	7 December 2024; Francis	Archbishop of Santiago de Chile	
196	Tarcisio Isao Kikuchi SVD	Japan	1 November 1958 (age 68)	CP	7 December 2024; Francis	Archbishop of Tokyo	
197	Pablo Virgilio David	Philippines	2 March 1959 (age 67)	CP	7 December 2024; Francis	Bishop of Kalookan	
198	Ladislav Nemet SVD	Serbia (Note: Nemet was born in Serbia into an ethnically Hungarian family and describes himself as Hungarian. He has worked in Serbia since 2008.)	7 September 1956 (age 70)	CP	7 December 2024; Francis	Archbishop of Belgrade	
199	Jaime Spengler OFM	Brazil	6 September 1960 (age 66)	CP	7 December 2024; Francis	Archbishop of Porto Alegre	
200	Ignace Bessi Dogbo	Ivory Coast	17 August 1961 (age 65)	CP	7 December 2024; Francis	Archbishop of Abidjan	
201	Jean-Paul Vesco OP	Algeria (Note: Vesco was born in France and has served as a bishop in Algeria since 2012.)	10 March 1962 (age 64)	CP	7 December 2024; Francis	Archbishop of Algiers	
202	Dominique Mathieu OFMConv	Iran (Note: Mathieu was born in Belgium and has served as a bishop in Iran since 2021.)	13 June 1963 (age 63)	CP	7 December 2024; Francis	Archbishop of Tehran–Isfahan	
203	Roberto Repole	Italy	29 January 1967 (age 59)	CP	7 December 2024; Francis	Archbishop of Turin and Bishop of Susa	
204	Baldassare Reina	Italy	26 November 1970 (age 55)	CP	7 December 2024; Francis	Vicar General for Rome and Archpriest of the Papal Basilica of Saint John Lateran	
205	Frank Leo	Canada	30 June 1971 (age 55)	CP	7 December 2024; Francis	Archbishop of Toronto	
206	Mykola Bychok CSsR	Australia (Note: Bychok was born in Ukraine and has served as a bishop in Australia since 2020.)	13 February 1980 (age 46)	CP	7 December 2024; Francis	Eparch of Saints Peter and Paul of Melbourne (Ukrainian Greek Church)	
207	Domenico Battaglia	Italy	20 January 1963 (age 63)	CP	7 December 2024; Francis	Archbishop of Naples	
208	Dominique Mamberti	France	7 March 1952 (age 74)	CD	14 February 2015; Francis	Prefect of the Supreme Tribunal of the Apostolic Signatura	
209	Mario Zenari*	Italy	5 January 1946 (age 80)	CD	19 November 2016; Francis	Apostolic Nuncio emeritus	
210	Kevin Farrell	United States (Note: Farrell was born in Ireland, was incardinated as a priest in the United States in 1984 and served as a bishop there from 2001 to 2016.)	2 September 1947 (age 79)	CD	19 November 2016; Francis	Prefect of the Dicastery for the Laity, Family and Life and Camerlengo of the Holy Roman Church	
211	Ernest Simoni*	Albania	18 October 1928 (age 98)	CD	19 November 2016; Francis	Priest of the Archdiocese of Shkodër–Pult (Note: Granted dispensation not to receive episcopal consecration)	
212	Luis Ladaria Ferrer SJ*	Spain	19 April 1944 (age 82)	CD	28 June 2018; Francis	Prefect emeritus of the Dicastery for the Doctrine of the Faith	
213	Giovanni Angelo Becciu* (Note: Becciu resigned the rights and privileges of a cardinal on 24 September 2020, making him ineligible to participate in a conclave as an elector since then.)	Italy	2 June 1948 (age 78)	CD	28 June 2018; Francis	Prefect emeritus of the Congregation for the Causes of Saints	
214	Konrad Krajewski	Poland	25 November 1963 (age 62)	CD	28 June 2018; Francis	Archbishop of Łódź	
215	Aquilino Bocos Merino CMF*	Spain	17 May 1938 (age 88)	CD	28 June 2018; Francis	Superior General emeritus of the Missionary Sons of the Immaculate Heart of Mary	
216	José Tolentino de Mendonça	Portugal	15 December 1965 (age 60)	CD	5 October 2019; Francis	Prefect of the Dicastery for Culture and Education	
217	Michael Czerny SJ*	Canada (Note: Czerny was born in Czechoslovakia (in the present-day Czech Republic) and emigrated to Canada as a child.)	18 July 1946 (age 80)	CD	5 October 2019; Francis	Prefect emeritus of the Dicastery for Promoting Integral Human Development	
218	Michael Fitzgerald MAfr*	United Kingdom	17 August 1937 (age 89)	CD	5 October 2019; Francis	Apostolic Nuncio emeritus	
219	Mario Grech	Malta	20 February 1957 (age 69)	CD	28 November 2020; Francis	Secretary-General of the Synod of Bishops	
220	Marcello Semeraro	Italy	22 December 1947 (age 78)	CD	28 November 2020; Francis	Prefect of the Dicastery for the Causes of Saints	
221	Mauro Gambetti OFMConv	Italy	27 October 1965 (age 61)	CD	28 November 2020; Francis	Archbishop of Chieti-Vasto	
222	Silvano Maria Tomasi CS*	Italy	12 October 1940 (age 86)	CD	28 November 2020; Francis	Special Delegate to the Sovereign Military Order of Malta	
223	Raniero Cantalamessa OFMCap*	Italy	22 July 1934 (age 92)	CD	28 November 2020; Francis	Preacher emeritus of the Papal Household	
224	Enrico Feroci*	Italy	27 August 1940 (age 86)	CD	28 November 2020; Francis	Pastor of the Shrine of Our Lady of Divine Love in Castel di Leva, Rome	
225	Arthur Roche	United Kingdom	6 March 1950 (age 76)	CD	27 August 2022; Francis	Prefect of the Dicastery for Divine Worship and the Discipline of the Sacraments	
226	Lazarus You Heung-sik	South Korea	17 November 1951 (age 74)	CD	27 August 2022; Francis	Prefect of the Dicastery for the Clergy	
227	Fernando Vérgez Alzaga LC*	Spain	1 March 1945 (age 81)	CD	27 August 2022; Francis	President emeritus of the Pontifical Commission for Vatican City State	
228	Gianfranco Ghirlanda SJ*	Italy	5 July 1942 (age 84)	CD	27 August 2022; Francis	Patron of the Sovereign Military Order of Malta	
229	Fortunato Frezza*	Italy	6 February 1942 (age 84)	CD	27 August 2022; Francis	Canon of the Chapter of the Papal Basilica of Saint Peter	
230	Claudio Gugerotti	Italy	7 October 1955 (age 71)	CD	30 September 2023; Francis	Prefect of the Dicastery for the Eastern Churches	
231	Víctor Manuel Fernández	Argentina	18 July 1962 (age 64)	CD	30 September 2023; Francis	Prefect of the Dicastery for the Doctrine of the Faith	
232	Christophe Pierre*	France	30 January 1946 (age 80)	CD	30 September 2023; Francis	Apostolic Nuncio emeritus	
233	Ángel Fernández Artime SDB	Spain	21 August 1960 (age 66)	CD	30 September 2023; Francis	Pro-Prefect of the Dicastery for Institutes of Consecrated Life and Societies of Apostolic Life	
234	Agostino Marchetto*	Italy	28 August 1940 (age 86)	CD	30 September 2023; Francis	Secretary emeritus of the Pontifical Council for the Pastoral Care of Migrants and Itinerant People	
235	Angelo Acerbi*	Italy	23 September 1925 (age 101)	CD	7 December 2024; Francis	Apostolic Nuncio emeritus	
236	Rolandas Makrickas	Lithuania	31 January 1972 (age 54)	CD	7 December 2024; Francis	Archpriest of the Papal Basilica of Saint Mary Major	
237	Timothy Radcliffe OP*	United Kingdom	22 August 1945 (age 81)	CD	7 December 2024; Francis	Master emeritus of the Order of Preachers	
238	Fabio Baggio CS	Italy	15 January 1965 (age 61)	CD	7 December 2024; Francis	Pro-Prefect of the Dicastery for Promoting Integral Human Development	
239	George Koovakad	India	11 August 1973 (age 53)	CD	7 December 2024; Francis	Prefect of the Dicastery for Interreligious Dialogue (Syro-Malabar Church)	

== Demographics of the College of Cardinals ==
As of 25 October 2026, 116 of 239 cardinals are eligible to participate in a papal conclave. The current threshold number of votes needed to be elected pope with the required two-thirds supermajority is 78, assuming that all 116 cardinal electors were to participate in a conclave.

=== Cardinals by appointing pope ===
This table indicates the number of current cardinals created by each pope and belonging to each order of the college.

Pope		All cardinals				Cardinal electors			
No.	Name	CB	CP	CD	Total	CB	CP	CD	Total
264	John Paul II (1978–2005)	5	33	0	38	0	4	0	4
265	Benedict XVI (2005–2013)	4	53	0	57	1	16	0	17
266	Francis (2013–2025)	3	109	32	144	2	78	15	95
Total		12	195	32	239	3	98	15	116

=== Cardinals by particular church sui iuris ===
While most cardinals belong to the Latin Church, which encompasses the vast majority of Catholics, a small number of cardinals belong to one of the twenty-three autonomous (sui iuris) Eastern Catholic Churches. At present, there are seven Eastern Catholic cardinals, including five cardinal electors, belonging to six particular churches sui iuris:

- Bechara Boutros al-Rahi (Maronite Church)
- Louis Raphaël I Sako (Chaldean Church), cardinal elector
- George Alencherry (Syro-Malabar Church)
- Baselios Cleemis (Syro-Malankara Church), cardinal elector
- Berhaneyesus Demerew Souraphiel (Ethiopian Church), cardinal elector
- Mykola Bychok (Ukrainian Church), cardinal elector
- George Koovakad (Syro-Malabar Church), cardinal elector

Particular church sui iuris		All cardinals	Cardinal electors
Latin Church (Western)		232	111
Eastern Churches	Chaldean Church	1	1
Eastern Churches	Ethiopian Church	1	1
Eastern Churches	Maronite Church	1	0
Eastern Churches	Syro-Malabar Church	2	1
Eastern Churches	Syro-Malankara Church	1	1
Eastern Churches	Ukrainian Church	1	1
Eastern Churches	Subtotal	7	5
Total		239	116

=== Cardinals by institute of consecrated life or society of apostolic life ===
At present, there are 63 cardinals, including 31 cardinal electors, who are members of the religious life, representing 27 institutes of consecrated life and societies of apostolic life. In this table, the common name for the members of an institute or society, if different from its formal name, is given in brackets.

Post-nominal	Institute or society	All cardinals	Cardinal electors
CJM	Congregation of Jesus and Mary (Eudists)	1	0
CM	Congregation of the Mission (Vincentians, Lazarists)	3	2
CMF	Congregation of Missionary Sons of the Immaculate Heart of the Blessed Virgin Mary (Claretians)	2	0
CS	Congregation of the Missionaries of Saint Charles Borromeo (Scalabrinians)	2	1
CSC	Congregation of Holy Cross (Holy Cross Fathers)	1	0
CSSp	Congregation of the Holy Spirit (Holy Ghost Fathers, Spiritans)	2	1
CSsR	Congregation of the Most Holy Redeemer (Redemptorists)	2	2
IMC	Institute of Consolata Missionaries	1	1
ISch	Institute of Schönstatt Fathers	1	0
ISPX	Pius X Secular Institute	1	1
IVD	Voluntas Dei Institute	1	0
LC	Congregation of the Legionaries of Christ	1	0
MAfr	Missionaries of Africa (White Fathers)	1	0
MSC	Missionaries of the Sacred Heart	1	1
OAR	Order of Augustinian Recollects	1	0
OCD	Order of Discalced Carmelites	1	1
OCist	Order of Cistercians	1	1
OFM	Order of Friars Minor (Franciscans)	5	4
OFMCap	Order of Friars Minor Capuchin (Capuchins)	4	1
OFMConv	Order of Friars Minor Conventual (Conventual Franciscans)	3	3
OMI	Missionary Oblates of Mary Immaculate (Oblates)	1	0
OMM	Mariamite Maronite Order (Aleppians)	1	0
OP	Order of Preachers (Dominicans)	4	2
PSS	Society of the Priests of Saint Sulpice (Sulpicians)	1	0
SDB	Society of Saint Francis de Sales (Salesians)	10	5
SJ	Society of Jesus (Jesuits)	9	3
SVD	Society of the Divine Word (Verbites)	2	2
None	Secular clergy	176	85
Total		239	116

=== Cardinals by continent ===
For the purposes of this article, countries are grouped into continents generally according to the regions of the United Nations geoscheme; for the region of the Americas, North America comprises the subregions of Northern America, Central America and the Caribbean, while South America comprises the remaining subregion of the same name. The statistics for the global distribution of Catholics in the table below are sourced from the 2024 edition of the Annuarium Statisticum Ecclesiae (Statistical Yearbook of the Church), published in 2026.

Continent	All cardinals		Cardinal electors		Percentage of global Catholic population (2024)
Continent	Number	Percentage	Number	Percentage	Percentage of global Catholic population (2024)
Africa	27	11.3%	14	12.1%	20.3%
North America	35	14.6%	18	15.5%	20.3%
South America	30	12.6%	17	14.7%	27.4%
Asia	36	15.1%	22	19.0%	11.0%
Europe	107	44.8%	41	35.3%	20.1%
Oceania	4	1.7%	4	3.4%	0.9%
Total	239	100.0%	116	100.0%	100.0%

=== Cardinals by country ===
At present, 91 countries are represented in the College of Cardinals, including 66 with at least one cardinal elector. The countries with the greatest numbers of cardinals are Italy (48), the United States (16), and Spain (13). Among the cardinal electors, the countries with the greatest numbers are Italy (14), the United States (9), and Brazil (7).

Country	Continent	All cardinals	Cardinal electors
Albania	Europe	1	0
Algeria	Africa	1	1
Argentina	South America	6	4
Australia	Oceania	1	1
Austria	Europe	1	0
Bangladesh	Asia	1	0
Belgium	Europe	1	1
Bolivia	South America	1	0
Bosnia and Herzegovina	Europe	1	0
Brazil	South America	8	7
Burkina Faso	Africa	1	0
Canada	North America	5	3
Cape Verde	Africa	1	1
Central African Republic	Africa	1	1
Chile	South America	4	1
Colombia	South America	3	1
Democratic Republic of the Congo	Africa	1	1
Croatia	Europe	1	1
Cuba	North America	1	1
Dominican Republic	North America	1	0
East Timor	Asia	1	1
Ecuador	South America	1	1
El Salvador	North America	1	0
Ethiopia	Africa	1	1
France	Europe	7	4
Germany	Europe	6	3
Ghana	Africa	1	1
Guatemala	North America	1	1
Guinea	Africa	1	0
Haiti	North America	1	1
Honduras	North America	1	0
Hong Kong	Asia	3	1
Hungary	Europe	1	1
India	Asia	6	4
Indonesia	Asia	2	1
Iran	Asia	1	1
Iraq	Asia	1	1
Ireland	Europe	1	0
Italy	Europe	48	14
Ivory Coast	Africa	2	1
Japan	Asia	2	2
Jerusalem	Asia	1	1
Kenya	Africa	1	0
South Korea	Asia	2	1
Laos	Asia	1	0
Latvia	Europe	1	0
Lebanon	Asia	1	0
Lithuania	Europe	3	1
Luxembourg	Europe	1	1
Madagascar	Africa	1	1
Malaysia	Asia	1	1
Mali	Africa	1	0
Malta	Europe	1	1
Mauritius	Africa	1	0
Mexico	North America	6	2
Mongolia	Asia	1	1
Morocco	Africa	1	1
Myanmar	Asia	1	1
Netherlands	Europe	1	1
New Zealand	Oceania	1	1
Nicaragua	North America	1	1
Nigeria	Africa	4	1
Pakistan	Asia	1	0
Panama	North America	1	0
Papua New Guinea	Oceania	1	1
Paraguay	South America	1	1
Peru	South America	3	1
Philippines	Asia	5	3
Poland	Europe	5	3
Portugal	Europe	6	4
Rwanda	Africa	1	1
Senegal	Africa	1	0
Serbia	Europe	1	1
Singapore	Asia	1	1
Slovenia	Europe	1	0
South Africa	Africa	2	1
South Sudan	Africa	1	1
Spain	Europe	13	2
Sri Lanka	Asia	1	1
Sudan	Africa	1	0
Sweden	Europe	1	1
Switzerland	Europe	1	1
Tanzania	Africa	1	1
Thailand	Asia	2	1
Tonga	Oceania	1	1
Uganda	Africa	1	0
United Kingdom	Europe	4	1
United States	North America	16	9
Uruguay	South America	1	1
Venezuela	South America	2	0
Vietnam	Asia	1	0
Total		239	116

== See also ==
- Cardinals created by John Paul II
- Cardinals created by Benedict XVI
- Cardinals created by Francis
- Cardinal electors in the 2025 conclave
- Council of Cardinals
- List of creations of cardinals
- Suburbicarian diocese
- Titular church (List of titular churches)
