= Francesco Colasuonno =

Italian prelate

His Eminence Francesco Colasuonno
- Cardinal-Deacon of Sant'Eugenio
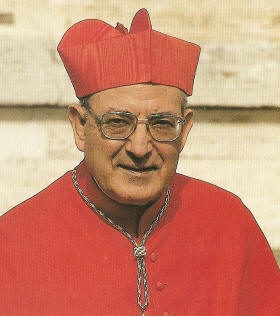
- Church: Roman Catholic Church
- Appointed: 21 February 1998
- Installed: 29 November 1998
- Term ended: 31 May 2003
- Predecessor: Paul Poupard
- Successor: Julián Herranz Casado
- Previous posts: Chargé d'affaires to China (1972–74); Apostolic Delegate to Mozambique (1974–85); Titular Archbishop of Tronto (1974–98); Apostolic Pro-Nuncio to Zimbabwe (1981–85); Apostolic Pro-Nuncio to Yugoslavia (1985–86); Delegation Chief to Poland (1986–90); Apostolic Nuncio to the Russian Federation (1990–94); Apostolic Nuncio to Italy (1994–98); Apostolic Nuncio to San Marino (1995–98)

Orders
- Ordination: 28 September 1947 by Marcello Mimmi
- Consecration: 9 February 1975 by Corrado Ursi
- Created cardinal: 21 February 1998 by Pope John Paul II
- Rank: Cardinal-deacon

Personal details
- Born: Francesco Colasuonno; 2 January 1925 Grumo Appula, Bari, Kingdom of Italy
- Died: 31 May 2003 (aged 78) Grumo Appula, Bari, Italy
- Denomination: Catholic (Roman Rite)
- Education: University of Bari; Pontifical Gregorian University; Pontifical Ecclesiastical Academy
- Motto: Laetus serviam

Francesco Colasuonno (2 January 1925 – 31 May 2003) was an Italian prelate of the Catholic Church who served as a Vatican diplomat for more than two decades. He had the personal title of archbishop and at the end of his service became a cardinal.

== Biography ==
Colasuonno was born in Grumo Appula, Bari, Italy. He was ordained a priest in 1947 and then taught for more than a decade in the seminary in Bari while earning doctorates in theology and canon law.

He served in the office of the Holy See's Secretariat of State beginning in 1958 and then in the Vatican diplomatic corps. After working in the United States from 1962 to 1967 and then in India and Republic of China (also known as Taiwan nowadays), his assignments included apostolic delegate to Mozambique from 1974 to 1981; pro-nuncio to Zimbabwe from 1981 to 1985; pro-nuncio to Yugoslavia from 1985 to 1986; papal envoy for Eastern Europe from 1986 to 1990; nuncio to the Soviet Union (and its successor, the Russian Federation) from 1990 to 1994, and nuncio to Italy from 1994 to 1998.He was the first Apostolic Delegate to Mozambique and the first papal nuncio to the Soviet Union. His work in Eastern Europe coincided with the special interest the Vatican took in the region under John Paul II and the breakup of the Soviet Union and the Warsaw Pact. Much of his work involved locating communities of Catholics that had survived under communism and in persuading governments to permit the Vatican to reestablish churches and especially to appoint bishops. After years of negotiation, he consecrated three bishops in Czechoslovakia in 1988. To locate Catholics in Vladivostok, he walked around the city in his cassock to make himself known.

He was named Titular Archbishop of Truentum in 1975 and consecrated in February. Pope John Paul II made him a cardinal at a consistory on 21 February 1998. He retired that year.

He died in his birthplace, Grumo Appula, on 31 May 2003. He was entombed in the Church of Santa Maria Assunta in Bari.
