= Gabriel-Marie Garrone =

French Catholic prelate

His Eminence Gabriel-Marie Garrone
- President Emeritus of the Pontifical Council for Culture
- Church: Roman Catholic Church
- Appointed: 20 May 1982
- Term ended: 19 April 1988
- Successor: Paul Poupard
- Other post: Cardinal-Priest of Santa Sabina (1967–94)
- Previous posts: Titular Archbishop of Lemnus (1947–56); Coadjutor Archbishop of Toulouse (1947–56); Archbishop of Toulouse (1956–66); Pro-Prefect of the Congregation for Catholic Education (1966–68); Titular Archbishop of Turres in Numidia (1966–67); Prefect of the Congregation for Catholic Education (1968–80); Camerlengo of the College of Cardinals (1978–79)

Orders
- Ordination: 11 April 1925
- Consecration: 24 June 1947 by Emile Maurice Guerry
- Created cardinal: 26 June 1967 by Pope Paul VI
- Rank: Cardinal-Priest

Personal details
- Born: Gabriel-Marie Garrone; 12 October 1901 Aix-les-Bains, France
- Died: 15 January 1994 (aged 92) Rome, Italy
- Education: Pontifical Gregorian University
- Motto: Omne bonum a Patre
- Coat of arms

Styles of Gabriel-Marie Garrone
- Reference style: His Eminence
- Spoken style: Your Eminence
- Informal style: Cardinal
- See: Torri di Numidia (titular see)

Gabriel-Marie Garrone (12 October 1901 – 15 January 1994) was a French Catholic prelate who served as president of the Pontifical Council for Culture from 1982 to 1988. He previously served as prefect of the Congregation for Catholic Education from 1968 to 1980. He was named a cardinal by Pope Paul VI in 1967.

== Biography ==
Garrone was born in Aix-les-Bains, France. He entered the seminary and was educated at the Pontifical Gregorian University in Rome and later, at the Pontifical French Seminary also in Rome.

He was ordained on 11 April 1925 and served as a faculty member of the Minor Seminary of Chambéry until 1926 when he was a faculty member of the Major Seminary until 1939. He did pastoral work in the archdiocese of Chambéry during these years also. He was an officer in the French Army during World War II and a prisoner of war. After the war he was the rector of the Major Seminary of Chambéry until 1947.

=== Episcopate ===
Pope Pius XII appointed him titular archbishop of Lemnos and coadjutor bishop of Toulouse on 24 April 1947. He was consecrated exactly two months later. He succeeded to the metropolitan see of Toulouse on 5 November 1956. He attended the Second Vatican Council in Rome from 1962 until 1965. He was appointed Pro-Prefect of the Prefect of the Congregation of Seminaries and Universities by Pope Paul VI on 28 January 1966. He was transferred to the titular see of Torri di Numidia on 24 March 1966.

==== Cardinalate ====
He was created and proclaimed Cardinal-Priest of Santa Sabina in the consistory of 26 June 1967. Pope Paul named him full Prefect of the Congregation for Catholic Education and grand chancellor of the Pontifical Gregorian University on 17 January 1968. He took part in the conclaves that elected Pope John Paul I and Pope John Paul II in August and October. He resigned the prefecture on 15 January 1980. He lost the right to participate in any future conclaves when he turned 80 years of age in 1981. He was appointed as the first President of the newly established Pontifical Council for Culture on 20 May 1982. He resigned the presidency in 1988. He died in 1994 and was buried temporarily at the Campo Verano, Rome, awaiting completion of his definitive tomb in the church of San Luigi dei Francesi.

Catholic Church titles
Preceded by Giuseppe Pizzardo	Prefect of the Congregation for Catholic Education; 17 January 1968 – 15 January 1980	Succeeded by William Wakefield Baum
Preceded by none, newly established	President of the Pontifical Council for Culture; 20 May 1982 – 19 April 1988	Succeeded by Paul Poupard
