= Paul Poupard =

French prelate of the Catholic Church (born 1930)

His Eminence Paul Poupard
- Cardinal; President Emeritus of the Pontifical Council for Culture
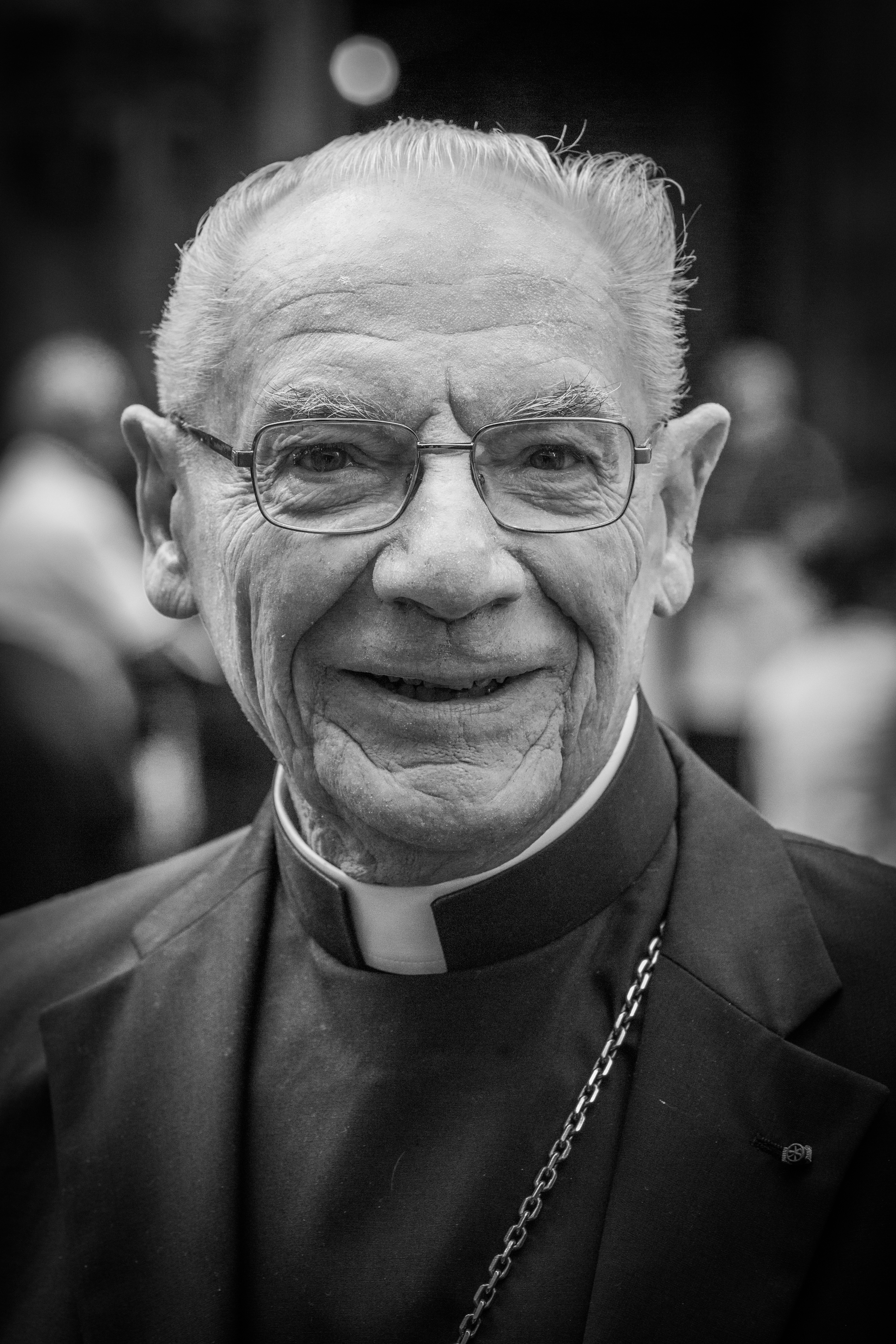
- Poupard in 2015
- Church: Catholic Church
- Appointed: 19 April 1988
- Term ended: 3 September 2007
- Predecessor: Gabriel-Marie Garrone
- Successor: Gianfranco Ravasi
- Other post: Cardinal-Priest of Santa Prassede (1996–)
- Previous posts: Titular Bishop of Usula (1979–80); Auxiliary Bishop of Paris (1979–80); Titular Archbishop of Usula (1980–85); Pro-President of the Secretariat for Non-Believers (1980–85); Cardinal-Deacon of Sant'Eugenio (1985–96); President of the Secretariat for Non-Believers (1985–88); President of the Pontifical Council for Dialogue with Non-Believers (1988–93); President of the Pontifical Council for Interreligious Dialogue (2006–07); President of the Commission for Religious Relations with Muslims (2006–07)

Orders
- Ordination: 18 December 1954 by Stanislas Courbe
- Consecration: 6 April 1979 by Gabriel Auguste François Marty
- Created cardinal: 25 May 1985 by Pope John Paul II
- Rank: Cardinal-Deacon (1985–96); Cardinal-Priest (1996–)

Personal details
- Born: Paul Joseph Jean Poupard; 30 August 1930 (age 96) Bouzillé, France
- Education: Catholic University of the West; École pratique des hautes études
- Motto: Episcopus vobis vobiscum Christianus
- Coat of arms

Styles of Paul Poupard
- Reference style: His Eminence
- Spoken style: Your Eminence
- Religious style: Cardinal
- Informal style: Cardinal
- See: Santa Prassede (titular)

Paul Joseph Jean Poupard (born 30 August 1930) is a French prelate of the Catholic Church who has been a cardinal since 1985. He held positions in the Roman Curia for more than 25 years, serving as President of the Pontifical Council for Culture from 1988 to 2007 and briefly as President of the Pontifical Council for Interreligious Dialogue.

== Biography ==
Poupard was born in Bouzillé, Maine-et-Loire. He studied at the minor seminary in Beaupréau, University of Angers, and École Pratique des Hautes Études of the Sorbonne (from where he obtained his doctorates in theology and history). Poupard was ordained to the priesthood by Bishop Stanislas Courbe on 18 December 1954, and then taught at the Mongazon School. After entering the French section of the Secretariat of State in 1959, he was raised to the rank of Chaplain of His Holiness on 20 March 1965, and of Honorary Prelate of His Holiness on 29 November 1971. Poupard was Rector of the Institut Catholique de Paris from 1972 to 1980, and also served as vice-president of the Society of French Ecclesiastical History.

On 2 February 1979, he was appointed Auxiliary Bishop of Paris and Titular Bishop of Usula. Poupard received his episcopal consecration on the following 6 April from Cardinal François Marty, with Archbishop André Pailler and Bishop Jean Orchampt serving as co-consecrators, in the Church of Saint-Germain-des-Prés. A year and a half later, in 1980, he received a position in the Roman Curia, the Holy See's governing body, as Pro-President of the Secretariat for Non-Believers, later (in 1988) renamed the Pontifical Council for Culture. In 1985, his title was changed to president, on his becoming Cardinal-Deacon of S. Eugenio. After the sede vacante period that followed the death of Pope John Paul II, Pope Benedict XVI reappointed him to the same position and, on 11 March 2006, also named him President of the Pontifical Council for Interreligious Dialogue.

Some of his writings have been translated into languages including Arabic, Bulgarian, Chinese, Croatian, English, German, Hungarian, Italian, Japanese, Korean, Portuguese, Russian, and Spanish. He holds doctorates in theology and history from the Sorbonne, as well as honorary doctorates from the Universities of Aix-en-Provence, Fu Jen, Louvain, Kyoto, Santiago de Chile, Puebla de los Angeles and the Babes-Bolyai University/Cluj-Napoca.

In 1996 he was appointed Cardinal-Priest of Santa Prassede. He was one of the cardinal electors who participated in the 2005 papal conclave that elected Pope Benedict XVI. In September 2007 Pope Benedict replaced him as President of the Pontifical Council for Interreligious Dialogue with Cardinal Jean-Louis Tauran and as President of the Pontifical Council for Culture with Gianfranco Ravasi.

== Bibliography ==
- John XXIII. Simple and Humble, A Blessed Man, 'The Holiness of John XXIII' by His Eminence Paul Cardinal Poupard, President Emeritus of the Pontifical Council for Culture, p. 25 – p. 57, Gunnar Riebs, ST Pauls, 2011, ISBN 978-93-5015-077-1

Catholic Church titles
Preceded by José Vázquez Díaz	— TITULAR — Titular Bishop of Usula; 2 February 1979 – 27 June 1980	Himself as Titular Archbishop
Himself as Titular Bishop	— TITULAR — Titular Archbishop of Usula; 27 June 1980 – 25 May 1985	Succeeded by Giovanni Marra
Preceded by Franz König	President of the Secretariat for Non-Believers; 27 June 1980 – 25 March 1993	Office suppressed
Preceded by Francesco Colasuonno	Cardinal Deacon of Sant'Eugenio; 25 May 1985 – 29 January 1996	Succeeded by Julián Herranz Casado
Preceded by Gabriel-Marie Garrone	President of the Pontifical Council for Culture; 19 April 1988 – 3 September 2007	Succeeded by Gianfranco Ravasi
Preceded by Owen McCann	Cardinal Priest of Santa Prassede; 29 January 1996 –	Incumbent
Preceded by Michael Louis Fitzgerald	President of the Pontifical Council for Interreligious Dialogue; 11 March 2006 – 1 September 2007	Succeeded by Jean-Louis Tauran
Preceded by Michael Louis Fitzgerald	President of the Commission for Religious Relations with Muslims; 11 March 2006 – 1 September 2007	Succeeded by Jean-Louis Tauran
