= Sant'Eugenio =

Roman Catholic basilica, a landmark of Rome, Italy

- Basilica of Saint Eugene
- Basilica di Sant'Eugenio
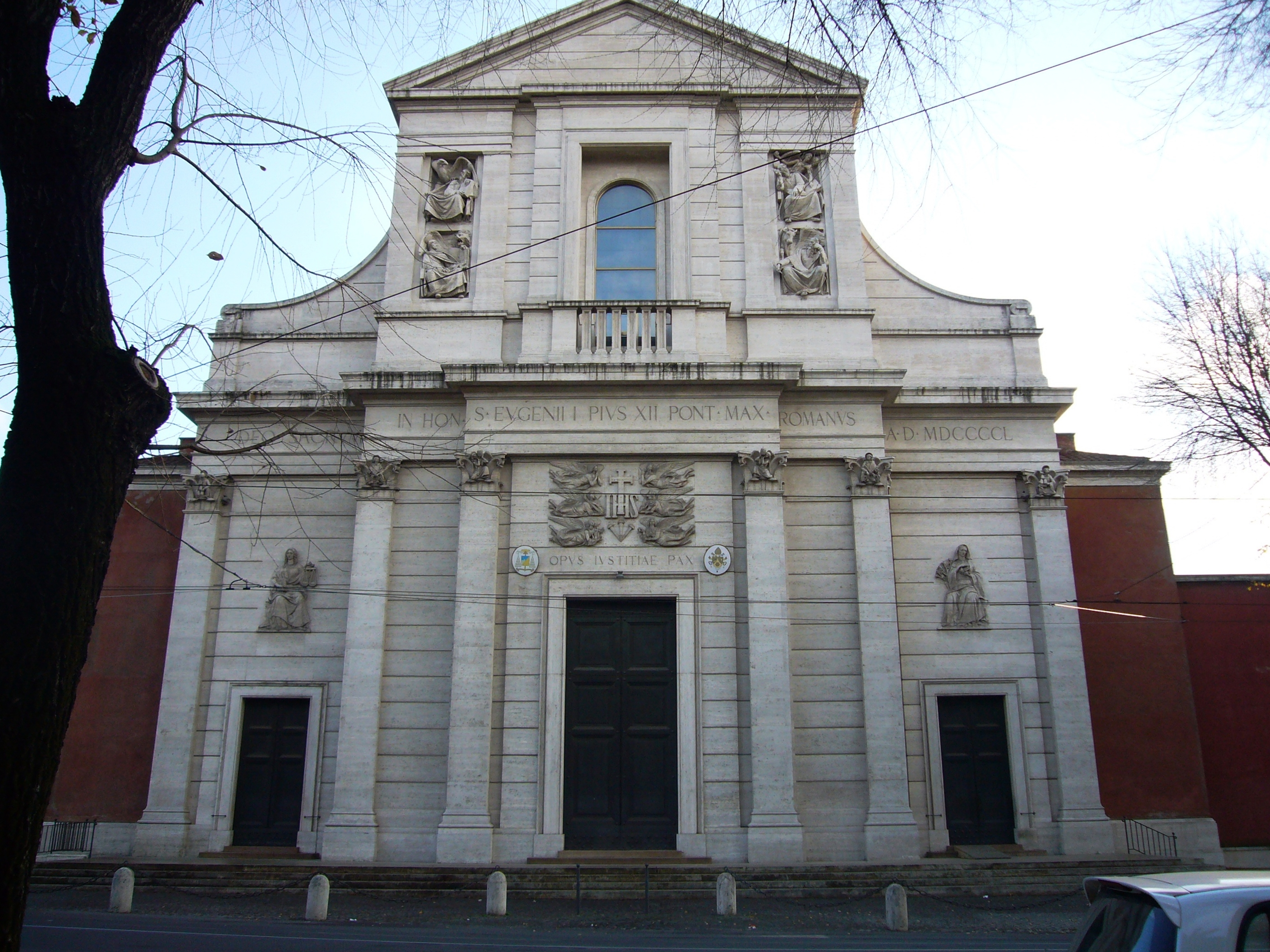
- Quartiere Pinciano: Sant'Eugenio
- Click on the map for a fullscreen view
- 41°55′7.34″N 12°28′29.1″E
- Location: Viale delle Belle Arti 10, Rome
- Country: Italy
- Language: Italian
- Denomination: Catholic
- Tradition: Roman Rite
- Website: parrocchiasanteugenio.it

History
- Status: titular church, minor basilica
- Founded: 1942
- Founder: Pope Pius XII
- Dedication: Pope Eugene I
- Consecrated: 2 June 1951

Architecture
- Architect: Enrico Pietro Galeazzi
- Architectural type: Modern Baroque

Administration
- Diocese: Rome

Sant'Eugenio [santeuˈdʒɛːnjo] is a titular church in Rome, Italy, dedicated to Pope Eugene I (r. AD 654–657).

== History ==
The first church here was built in a style imitating and updating the Baroque, sometimes called 'Mussolini Baroque'. The church was established by Pope Pius XII, in honor of his patron saint (his baptismal name was Eugenio Pacelli), and was funded by gifts he received on the Silver Jubilee of his episcopate in 1942. He consecrated its altar in 1951.

A residence college for young men studying for the priesthood at the Roman universities is annexed to the church.

The frescoes inside include The Triumph of the Cross above the altar (which includes an image of Pius), and others in the chapels of Our Lady of Fatima and of Saints Peter and Paul.

The church is being staffed by the Prelature of Opus Dei. The church is also regarded as a parish of the Prelature of Opus Dei.

== Deaconry ==
The church of S. Eugenio was established as a Deaconry for a Cardinal Deacon by Pope John XXIII on 12 March 1960. The following have been Cardinal Deacons of S. Eugenio:

- Antonio Bacci (31 Mar 1960 – 20 Jan 1971)
- Umberto Mozzoni (5 Mar 1973 – 7 Nov 1983)
- Paul Joseph Jean Poupard (25 May 1985 – 29 Jan 1996). Appointed, Cardinal-Priest of Santa Prassede.
- Francesco Colasuonno (21 Feb 1998 – 31 May 2003)
- Julián Herranz Casado (21 Oct 2003 → )

== Bibliography ==
- Martin Bräuer, Handbuch der Kardinäle: 1846-2012 (Berlin/Boston: Walter de Gruyter GmbH & Co KG, 2014).

Preceded by Santa Croce in Gerusalemme	Landmarks of Rome; Sant'Eugenio	Succeeded by Sant'Eustachio
