= San Tommaso Apostolo =

- Church of Saint Thomas the Apostle
- Chiesa di San Tommaso Apostolo ad Infernetto
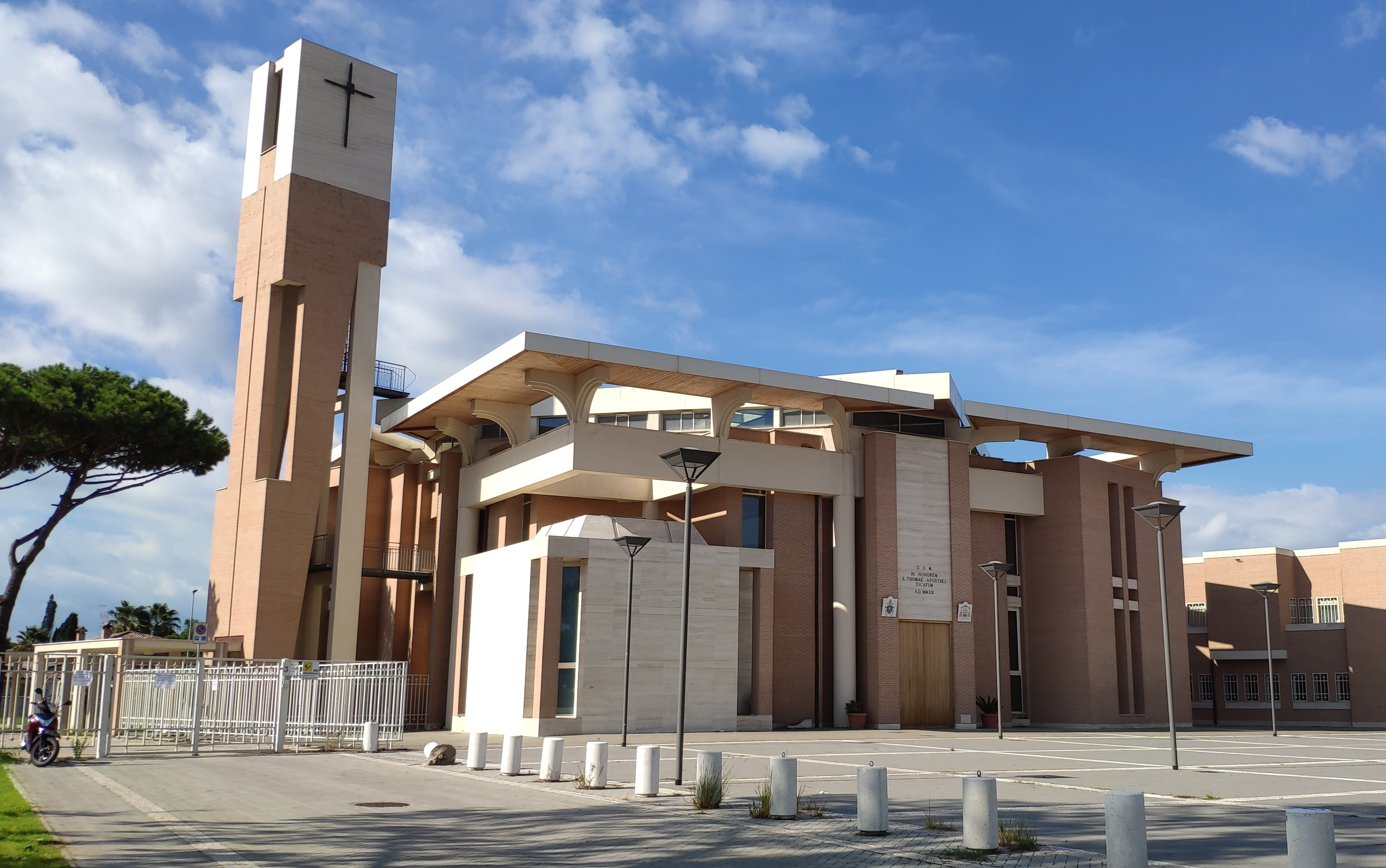
- Click on the map for a fullscreen view
- 41°44′17″N 12°22′19″E
- Location: Via Lino Liviabella 70, Rome
- Country: Italy
- Language: Italian
- Denomination: Catholic
- Tradition: Roman Rite
- Website: santommasoapostolo.com

History
- Status: titular church
- Founded: 2010
- Dedication: Thomas the Apostle
- Consecrated: 2013

Architecture
- Architect: Marco Petreschi
- Architectural type: Modern
- Completed: 2012

Administration
- Diocese: Rome

The Church of San Tommaso Apostolo is a titular church in the Roman Catholic church for Cardinal-priests.

== Church ==
It was built as a parish church for the parish of St. Thomas, established on 19 February 1964 in the XXVIIth prefecture of southern Rome, in the papal diocese. The church was dedicated to Saint Thomas the Apostle on 13 February 2013. Its address is Via A. Mariani, in Infernetto in Rome.

It enjoyed papal visits by Pope John Paul II on 13 December 1989, and by Pope Francis on 16 February 2014.

== Cardinal-protectors ==
The title was established on 14 February 2015.

It has been held by the following Cardinal-priests :

- (Vietnamese) Peter Nguyễn Văn Nhơn (14 February 2015 – ...), while Metropolitan Archbishop of Roman Catholic Archdiocese of Hanoi (13 May 2010 – 17 November 2018); previously Coadjutor Bishop of Đà Lat (Vietnam) (11 October 1991– 23 March 1994) succeeding as Bishop of Đà Lat ( 23 March 1994– 22 April 2010), President of Episcopal Conference of Vietnam (2007 – 2013), Coadjutor Archbishop of Hà Nôi (22 April 2010– 13 May 2010).
