= Fortunato Frezza =

Italian priest (born 1942)

His Eminence Fortunato Frezza
- Canon of St. Peter's Basilica; Master of Ceremonies of the Order of the Holy Sepulchre
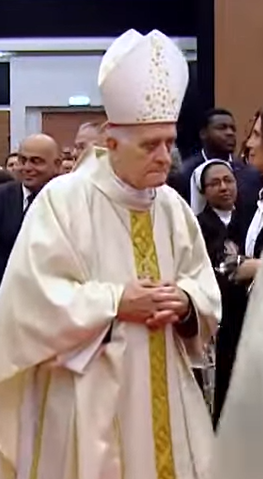
- Cardinal Frezza, 2024
- Church: Roman Catholic Church
- Appointed: 29 September 2013
- Other post: Cardinal-Deacon of Santa Maria in Via Lata (2022-)
- Previous posts: Under-Secretary of the Synod of Bishops (1997–2014); Titular Archbishop of Treba (2022)

Orders
- Ordination: 28 June 1966 by Luigi Rosa
- Consecration: 23 July 2022 by Mauro Gambetti
- Created cardinal: 27 August 2022 by Pope Francis
- Rank: Cardinal-Deacon

Personal details
- Born: Fortunato Frezza; 6 February 1942 (age 84) Montecalvello, Italy
- Motto: Loquendo Scripturas aperiens
- Coat of arms

Styles of Fortunato Frezza
- Reference style: His Eminence
- Spoken style: Your Eminence
- Religious style: Cardinal
- Informal style: Cardinal

Fortunato Frezza (born 6 February 1942) is an Italian prelate of the Catholic Church who devoted his career to Biblical scholarship and teaching. He has been a canon of St. Peter's Basilica since 2013.

Pope Francis made him a cardinal on 27 August 2022.

== Biography ==
Fortunato Frezza was born in the Montecalvello neighborhood of Viterbo on 6 February 1942. He studied at the minor seminary of Bagnoregio and the major seminary of Viterbo. On 28 June 1966 he was ordained a priest of the Diocese of Bagnoregio by Bishop Luigi Rosa of Bagnoregio. He obtained a licentiate in theology from the Pontifical Gregorian University in 1967 and a degree in sacred scripture from the Pontifical Biblical Institute in Rome in 1977 with a thesis on the book of the prophet Micah.

From 1971 to 1984 he was parish priest of Sipicciano. During those years he also taught of sacred scripture in various places: as an assistant at the Pontifical Gregorian University; at La Quercia Viterbo Regional Seminary; at institutes of religious studies im Albano, Civita Castellana, and Viterbo; at the theological schools of the Congregation of St. Joseph in Viterbo and of the Salesians in the Holy Land.

In 1983 he joined the staff of the General Secretariat of the Synod of Bishops and on 23 June 1997 he was named its under-secretary by Pope John Paul II. On 13 December 2011 Pope Benedict XVI confirmed his appointment as under-secretary until his 72nd birthday.

In September 2013, Pope Francis appointed him a canon of St. Peter's Basilica and he was invested on 29 September; in 2022 he became Camerlengo of the Chapter of St. Peter in the Vatican. He has also held chaplaincies for Directorate of Health and Hygiene in the Vatican, for various monasteries of nuns, and for the football team A.S. Roma. He has authored numerous scholarly articles, especially in Biblical studies.

He has been Master of Ceremonies and Spiritual Assistant of the Order of the Holy Sepulchre since 2015.

He received his episcopal consecration on 23 July 2022 from Cardinal Mauro Gambetti, becoming titular archbishop of Treba.

On 27 August 2022, Pope Francis made him a Cardinal-Deacon, assigning him the deaconry Santa Maria in Via Lata.

== See also ==
- Cardinals created by Pope Francis
