= Francesco Coccopalmerio =

Italian cardinal

His Eminence Francesco Coccopalmerio
- President Emeritus of the Pontifical Council for Legislative Texts
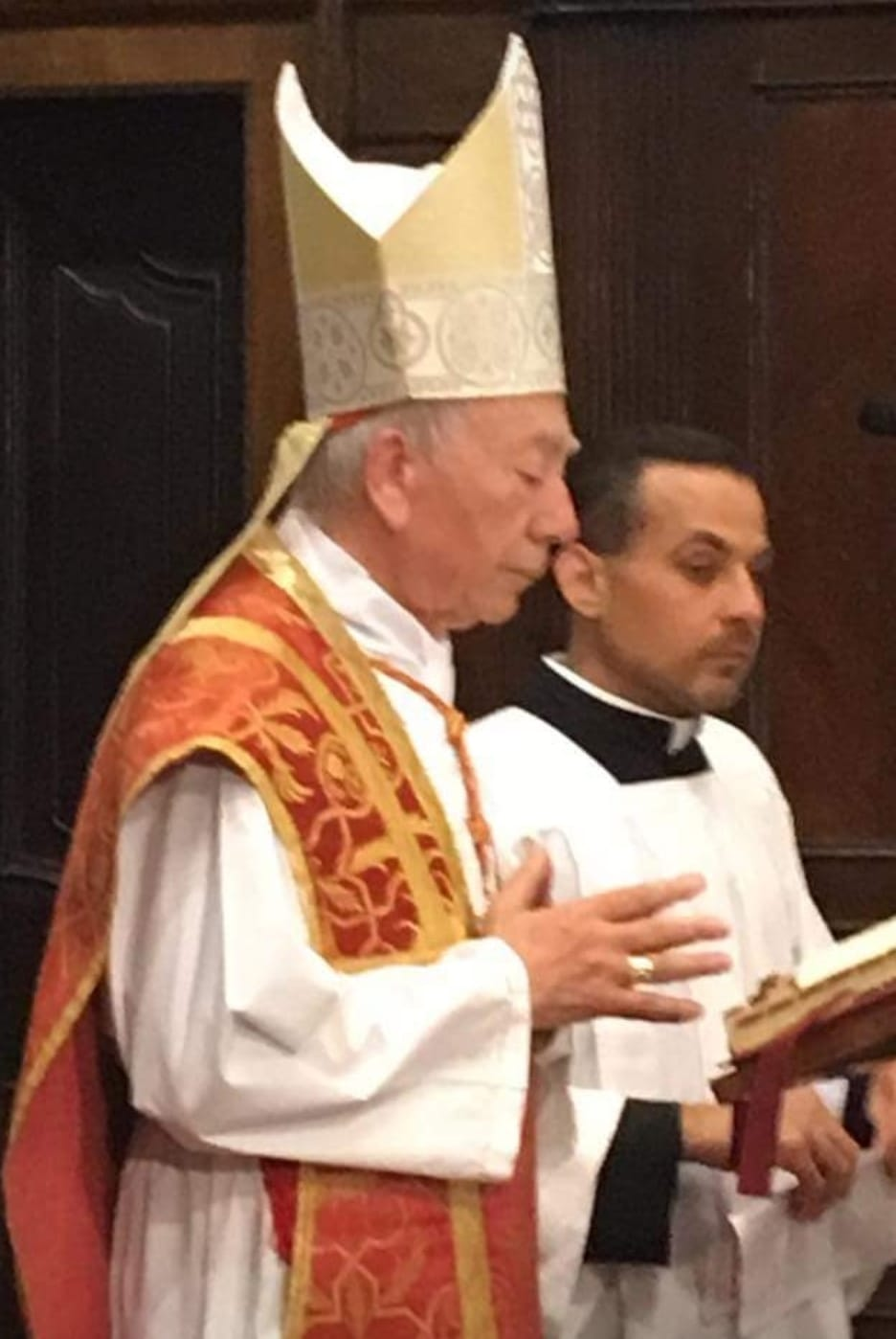
- Coccopalmerio (left) on 4 August 2002
- Church: Roman Catholic Church
- Appointed: 15 February 2007
- Term ended: 7 April 2018
- Predecessor: Julián Herranz Casado
- Successor: Filippo Iannone
- Other post: Cardinal priest of San Giuseppe dei Falegnami (2022–present)
- Previous posts: Auxiliary Bishop of Milan (1993–2007); Titular Bishop of Coeliana (1993–2007); Titular Archbishop of Coeliana (2007–12)

Orders
- Ordination: 28 June 1962 by Pope Paul VI
- Consecration: 22 May 1993 by Carlo Maria Martini
- Created cardinal: 18 February 2012 by Pope Benedict XVI
- Rank: Cardinal deacon (2012–22); Cardinal priest (2022–present)

Personal details
- Born: Francesco Coccopalmerio; 6 March 1938 (age 88) San Giuliano Milanese, Kingdom of Italy
- Motto: Justus Ut Palma Florebit
- Coat of arms

Styles of Francesco Coccopalmerio
- Reference style: His Eminence
- Spoken style: Your Emience
- Religious style: Monsignor
- Posthumous style: not applicable
- Informal style: Cardinal

Francesco Coccopalmerio (born 6 March 1938) is an Italian cardinal. He was president of the Pontifical Council for Legislative Texts from his appointment by Pope Benedict XVI on 15 February 2007 until his resignation was accepted by Pope Francis on 7 April 2018. He spent his early years in the Archdiocese of Milan and became an auxiliary bishop in 1993. He moved to the Roman Curia in 2000.

== Biography ==
=== Early life ===
Coccopalmerio was born in San Giuliano Milanese, Italy, where his parents were living during World War II, on 6 March 1938 and raised in Sernio, his mother's home town. He was ordained a priest on 28 June 1962 by Giovanni Montini (later Pope Paul VI), then the archbishop of Milan. He received a licentiate in theology in 1963. He received a doctorate in canon law from the Pontifical Gregorian University in 1968. In 1976 he obtained a doctorate in law at the Università Cattolica del Sacro Cuore in Milan.

=== Archdiocese of Milan ===
He held positions in the archdiocese of Milan until 1994. He was professor of canon law at the Faculty of Theology in northern Italy from 1966 to 1999. Since 1981, he has been a professor of canon law at the Pontifical Gregorian University.

On 10 April 1993, Pope John Paul II appointed Coccopalmerio an auxiliary bishop of Milan with the titular see of Coeliana. He was consecrated bishop on 22 May of that year. Within the Italian Episcopal Conference, he is one of the leading voices on legal issues and ecumenical and inter-religious dialogue. Since 2000, Coccopalmerio has been a member of the Supreme Tribunal of the Apostolic Signatura.

=== Pontifical Council for Legislative Texts ===
On 15 February 2007, he was given the personal title of archbishop and appointed president of the Pontifical Council for Legislative Texts. Since 2008, at the direction of Pope Benedict, one of his principal responsibilities has been the revision to procedures for handling clergy sex abuse and the applicable punishments. In 2014, he explained: "We want to make this delicate material more accessible, more understandable and easier for bishops to apply." At issue is "Book VI: Sanctions in the Church".

Coccopalmerio was reported to have been one of the senior prelates who, in preparing to announce the lifting of the excommunications of four leaders of the Society of Saint Pius X in January 2009, failed to take account of recent reports that one of them, Bishop Richard Williamson, was a Holocaust denier.

He was appointed a five-year renewable term as a member of the Congregation for the Doctrine of the Faith on 23 December 2010.

On 18 February 2012, Pope Benedict XVI created him cardinal-deacon of San Giuseppe dei Falegnami. On 21 April 2012, Cardinal Coccopalmerio was named a member of the Congregation for the Doctrine of the Faith, the Apostolic Signatura, and the Pontifical Council for Promoting Christian Unity. On 22 December 2012, he was appointed a member of the Congregation for the Causes of Saints.

At the Synod of Bishops on New Evangelization in October 2012, Coccopalmerio argued that ecumenical efforts to further unify Christians across sectarian lines could play a pivotal role in countering the ongoing "de-Christianization" of Europe by presenting "an extraordinary sign to Islam" of Christian solidarity.

=== 2013 Papal Conclave ===
In the meetings of cardinals that preceded the papal conclave of March 2013, Cardinal Coccopalmerio proposed to create a moderator of the Curia, a prelate who would identify inconsistencies and devise methods of ensuring consistency among departments of the Roman Curia that sometimes contradict one another. The idea was widely appreciated by some cardinals but some were wary that such an appointment would act as a "vice-pope" that would effectively set Vatican and Curial policy or duplicate the already considerable authority of the Substitute in the Secretariate of State, who already fills the role of the Pope's "chief of staff".

In advance of that conclave, he said: "It's time to look outside Italy and Europe, in particular considering Latin America." He was one of the cardinal electors who participated in the 2013 papal conclave that elected Pope Francis, and was mentioned in the Italian press as a possible pope. According to one report, he received more votes in the conclave than any other Italian cardinal because of his proposal for reform of the Roman Curia.

=== Synod on the Family ===
On 27 August 2014, Pope Francis named him to a working group tasked with speeding up the process for assessing the nullity of a marriage. Its work resulted in changes implemented by Francis in September 2015, which eliminated obligatory appeals, eased the dismissal of appeals in certain instances, and instituted a shorter process in some cases. (Note: At a press conference discussing the question of nullity, Coccopalmerio mentioned other issues that remained to be addressed: "Take one case, among the more simple ones: In legislations where homosexual couples can adopt, how should one proceed if a homosexual couple wants a child baptized? How does one, for example, register the baptism?")

Following the first session of the Synod on the Family held in October 2014, he expressed disappointment that not all the participants addressed the pastoral needs of those "who are suffering through problems connected to their relationships" and instead "showed that they simply wanted to reaffirm the doctrine". He provided an example:

We have both doctrine and people to consider. Let's consider a very problematic topic, extremely current: the topic of homosexual couples. If I meet a same-sex couple, I observe right away that their relationship is illicit: That is what the doctrine says, and I reaffirm that with absolute certainty. Nevertheless, if I stop at doctrine, I don't see the people anymore. But if I observe that two people really do love each other, say they practice charity towards the needy...then I can also say that, while their relation remains illicit, in those two people there emerge positive elements. Instead of closing my eyes to those positive aspects, I want to underline them. It is a matter of being objective and recognizing, objectively, the positive points in a given relationship, that is illicit in itself.

He also endorsed the idea of access to the Eucharist for some Catholics in irregular marital situations. He offered the example of a woman who lives with a man who has three small children by a wife who abandoned him. He imagined her coming to Communion "during her father’s funeral Mass, or the day of one of the children’s confirmation". Fearing the consequences of asking her to abandon the man and the children, he asked: "So would it really be totally impossible to admit her to communion? In admitting her to communion, would I be going against the doctrine of the indissolubility of marriage? I really don’t think so: In fact, this has to do with a case of exception."

=== Roman Curia work under Pope Francis ===
In January 2015, Pope Francis named Coccopalmerio to a new board of review within the Congregation for the Doctrine of the Faith that reviews appeals from clergy found guilty of sexual abuse of minors.

In 2015, Cardinal Coccopalmerio questioned the scope of the authority given to the Secretariat for the Economy and its prefect Cardinal Pell. These questions involved not the demand for transparency in all financial operations, but the consolidation of management under the Secretariat for the Economy.

In 2017, he said provisions of Amoris Laetitia allow people in irregular marriage access to the sacraments only if they recognize their situation is sinful and desire to change it. The fact that such a couple also believes changing the situation immediately by splitting would cause more harm and forgoing sexual relations would threaten their current relationship does not rule out the possibility of receiving sacramental absolution and Communion.

=== Resignation ===
A month after Coccopalmerio's 80th birthday, Pope Francis accepted his resignation and named Filippo Iannone to succeed him.

On 4 March 2022, he was elevated to the rank of cardinal priest.

== Affairs and allegations ==
=== The Capozzi affair ===
In June 2017, news surfaced that at some point during the month, Msgr. Luigi Capozzi, the private secretary to Cardinal Coccopalmerio, had been arrested by Vatican Gendarmerie after illegally using cocaine at a gay orgy party at Capozzi's Vatican apartment. Capozzi was afterwards hospitalized at the Roman Pius XI clinic so that he could detox, after which he had a short period of retreat at a nearby monastery and then spent time at the Gemelli Hospital in Rome. Despite the fact that Capozzi resided in the apartment, the apartment was owned by Coccopalmerio.

Prior to the arrest, Coccopalmerio had also recommended having Capozzi appointed as a Bishop. An article dated 24 July 2019 on The Jerusalem Post revealed that following his arrest, Capozzi was ordered to undergo drug rehabilitation therapy and was no longer in the Vatican, but rather a spiritual retreat somewhere in Italy.

=== The Inzoli affair ===
In the October 2018 issue of the German Catholic journal Herder Korrespondenz, Benjamin Leven, a German theologian and editor of the said journal reported that, according to his own sources, it was Cardinal Coccopalmerio who approached the Pope in favor of the child abuser Don Mauro Inzoli in order to have him partially reinstated as priest. Leven also alleged that Coccopalmerio is known in Rome for generally opposing the removal of culprit priests from the priesthood, which for him is akin to the "death penalty".

=== Dialogue with Freemasonry ===
On 16 February 2024, in the premises of the Ambrosianeum cultural foundation in Milan, he participated as a speaker (together with Mario Delpini and Antonio Staglianò) in the conference on the history of relations between the Catholic Church and Freemasonry, organized by the three greater Italian Masonic obediences. Coccopalmerio was the first cardinal to propose the creation of a permanent dialogue table between the Church and Freemasonry.

== Notes ==
Catholic Church titles
Preceded by Herberto Celso Angelo	— TITULAR — Titular Bishop of Cœliana; 8 April 1993 – 15 February 2007	Himself as Titular Archbishop
Himself as Titular Bishop	— TITULAR — Titular Archbishop of Cœliana; 15 February 2007 – 18 February 2012	Succeeded by Paul Robert Sanchez
Preceded by Julián Herranz Casado	President of the Pontifical Council for Legislative Texts; 15 February 2007 – 7 April 2018	Succeeded by Filippo Iannone
Titular church established	Cardinal-Deacon of San Giuseppe dei Falegnami; 18 February 2012 –	Incumbent
