= Julián Herranz Casado =

Spanish Catholic cardinal (born 1930)

His Eminence Julián Herranz Casado
- President emeritus of the Pontifical Council for Legislative Texts
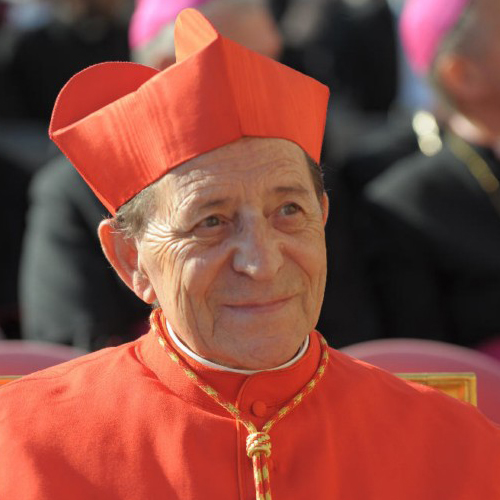
- Cardinal Herranz Casado in 2012
- Appointed: 19 December 1994
- Term ended: 15 February 2007
- Predecessor: Vincenzo Fagiolo
- Successor: Francesco Coccopalmerio
- Other post: Cardinal Priest of Sant'Eugenio (2014–present)
- Previous posts: Secretary of the Pontifical Council for the Interpretation of Legislative Texts (1983–1994); Titular Bishop of Vertara (1990–1994); Titular Archbishop of Vertara (1994–2003); Cardinal Deacon of Sant'Eugenio (2003–2014)

Orders
- Ordination: 7 August 1955 by Juan Ricote Alonso
- Consecration: 6 January 1991 by Pope John Paul II
- Created cardinal: 21 October 2003
- Rank: Cardinal priest

Personal details
- Born: 31 March 1930 (age 96) Baena, Spain
- Denomination: Roman Catholic
- Motto: Domine ut videam (Latin for 'Lord, that I may see'); Luke 18:41

Julián Herranz Casado (born 31 March 1930) is a Spanish cardinal of the Catholic Church. He served as President of the Pontifical Council for the Interpretation of Legislative Texts in the Roman Curia from 1994 to 2007, and was elevated to the cardinalate in 2003 by Pope John Paul II.

He is one of two cardinals – along with Juan Luis Cipriani Thorne – who belong to Opus Dei; Herranz Casado is the organisation's highest-ranking member in the Church's hierarchy. He is also considered one of the foremost experts in canon law, and to have been one of the Vatican's most influential figures during the period shortly before the death of Pope John Paul II.

== Biography ==
Born in Baena in the Province of Córdoba, Herranz Casado joined Opus Dei in 1949 after reading a conspiratorial story about it as editor of a university newspaper. He was ordained as a priest of Opus Dei on 7 August 1955 by Bishop Juan Ricote Alonso, after obtaining doctorates in medicine from the Universities of Barcelona and Navarra and in canon law from the Pontifical University of St. Thomas Aquinas (Angelicum) in Rome. He taught canon law at the University of Navarra and travelled worldwide on behalf of Opus Dei until 1960, when he began to work for the Roman Curia.

During the Second Vatican Council (1962–1965), Herranz Casado served as an assistant of study on the commissions for discipline of clergy and the Christian people. In 1984, he was appointed secretary for the Pontifical Commission for the Authentic Interpretation of the Code of Canon Law, which in 1988 became the Pontifical Council for Legislative Texts. On 15 December 1990, he was appointed titular bishop of Vertara by Pope John Paul II. Herranz Casado received his episcopal consecration on 6 January 1991 from John Paul II, with Archbishops Giovanni Battista Re and Justin Francis Rigali serving as co-consecrators, in St. Peter's Basilica. On 9 December 1994, he was named President of the Pontifical Council for Legislative Texts and raised to the rank of archbishop.

Styles of Julián Herranz Casado
- Reference style: His Eminence
- Spoken style: Your Eminence
- Informal style: Cardinal
- See: Vertara (titular)

He was created Cardinal-Deacon of S. Eugenio by John Paul II in the consistory of 21 October 2003.

According to Vatican journalist Sandro Magister, by the end of 2004, Herranz Casado was "constantly gaining influence" in the internal affairs of the Vatican. Along with Joseph Ratzinger, Angelo Sodano, and the Pope's private secretary, Archbishop Stanisław Dziwisz, Herranz Casado is believed to have been largely responsible for leading the Curia at times when the Pope was incapacitated by illness. Herranz finds conspiracy theories about Opus Dei particularly offensive, claiming that it has "no hidden agenda. The only policy is the message of Christ".

Upon the death of John Paul II on 2 April 2005, Herranz Casado and all major Vatican officials automatically lost their positions. Herranz Casado was confirmed as president of Legislative Texts by Pope Benedict XVI on the following 21 April. He was one of the cardinal electors in the 2005 papal conclave. Though not generally considered a strong candidate for the papacy himself, he was described as a highly influential insider with the potential to play the role of a "kingmaker" at the conclave. It has been reported that, both before and after Pope John Paul's death, Herranz convened meetings of cardinals at a villa in Grottarossa, a suburb of Rome. Pope Benedict XVI named Francesco Coccopalmerio to replace Herranz as President of the Pontifical Council for Legislative Texts on 15 February 2007.

In March 2012 Pope Benedict XVI established a Commission of Cardinals to investigate leaks of reserved and confidential documents on television, in newspapers, and in other communications media (in what is known as the Vatileaks scandal). It first met on Tuesday, 24 April 2012. Herranz served as the chair, and was accompanied by Cardinals Jozef Tomko and Salvatore De Giorgi.

Having been a cardinal-deacon for ten years, he was promoted to cardinal-priest by Pope Francis on 12 June 2014.

Catholic Church titles
Preceded by Rosalio José Castillo Lara	Secretary of the Pontifical Council for the Interpretation of Legislative Texts; 25 January 1983 – 19 December 1994	Succeeded by Bruno Bertagna
Titular see created	— TITULAR — Titular Bishop of Vertara; 15 December 1990 – 19 December 1994	Himself as Titular Archbishop
Himself as Titular Bishop	— TITULAR — Titular Archbishop of Vertara; 19 December 1994 – 21 October 2003	Succeeded by John Michael Miller
Preceded by Vincenzo Fagiolo	President of the Pontifical Council for Legislative Texts; 19 December 1994 – 15 February 2007	Succeeded by Francesco Coccopalmerio
Preceded by Mario Francesco Pompedda	President of the Disciplinary Commission of the Roman Curia; 3 December 1999 – 11 May 2010	Succeeded by Giorgio Corbellini
Preceded by Francesco Colasuonno	Cardinal-Deacon of Sant'Eugenio; 21 October 2003 – 12 June 2014	Himself as Cardinal-Priest
Himself as Cardinal-Deacon	Cardinal-Priest 'pro hac vice' of Sant'Eugenio; 12 June 2014 –	Incumbent
