= Apostolic Nunciature to Egypt =

Diplomatic post of the Holy See

The Apostolic Nunciature to Egypt is an ecclesiastical office of the Catholic Church in Egypt. It is a diplomatic post of the Holy See, whose representative is called the Apostolic Nuncio with the rank of an ambassador. The Apostolic Nuncio to Egypt is usually also the Apostolic Delegate to the Arab League and Apostolic Nuncio to Oman upon his appointment to said nations.

== Representatives of the Holy See to Egypt ==
Apostolic delegates

- Jean-Baptiste Auvergne (29 March 1833 – 7 September 1836)
- Perpetuo Guasco (7 June 1839 – 26 August 1859)
- Paškal Vujičić (7 September 1860 – 6 August 1866)
- Ljudevit Ćurčija (27 July 1866 – 1 May 1881)
- Anacleto Chicaro (17 May 1881 – 5 October 1888)
- Guido Corbelli (9 Oct 1888 – 22 June 1896)
- Gaudenzio Bonfigli (25 February 1896 – 6 April 1904)
- Aurelio Briante (23 July 1904 – February 1921)
- Andrea Cassulo (24 January 1921 – 7 May 1927)
- Valerio Valeri (18 October 1927 – 3 April 1933)
- Riccardo Bartoloni (9 April 1933 – 11 October 1933)
- Torquato Dini (12 November 1933 – 26 March 1934)
- Gustavo Testa (4 June 1934 – 23 August 1947)
  - He continued as apostolic delegate to several countries when he lost responsibility for Egypt with the erection of a nunciature and the appointment of an internuncio.

Apostolic internuncios

- Arthur Hughes (23 August 1947 – 12 July 1949)
- Albert Levame (3 October 1949 – 16 June 1954)
- Georges-Marie de Jonghe d'Ardoye (2 Mar 1955 – 23 November 1956)
- Silvio Oddi (11 January 1957 – 17 May 1962)
- Mario Brini (13 June 1962 – 2 October 1965)

Apostolic pro-nuncios

- Lino Zanini (4 January 1966 – 7 May 1969)
- Bruno Heim (7 May 1969 – 16 July 1973)
- Achille Glorieux (3 August 1973 – 1984)
- Giovanni Moretti (10 July 1984 – 15 July 1989)
- Antonio Magnoni (22 July 1989 – 18 March 1995)

Apostolic nuncios

- Paolo Giglio (25 March 1995 – 5 February 2002)
- Marco Dino Brogi (5 February 2002 – 27 January 2006)
- Michael Louis Fitzgerald (15 February 2006 – 23 October 2012)
- Jean-Paul Gobel (5 January 2013 – 3 January 2015)
- Bruno Musarò (5 February 2015 – 29 August 2019)
- Nicolas Thévenin (4 November 2019 – present)

== See also ==
- Foreign relations of the Holy See
- List of diplomatic missions of the Holy See
