= George Koovakad =

Indian Cardinal of Catholic Church

Mar George Jacob Koovakad ܡܵܪܝ ܓܝܼܘܲܪܓܝܼܣ ܝܲܥܩܘܿܒ݂ ܟܘܼܘܲܟܵܕ
- Cardinal; Prefect of the Dicastery for Interreligious Dialogue
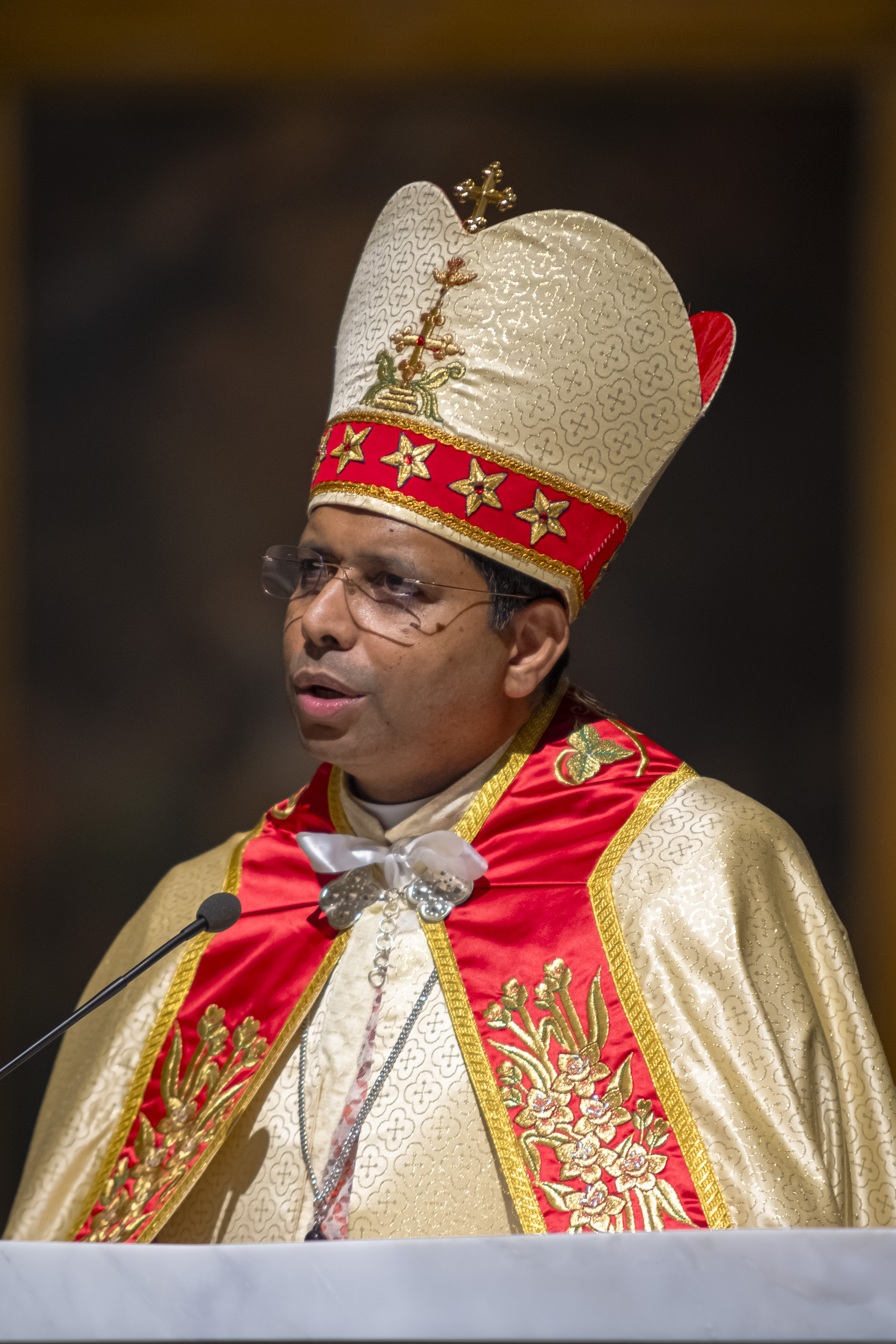
- Koovakad in 2025
- Church: Syro-Malabar Church
- Archdiocese: Syro-Malabar Catholic Archeparchy of Changanassery
- Appointed: 24 January 2025
- Predecessor: Miguel Ángel Ayuso Guixot
- Other posts: Head of the Journeys Office of the Secretariat of State of the Holy See (2021–); Cardinal-Deacon of Sant'Antonio di Padova a Circonvallazione Appia (2024–)
- Previous posts: Official of the Secretariat of State of the Holy See (2006–2021); Titular Archbishop of Nisibis of the Chaldeans (2024)

Orders
- Ordination: 24 July 2004 by Mar Joseph Powathil
- Consecration: 24 November 2024 by Mar Raphael Thattil
- Created cardinal: 7 December 2024 by Pope Francis
- Rank: Cardinal-Deacon

Personal details
- Born: 11 August 1973 (age 53) Chethipuzha, Kerala, India
- Education: SB College Changanasserry; Pontifical University of the Holy Cross
- Alma mater: Pontifical University of the Holy Cross
- Motto: Fragantiam Christi caritatis effundere; (To pour out the fragrance of Christ's charity)
- Coat of arms

Ordination history
History
Priestly ordination
- Ordained by: Joseph Powathil
Episcopal consecration
- Consecrated by: Raphael Thattil

George Jacob Koovakad (Syriac: ܡܵܪܝ ܓܝܼܘܲܪܓܝܼܣ ܝܲܥܩܘܿܒ݂ ܟܘܼܘܲܟܵܕ) (born 11 August 1973) is an Indian cardinal of the Syro-Malabar Catholic Church who is prefect of the Dicastery for Interreligious Dialogue since 2025. Since 2020, he has worked in the offices of the Holy See's Secretariat of State in the Journeys Office, which was responsible for organizing Pope Francis' overseas trips, and has headed that office since 2021. From 2006 to 2020, he served assignments in several countries while working in the diplomatic service of the Holy See.

After Pope Francis announced his intentions to make Koovakad a cardinal on 6 October 2024, he received episcopal consecration on 24 November and was officially made a cardinal on 7 December.

== Biography ==
George Koovakad was born in Chethipuzha, in the municipality of Changanacherry, Kottayam district, Kerala, on 11 August 1973.

He earned his intermediate and bachelor's degrees in chemistry from SB College, Changanassery in 1994 where he was also the president of Catholic Students Movement in the college. He obtained a licentiate in 2004, studying at St Thomas Minor Seminary, Kurichy, and St Joseph Pontifical Seminary, Aluva. He was ordained a priest of the Syro-Malabar Catholic Archeparchy of Changanacherry on 24 July 2004 by Archbishop Joseph Powathil. He served for a term as assistant vicar of St Mary's Church, Parel, Changanacherry.

Moving to Rome, he obtained a doctorate in canon law in 2006 from the Pontifical University of the Holy Cross with a thesis on "The Obligation of Poverty for Secular Clerics in the Codes of Canon Law".

After completing the preparatory program at the Pontifical Ecclesiastical Academy, he joined the diplomatic service of the Holy See in 2006. He worked in the nunciature in Algeria and then served as secretary of the nunciature in South Korea from 2009 to 2012 and in Iran from 2012 to 2014 and as counsellor of the nunciatures in Costa Rica from 2014 to 2018 and in Venezuela from 2018 to 2020. On 1 October 2014 he was given the title Chaplain of His Holiness, and on 13 December 2019 that of Prelate of Honor of His Holiness.

In July 2020 he joined the staff of the Secretariat of State (Note: He was working on papal trips when Pope Francis bade farewell to his predecessor and announced his role as "director" of travels while flying to Budapest on 21 September 2021.) and since 2021 has organized several papal trips, including visits to Canada, the Democratic Republic of the Congo, and South Sudan, as well as a lengthy trip to Indonesia, Papua New Guinea, Timor-Leste, and Singapore.

In 2024 he visited India to lead Holy Week services at his family's home parish, Lourde Matha Parish at Mammood in Changanacherry.

On 6 October 2024, Pope Francis announced he intended to make Koovakad a cardinal on 8 December, a date that was later changed to 7 December. Fr. Antony Vadakkekara, spokesman for the Syro-Malabar Catholic Church, said: "It is a great honor for the Syro-Malabar Church as one of its sons is elevated as cardinal directly, which is first in India." Previously the only members of the Syro-Malabar Church named cardinals were Major Archbishops.

Pope Francis appointed Koovakad titular archbishop of Nisibis of the Chaldeans on 25 October 2024, and Koovakad received his episcopal consecration on 24 November 2024 in Changanassery Cathedral from Major Archbishop Raphael Thattil.

On 7 December 2024, Pope Francis made him a cardinal, assigning him as a member of the order of cardinal deacons the deaconry of Sant'Antonio di Padova a Circonvallazione Appia.

In place of the red biretta given to the new cardinals of the Latin rite, Francis placed a black and red shash on Koovakad's head. The shash is commonly used by other churches of East Syriac tradition, such as the Chaldean Catholic Church.

On 11 January 2025, he was named a member of the Dicastery for the Eastern Churches. On 24 January 2025, he was appointed prefect of the Dicastery for Interreligious Dialogue. He is the third prelate from India to head a Curial department, the first from the Syro-Malabar Catholic Church. He continues to serve as head of the Journeys Section of the Secretariat of State.

Koovakad participated as an elector in the 2025 papal conclave that elected Pope Leo XIV in May 2025. As the most junior cardinal deacon, he was responsible for a variety of administrative functions, such as selecting by lot the cardinals responsible for counting the ballots and opening and closing the doors of the Sistine Chapel as necessary.

== See also ==
- Catholic Church in India
- Cardinals created by Pope Francis

== Notes ==
Catholic Church titles
Preceded by Karl-Josef Rauber	Cardinal-Deacon of Sant'Antonio di Padova a Circonvallazione Appia; 7 December 2024 – present	Incumbent
Preceded by Miguel Ángel Ayuso Guixot	Prefect of the Dicastery for Interreligious Dialogue; 25 January 2025 – present	Incumbent
