= Miguel Ángel Ayuso Guixot =

Spanish Catholic cardinal (1952–2024)

His Eminence Miguel Ángel Ayuso Guixot M.C.C.J.
- President of the Pontifical Council for Interreligious Dialogue
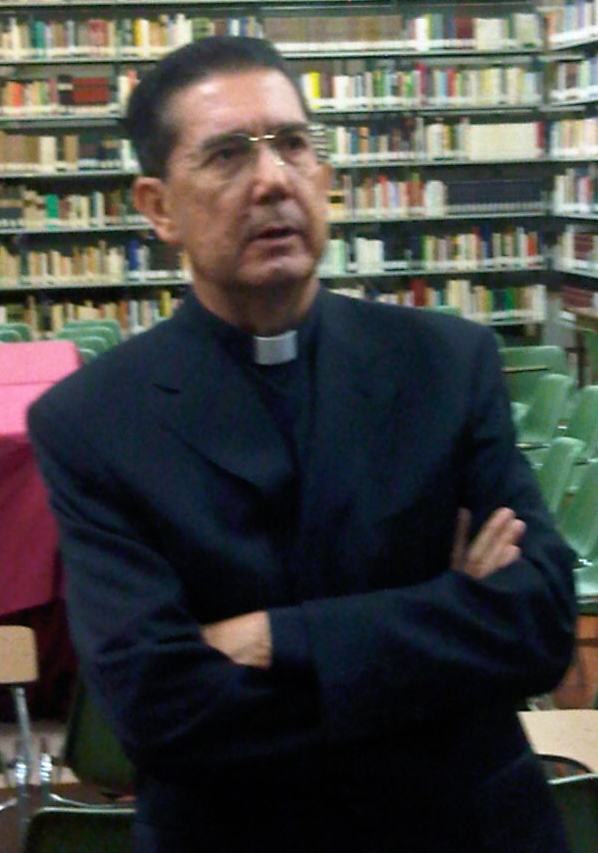
- Ayuso Guixot in 2021
- Church: Roman Catholic Church
- Appointed: 25 May 2019
- Predecessor: Jean-Louis Tauran
- Successor: George Koovakad
- Other posts: Prefect of the Commission for Religious Relations with Muslims (2019–2024); Cardinal-Deacon of San Girolamo della Carità (2019–2024)
- Previous posts: Secretary of the Pontifical Council for Interreligious Dialogue (2012–2019); Titular Bishop of Luperciana (2016–2019)

Orders
- Ordination: 20 September 1980 by José María Bueno y Monreal
- Consecration: 19 March 2016 by Pope Francis
- Created cardinal: 5 October 2019 by Pope Francis
- Rank: Cardinal-Deacon

Personal details
- Born: Miguel Ángel Ayuso Guixot; 17 June 1952 Seville, Spain
- Died: 25 November 2024 (aged 72) Rome, Italy
- Education: Pontifical Institute of Arab and Islamic Studies; University of Granada
- Motto: Secundum misericordiam Tuam
- Coat of arms

Miguel Ángel Ayuso Guixot, MCCJ (17 June 1952 – 25 November 2024) was a Spanish prelate of the Catholic Church and a historian of Islam. He was an official of the Roman Curia since 2012 and an archbishop since 2016.

Pope Francis raised him to the rank of cardinal on 5 October 2019, an office he held until his death in 2024.

== Biography ==
Miguel Ayuso was born in Seville, Spain, on 17 June 1952. On 2 May 1980, he made his perpetual vows as a member of the Comboni Missionaries of the Heart of Jesus. He was ordained as a priest on 20 September 1980. He earned a licentiate in Arabic and Islamic studies at Rome's Pontifical Institute of Arab and Islamic Studies (PISAI) in 1982. He was a missionary in Egypt and Sudan from 1982 to 2002.

Beginning in 1989, he was professor of Islamic studies first in Khartoum, then in Cairo, and then President of PISAI from 2005 to 2012. He led interreligious discussions in Egypt, Sudan, Kenya, Ethiopia, and Mozambique.

He obtained a doctorate in dogmatic theology from the University of Granada in 2000.

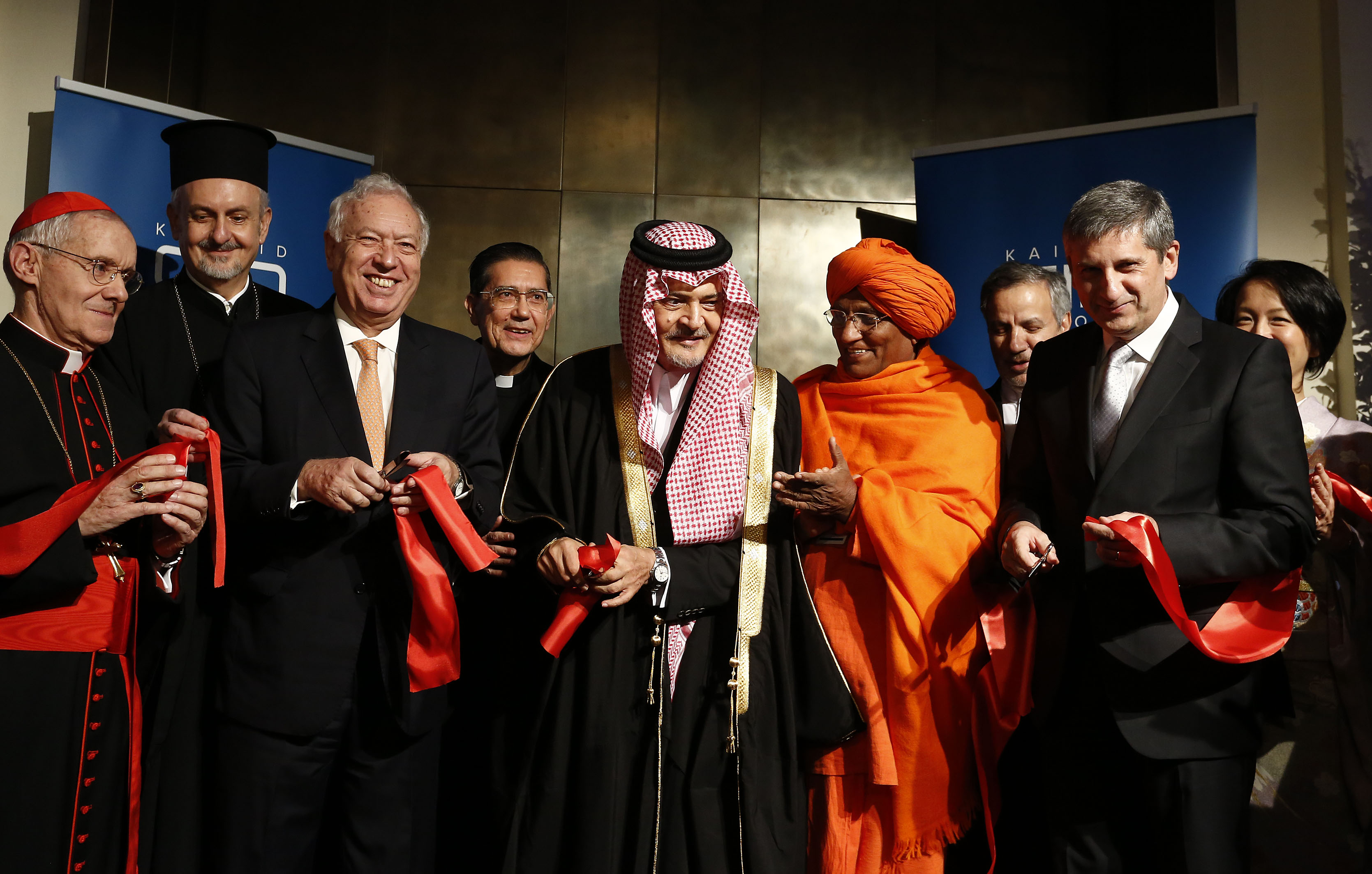
Ayuso Guixot (fourth from the left) at the opening of the Centre for Interreligious and Intercultural Dialogue in Vienna, 26 November 2012

On 20 November 2007, Pope Benedict XVI appointed him a consultant to the Pontifical Council for Interreligious Dialogue, and on 30 June 2012, Benedict named him Secretary of that Council. (Note: Pope Francis confirmed his appointment as Secretary on 29 March 2014.) Benedict named him a special auditor at the Synod of Bishops for the Middle East in 2010.

On 29 January 2016, Pope Francis appointed him Titular Bishop of Luperciana. He was ordained on 19 March by the pope himself.

He served as the Vatican's principal representative in restoring dialogue with Grand Imam Ahmed el-Tayeb of Cairo's Al-Azhar mosque, which were curtailed in 2011. He reported that the parties were focused on "joint initiatives to promote peace", the right to religious education, and the issue of religious freedom, looking to an agreement that establishes "the sacrosanct right to citizenship" for all, no matter their religion. His work culminated in the joint statement, the Declaration on Human Fraternity, issued by the Grand Imam and Pope Francis in February 2019 in Abu Dhabi.

Ayuso Guixot has represented the Holy See as a member of the board of directors of the King Abdullah Bin Abdulaziz International Centre for Interreligious and Intercultural Dialogue (KAICIID), a joint initiative of Saudi Arabia, Austria, and Spain, since its founding in Vienna in 2012.

On 25 May 2019, Pope Francis appointed him President of the Pontifical Council for Interreligious Dialogue. Pope Francis named him a member of the Congregation for the Oriental Churches on 6 August 2019.

On 5 October 2019, Pope Francis made him Cardinal Deacon of San Girolamo della Carità. He was made a member of the Congregation for the Oriental Churches on 21 February 2020.

Ayuso Guixot died in Rome's Gemelli Hospital on 25 November 2024, at the age of 72, after a long illness.

== See also ==
- Cardinals created by Francis

== Notes ==
Catholic Church titles
Preceded by Justo Lacunza Balda	President of the Pontifical Institute of Arab and Islamic Studies; 2006–2012	Succeeded by Valentino Cottini
Preceded by Pier Luigi Celata	Secretary of the Pontifical Council for Interreligious Dialogue; 30 June 2012 – 25 May 2019	Succeeded by Indunil Janakaratne Kodithuwakku Kankanamalage
Preceded by Pier Luigi Celata	Vice-Prefect of the Commission for Religious Relations with Muslims; 30 June 2012 – 25 May 2019	Vacant
Preceded by João Evangelista Pimentel Lavrador	Titular Archbishop of Luperciana; 29 January 2016 – 5 October 2019	Succeeded by Michael Arsenio Saporito
Preceded by Jean-Louis Tauran	President of the Pontifical Council for Interreligious Dialogue; 25 May 2019 – 25 November 2024	Succeeded by George Koovakad
Preceded by Jean-Louis Tauran	Prefect of the Commission for Religious Relations with Muslims; 25 May 2019 – 25 November 2024	Vacant
Preceded by Jorge María Mejía	Cardinal-Deacon of San Girolamo della Carità; 5 October 2019 – 25 November 2024	Vacant
