= Jean-Louis Tauran =

French Catholic prelate (1943–2018)

His Eminence Jean-Louis Tauran
- President of the Pontifical Council for Interreligious Dialogue; Camerlengo of the Holy Roman Church
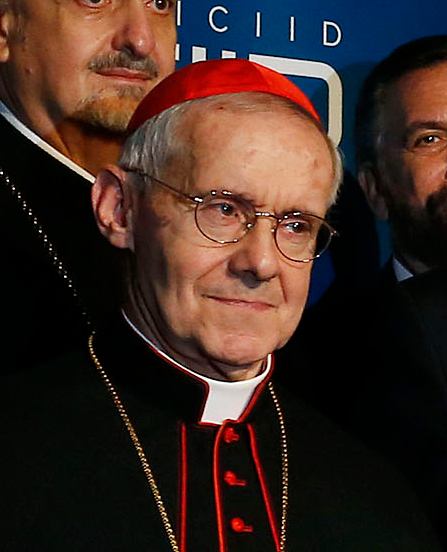
- Tauran in 2012
- Appointed: 25 June 2007 (President); 20 December 2014 (Camerlengo)
- Installed: 9 March 2015 (as Camerlengo)
- Term ended: 5 July 2018
- Predecessor: Paul Poupard (President) and Tarcisio Bertone (Camerlengo)
- Successor: Kevin Joseph Farrell (Camerlengo); Miguel Ángel Ayuso Guixot (President)
- Other post: Cardinal-Priest of Sant'Apollinare alle Terme Neroniane-Alessandrine pro hac vice (2003–18)
- Previous posts: Secretary for Relations with States (1990–2003); Librarian of the Holy Roman Church (2003–07); Titular Archbishop of Telephte (1990–2003); Archivist of the Holy Roman Church (2003–07); Protodeacon of the College of Cardinals (2011–14)

Orders
- Ordination: 20 September 1969 by Marius-Félix-Antoine Maziers
- Consecration: 6 January 1991 by Pope John Paul II
- Created cardinal: 21 October 2003 by Pope John Paul II
- Rank: Cardinal-Deacon (2003–14); Cardinal-Priest (2014–18)

Personal details
- Born: Jean-Louis Pierre Tauran; 5 April 1943 Bordeaux, France
- Died: 5 July 2018 (aged 75) Hartford, Connecticut, U.S.
- Denomination: Catholic (Roman Rite)
- Education: Pontifical Gregorian University; Pontifical Ecclesiastical Academy; Catholic University of Toulouse
- Motto: Veritate et Caritate; For truth and for love
- Coat of arms

Styles of Jean-Louis Tauran
- Reference style: His Eminence
- Spoken style: Your Eminence
- Informal style: Cardinal
- See: Thelepte (titular see)

Jean-Louis Pierre Tauran (French: [ʒɑ̃lwi toʁɑ̃]; 5 April 1943 – 5 July 2018) was a French cardinal of the Catholic Church. When he died, he had been the president of the Pontifical Council for Interreligious Dialogue since 2007 and Camerlengo of the Holy Roman Church since the end of 2014. He was made a cardinal in 2003 and was the Cardinal Protodeacon from 2011 to 2014. His earlier career included almost thirty years in the diplomatic service of the Holy See and several years as the Vatican's chief archivist and librarian.

== Early life and church service ==
Born in Bordeaux, France, Tauran studied at Pontifical Gregorian University in Rome, Italy, earning licentiates in philosophy and theology and a doctorate in canon law. He also studied at Pontifical Ecclesiastical Academy in Rome and Catholic University of Toulouse, France. He was ordained to the priesthood by Archbishop Marius Maziers on 20 September 1969 and worked as a curate in the Archdiocese of Bordeaux before entering the Vatican's diplomatic service in 1975. He was secretary of the nunciatures to the Dominican Republic (1975–1978) and to Lebanon (1979–1983). Tauran became an official of the Council for the Public Affairs of the Church in 1983, and then participated in special missions in Haiti (1984), and Beirut and Damascus (1986). He was also a member of the Vatican delegation to the meetings of the Conference on European Security and Cooperation, Conference on Disarmament in Stockholm, and Cultural Forum in Budapest and later Vienna.

=== Secretary for Relations with States ===
On 1 December 1990, Tauran was appointed Secretary for Relations with States of the Secretariat of State and Titular Archbishop of Thélepte by Pope John Paul II. He received his episcopal consecration on 6 January 1991 from John Paul II himself, with Archbishops Giovanni Battista Re and Justin Francis Rigali serving as co-consecrators, in St. Peter's Basilica. As Secretary, Tauran essentially served as the foreign minister of the Vatican. In regards to the Iraqi conflict, he once emphasized the importance of dialogue and the United Nations, and said that "a unilateral war of aggression would constitute a crime against peace and against the Geneva Conventions".

=== Cardinal-Deacon, Archivist and Librarian of the Holy Roman Church ===
Tauran was created Cardinal-Deacon of Sant'Apollinare alle Terme by Pope John Paul II in the consistory of 21 October 2003. On the following 24 November, he was named Archivist and Librarian of the Holy Roman Church, overseeing the Vatican Secret Archives and Vatican Library. In late 2003, Tauran drew attention to the "second-class" treatment of non-Muslims in "many Muslim countries", especially Saudi Arabia.

Representing the Pope, Tauran attended the March 2005 dedication of the new Holocaust museum at Yad Vashem in Jerusalem. Tauran was one of the cardinal electors who participated in the 2005 papal conclave that selected Pope Benedict XVI. He was also one of the cardinal electors in the 2013 conclave that elected Pope Francis. In the days prior to the 2013 conclave, the Vaticanologist John L. Allen Jr. viewed Tauran as a "long-shot" papabile. Allen remarked: "On paper, Tauran profiles as virtually the perfect anti-candidate, meaning someone who really shouldn't be in the running at all: a history of health scares, a career bureaucrat with zero pastoral experience, and a delicate personality at a time when many cardinals are seeking a strong governor."

As the Cardinal Protodeacon (senior Cardinal-Deacon) at the 2013 conclave, he announced the election of the new pope on 13 March 2013 and bestowed the pallium on Pope Francis at his papal inauguration on 19 March. In his role as Protodeacon for the 2013 conclave Tauran said that "people asked 'How do you prepare yourself for the Habemus Papam?' I'd say 'No, I'm preparing myself for the conclave.' The conclave is not like the parliament with a campaign. It's a spiritual meeting. You have to remember the conclave is a liturgical celebration particularly from the morning to the evening. It's a spiritual experience. It was very deep for me. It's the manifestation of the singularity of the Catholic Church. You can feel the richness of the life of the church and how the positive aspects are greater than the negative ones".

Cardinal Tauran exercised his option to be promoted to cardinal-priest (Note: Cardinal-deacons who have served ten years as cardinals may opt for the order of priests and be raised to the rank of cardinal-priest with either a new title or their deaconry elevated pro hac vice to a priest title.) and accordingly on 12 June 2014, Pope Francis elevated Tauran to the title of Cardinal-Priest. He was succeeded as Protodeacon by Cardinal Renato Raffaele Martino.

=== President of the Pontifical Council for Interreligious Dialogue ===
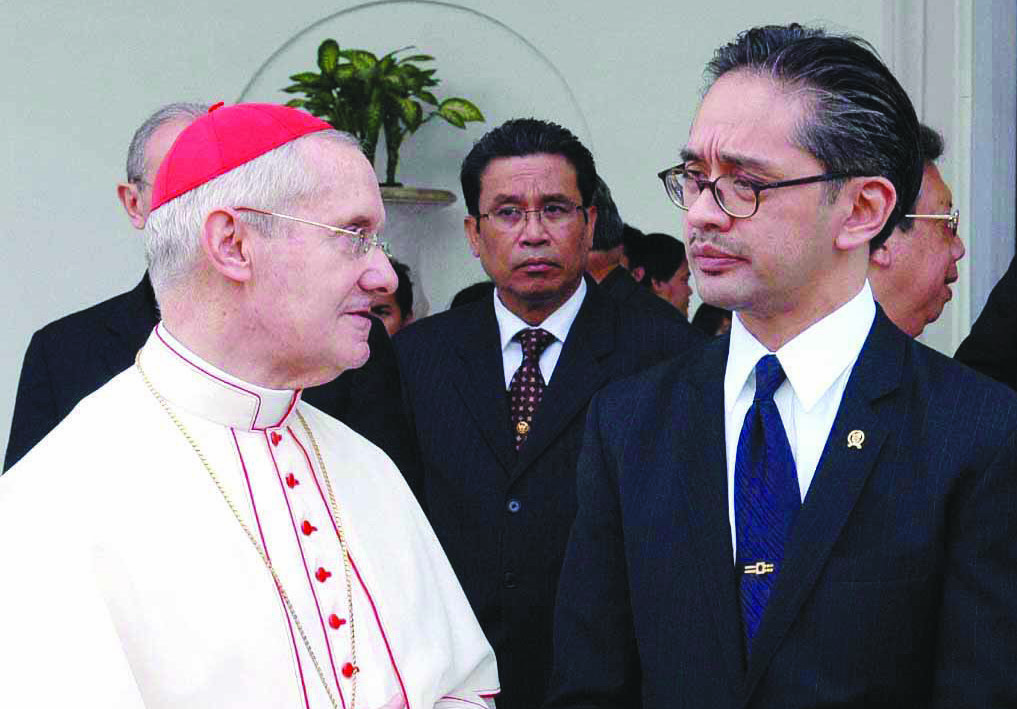
Tauran with Indonesian foreign minister Marty Natalegawa, December 2009.

Although he had Parkinson's disease, Tauran was appointed president of the Pontifical Council for Interreligious Dialogue on 25 June 2007, effective 1 September. In addition to his duties as president of the Pontifical Council for Interreligious Dialogue, he was a member of the Secretariat of State (Second Section); the Congregation for the Doctrine of the Faith; the Congregation for the Oriental Churches; the Congregation for Bishops; the Pontifical Council for Promoting Christian Unity; the Pontifical Council for Culture; the Apostolic Signatura; the Administration of the Patrimony of the Apostolic See; the Pontifical Commission for Vatican City State, and the Cardinal Commission for the Supervision of the Institute for Works of Religion (IOR).

Tauran was a friend of Anglican John Andrew (1931–2014), former rector of St. Thomas Church in New York City. For the fiftieth anniversary of Andrew's ordination in late June 2007, Tauran served as a guest preacher. He was a friend of the Anglican priest Roger Greenacre, former precentor of Chichester Cathedral in England. For Greenacre's fiftieth anniversary of his ordination at Michaelmas (the Feast of the Archangel Saint Michael) of 2005, Tauran traveled to Chichester and served as a guest preacher. He was also present at Greenacre's Memorial Requiem at Chichester Cathedral on 23 September 2011.

In an April 2012 message marking the upcoming Buddhist celebration of Vesakh, a feast commemorating the key events in the life of the Buddha, Tauran said that "Young people are an asset for all societies" and called for education about varieties of religious practice in order to allow them to "advance together as responsible human beings and to be ready to join hands with those of other religions to resolve conflicts and to promote friendship, justice, peace and authentic human development".

Tauran described his role as president of the Pontifical Council for Interreligious Dialogue, saying:

[Y]ou have to remember that interreligious dialogue is not dialogue between religions. It's dialogue between believers. It's not a theological, philosophical exercise. First you have to accept that we live in a world that's plural: culture, religion, education, scientific research. Every human being has a religious dimension. Between believers we try first of all to know each other. And the first thing you have to do is to proclaim your faith because you can not build that dialogue on ambiguity. When we are understood, we have to see what separates us and what unites us and to put those commonalities at the service of society. Dialogue is not for the consumption of the community. It's at the service of society. And remember that man doesn't live only on bread. There are spiritual dimensions. Believers have a special role to play in the public dialogue.

In June 2013, Pope Francis named Tauran a member of the five-person Pontifical Commission investigating the Institute for the Works of Religion.

=== Camerlengo ===
Pope Francis named Tauran to replace Cardinal Tarcisio Bertone as Camerlengo of the Holy Roman Church on 20 December 2014. Tauran was sworn in as Camerlengo, in the presence of Pope Francis, on 9 March 2015.

=== Death ===
Tauran showed evidence of Parkinson's disease as early as 2003, but his condition had stabilized sufficiently by 2007 for him to take on the Pontifical Council presidency. Tauran died aged 75 on 5 July 2018 in Hartford, Connecticut, where he had been hospitalized for treatment of Parkinson's. His remains were transferred to Rome where he received the customary funeral rites of a cardinal of the Roman Curia.

== Views ==
=== War in Iraq ===
Tauran was a "fierce critic" of U.S. plans to invade Iraq in 2003, which he said would constitute a "crime against peace" and a violation of international law. In August 2007 he said that the facts speak for themselves on Iraq, and that Christians had been better protected under Saddam Hussein.

=== Interfaith relations ===
Each year, the Pontifical Council for Interreligious Dialogue sends a message, signed by its president, to Hindus for the festival of Diwali, which is celebrated during the month of October. In the 2017 message, Tauran called for the promotion of integral development, protection of human life and respect for the dignity and fundamental rights of the person. The Council sends similar messages each year on the occasion of the feasts of Eid ul-Fitr (Islam) and Vesak (Buddhism).

=== Sharia ===
In a breakfast meeting with journalists in March 2008, Tauran said Rowan Williams, the Anglican Archbishop of Canterbury, had been "mistaken and naive" for suggesting that some aspects of Sharia law in Britain were unavoidable. He also lamented the fact that relations with Islam so dominated interreligious dialogue, and that all religions needed to be addressed on equal terms with none assigned second-class status.

== Notes ==
Catholic Church titles
New office	Undersecretary for Relations with States; 1 March 1989 – 1 December 1990	Succeeded by Claudio Maria Celli
Preceded by Angelo Sodano	Secretary for Relations with States; 1 December 1990 – 6 October 2003	Succeeded by Giovanni Lajolo
Preceded by Jorge María Mejía	Librarian of the Holy Roman Church; 24 November 2003 – 25 June 2007	Succeeded by Raffaele Farina, SDB
Preceded by Jorge María Mejía	Archivist of the Holy Roman Church; 24 November 2003 – 25 June 2007	Succeeded by Raffaele Farina, SDB
Preceded by Paul Poupard	President of the Pontifical Council for Interreligious Dialogue; 25 June 2007 – 5 July 2018	Succeeded by Miguel Ángel Ayuso Guixot
Preceded by Agostino Cacciavillan	Cardinal Protodeacon; 21 February 2011 – 12 June 2014	Succeeded by Renato Raffaele Martino
Preceded by Tarcisio Bertone, SDB	Camerlengo of the Holy Roman Church; 20 December 2014 – 5 July 2018	Succeeded by Kevin Joseph Farrell
