= Julien Ries =

Belgian religious historian, titular archbishop and cardinal of the Catholic Church

His Eminence Julien Ries
- Cardinal-Deacon of Sant’Antonio di Padova a Circonvallazione Appia
- See: Sant’Antonio di Padova a Circonvallazione Appia
- Appointed: 18 February 2012
- Installed: 20 October 2012
- Term ended: 23 February 2013
- Previous post: Titular Archbishop of Bellicastrum (2012)

Orders
- Ordination: 12 August 1945 by André Marie Charue
- Consecration: 11 February 2012 by Giacinto Berloco
- Created cardinal: 18 February 2012
- Rank: Cardinal-Deacon

Personal details
- Born: Julien Ries; 19 April 1920 Fouches, near Arlon, Belgium
- Died: 23 February 2013 (aged 92) Tournai
- Denomination: Catholic
- Motto: Caritas Christi urget nos
- Coat of arms

Julien Ries (19 April 1920 – 23 February 2013) was a Belgian religious historian, titular archbishop and cardinal of the Catholic Church. Prior to his death, Ries was described as "the greatest living religious scholar".

== Life ==
Born in Fouches, near Arlon, Belgium, he was ordained a priest for the Diocese of Namur on 12 August 1945. After graduating with a doctorate of Philosophy and receiving a licentiate in philology and Oriental history from the Catholic University of Leuven, Ries taught at the university from 1960 to 1968. After the university split in 1968, he taught at the French-speaking Université catholique de Louvain, where he founded the Centre d'Histoire des Religions (which has recently been named after him). During that period, he was also a member of the Pontifical Council for Interreligious Dialogue from 1979 to 1985. In 1990, Ries retired from active work.

Among the non-specialists in the anglophone world he was most known for his series for young people Religions of Humanity which he edited with American anthropologist Lawrence E. Sullivan (Head of the Centre for the Study of World Religions at Harvard University from 1990 to 2003). Ries and Sullivan received the Hans Christian Andersen Award for these series in 2000. Ries has developed a renewed religious anthropology in which the religious dimension of humankind is taken seriously. His conclusion was the same as that of the French paleontologist and co-discoverer of the fossil "Lucy" (Australopithecus afarensis), Yves Coppens, with whom he collaborated, i.e. that human beings have been religious right from the beginning.

In 2009, Ries donated his library, all his manuscripts, notes and documents relating to courses, and the correspondences he had with religious historians across the globe, to the Catholic University of Milan.

On 6 January 2012, it was announced that Ries would be created a cardinal the next month, and was appointed Titular Archbishop of Bellicastrum on 23 January 2012. He received episcopal consecration at the parish church of Notre-Dame de la Visitation, in Villers-Notre-Dame, Hainaut on 11 February 2012. The principal consecrator was Archbishop Giacinto Berloco, Apostolic Nuncio to Belgium, assisted by Bishop Rémy Victor Vancottem of Namur and Bishop Guy Harpigny of Tournai as principal co-consecrators.

Ries was created Cardinal-Deacon of Sant'Antonio di Padova a Circonvallazione Appia by Pope Benedict XVI in the consistory at St. Peter's Basilica on 18 February 2012. He died on 23 February 2013.

== Distinctions ==
=== Orders ===
- Holy See: Order of the Holy Sepulchre

=== Academic ===
- Honorary Doctorate of the Catholic University of Milan (27 October 2010) for works in philosophy and bio-ethics because of "the intricate value of his study" and his "tireless scientific and cultural activity"

=== Fellowships ===
- Honorary Life Member of the International Association for the History of Religions

=== Other ===
- Dumas Millier prize of the Académie française (1986)
- Furtado prize (1987) of the Académie française

Catholic Church titles
Preceded by Pietro Sambi	Titular Archbishop of Bellicastrum; 2012–2012	Succeeded by José Rodríguez Carballo
New title	Cardinal-Deacon of Sant'Antonio di Padova a Circonvallazione Appia; 2012–2013	Vacant
