= Michael Fitzgerald (cardinal) =

British Catholic cardinal (born 1937)

His Eminence Michael Fitzgerald MAfr OBE
- Cardinal, Apostolic Nuncio
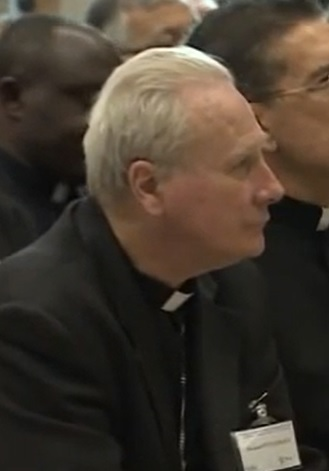
- Fitzgerald in 2015
- Church: Catholic Church
- Appointed: 15 February 2006
- Retired: 5 January 2013
- Other post: Cardinal-Deacon of Santa Maria in Portico (2019–present)
- Previous posts: President of the Pontifical Council for Interreligious Dialogue (2002–2006); Secretary of the Pontifical Council for Interreligious Dialogue (1987–2002); Titular Archbishop of Nepte (2002–2019); Titular Bishop of Nepte (1992–2002)

Orders
- Ordination: 3 February 1961 by William Godfrey
- Consecration: 6 January 1992 by Pope John Paul II
- Created cardinal: 5 October 2019 by Pope Francis
- Rank: Cardinal deacon

Personal details
- Born: 17 August 1937 (age 89) Walsall, United Kingdom
- Denomination: Catholic (Roman Rite)
- Education: SOAS University of London; Pontifical Gregorian University
- Motto: Fructum dabit

Styles of Michael Louis Fitzgerald
- Reference style: His Eminence; The Most Reverend Eminence
- Spoken style: Your Eminence
- Religious style: Cardinal
- Informal style: Cardinal

Michael Louis Fitzgerald MAfr OBE (born 17 August 1937) is a British cardinal of the Roman Catholic Church and an expert on Christian–Muslim relations. He has had the rank of archbishop since 2002. At his retirement in 2012, he was the Apostolic Nunciature to Egypt and delegate to the Arab League. He headed the Pontifical Council for Interreligious Dialogue from 2002 to 2006. Pope Francis raised him to the rank of cardinal on 5 October 2019.

Fitzgerald is an expert on Islam, Christian–Muslim relations and interreligious dialogue within the senior hierarchy of the Catholic Church. His publications include Dieu rêve d'unité. Les catholiques et les religions: les leçons du dialogue. Entretiens avec Annie Laurent (Paris, Bayard Presse, 2005) and (with John Borelli) Interfaith Dialogue. A Catholic View, (SPCK, London & Orbis Books, Maryknoll, NY, 2006), both translated into Italian. He is fluent in Arabic.

== Early life and education ==
Michael L. Fitzgerald was born in the UK in Walsall, Staffordshire, on 17 August 1937, into a Roman Catholic family of Irish descent, and attended Queen Mary's Grammar School. Desiring from an early age to become a priest and a missionary, he joined the junior seminary of the Missionaries of Africa (White Fathers) at the age of twelve, first in Scotland, then in the South of England. He studied philosophy for two years, the first in England and the second in Ireland. He made his novitiate in the Netherlands from 1956 to 1957 and pursued his theological studies from 1957 to 1961 in Tunisia, where he began learning Arabic and acquiring some knowledge of Islam. Cardinal William Godfrey, Archbishop of Westminster, ordained him a priest of the Society of Missionaries of Africa (White Fathers) on 3 February 1961.

Upon ordination in 1961 he was sent to Rome to study Dogmatic Theology at the Pontifical Gregorian University. Among his teachers was the Jesuit theologian Bernard Lonergan. This was the time of the Second Vatican Council (1962–1965) which provided the opportunity of attending lectures by theologians including Karl Rahner and Yves Congar. He completed his doctorate in Theology in 1965 on the missionary intention in the writings of the Latin apologists.

== Scholar, teacher, and pastor ==
In 1965 he started a BA in Arabic at the School of Oriental and African Studies, University of London, graduating in 1968, whereupon he became a lecturer at the Institut Pontifical d'Études Arabes (later renamed the Pontifical Institute of Arab and Islamic Studies (PISAI)).

After one year lecturing at the PISAI, he was appointed lecturer in the Department of Religious Studies at Makerere University, Kampala, Uganda, where he taught courses on Islam to Muslim as well as to Christian students. In 1971 he returned to Rome to pursue his teaching and scholarly interests at the PISAI. From 1972 to 1978 he was Director of the PISAI. During this period Fitzgerald was involved in the creation of Encounter, Documents for Christian-Muslim Understanding, a periodical publication on Islam, and supervised the launch of Islamochristiana, a scholarly journal specialised in Christian-Muslim relations and interreligious dialogue. In 1972 he became consultor of the Pontifical Council for Interreligious Dialogue, then known as Secretariat for Non-Christians.

In 1978 he returned to Africa to carry out parish work in Sudan, in the town of New Halfa (Archdiocese of Khartoum). His duties included ministering to the Christian population while also cooperating with the Muslim community. In 1980 he was elected to the General Council of the Missionaries of Africa in Rome, where he spent six years managing and organising.

== Pontifical Council for Interreligious Dialogue ==
In 1987 he was appointed Secretary of the Secretariat for Non-Christians, which was renamed the Pontifical Council for Interreligious Dialogue (PCID) in 1988. In that capacity, Fitzgerald helped draft Dialogue and Proclamation, one of the Roman Catholic Church's documents concerning the relationship between dialogue and evangelisation. On 16 December 1991, Fitzgerald was appointed titular bishop of Nepte. He was consecrated at Saint Peter's Basilica by Pope John Paul II on 6 January 1992.

On 1 October 2002, Pope John Paul named him to succeed Cardinal Francis Arinze as President of the PCID and gave him the rank of archbishop as well. This made him the highest-ranking British citizen in the Roman Curia.

== Diplomatic career ==
On 15 February 2006, Pope Benedict XVI appointed him Apostolic Nuncio to Egypt and Delegate to the Arab League, his first diplomatic posting. He was one of the few nuncios not to have attended the Pontifical Ecclesiastical Academy. According to the BBC, "The decision by the German-born pontiff has caused a stir. Vatican watchers are trying to work out whether the move is a demotion or recognition of the special talents of the archbishop." Fitzgerald said: "My background in Arabic and Islamic studies is probably considered useful at this moment for the development of relations with Egypt and the rest of the Islamic world." One Vatican correspondent said that the decision to send "the smartest guy in the Vatican on relations with Muslims" overseas was "the Pope's worst decision so far" and the press noted Fitzgerald's absence when Pope Benedict offended Muslims with his Regensburg lecture in September 2006. Fitzgerald's transfer proved to be part of Benedict's restructuring of curial departments to reorient interreligious discussions with non-Christians by uniting the role of president of the PCID with that of the Pontifical Council for Culture, a restructuring that Benedict initiated in March 2006 and reversed in June 2007.

He resigned from his diplomatic positions in October 2012.

== Later career ==
In retirement, he remained at the Missionaries of Africa in Jerusalem until early 2019, when he returned to England to work in a Liverpool parish.

On 1 September 2019, Pope Francis announced he would make him a cardinal. On 5 October 2019, Pope Francis made him Cardinal-Deacon of Santa Maria in Portico.

== Views on interreligious dialogue ==
According to Fitzgerald, the impetus for interreligious dialogue in the Catholic Church stems from the Second Vatican Council, in particular the declaration Nostra aetate ('In our Time') on relations with other religions, especially Judaism but also Islam. In conveying for the first time a positive assessment of other religious traditions, the declaration emphasises dialogue between people rather than systems. Fitzgerald further argues that the aim of interreligious dialogue is not to produce a new world religion or to achieve some sort of theological unity between all religions. In this, it differs radically from ecumenical dialogue conducted with the various Christian churches with a view to a unity of worship grounded on a unity of faith. Indeed, theological dialogue with followers of other religions, the 'dialogue of discourse', is especially difficult due to the divergence of beliefs, and requires participants with a thorough theological education, but such dialogue can serve to eliminate false problems. Other forms of dialogue are important, such as the dialogue of life, the dialogue of action and the dialogue of religious experience.

Fitzgerald was appointed Officer of the Order of the British Empire (OBE) in the 2022 New Year Honours for services to interfaith and interchurch partnerships.

== Works ==
- (with R. Dionne) Catalysts, The White Fathers of Africa, Dublin, 1980, revised edition 1998.
- (with R. Caspar) Signs of Dialogue. Christian Encounter with Muslims, Silsilah Publications, Zamboanga City, 1992.
- Dieu rêve d'unité. Les catholiques et les religions: les leçons du dialogue. Entretiens avec Annie Laurent, Paris, Bayard Presse, 2005.
- (with John Borelli) Interfaith Dialogue. A Catholic View, SPCK, London & Orbis Books, Maryknoll, NY, 2006.

== See also ==
- Pope Benedict XVI Islam controversy
- Cardinals created by Francis
- List of heads of the diplomatic missions of the Holy See

Catholic Church titles
Preceded by Marcello Zago	Secretary of the Pontifical Council for Interreligious Dialogue; 22 January 1987 – 1 October 2002	Succeeded by Pier Luigi Celata
Preceded by Camillo Ruini	— TITULAR — Titular Bishop of Nepte; 16 December 1991 – 1 October 2002	Himself as Titular Archbishop
Himself as Titular Bishop	— TITULAR — Titular Archbishop of Nepte; 1 October 2002 – 5 October 2019	Succeeded by Ignacio Damián Medina
Preceded by Francis Arinze	President of the Pontifical Council for Interreligious Dialogue; 1 October 2002 – 15 February 2006	Succeeded by Paul Poupard
Preceded by Francis Arinze	Prefect of the Commission for Religious Relations with Muslims; 1 October 2002 – 15 February 2006	Succeeded by Paul Poupard
Diplomatic posts
Preceded by Marco Dino Brogi	Apostolic Nuncio to Egypt; 15 February 2006 – 5 January 2013	Succeeded by Jean-Paul Aimé Gobel
Preceded by Marco Dino Brogi	Delegate to the League of Arab States; 15 February 2006 – 5 January 2013	Succeeded by Jean-Paul Aimé Gobel
Preceded by Andrea Cordero Lanza di Montezemolo	Cardinal-Deacon of Santa Maria in Portico; 5 October 2019 –	Incumbent
