= Pontifical commission =

Commission of the Roman Curia

A pontifical commission (Latin: pontificia commissio) is a committee of Catholic experts convened by the Pope for a specific purpose. The following is a list of commissions, the dates they began and the pope who established.

== Current commissions ==
1. Pontifical Commission for Sacred Archaeology, 6 January 1852 by Pope Pius IX.
2. Pontifical Biblical Commission, 30 October 1902 by Pope Leo XIII.
3. Pontifical Commission for Latin America, 19 April 1958 by Pope Pius XII.
4. International Theological Commission, 11 April 1969 by Pope Paul VI.
5. Pontifical Commission for Religious Relations with the Jews, 22 October 1974 by Pope Paul VI.
6. Pontifical Commission for Religious Relations with Muslims, 22 October 1974 by Pope Paul VI.
7. Pontifical Commission for Vatican City State, 26 November 2000 by Pope John Paul II.
8. Pontifical Commission for the Protection of Minors, 22 March 2014 by Pope Francis.
9. Pontifical Commission for the Activities of Public Juridical Persons of the Church in the Healthcare Sector, 12 December 2015 by Pope Francis.
10. Pontifical Commission for the World Day of Children, November 2024 by Pope Francis.

== Former commissions ==
Former pontifical commissions include:

1. Council for the Implementation of the Constitution on the Sacred Liturgy (1964 - 1970 Pope Paul VI)
2. Pontifical Commission for Russia (1925 Pope Pius XI – 1993 Pope John Paul II).
3. Pontifical Commission for the Drafting of the Code of Eastern Canon Law (1935 Pope Pius XI – 1991 Pope John Paul II).
4. Pontifical Commission on Birth Control (1963 Pope John XXIII – 1968 Pope Paul VI).
5. Pontifical Commission for the Cultural Heritage of the Church (1988 Pope John Paul II – 2012 Pope Benedict XVI).
6. Pontifical Commission Ecclesia Dei (1988 Pope John Paul II – 2017 Pope Francis).
7. Pontifical Commission for Reference on the Institute for Works of Religion (2013 – 2014 Pope Francis).
8. Pontifical Commission for Reference on the Organisation of the Economic-Administrative Structure of the Holy See (2013 Pope Francis – 2014 Pope Francis).

== Permanent interdicasterial commissions ==
- Interdicasterial Commission on Particular Churches, 18 March 1989 by Pope John Paul II.
- Interdicasterial Commission for Consecrated Religious, 18 March 1989 by Pope John Paul II.
- Interdicasterial Commission for Candidates to Sacred Order, 18 March 1989 by Pope John Paul II.
- Interdicasterial Commission for the Church in Eastern Europe, 15 January 1993 by Pope John Paul II.
- Interdicasterial Commission for the Revision of the General Regulations of the Roman Curia, 12 April 2022 by Pope Francis.
- (former) Interdicasterial Commission for the Catechism of the Catholic Church, (1993 Pope John Paul II – 1997 Pope John Paul II).
