= Paolo Giglio =

Maltese Catholic archbishop, Vatican diplomat

Paolo Giglio (20 January 1927 – 6 March 2016) was a Maltese prelate of the Catholic Church, who worked in the diplomatic service of the Holy See from 1958 to 2002, with the rank of archbishop and nuncio from 1986.

== Biography ==
Paolo Giglio was born in Valletta, Malta, on 20 January 1927 to Angelo Giglio and Ludgarda nee Borg. After studying at the local seminary, he earned a licenciate in theology and a doctorate in canon law at the Pontifical Gregorian University. He was ordained to the priesthood in 12 April 1952.

In preparation for a diplomat's career, he completed the course of study at the Pontifical Ecclesiastical Academy in 1956. He was secretary at the Holy See's missions in Nicaragua (1958–59), Argentina (1960–62), and Iran (1963–65); auditor in Vietnam (1966–68) and Yugoslavia (1969-70); counsellor in the United States (1971–72) and Brazil (1973–75); counsellor and deputy head of mission in France (1976–77); and chargé d’affaires in Taiwan (1978–86).

On 4 April 1986 Pope John Paul II named him titular archbishop of Tyndaris and Apostolic Nuncio to Nicaragua.

He was named Apostolic Nunzio to Egypt on 25 March 1995. On 8 February 2000, he was named Apostolic Delegate to the League of Arab States as well.

Giglio retired on 5 February 2002 when he was replaced as nuncio to Egypt by Marco Dino Brogi.

He died on 6 March 2016.
