= Nicolas Thévenin =

French bishop and Vatican diplomat

His Excellency, The Most Reverend Nicolas Thévenin
- Apostolic Nuncio of Egypt and Oman; Apostolic Delegate to the Arab League; Titular Archbishop of Aeclanum
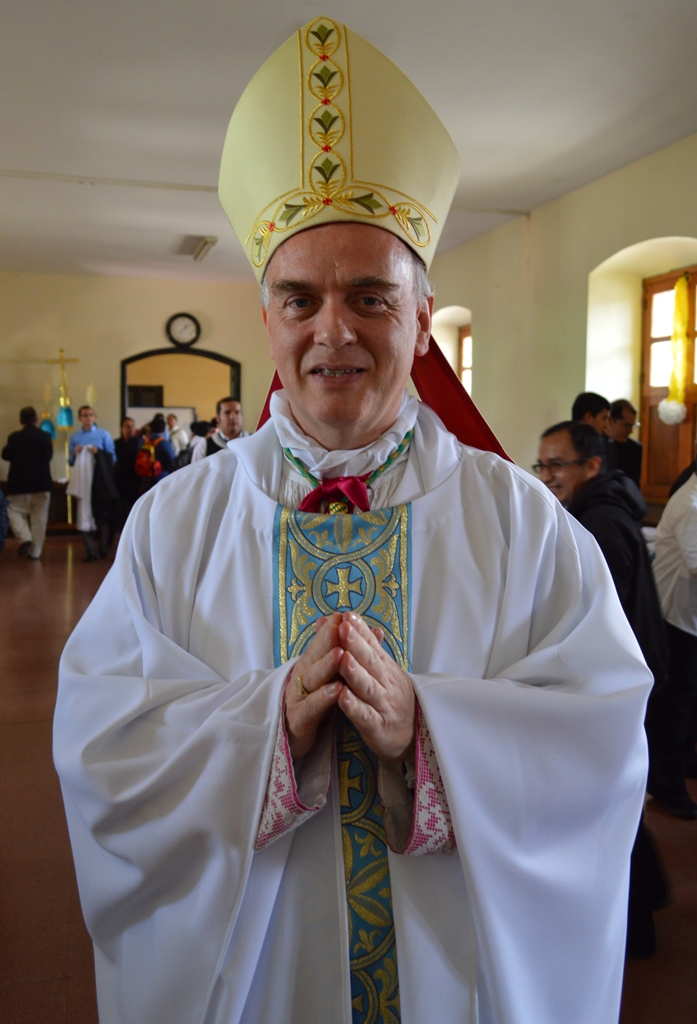
- Archbishop Thevenin in December 2014
- Appointed: 4 November 2019
- Predecessor: Bruno Musarò
- Other post: Titular Archbishop of Aeclanum
- Previous post: Apostolic Nuncio to Guatemala (2013-2019)

Orders
- Ordination: 4 July 1989 by Giovanni Canestri
- Consecration: 6 January 2013 by Pope Benedict XVI, Tarcisio Bertone, and Zenon Grocholewski

Personal details
- Born: June 5, 1958 (age 68) Saint-Dizier, Haute-Marne , France
- Motto: VERITAS VIS MISERICORDIÆ

Styles of Nicolas Thévenin
- Reference style: His Excellency; The Most Reverend
- Spoken style: Your Excellency
- Religious style: Archbishop

Nicolas Henry Marie Denis Thevenin (born 5 June 1958) is a French prelate of the Catholic Church who works in the diplomatic service of the Holy See. He has been Apostolic Nuncio to Egypt since 2019 and to Oman since 2023.

== Biography ==
Nicolas Henry Marie Denis Thevenin was born on 5 June 1958 in Saint-Dizier in the Haute-Marne region of France. He graduated from Commercial Institute of Nancy in 1981. He entered the seminary of Genoa, Italy, as a member of the Community of Saint Martin. He holds a doctorate in canon law. He was ordained a priest on 4 July 1989 for the Archdiocese of Genoa.

== Diplomatic career ==
He joined the diplomatic services of the Holy See on 1 July 1994. His service took him to India, the Democratic Republic of the Congo, Belgium, Lebanon, Cuba, and Bulgaria. In 2005 he joined the staff of the State Relations Section of the Secretariat of State in Rome. In 2006, when Cardinal Tarcisio Bertone was appointed Secretary of State, Thévenin joined his private secretariat.

On 8 January 2010, he was appointed Apostolic Protonotary. On 5 March 2011, French President Nicolas Sarkozy awarded him the Legion of Honor.

On 15 December 2012, Pope Benedict XVI named him titular archbishop of Aeclanum and assigned him the rank of apostolic nuncio. On 5 January 2013, he was appointed Apostolic Nuncio to Guatemala. On 6 January he received his episcopal consecration from Pope Benedict XVI.

On 4 November 2019, Pope Francis named him Apostolic Nuncio to Egypt and Apostolic Delegate to the Arab League.

On 22 May 2023, Pope Francis named him as the first Apostolic Nuncio to Oman.
