= Kurichy =

- village
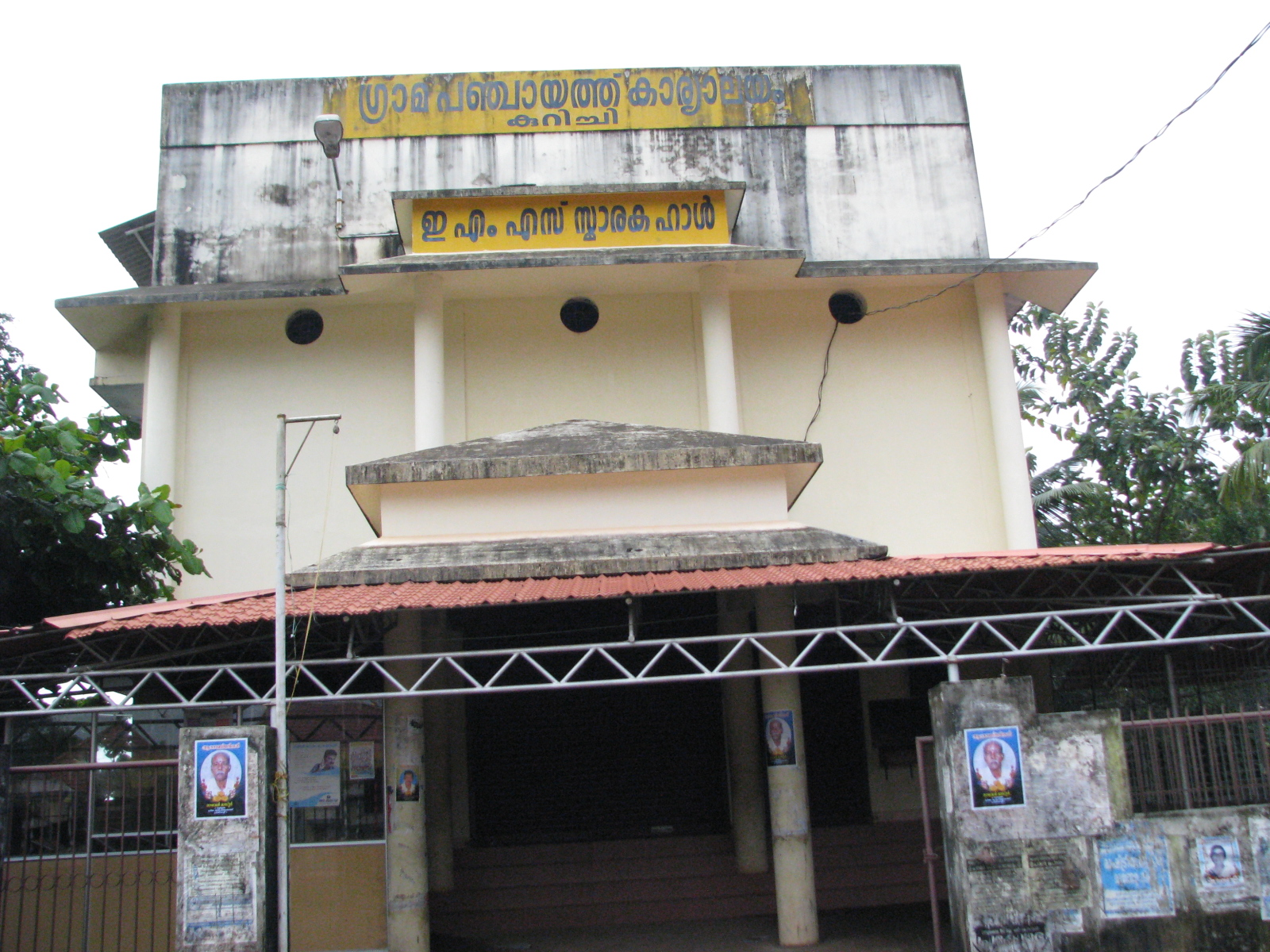
- Kurichy Panchayath office
- Interactive map of Kurichy
- Coordinates: 9.506799°N 76.526556°E
- Country: India
- State: Kerala
- District: Kottayam

Languages
  - Official: Malayalam, English
- Time zone: UTC+5:30 (IST)
- Nearest city: Changanacherry

Kurichy is a village in Changanacherry Municipality in Kottayam district, in the southern Indian state of Kerala.

== Location ==
Kurichy lies on the main Central Road which runs through the entire state of Kerala. The nearest towns to Kurichy are Changanacherry and Kottayam. Kurichy is 7 kilometers from Changanacherry by road.

Chethipuzha is near Kurichy.

== Origin ==
Kurichy was formerly known as "Gurushreepuram", meaning "the land of Vishnu [Guru] and Lakshmi [Shree]", which later became truncated to its current name.

== Places in and around Kurichy ==
The central area of Kurichy is known as the "Kurichy Out Post", named after an earlier police outpost. It acts as the major junction to the western areas. The west of Kurichy connects to places such as Kainady and Kavalam which are parts of Kuttanadu. The east part of Kurichy is Vakathanam. The surrounding areas of Kurichy are Neelamperoor, Mandiram, Thuruthy and Pathamuttom.

== Churches ==
Christians in Kurichy are mainly Syrian Christians, and Latin Christians. The Holy Trinity Church, Changanacherry is the largest born again church in the Municipality. There is an Anglican Church of India near the Main Central Road. There is a church for the Knanaya Jacobite Christian named Mor Ignatious Church and one more Church having Knanaya Jacobite Christian in Kurichy nearby Neelamperoor named St George Knanaya Church. Both the Churches are more than 100 Years old. St Mary's Jacobite church is in Ithithanam at Ponpuzha pokkam

St. Xavier's Latin catholic church is an ancient church where the holy relic of St. Francis Xavier is kept for worship. The evening worship of Wednesdays, worship in holy week and the feast of the church attract many devotees. The feast of St. Francis Xavier is celebrated at this church in December in every year. There is also an LP school named little flower that is also a part of this church. There is an old age home named St. Joseph's Old Age Home [part of Koottogne charity worldwide]. The sisters in this old age home are from Korea.

St. Mary's Jacobite Syrian Soonoro Church is an ancient church where the holy relic of St. Mary is kept for worship. The evening worship on Tuesdays attracts many devotees. The Feast of St. Mary is celebrated at this Church every year from 1 to 8 September, every year.

== Temples ==
Nearby Hindu temples include the Edanaattu Indilayappa Swami Temple, Thrikkapaleswarm Shiva temple, Shankarapuram Shiva Temple, Cheruparakavu Devi temple. The Edanaattu Indalayappa Swami Temple is especially well known, and hosts the Kiratham Kathakali performance on the day of Makaravilakku.

Puthanpally junction is located one kilometer west of the Out Post junction. The Shiva temple Trikkapaleshwaram and Cheruparakavu Devi temple are situated in this place. SNDP Gurusreepuram Sakha is located near Trikkapaleshwaram temple.

A Shri Rama temple is located at Sachivothamapuram near to Kurichy. The place is named after Sir CP Ramaswamy Iyer who was given the title "Sachivothama" by the then Maharajah of Travancore, Shri Chithira Thirunal Balaramavarma. Sir CP was the Diwan (Prime Minister) of Travancore from 1936 to 1947.
