= Sant'Antonio di Padova a Circonvallazione Appia =

Catholic church in Rome

- Chiesa di Sant'Antonio di Padova a Circonvallazione Appia
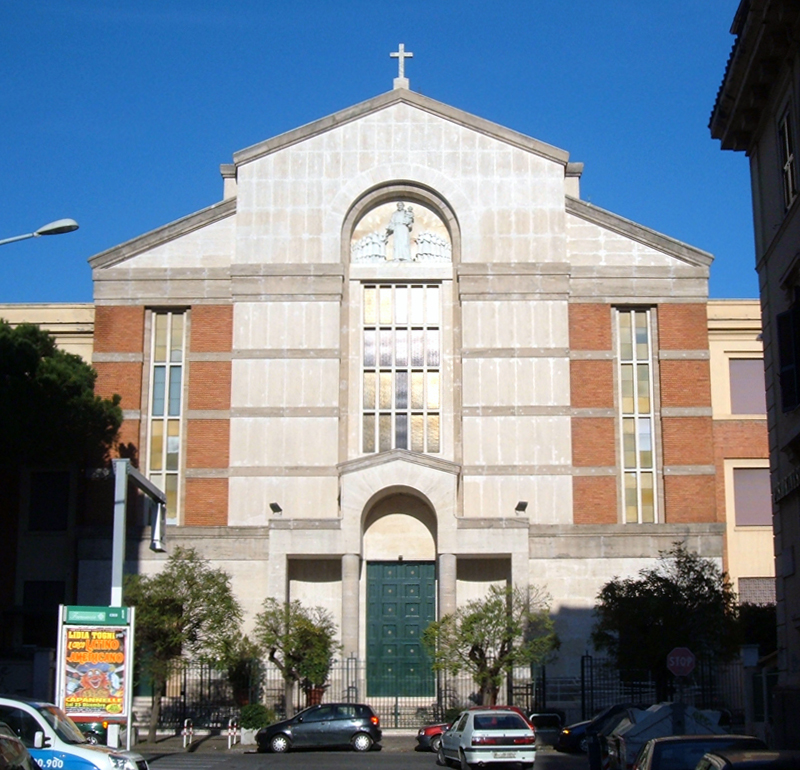
- Facade

- Location within Rome
- 41°52′30.65″N 12°30′46.51″E
- Location: Circonvallazione Appia, 150, Rome
- Country: Italy
- Denomination: Catholic Church
- Sui iuris church: Latin Church
- Website: parrocchiasantantonio.it

History
- Status: titular church
- Dedication: Anthony of Padua

Architecture
- Style: Rationalist
- Completed: 1938

Administration
- Diocese: Rome

Sant'Antonio di Padova a Circonvallazione Appia (Saint Anthony of Padua at the Appian Ring-Road) is a church in Rome, built in 1938 in the Rationalist style. It was made a cardinalate deaconry on 18 February 2012 by Pope Benedict XVI. The recent assigned cardinal is George Jacob Koovakad.

== Cardinal-Deacons ==
- Julien Ries (18 February 2012 – 23 February 2013)
- Karl-Josef Rauber (14 February 2015 – 26 March 2023)
- George Koovakad (7 December 2024 –)
