= Shōchō Hagami =

Japanese acharya (1903–1989)

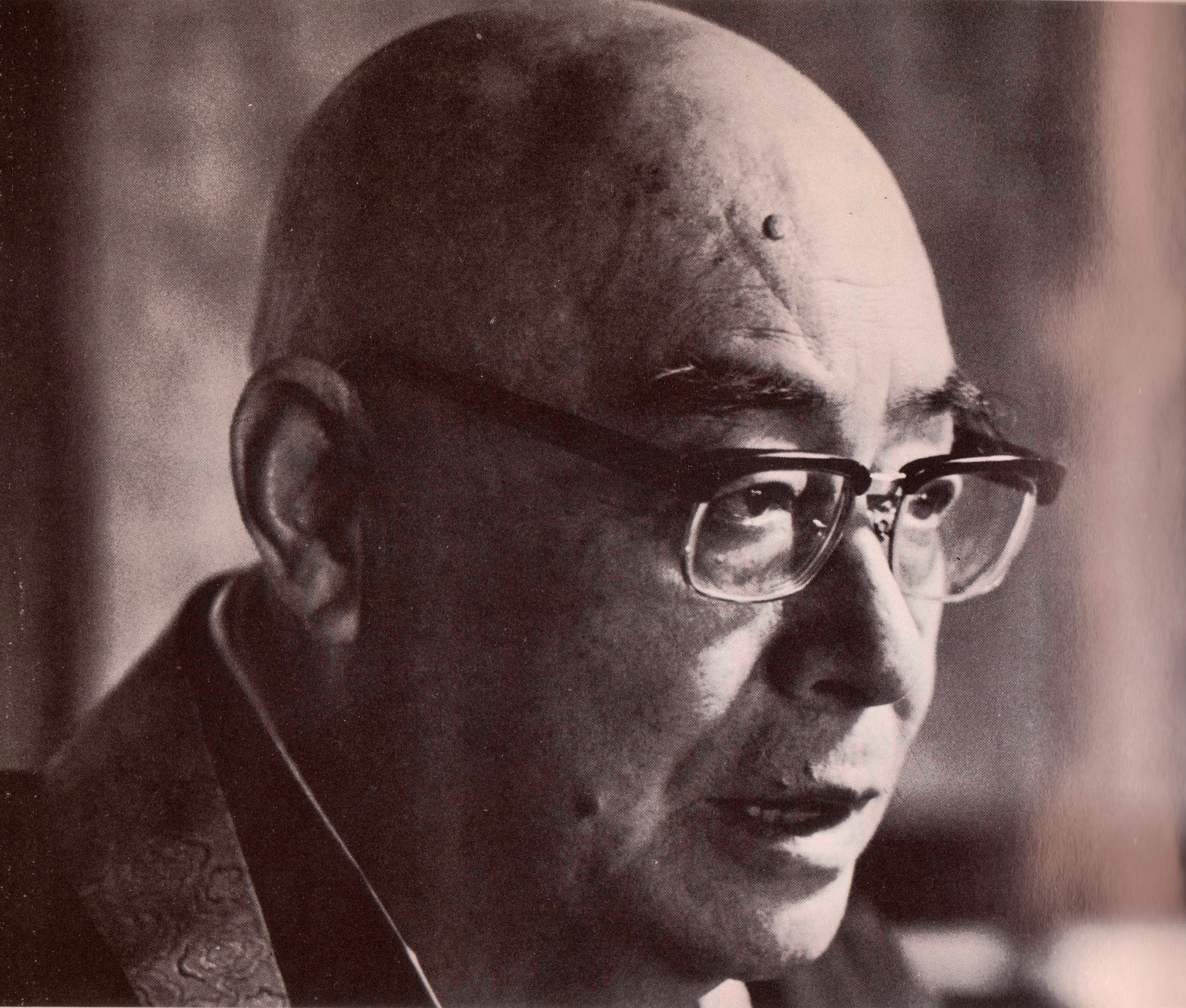
- Born: August 15, 1903; Akaiwa, Okayama, Japan
- Died: March 7, 1989 (aged 85); Shiga, Japan
- Occupation: Great Acharya of Tendai Buddhism

Shōchō Hagami (葉上照澄; August 15, 1903 – March 7, 1989) was a Japanese great acharya (大阿闍梨) of Tendai Buddhism and one of the most prominent Japanese Buddhists of the 20th century. He served as President of the Japanese Religious Committee for World Federation and advocated the need for the cooperation of religious leaders, which transcends religious and denominational boundaries.

Hagami was originally a professor of German philosophy at Taisho University and in turn served as a journalist for the Sanyo Shimbun. However, the untimely death of his wife as well as the defeat of Japan at WWII triggered him to pursue religious life, whereby to help Japan restore itself from the postwar devastation. In 1946, he entered the Buddhist monastery at Mount Hiei, the headquarters of the Tendai school and the Mother Mountain of Japanese Buddhism.

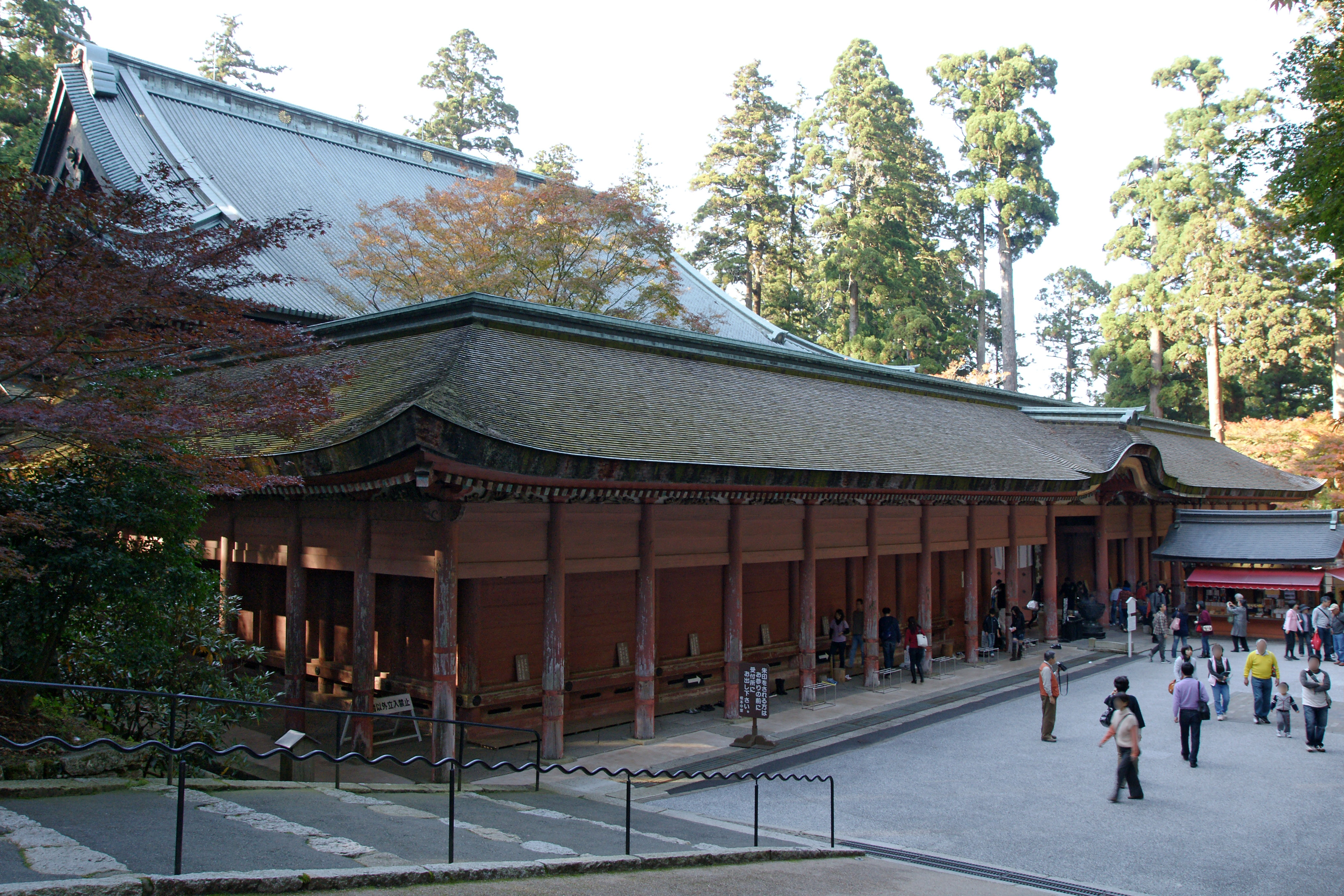
Buddhist monastery at Mount Hiei Enryaku-ji

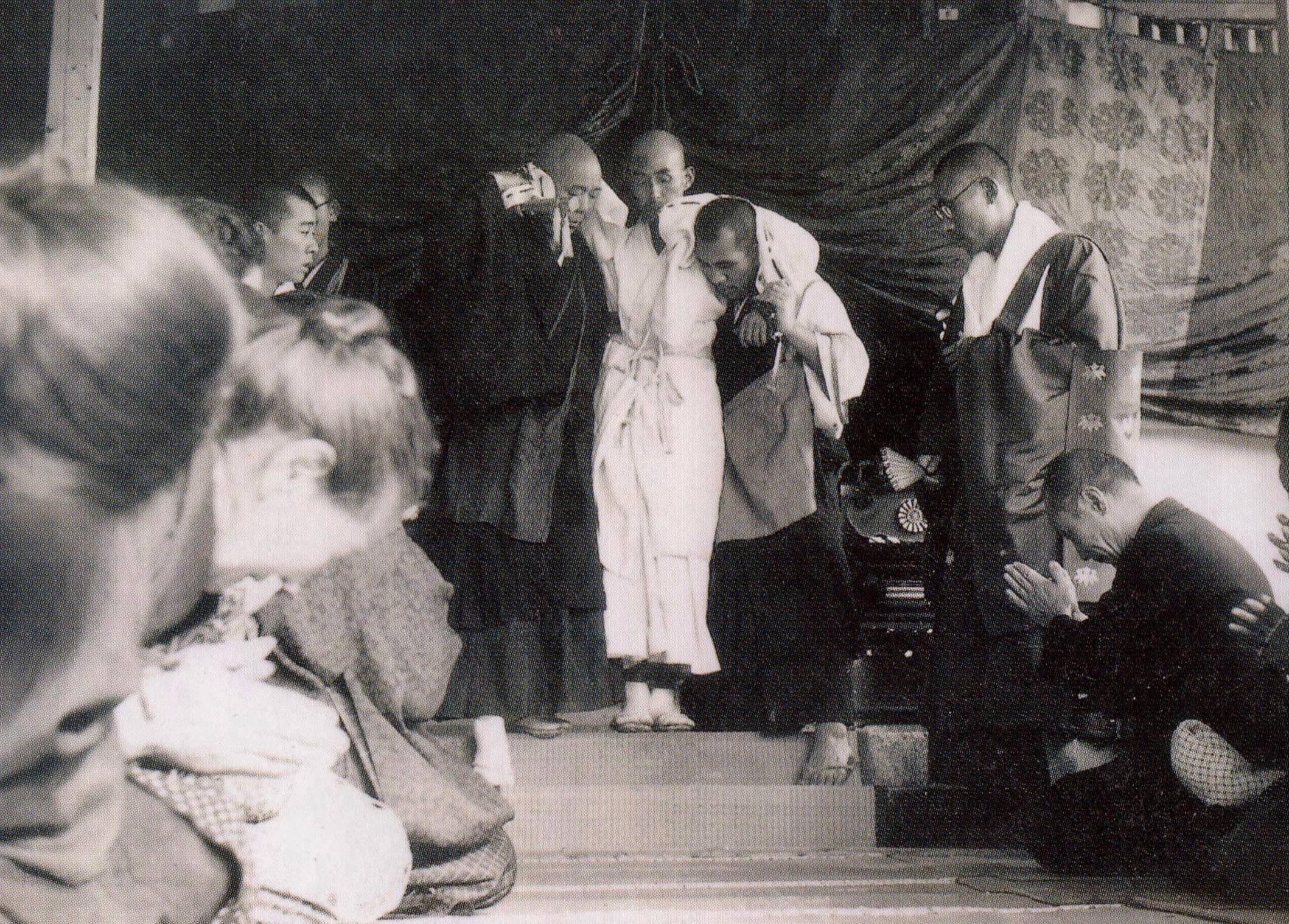
Shocho Hagami during the Sennichi Kaihogyo

Hagami was the 39th monk in history who completed the ordeal of endurance, perseverance, and both physical and mental strength, known as Sennichi Kaihōgyō in Japanese (千日回峰行), or “thousand-day around-the-peaks training.” He also completed other ordeals such as a thousand days of Unshin Kaihōgyō (運心回峰行) and a thousand days of Hokke Zanmaigyō (法華三昧行). While fostering new generations of Japan for lives of influence and service, Hagami was actively engaged in promoting reconciliation and peaceful coexistence across the world. He appealed to Pope Paul VI and other religious leaders of the world to create an International League of all religious people of the whole world in order to end all the wars among religions as well as all the conflicts caused in the name of religions.

Hagami once noted: “It is said that the root of all evil is human pride, obstinacy, human ego, class ego, racial ego, and national ego. Yet religion which is supposed, above all, to teach the casting away of ego, itself has the egoism of sects and religious institutions. And this is what makes me dislike religionists. . . . True religion is born from the abyss of despair. I believe that when it really becomes a question of whether mankind will survive or not, then religion will return to a purer position, and will set out in a great new direction.”

Hagami maintained that for the advancement of world peace, Judaism, Christianity, and Islam must be reconciled, and that Japanese Buddhists—as religious people of the first victim of nuclear attack in human history—must serve as mediators for that reconciliation. Accordingly, he visited Egypt and the Vatican many times and established close friendships with the Egyptian President Anwar Sadat as well as with Cardinal Sergio Pignedoli of the Vatican.

In July 1977, Hagami visited President Sadat and urged him to make peace with Israel. This was one of the triggers that led Sadat's dramatic journey to the Knesset in Israel. Sadat himself mentioned Hagami's impact on this initiation in his letter of gratitude to Hagami.

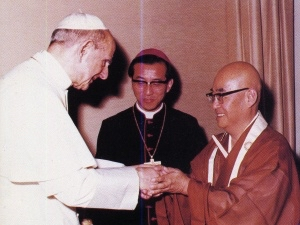
Shocho Hagami and Pope Paul VI

At Hagami's suggestion, Sadat also sponsored a communal service in November 1979, gathering representatives of Islam, Judaism and Christianity at the foot of Mount Sinai on the occasion of the transfer of the Sinai Peninsula from Israel to Egypt.

In October 1981, when Hagami learned about the assassination of Sadat, he felt personally responsible for Sadat's death. Sadat was said to have been killed for shaking hands with Jews, which Hagami urged Sadat to do. In March 1984, as a way, in part, to commemorate Sadat's death, Hagami organized a joint prayer meeting for world peace on Mount Sinai, by appealing to religious leaders in the US and Egypt. 130 people assembled there to represent Judaism, Christianity, Islam, Buddhism, and Shinto, from the US, Egypt, Israel and Japan, and prayed for the speedy end of the Middle East War and performed different religious ceremonies according to the respective styles of rituals.

In August 1987, Hagami invited prominent leaders of various religions of the world to hold the first Religious Summit Meeting on Mount Hiei, Japan, in order to advance peaceful coexistence, interfaith dialogue, and acceptance of others. He visited Israel in 1988 and was acquainted with a variety of religious leaders and scholars such as André Chouraqui, R.J. Zwi Werblowsky, and Chief Rabbi Mordechai Eliyahu. To further advance interfaith dialogue, Hagami planned to hold a Religious Summit Meeting in Jerusalem but died before its fruition.
