= Gustavo Testa =

Italian prelate (1886–1969)

His Eminence Gustavo Testa
- Cardinal-Priest of San Girolamo dei Croati
- Appointed: 14 December 1959
- Term ended: 28 February 1969
- Predecessor: Santiago Luis Copello
- Successor: Paolo Bertoli
- Previous posts: Titular Archbishop of Amasea (1934–1959); Apostolic Delegate to Egypt, Arabia, Eritrea, Abyssinia and Palestine (1934–1948); Apostolic Delegate to Jerusalem, Palestine, Transjordania, and Cyprus (1948–1953); Nuncio to Switzerland (1953–1959); Prefect of the Congregation for the Oriental Churches (1962–1968)

Orders
- Ordination: 28 October 1910
- Consecration: 1 November 1934 by Alfredo Ildefonso Schuster
- Created cardinal: 14 December 1959 by Pope John XXIII

Personal details
- Born: 28 July 1886 Boltiere, Bergamo, Kingdom of Italy
- Died: 28 February 1969 (aged 82) Rome, Italy
- Denomination: Roman Catholic
- Motto: Et patria et cor (The country and the heart)
- Coat of arms

Styles of Gustavo Testa
- Reference style: His Eminence
- Spoken style: Your Eminence
- Informal style: Cardinal
- See: none

Gustavo Testa (28 July 1886 – 28 February 1969) was an Italian prelate of the Catholic Church, who was made a cardinal in 1959. He spent his career in the Roman Curia. He entered the diplomatic service of the Holy See in 1920 and held several appointments as papal nuncio from 1934 to 1959. He headed the Congregation for the Oriental Churches from 1962 to 1968.

== Biography ==
Born to a wealthy family in Boltiere, in the province of Bergamo, Testa attended the Pontifical Lateran University, Pontifical Roman Athenaeum S. Apollinare, and Pontifical Biblical Institute in Rome. He was ordained to the priesthood on 28 October 1910, and finished his studies in 1912. After a period of pastoral work in Bergamo and teaching at its seminary, Testa entered the Roman Curia, in the Secretariat of State, in 1920. He then served as secretary of the nunciature to Austria until 1923. Testa was raised to the rank of Privy Chamberlain of His Holiness on 28 October 1921, and later Domestic Prelate of His Holiness on 18 May 1923. He was also named auditor for the Bavarian nuniciature in 1927 before becoming counselor of the nunciature to Italy in 1929.

On 4 June 1934, Testa was appointed Titular Archbishop of Amasea and Apostolic Delegate to Egypt, Arabia, Crete, Abyssinia, Palestine, Transjordan, and Cyprus. He received his episcopal consecration on the following 1 November from Cardinal Ildefonso Schuster, OSB, with Bishops Adriano Bernareggi and Angelo Roncalli serving as co-consecrators. Testa was later named the first Apostolic Delegate to Palestine, Transjordania and Cyprus when it was established on 11 February 1948, and Nuncio to Switzerland on 6 March 1953.

Pope John XXIII created him Cardinal-Priest of San Girolamo dei Croati in the consistory of 14 December 1959. On 4 October 1961, Cardinal Testa was made Pro-President of the Cardinalitial Commission for the Special Administration of the Holy See. Pope John appointed him Secretary of the Congregation for the Oriental Churches on 2 August 1962. Testa was one of the cardinal electors who participated in the 1963 papal conclave that elected Cardinal Montini as Pope Paul VI; during the conclave, Testa lost his temper and demanded that the opponents of continuing the Second Vatican Council stop blocking Montini's election. As Secretary of the Congregation for Oriental Churches, he accompanied Pope Paul on his journey to the Holy Land in 1964.

He became Pro-Prefect of the Congregation for the Oriental Churches in 1965 when Pope Paul VI decided to no longer reserve the title of Prefect to himself. (Note: He was Pro-Prefect on 1 May 1967 when Pope Paul marked the fiftieth anniversary of its creation, several months before the 15 August 1967 date sometimes attached his assuming the Prefect's title, which is the date of Pope Paul's apostolic constitution Regimini Ecclesiae Universae, which provided for the Congregation to be headed by a Cardinal Prefect.) From 1962 to 1965, he attended the Second Vatican Council.

Pope Paul accepted his resignation as Pro-Prefect of the Congregation for the Oriental Churches on 13 January 1968, and then as Pro-President of the Special Administration of Holy See on 7 May 1968.

Testa died in Rome at age 82, and is buried in Bergamo.

== Pope John XXIII ==
Testa had been a close friend of Pope John XXIII, also from Bergamo, since they were schoolmates in Rome.

== Notes ==
Catholic Church titles
Preceded by Valerio Valeri	Apostolic Delegate to Egypt, Arabia, Crete, Abyssinia, Palestine, Transjordan, and Cyprus; 1934–1948	Succeeded by Arthur Hughes, MAfr
Preceded by none	Apostolic Delegate to Palestine, Transjordania and Cyprus; 1948–1953	Succeeded by Silvio Oddi
Preceded by Filippo Bernardini	Nuncio to Switzerland; 1953–1959	Succeeded by Alfredo Pacini
Preceded by Gabriel Coussa	Prefect of the Congregation for the Oriental Churches; 1962–1968	Succeeded by Maximilien de Fürstenberg
