= John Paul II Center for Interreligious Dialogue =

The John Paul II Center for Interreligious Dialogue was an academic center that serves to build bridges between religious traditions, particularly between Catholic Christian and Jewish pastoral and academic leaders. The Center is a partnership between the Russell Berrie Foundation and the Pontifical University of Saint Thomas Aquinas (Angelicum). It operated as part of the Section for Ecumenism and Dialogue in the Theology Faculty of the Angelicum in Rome.

== Mission and history ==
The mission of the John Paul II Center for Interreligious Dialogue was to build bridges between Christian and other religious traditions by promoting interreligious study and dialogue locally in Rome and on the global level through academic study and formation for religious leadership and dialogue in life and action.

The Center was officially opened in 2010 after an agreement was reached between the Angelicum and the Russell Berrie Foundation, based on several years of close collaboration between two of the Angelicum faculty, Rev. Frederick M. Bliss, SM, then-director of the Ecumenical Section of the Theology Faculty, and Rabbi Jack Bemporad, director of the Center for Interreligious Understanding, in New Jersey.. The Russell Berrie Fellowship in Interreligious Studies was offered from October 2008.

In December 2024, the center officially closed, as the sundowning of the Russell Berrie Foundation prompted consolidation of its funded programs. Over 15 years, the Center has produced 133 Fellows, and funded 40 projects and initiatives.

== Dedicated to John Paul II ==
The most famous alumnus of the Angelicum is Karol Wojtyła – Pope John Paul II – who earned a doctorate of philosophy there in the late 1940s.

As a child, Karol Wojtyla forged close relationships with Jewish families in his Polish hometown, witnessed first hand the horrors of the Second World War and Soviet communism, and was deeply influenced in his studies by Jewish philosophers Martin Buber and Emmanuel Levinas. All of these life events contributed to his commitment to interreligious bridge building.

As bishop of Rome, Pope John Paul II was a tireless advocate for interreligious dialogue, and lead the Catholic Church in its implementation of the Vatican Council II documents Nostra aetate and Dignitatis humanae, including profound work for the healing of memories, outreach to the Jewish community, and establishing the Assisi interreligious day of prayer for peace. Pope John Paul II died on 2 April 2005, after nearly 27 years as bishop of Rome. He was beatified on 1 May 2011 at St. Peter's Square in Rome, at a ceremony attended by approximately 2 million people, including representatives of the John Paul II Center.

== Programs ==
The Center operated under the auspices of the Ecumenical Section in the Faculty of Theology, but serves as a resource for all faculty, students and guests of the university on interreligious issues and subjects. The Center provides support for the visiting faculty and students in its various programs, which include the following.

=== Russell Berrie Fellowship in Interreligious Studies ===
The Russell Berrie Fellowship in Interreligious Studies was designed to provide current and future religious leadership with a comprehensive understanding of and dedication to interreligious ideas, issues, and concerns. The Fellowship invites religious leaders – whether ordained, religious, or lay – to spend a year in Rome studying at the Angelicum for a Certificate in Interreligious Studies, participate in a seminar and study tour in Israel, and in a number of specialized courses and extracurricular activities.

The Fellowship was the only “full-ride” scholarship available for most students at the pontifical universities in Rome, as it covers tuition, room and board, books and travel expenses.

=== Seminar and study tour in the Holy Land ===
“Jerusalem and Judaism: Identity and Challenges” is the study tour in which the Russell Berrie Fellows participate as a part of their program. The three major components of include the academic seminar organized and staffed by the Shalom Hartman Institute in Jerusalem, the pilgrimage to Jewish and Christian Holy Land around Jerusalem and in the Galilee, and a series of cultural meetings and programs with local leaders. The study tour generally has taken place between semesters, in February.

=== Annual Pope John Paul II Lecture on Interreligious Understanding ===
One of the largest and most high-profile events of the Angelicum has been the Pope John Paul II Lectures on Interreligious Understanding. Globally-recognized religious leaders and academics have been invited each spring to offer insights into contemporary developments in interreligious dialogue.

- 2008: Archbishop Donald Wuerl, Washington, DC, USA “Unifying Threads among World Religions: The Common Ground in Search for World Peace”
- 2009: Chief Rabbi Michael Schudrich, Warsaw, Poland “A Rabbi’s Reflection on the Teachings of John Paul II”
- 2010: Prof. Mona Siddiqui, OBE, University of Glasgow, Scotland “Islamic Perspectives on Judaism and Christianity”
- 2011: Prof. David F. Ford, University of Cambridge, England “Jews, Christians, and Muslims meet around their Scriptures: An Inter-faith Practice for the Twenty-first Century”
- 2012: Cardinal Kurt Koch, Pontifical Commission for Religious Relations with the Jews “Nostra Aetate: 50 Years of Christian–Jewish Dialogue.”

Starting in 2013, the annual lecture was moved to the Centro Pro Unione:

- 2013: Prof. Moshe Idel, Hebrew University, Jerusalem “Judaism and the Problem of Evil”
- 2014: Rabbi Prof. Burton Visotzky, Jewish Theological Seminary, New York, "Sin and Atonement in the Rabbinic and Patristic Literature"
- 2015: Conference in collaboration with the US Embassy to the Holy See, “Women’s Leadership in Conflict Resolution”
- 2016: Conference in collaboration with the US Embassy to the Holy See, “Conflict Analysis and Dialogue Skill Building Training for Religious Actors Working in Conflict-Affected Settings”
- 2017: Rabbi Jack Bemporad, Center for Interreligious Understanding, “Monotheism and All That It Implies”
- 2018: Rabbi Jack Bemporad, Center for Interreligious Understanding, “The Philosophy of the Midrash”
- 2018: Prof. Marshall J. Breger, Catholic University of America, “The Place of the Land of Israel in Jewish Though”
- 2019: 10th anniversary celebration of the John Paul II Center for Interreligious Studies at the Angelicum, “Education for Action: The Urgency of Interreligious Leadership for the Global Good”
- 2019: Prof. Adam Afterman, Tel Aviv University, “The “Holy Spirit” in Medieval Jewish Philosophy and Spirituality”
- 2020: Prof. Menachem Lorberbaum, Tel Aviv University, “True Religion – Maimonides’ Legacy and Inter-religious Theology”
- 2020: Rabbi Jack Bemporad, Center for Interreligious Understanding, God, Science and Religion

=== Distinguished visiting professorships ===
Every year the John Paul II Center brought 2-3 distinguished visiting professors to Rome, particularly in the areas of Jewish studies and interreligious dialogue. The courses they offer are intensive, ranging from 1.5 ects 8-day courses, to 3.0 ects 15-day courses. The professors are chosen by the Center's Academic Committee. Recent visiting professors have included:

- Prof. Adam Afterman, Shalom Hartman Institute, Israel
- Rabbi Prof. Jack Bemporad, Center for Interreligious Understanding, New Jersey, United States
- Prof. Marshall Breger, The Catholic University of America, Washington, DC, United States
- Prof. Moshe Idel, Hebrew University, Israel
- Prof. Israel Knohl, Hebrew University, Israel
- Prof. Menachem Lorberbaum, Tel Aviv University, Israel
- Prof. Mona Siddiqui, University of Edinburgh, Scotland
- Prof. Josef Stern, University of Chicago, Illinois, United States

=== Certificate in interreligious studies ===
A postgraduate diploma, the Certificate in Interreligious Studies is offered through the Ecumenical Section of the Faculty of Theology at the Angelicum as an opportunity for students who do not qualify for regular admission to the STL program (usually because their education came from outside the pontifical system) to enroll as students in the field of Interreligious Studies, or as a post-doctoral or sabbatical year of study.

The focus of the certificate is on methodological issues in dealing with the philosophy, theology, and sociology of religion, and the teaching of the Catholic Church in relation to interreligious dialogue and other religions. In total, the Certificate represents 14 lecture courses and two seminars totaling 50 ects, plus the redaction of an integrative final paper worth 10 ects, for a total of 60 ects.

The program has four areas of study:

- Introduction and methodology (philosophy, hermeneutics, social sciences, anthropology of dialogue, method) 3 courses
- History (world religions, new religious movements) 2 courses
- Systematic (biblical themes, ecclesiology, theology/philosophy of religion, ethics) 8 courses
- Practical (spirituality/mysticism, ecumenical and interreligious commissions, catechesis) 1 course

== Notable alumni ==
- Prof. Paola Bernardini, Former Academic Dean, St. John Vianney College Seminary, Miami, FL, USA
- Most Rev. John Bogna Bakeni, Bishop of the Diocese of Maiduguri, Nigeria
- Prof. Andrew Boyd, Director of the KAICIID International Fellows Programme, Professor of Ecumenism and Interreligious Dialogue
- Elena Dini, Senior Program Manager, John Paul II Center for Interreligious Dialogue
- Dr. Taras Dzyubanskyy, Director, Libertas Interfaith Dialogue Center, Lviv, Ukraine
- Dr. Claudia Leal Luna, Professor at the John Paul II Institute for Marriage and Family, Consultor to the Pontifical Dicastery for the Doctrine of the Faith
- Rev. Ryan A. Muldoon, Director of the Office of Ecumenical and Interreligious Dialogue for the Archdiocese of New York
- Rev. Jan Nowotnik, National Ecumenical Officer, Catholic Bishops' Conference of England and Wales
- Sister Gracy Vadakara, Provincial of the Daughters of the Church in India, member of the Joint Working Group between the Catholic Church and the World Council of Churches
- Rabbi Allyson Zacharoff, Congregation Beth Hatikvah, Summit, NJ

== See also ==
- Michael L. Fitzgerald
- Pontifical Council for Interreligious Dialogue
