= Henchir-Tebel =

Town and archaeological site in Al Qayrawān, Tunisia

Coordinates: 35.3442°N 10.0514°E

Henchir-Tebel is a town and archaeological site in Al Qayrawān, Tunisia, near Kairouan

Henchir-Tebel is 118 metres above sea level. The town is in the tribal area of the Oulad Emmbarek el Achour, Oulad Haj en Nsir, and the Jehinat. and being close to Kairouan it is unsurprising that many notable Muslims are buried in the nearby area.

Although the Henchir-Tebel area had been settled by Berber, Phoenician and Greek communities, the town itself was founded by the Romans and they called it Luperciana. Luperciana flourished through Roman and Byzantine era and was part of the Roman Africa Proconsularis.

Luperciana has been tentatively identified with Henchir-Tebel or nearby ruins of Gasseur-Tatoun, Tunisia.

== Climate ==
Climate data for Henchir-Tebel
Month	Jan	Feb	Mar	Apr	May	Jun	Jul	Aug	Sep	Oct	Nov	Dec	Year
Record high °C (°F)	30.0 (86.0)	32.0 (89.6)	38.9 (102.0)	37.8 (100.0)	41.6 (106.9)	46.9 (116.4)	47.5 (117.5)	48.1 (118.6)	43.5 (110.3)	38.5 (101.3)	32.2 (90.0)	29.0 (84.2)	48.1 (118.6)
Mean daily maximum °C (°F)	16.9 (62.4)	18.3 (64.9)	20.2 (68.4)	23.3 (73.9)	28.3 (82.9)	32.9 (91.2)	36.8 (98.2)	36.3 (97.3)	31.9 (89.4)	26.5 (79.7)	21.6 (70.9)	17.8 (64.0)	25.9 (78.6)
Daily mean °C (°F)	11.5 (52.7)	12.6 (54.7)	14.2 (57.6)	16.9 (62.4)	21.0 (69.8)	25.4 (77.7)	28.5 (83.3)	28.7 (83.7)	25.4 (77.7)	20.8 (69.4)	15.9 (60.6)	12.5 (54.5)	19.4 (66.9)
Mean daily minimum °C (°F)	6.2 (43.2)	6.9 (44.4)	8.2 (46.8)	10.6 (51.1)	14.1 (57.4)	17.9 (64.2)	20.6 (69.1)	21.1 (70.0)	19.1 (66.4)	15.0 (59.0)	10.3 (50.5)	7.2 (45.0)	13.1 (55.6)
Record low °C (°F)	−4.2 (24.4)	−2.2 (28.0)	−2.3 (27.9)	1.6 (34.9)	5.0 (41.0)	6.5 (43.7)	13.4 (56.1)	13.3 (55.9)	11.8 (53.2)	5.5 (41.9)	0.8 (33.4)	−2.2 (28.0)	−4.2 (24.4)
Average precipitation mm (inches)	24.0 (0.94)	23.9 (0.94)	33.1 (1.30)	29.8 (1.17)	18.9 (0.74)	10.5 (0.41)	6.7 (0.26)	13.3 (0.52)	39.0 (1.54)	49.2 (1.94)	28.9 (1.14)	35.4 (1.39)	312.7 (12.31)
Average precipitation days	4	5	5	5	4	2	1	2	4	5	4	4	45
Average relative humidity (%)	64	62	62	61	58	53	49	53	59	65	65	65	60
Mean monthly sunshine hours	186.0	190.4	226.3	252.0	300.7	324.0	362.7	334.8	270.0	235.6	207.0	186.0	3,075.5
Mean daily sunshine hours	6.0	6.8	7.3	8.4	9.7	10.8	11.7	10.8	9.0	7.6	6.9	6.0	8.4
Source: NOAA

== Religion ==
=== Islam ===
Islam as the official state religion is the dominant religion in Henchir Tebel. The nearby city of Kairouan is considered an Islamic Holy city.

=== Judaism ===
There was a Jewish community in the Kairouan region during the Early Middle Ages and was considered a center of Talmudic learning.

=== Christianity (Catholic) ===
The Roman town of Luperciana, was the seat of an ancient episcopal see of the Roman province of Africa Proconsularis, suffragan of the Archdiocese of Carthage. It is thought Luperciana correspond to Henchir-Tebel, or the ruins of Gasseur-Tatoun. The only bishop known from antiquity is Pelagian, who took part in the Council of Carthage (256) which was called by St. Cyprian to discuss the question of the Lapsi .

The bishopric effectively ceased to function with the arrival of Islam in the 7th century, but was re-established, under the French, in 1933 as a titular see of the Roman Catholic Church.

- Michael A. Saporito (current bishop)
- Miguel Ángel Ayuso Guixot (2016.01.29 – 2019.10.05)
- João Evangelista Pimentel Lavrador (2008.05.07 – 2015.09.29)
- Leonardus Dobbelaar (1994.06.10 – 2008.03.21)
- Zithulele Patrick Mvemve (1986.03.10 – 1994.03.26)
- Thomas Nkuissi (1973.01.29 – 1978.11.15)
- Albert Vincent D’Souza (1969.05.29 – 1971.01.11)
- Martin Legarra Tellechea (1965.03.18 – 1969.04.03)
- Pelagian of Luperciana (fl. 256 )

=== Christianity (Donatist) ===
Luperciana was centered in the heartland of the Donatist movement of the 4th century and during the Vandal Kingdom the official religion would have been Arianism.
