= Jorge María Mejía =

Argentine cardinal

His Eminence Jorge María Mejía
- Archivist of the Vatican Secret Archives
- Cardinal Meijia
- Appointed: 7 March 1998
- Term ended: October 2003
- Predecessor: Luigi Poggi
- Successor: Jean-Louis Pierre Tauran
- Other post: Cardinal-Priest of San Girolamo della Carità
- Previous posts: Titular Bishop of Apollonia (1986–1994); Vice President of the Pontifical Commission of Justice and Peace (1986–1994); Titular Archbishop of Apollonia (1994–2001); Secretary of the Congregation for Bishops (1994–1998); Secretary of the College of Cardinals (1994–1998); Librarian of the Vatican Library (1998–2003)

Orders
- Ordination: 22 September 1945
- Consecration: 12 April 1986 by Roger Marie Élie Etchegaray
- Created cardinal: 21 February 2001 by Pope John Paul II
- Rank: Cardinal-Priest

Personal details
- Born: 31 January 1923 Buenos Aires, Argentina
- Died: 9 December 2014 (aged 91) Rome, Italy
- Denomination: Roman Catholic
- Motto: Ipse est pax nostra ("He is our peace")
- Coat of arms

Styles of Jorge Mejía
- Reference style: His Eminence
- Spoken style: Your Eminence
- Religious style: Cardinal
- Posthumous style: not applicable
- Informal style: Cardinal

Jorge María Mejía (31 January 1923 – 9 December 2014) was an Argentine cardinal of the Catholic Church (Roman Rite).

== Early life and ordination ==
Mejía was born in Buenos Aires, Argentina, and ordained to the priesthood for the Metropolitan See of Buenos Aires on 22 September 1945. He taught Sacred Scripture at several universities, participated at the Second Vatican Council as a peritus and was made a Chaplain of His Holiness on 20 September 1978. He held a doctorate in theology from the Pontifical University of St. Thomas Aquinas (Angelicum) and a license in biblical science from the Pontifical Biblical Institute.

== Bishop ==
On 8 March 1986, Mejía was appointed as titular bishop of Apollonia and an official of the Curial Pontifical Council for Justice and Peace. His episcopal consecration took place on 12 April 1986 and was performed by Cardinal Roger Etchegaray with Archbishop Eduardo Martínez Somalo and Bishop Antonio María Javierre Ortas as co-consecrators. On 5 March 1994, Mejía was named Secretary of the Congregation for Bishops and raised to the rank of Archbishop. Five days later, on 10 March 1994, he was appointed Secretary of the College of Cardinals. On 7 March 1998, he became both the archivist and the librarian of the Vatican Secret Archives.

== Cardinal ==
On 21 February 2001 Mejía was appointed as Cardinal-Deacon of San Girolamo della Carità by Pope John Paul II in the consistory. On 24 November 2003, he retired as archivist and librarian of the Vatican Secret Archives. On 21 February 2011 he opted for the order of Cardinal Priest with his former diaconal church elevated to the level of cardinalitial title.

Mejía was 82 at the time of the 2005 papal conclave that elected Pope Benedict XVI and thus was not eligible to vote. In January 2010 Mejía led the delegation from the Holy See's Pontifical Commission for Religious Relations with the Jews meeting for the Commission for Dialogue between Jews and Catholics, the ninth such meeting. From 2013 until his death the following year he sat on the Board of World Religious Leaders for the interfaith dialogue-based organization, the Elijah Interfaith Institute. On 13 March 2013 Mejía suffered a heart attack on the same day his fellow Argentine Cardinal Jorge Mario Bergoglio was elected as Pope Francis, the 266th pontiff of the Catholic Church. Mejía died in Rome on 9 December 2014 after battling stomach cancer, at the age of 91.

Catholic Church titles
Preceded by Vincenzo Cirrincione	— TITULAR — Archbishop of Apollonia; 8 March 1986 – 21 February 2001	Succeeded by Gilberto Jiménez Narváez
Preceded by Justin Francis Rigali	Secretary of the Congregation for Bishops; 5 March 1994 – 7 March 1998	Succeeded by Francesco Monterisi
Preceded by Justin Francis Rigali	Secretary of the College of Cardinals; 10 March 1994 – 7 March 1998	Succeeded by Francesco Monterisi
Preceded by Luigi Poggi	Librarian of the Holy Roman Church; 7 March 1998 – 24 November 2003	Succeeded by Jean-Louis Tauran
Preceded by Luigi Poggi	Archivist of the Holy Roman Church; 7 March 1998 – 24 November 2003	Succeeded by Jean-Louis Tauran
Preceded by Pietro Palazzini	— TITULAR — Cardinal-Deacon of San Girolamo della Carità; 21 February 2001 – 9 December 2014	Succeeded by Miguel Ángel Ayuso Guixot
