= Apostolic Delegation to the Arab League =

Diplomatic Mission of the Holy See

The Apostolic Delegation to the Arab League is an ecclesiastical office of the Catholic Church. It is a diplomatic post of the Holy See, whose representative is called the Apostolic Delegate. He represents the Holy See as an accredited non-member of the Arab League, formally known as the League of Arab States. The title Apostolic Delegate to the Arab League is held by the prelate appointed Apostolic Nuncio to Egypt; he resides in Cairo.

== Papal representatives to the Arab League ==
- Paolo Giglio (8 February 2000 – 5 February 2002)
- Marco Dino Brogi (5 February 2002 (Note: Both the Holy See Press Office and the annual Acta Apostolicae Sedis reported Brogi's appointment to Egypt with mentioning the Arab League, while a contemporary report assumes that appointment. When Brogi met with Pope John Paul II on 29 November 2003, the official announcement identified him as Apostolic Nuncio to Egypt and Delegate to the Arab League.) – 27 January 2006)
- Michael Louis Fitzgerald (15 February 2006 – October 2012)
- Jean-Paul Gobel (5 January 2013 – 5 February 2015)
- Bruno Musarò (5 February 2015 – 29 August 2019)
- Nicolas Thévenin (4 November 2019 – present)
