= Torquato Dini =

Torquato Dini (27 June 1893 – 26 March 1934) was an Italian prelate of the Catholic Church who led the Pontifical Urban University for a decade. He was appointed the pope's representative to a group of countries in the Middle East and Africa but died just as he was taking up that assignment.

== Biography ==
Torquato Dini was born on 27 June 1893 in Sant'Angelo in Vado, Italy.

He was Rector of the Pontifical Urban University, the educational arm of the Congregation for the Propagation of the Faith, from 1925 to 1934.

On 12 November 1933, Pope Pius XI appointed him titular archbishop of Dara and Apostolic Delegate to Egypt, Arabia, Crete, Ethiopia, Palaestine, Trans-Jordan and Cyprus. He received his episcopal consecration on 6 January.

He died unexpectedly in Cairo at the age of 40 on 26 March 1934, fourteen days after arriving there.
