= Sergio Pignedoli =

Italian cardinal (1910–1980)

His Eminence Sergio Pignedoli
- President of the Secretariat of Non-Christians
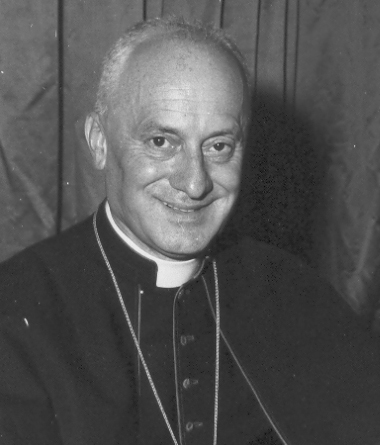
- The then-archbishop pictured in September 1967.
- Church: Roman Catholic Church
- Appointed: 6 March 1973
- Term ended: 15 June 1980
- Predecessor: Paolo Marella
- Successor: Francis Arinze
- Other posts: Cardinal-Deacon of San Giorgio in Velabro (1973–80); Cardinal Protodeacon (1979–80)
- Previous posts: Apostolic Nuncio to Bolivia (1950–54); Titular Archbishop of Iconium (1950–73); Apostolic Nuncio to Venezuela (1954–55); Auxiliary Bishop of Milan (1955–64); Apostolic Delegate to Central Western Africa (1960–64); Apostolic Delegate to Canada (1964–67); Secretary of the Congregation for the Evangelization of Peoples (1967–73)

Orders
- Ordination: 1 April 1933
- Consecration: 11 February 1951 by Adeodato Giovanni Piazza
- Created cardinal: 5 March 1973 by Pope Paul VI
- Rank: Cardinal-Deacon

Personal details
- Born: Sergio Pignedoli; 4 June 1910 Felina di Reggio Emilia, Kingdom of Italy
- Died: 15 June 1980 (aged 70) Reggio Emilia, Italy
- Parents: Omero Pignedoli; Emma Peretti
- Education: Università Cattolica del Sacro Cuore; Pontifical Lateran University; Pontifical Gregorian University
- Motto: Virtus ex alto
- Coat of arms

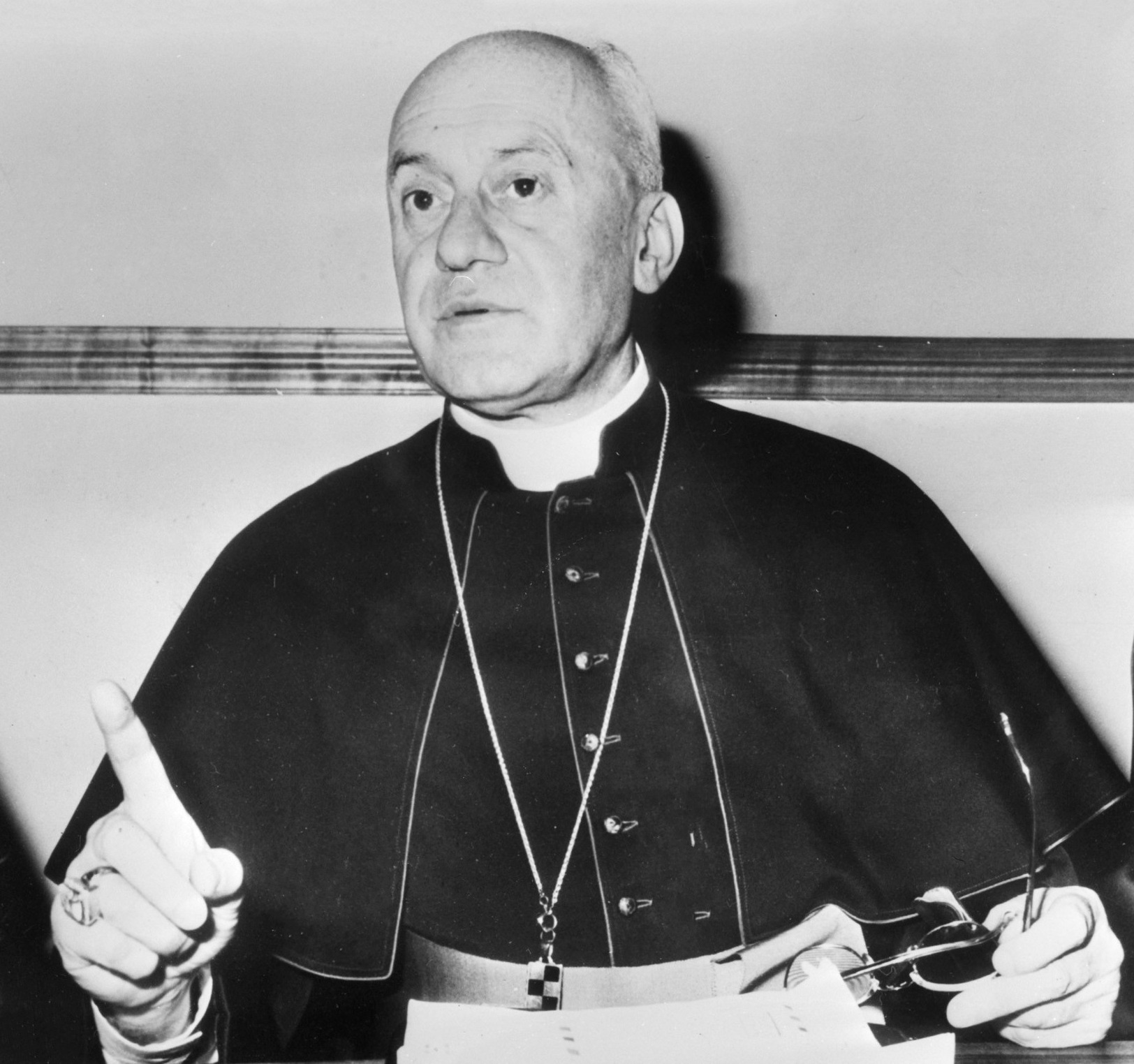
Sergio Pignedoli pictured in 1978.

Sergio Pignedoli (4 June 1910 – 15 June 1980) was a prominent Italian Cardinal of the Roman Catholic Church and a top candidate for pope. He served as auxiliary bishop to Pope Paul VI when he was archbishop of Milan, and as President of the Secretariat for Non-Christians from 1973 to 1980. He was elevated to the cardinalate in 1973.

In his capacity of cardinal, Pignedoli was one of the electors in the conclaves of August and October 1978, which selected Pope John Paul I and Pope John Paul II respectively. He was considered by many as a papabile in both of those conclaves.

== Biography ==
=== Early life and priestly ministry ===
Born in Felina di Reggio Emilia, Sergio Pignedoli studied at the seminary in Reggio Emilia, the Catholic University of Milan (where he received a doctorate in ancient studies), the Pontifical Lateran University (obtaining a doctorate in theology), and the Pontifical Gregorian University (master's in ecclesiastical history) before being ordained a priest on 1 April 1933. He then served as vice-rector of the seminary in Reggio Emilia until 1934, at which time he became a chaplain at the Catholic University of Milan. During World War II, from 1940 to 1943, Pignedoli served as a navy chaplain, and continued his work as a chaplain in Azione Cattolica and the Italian Boy Scouts. Named Monsignor on 5 September 1949, he was also the Secretary of the Central Committee for the 1950 Holy Year, on which he commented, "This year's great discovery is that in a world apparently skeptical and indifferent, there's a vigorous current of faith".

=== Episcopal ministry ===
On 22 December 1950, he was appointed Titular Archbishop of Iconium and Nuncio to Bolivia. Pignedoli received episcopal consecration on 11 February 1951 from Cardinal Adeodato Giovanni Piazza, OCD, with Archbishop Valerio Valeri and Bishop Beniamino Socche serving as co-consecrators, in the Basilica of Saint Paul Outside the Walls. After serving as Nuncio to Bolivia for four years, he was named Nuncio to Venezuela on 19 October 1954. On 15 April 1955, he was named Auxiliary Bishop of Milan, where he remained until 23 September 1960; during his time in Milan, Pignedoli established a deep friendship with Giovanni Battista Montini that continued into the latter's rise to the papacy. From 1960 until 1967, he held the positions of Apostolic Delegate to Western and Central Africa (1960-1964) and to Canada (1964-1967). Pignedoli also attended the Second Vatican Council (1962-1965).

Pope Paul VI appointed Pignedoli as Secretary of the Congregation for the Evangelization of Peoples on 10 June 1967. He was created Cardinal-Deacon of S. Giorgio al Velabro by Paul VI in the consistory of 5 March 1973. On the following day, 6 March, he became the second President of the Secretariat for Non-Christians (later renamed the Pontifical Council for Interreligious Dialogue by Pope John Paul II on 28 June 1988).

On 24 May 1974, before his trip to West Africa, Cardinal Pignedoli joined by Monsignor Verrazano, met with A. C. Bhaktivedanta Swami Prabhupada. Together they had an hour-long dialogue about social analysis and outreach ministry. That same year, he wrote a letter to Benedictine Abbot Primate Rembert Weakland, in which he asked the monastic orders to take up a leading role in interreligious dialogue as the presence of monasticism in various religions provided an important bridge for this dialogue. This was the impetus for the later creation of the DIMMID (Dialogue Interreligieux Monastique - Monastic Interreligious Dialogue).

Pignedoli also established close friendships with Shōchō Hagami, a great acharya of Tendai Buddhism and one of the most prominent Japanese Buddhists of the 20th century, who played a leading role in promoting mutual respect and reconciliation among three monotheistic religions from an Asian side.

A towering figure in the Roman Catholic Church, Cardinal Sergio Pignedoli was Pope Paul VI's closest ally and confidant, and was widely expected to succeed him. Following the death of Paul VI in 1978, Pignedoli was the leading contender to be elected pope. He was featured in numerous publications around the world, including on the covers of Time and Newsweek. In the August 1978 conclave, Pignedoli, the progressive candidate, received nearly half of the votes of the cardinal electors. His main opponent was the conservative cardinal Giuseppe Siri of Genova, though since both of these legendary cardinals were unable to obtain a majority, a compromise candidate emerged, and Albino Luciani was elected as Pope John Paul I. Thirty three days later, following the sudden death of John Paul I, a second conclave convened in October 1978. Pignedoli was again the leading contender for the papacy, but ultimately Karol Józef Wojtyła of Poland was elected as Pope John Paul II.

Pignedoli died from a pulmonary embolism during a visit to his native Reggio Emilia, at age 70.

== Trivia ==
- During the conclave of August 1978, Pignedoli sat to the right of the altar in the Sistine Chapel.
- Fluent in English and his native Italian, he claimed to have dreamed in French.

== See also ==
Catholic Church titles
Preceded by Paolo Marella	President of the Pontifical Council for Interreligious Dialogue; 6 March 1973 – 15 June 1980	Succeeded by Jean Jadot
Preceded by Pericle Felici	Cardinal Protodeacon; 30 June 1979 – 15 June 1980	Succeeded by Umberto Mozzoni
