= Commission for Religious Relations with Muslims =

- Coat of arms of the Holy See

Commission overview
- Formed: 1974; 52 years ago
- Type: Commission
- Headquarters: Via della Conciliazione 5 00193 Rome, Italy
- Commission executives: Cardinal George Koovakad, Prefect; Msgr. Indunil Janakaratne Kodithuwakku Kankanamalage, Vice-Prefect; Fr. Laurent Basanese SJ, Secretary

The Commission for Religious Relations with Muslims is a body within the Roman Curia tasked with maintaining positive theological ties with Muslims, established in 1974 by Pope Paul VI. It is a distinct unit set within the Dicastery for Interreligious Dialogue, and the Prefect of the dicastery is also Prefect of the commission, currently held by Cardinal George Koovakad. The Secretary of the dicastery serves as the vice-prefect for the commission currently held by Msgr. Indunil Janakaratne Kodithuwakku Kankanamalage, who has held this position since 2019.

The Secretary of the Commission for Religious Relations with Muslims, who heads the office was Msgr. Khaled Akasheh, who was appointed on 16 June 2003 and held office until 2024. The current Secretary of the Commission is Fr. Laurent Basanese SJ, who was appointed on 1st June 2025, and who also serves as the bureau chief of the dicastery.

The commission has its own consultors, who are appointed by the pope.

- Fr. Heru Parkosa, SJ - a Jesuit priest, counsellor for Dialogue with Islam of the Society of Jesus, professor in the theology department of Sanata Dharma University, Indonesia
- Fr. Amir Jaje, OP - a Dominican priest and secretary of the Episcopal Commission for Inter-religious Dialogue of the Assembly of Catholic Bishops of Iraq.
- Fr. Joseph Olawale Ogundipe - priest, chaplain of St. Thomas Moore Catholic Chaplaincy, Ladoke Akintola University of Technology, and director of the Ecumenical and Interreligious Dialogue Commission for the Diocese of Oyo, Nigeria.
- Dr. Martino Diez - scientific director of the Oasis International Foundation, and associate professor of Arabic language and literature at the Catholic University of Milan, Italy
- Dr. Timo Guzelmansur - general director of CIBEDO (Christian-Islamic Encounter and Documentation Centre), Germany. (Turkey)
- Dr. Gabriel Said Reynolds - Crowley professor of Islamic studies and theology at Notre Dame, USA (United States)
- Dr. Ian Netton - vice director of Arab and Islamic studies at the University of Exeter, UK and professor of Islamic studies at Sharjah, UAE. (United Kingdom) (United Arab Emirates)
- Fr. Patrick McInerney, a Columban father, appointed by Pope Leo XIV on 10 September 2025.

== See also ==
- Christianity and Islam
- Interfaith dialogue
- Islam and other religions
- John Paul II Center for Interreligious Dialogue
- Muhammad's views on Christians
- Chrislam
