= Dicastery for Interreligious Dialogue =

Dicastery of the Roman Curia

- Coat of arms of the Holy See

Dicastery overview
- Formed: 19 May 1964; 62 years ago
- Type: Dicastery
- Headquarters: Via della Conciliazione 5 00193 Rome, Italy
- Dicastery executives: Cardinal George Koovakad, Prefect; Msgr. Indunil Janakaratne Kodithuwakku Kankanamalage, Secretary; Fr. Paulin Batairwa Kubuya SX, Under-secretary; Fr. Laurent Basanese SJ, Bureau Chief

The Dicastery for Interreligious Dialogue, previously named the Pontifical Council for Interreligious Dialogue (PCID), is a dicastery of the Roman Curia, erected by Pope Paul VI on 19 May 1964 as the Secretariat for Non-Christians, and renamed by Pope John Paul II on 28 June 1988.

The Dicastery does not have responsibility for relations with other Christian religions, which are the responsibility of the Dicastery for Promoting Christian Unity, which also has oversight of the Commission for Religious Relations with the Jews.

== Mission ==
The Dicastery is the central office of the Catholic Church for promoting interreligious dialogue in accordance with the spirit of the Second Vatican Council, in particular the declaration Nostra aetate. It has the following responsibilities:

1. to promote mutual understanding, respect and collaboration between Catholics and the followers of other religious traditions;
2. to encourage the study of religions;
3. to promote the formation of persons dedicated to dialogue.

While the Dicastery is responsible for the promotion of inter-religious dialogue, it does not cover Christian-Jewish relations. This is the responsibility of the entirely separate Pontifical Commission of the Holy See for Religious Relations with the Jews, which reports to the Dicastery for Promoting Christian Unity, and is headed by the prefect of that dicastery, Cardinal Kurt Koch.

The Dicastery for Interreligious Dialogue is the central hub for dialogue in the Catholic Church. However, dialogue is often carried out at the local level by individual churches, many of which are supported by regional or national dialogue commissions. The PCID works closely to support these commissions and encourages their formation in areas where they do not yet exist.

The Dicastery is restricted to matters of religion and interreligious dialogue. It does not address social or economic issues, which are covered by other departments in the Roman Curia.

The Commission for Religious Relations with Muslims is part of the Dicastery for Interreligious Dialogue. (Note: "The PCID has a special commission for relations with Muslims.") The Commission's place within the Council’s structure reflects a degree of independence. The Council's president is ex officio president of the Muslim Commission, but the Commission has its own secretary and its own group of eight consultors.

== Current activities ==
The Dicastery undertakes a range of activities that support its work of promoting mutual understanding between Catholicism and other religions. It welcomes visitors to Rome, visits others, runs meetings and participates in many more. It publishes a bulletin called Pro dialogo three times a year, containing "significant Church texts on dialogue, articles, and news of dialogue activities throughout the world" as well as an Interreligious Dialogue Directory.

== Creation and later reorganization ==
The council was created on 19 May 1964 as the Secretariat for Non-Christians by Pope Paul VI with his apostolic letter Progrediente Concilio. It was renamed the Council for Interreligious Dialogue by Pope John Paul II on 12 June 1988.

On 11 March 2006, Pope Benedict XVI altered the status of that Pontifical Council by combining the Council's presidency with that of the Pontifical Council for Culture, then led by Cardinal Paul Poupard, who shared Benedict's sceptical view of interreligious discussions. This organizational change reflected Benedict's view of the nature of dialogue with non-Christians, which he thought could not be theological and needed to focus on shared values, questions not of doctrine but culture. In the tense atmosphere of Catholic-Muslim relations at the time, just months after Benedict’s Regensburg address was met with outraged reactions in the Muslim community, Benedict's organizational move was seen as "downgrading" the significance of Catholic-Muslim relations. After some criticism, Benedict restored the independence of the Pontifical Council distinct from the Council for Culture, separating the presidencies once again and appointing Cardinal Jean-Louis Tauran President of the Pontifical Council for Interreligious Dialogue on 25 June 2007, effective 1 September 2007. (Note: The Vatican, atypically, announced the restoration of the independence of the Council on Interreligious Dialogue a month in advance of the official change, through a statement by the Secretary of State Cardinal Tarcisio Bertone in late May 2007.)

== Structure ==
The Dicastery consists of a decision-making body, an advisory body and an executive body.

=== Decision-making body ===
The Members of the Council are the Dicastery’s decision-making body. Around 30 in number, members include Cardinals and Bishops from around the world. Every two or three years, a Plenary Assembly is convened to discuss important issues and to set guidelines for the work of the Council.

=== Advisory body ===
The Dicastery has an advisory body of around 50 advisors, called Consultors, who provide research, advice and information to the Council. The Consultors are specialists in religious studies or in the practice of inter-religious dialogue, hailing from all corners of the world.

=== Executive body ===
The Dicastery’s executive body comprises the President, Secretary, Under-Secretary, bureau chief for Islam, staff members for Africa and Asia, a staff member for new religious movements, as well as administrative and support staff.

Presidents (before March 2022) / Prefects (since March 2022):

- Cardinal Paolo Marella (1964–1973)
- Cardinal Sergio Pignedoli (1973–1980)
- Archbishop Jean Jadot (1980–1984)
- Cardinal Francis Arinze (1984–2002)
- Cardinal Michael Fitzgerald, M. Afr. (2002–2006)
- Cardinal Paul Poupard (2006–2007)
- Cardinal Jean-Louis Tauran (2007–2018)
- Cardinal Miguel Ángel Ayuso Guixot, M.C.C.J. (2019–2024)
- Cardinal George Koovakad (2025–present)

The Secretary of the Dicastery since 3 July 2019 has been Fr. Indunil Janakaratne Kodithuwakku Kankanamalage. He was previously Undersecretary for seven years. A Sri Lankan, he has taught at the missiology faculty of the Pontifical Urban University. The Under Secretary is Paulin Batairwa Kubuya, S.X. appointed 11 November 2019; he taught at Fu Jen Catholic University and was executive secretary of the commission for interreligious and ecumenical dialogue of the Regional Episcopal Conference of Taiwan. (Note: "Batairwa Kubuya, Paulin, SX is a Xaverian priest from Congo (Kinshasa). He obtained his MA in Theological Studies at Maryhill School of Theology (Quezon City) and has been in Taiwan for seven years [as of 2008]. He is based at the Tien Educational Center, Office for Interreligious Dialogue and Cooperation. He is doing his doctoral studies at the Department of Religious Studies of Fu Jen Catholic University in Taipei.")

== See also ==
- John Paul II Center for Interreligious Dialogue
- Pontifical Council
- Studia Linguarum
- Pontifical Council for Dialogue with Non-Believers
