= Arthur Hughes (bishop) =

British prelate of the Catholic Church (1902-1949)

Arthur Walter Hughes, M.Afr. (25 August 1902 – 12 July 1949) was a British prelate of the Catholic Church who led the Pontifical Urban University for a decade. He was appointed the pope's representative to a group of missionary countries but died just as he was taking up that assignment.

== Biography ==
Arthur Hughes was born on 25 August 1902 in the Clapton neighborhood of London, to parents who had immigrated from Ireland and Wales. He was raised without religion and chose to be a Catholic after leaving school at age 14 and studying independently. He was sent to study at the minor seminary of the Missionaries of Africa in Bishop's Waltham and then in Carthage. He was ordained a priest of that order on 28 June 1927. He taught briefly in Bishop's Waltham and then led a parish in West London while preaching throughout the United Kingdom.

His first missionary posting was in Uganda where he worked in education from 1933 to 1942. Then he arrived in British-occupied Egypt as a welcome alternative to the apostolic delegate there who was Italian, but he maintained his independence from his countrymen. He functioned as papal representative though he lacked the title. He attended to prisoners of war and occupying troops evenhandedly. And he focused on establishing cordial relations with the various Christian and non-Christian communities.

On 3 March 1945, Pope Pius XII appointed him titular archbishop of Hieropolis and Apostolic Delegate to Egypt.

Egypt then worked toward establishing full diplomatic relations with the Holy See, the first Muslim state to do so. On 23 August 1947, Pope Pius XII appointed him titular archbishop of Aprus and Apostolic Internuncio to Egypt.

He died on a visit to his family in England on 12 July 1949 at the age of 46.
