= Marco Dino Brogi =

Italian priest (1932–2020)

Marco Dino Brogi, O.F.M. (12 March 1932 – 29 November 2020) was an Italian prelate of the Catholic Church who worked in the Roman Curia and in diplomatic service of the Holy See.

== Biography ==
Brogi was born in Egypt and was a Latin-rite Catholic. He was ordained a priest on 5 May 1963.

He was working as undersecretary in the Congregation for the Oriental Churches, when Pope John Paul II named Brogi titular archbishop of Città Ducale, Apostolic Nuncio to Sudan, and Apostolic Delegate to Somalia on 13 December 1997.

John Paul named him Apostolic Nuncio to Egypt and Apostolic Delegate to the Arab League on 5 February 2002. (Note: Both the Holy See Press Office and the annual Acta Apostolicae Sedis reported Brogi's appointment to Egypt with mentioning the Arab League, while a contemporary report assumes that appointment. When Brogi met with Pope John Paul II on 29 November 2003, the official announcement identified him as Apostolic Nuncio to Egypt and Delegate to the Arab League.)

Brogi ended his service as Nuncio on 27 January 2006 when he was named a Consultor with the Secretariat of State by Pope Benedict XVI. Benedict named him a Consultor to the Congregation for the Oriental Churches as well on 15 September 2007.

He died from COVID-19 in Florence on 29 November 2020, at age 88, amidst the COVID-19 pandemic in Italy.
