= Chethipuzha =

- village
- Location in Kerala, India Chethipuzha (India)
- Coordinates: 9°28′0″N 76°36′0″E
- Country: India
- State: Kerala
- District: Kottayam

Population (2011)
  - Total: 25,145

Languages
  - Official: Malayalam, English
- Time zone: UTC+5:30 (IST)
- Vehicle registration: KL-33

Chethipuzha is in Changanassery, in Kottayam district, Kerala, India. Chethipuzha is home to many prominent educational and healthcare institutions, including Placid Vidya Vihar, Kristu Jyothi School, and the St. Thomas Hospital, Chethipuzha.

== Demographics ==
Historical population
Year	Pop.	±%
2001	24,842	—
2011	25,145	+1.2%

As per the 2011 Indian census, Chethipuzha has a total population of 25,145 and a population density of 2,470 inhabitants per square kilometre (6,400/sq mi). Of this, 12,128 are male and 13,017 are female. 8.69% of the population is under 6 years of age. Scheduled Castes and Scheduled Tribes constitute 5.28% and 0.14% of the population respectively. The total literacy rate was 97.73% (98.24% for males and 97.26% for females), which is higher than the state average of 94% and the national average of 74.04%.

=== Religion ===
Religion in Chethipuzha (2011)
1. Hinduism (69.2%)
2. Christianity (29.4%)
3. Islam (0.71%)
4. None (0.60%)
5. Other (0.04%)

According to the 2011 census, Hindus are the majority with 69% of the population adhering to the religion. Christians form a significant minority, constituting 29% of the population. Muslims constitute 0.71% of the population.
