= Giuseppe Girotti =

Italian Roman Catholic priest (1905–1945)

Blessed Giuseppe Girotti OP
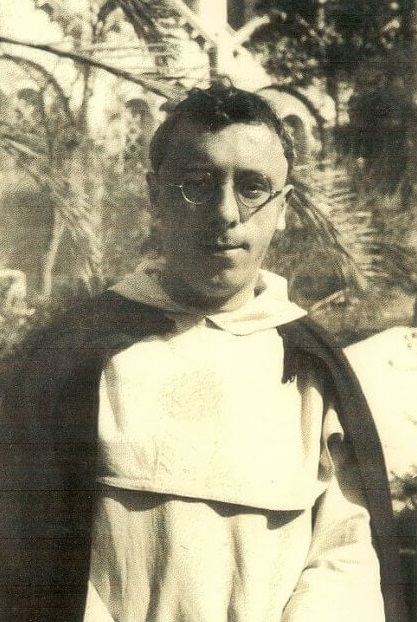

Martyr
- Born: 19 July 1905; Alba, Cuneo, Kingdom of Italy
- Died: 1 April 1945 (aged 39); Dachau Concentration Camp, Nazi Germany
- Venerated in: Catholic Church
- Beatified: 26 April 2014, Alba Cathedral, Cuneo, Italy by Cardinal Severino Poletto (on behalf of Pope Francis)
- Feast: 1 April

Giuseppe Girotti, OP (19 July 1905 – 1 April 1945) was an Italian Dominican priest who was a biblical scholar and a professor of theology. During World War II, he worked to aid Jewish people amid the Nazi Holocaust. Girotti was arrested in 1944 and moved from prison to prison before being imprisoned at the Dachau concentration camp, where he befriended Josef Beran and Carlo Manziana.

Girotti was beatified on 26 April 2014 in Alba Cathedral after Pope Francis confirmed he had died as a martyr of the faith. Cardinal Severino Poletto celebrated the solemn Mass on the pope's behalf.

== Life ==
Giuseppe Girotti was born on 19 July 1905 in Alba in the Province of Cuneo as the eldest of three children to Celso Girotti (born 1875) and Martina Proetto; his siblings that followed him were Giovanni and Michele. Girotti was baptized on 30 July. He began his studies in October 1911 and from 1911 to 1913 was under the ward of the teacher Ferrio. He received both his First Communion and Confirmation on 9 May 1912 from Bishop Giuseppe Re.

In the summer of 1918 he witnessed a priest of the Order of Preachers give a sermon in Alba Cathedral and Girotti became enthralled to the point where he set his heart on becoming a priest himself. He approached the priest and expressed his desire to join; the priest convinced and encouraged him to follow this call as one from God. He began his studies for the priesthood in Chieri at a Dominican convent when he entered on 5 January 1919 and remained there for his education until 1922. On 26 September 1922, he was dispatched to Santa Maria della Quercia convent in Viterbo to continue his studies but spent a brief period of time in Fiesole. It was on 30 September 1922 that he was vested in the order's signature white habit.

On 15 October 1923, he made his profession into his order at Viterbo. Girotti received his ordination to the priesthood on 3 August 1930 in Chieri from the Bishop of Vigevano Giacinto Scapardini and he – after ordination – studied Sacred Scripture at the Angelicum in Rome and at the École Biblique in Jerusalem under the guidance of the Marie-Joseph Lagrange. In June 1942 he published his scholar's work on the Book of Isaiah after having issued one on the Book of Wisdom back in 1938. In 1934 he had also published his academic work entitled "Prolita in Sacra Scriptura".

He worked as a professor at theological studies at the Saint Maria delle Rose convent of his order in Turin but liked to often aid the old at a hospice not too far from his convent; one of his students was Father Giacinto Bosco. His time at the convent drew to a close in 1938, for he was sent to the San Domenico convent in Turin. He became an opponent of the Italian Fascist regime of Benito Mussolini. Following the Nazi occupation of the Italian nation in 1943 he saved Jewish people from the brutal Nazi Holocaust through the arrangement of safe hideouts and escape routes from the country as well as false identification papers. He often called the Jews the "Carriers of the Word of God" and the "elder brothers". His time in Jerusalem allowed him to strengthen interfaith ties with Judaism and Jewish culture which served invaluable for him and his mission. Girotti also aided Emma De Benedetti and her parents. He had known Emma before the war since her parents lived near him in Alba. He helped Emma and her mother find refuge for several months in a Turin convent, and provided false identification papers to her father. He also aided the barrister Salvatore Fubini from Turin.

Having been caught in the act of helping a wounded Jewish partisan to the home of Professor Joseph Diena, Girotti was arrested on 29 August 1944. It emerged that a spy, disguised as a person needing his help, was taken to Villa Cavorette where the priest had hidden Diena. This individual reported Girotti then to the authorities and he was arrested and taken first to the Le Nuove prison in Turin where an attempt by his Dominican superior to secure his release did not succeed. Girotti was moved to the San Vittore prison in Milan before being moved to the camp at Gries in Bolzano on 21 September 1944, where he met the priest Angelo Dalmasso. Girotti was then sent to the Dachau concentration camp on the night of 9 October 1944 and branded with the inmate number 113355. He was imprisoned with a thousand other priests in Cabin 26, a space designed for 180 inmates. It was there that he became close friends with Josef Beran and Carlo Manziana, who were later both to become bishops.

On 1 March 1945, Girotti started to suffer from rheumatic pain and swelling in his legs, and this worsened two weeks later when the swelling spread to his entire right side. He was taken to a medical center within the prison and was diagnosed with probable carcinoma. From 23 March to 1 April he remained in the medical center and on Easter – 1 April – he was "probably" killed with a lethal injection of gasoline. His remains were buried in a mass grave three kilometers from the camp. An fellow inmate wrote on the bunk that Girotti had occupied, saying: "Here slept Saint Giuseppe Girotti".

=== Yad Vashem recognition ===
On 14 February 1995, the Yad Vashem organization declared Giuseppe Girotti to be Righteous Among the Nations. A tree was planted in his honor in Jerusalem along the Avenue of the Righteous.

== Beatification ==
The route to beatification process began with the diocesan process opened by Cardinal Anastasio Ballestrero in Turin on 20 March 1988 and closed under Archbishop Giovanni Saldarini on 20 January 1990. The formal introduction to the Roman phase of the cause came under Pope John Paul II on 13 January 1989 and Giuseppe Girotti was given the title Servant of God.

A panel of theologians asserted on 20 January 2012 their belief that Girotti was killed for his faith, while the Congregation came to the same conclusion on 5 February 2013; Pope Francis confirmed on 27 March 2013 that Girotti was killed "in odium fidei" ("in hatred of the faith") and thus opened the way to his beatification. On the pope's behalf Cardinal Severino Poletto, Archbishop of Turin, presided over the beatification at a solemn Mass in Alba Cathedral on 26 April 2014.

The current postulator for this cause is the Dominican priest Vito Tomás Gómez García.

== See also ==
- Priest Barracks of Dachau Concentration Camp
- Catholic resistance to Nazi Germany
- Rescue of Jews by Catholics during the Holocaust
