= Alba Cathedral =

Romanesque cathedral in Alba, Piedmont, Italy

Alba Cathedral Italian: Cattedrale di San Lorenzo; Duomo di Alba
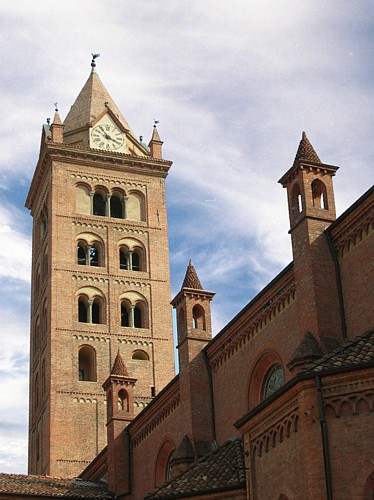
- North side of the cathedral, with the 13th-century Lombardo-Gothic campanile

Religion
- Affiliation: Roman Catholic
- Ecclesiastical or organizational status: Cathedral

Location
- Location: Via Vida, 1 Alba, Piedmont, Italy
- Interactive map of Alba Cathedral; Italian: Cattedrale di San Lorenzo; Duomo di Alba
- Coordinates: 44.700°N 8.036°E

Architecture
- Style: Romanesque original, overlaid by Lombardo-Gothic and extensive 19th-century reconstructions
- Materials: Red brick

Alba Cathedral (Italian: Cattedrale di San Lorenzo; Duomo di Alba) is a Roman Catholic cathedral in Alba, province of Cuneo, Piedmont, Italy, dedicated to Saint Lawrence. It is the episcopal seat of the Diocese of Alba (otherwise Alba Pompeia).

It is a Romanesque building located in the Piazza del Risorgimento, better known as Piazza Duomo ("cathedral plaza"), amidst cobbled streets.

== History ==
Location of Alba Cathedral

The earliest structure appears to have been built on the site at the end of the 5th century. A subsequent Romanesque structure was built on its ruins. The current structure, built upon the original one, dates to the first half of the 12th century, probably over holy edifices of Roman age, and is of red brick,

Between the 12th and 15th centuries the cathedral was reshaped in the form of late Gothic architecture. It was restructured in the 15th century by bishop Andrea Novelli, who arrived in Alba in 1484 to find the cathedral in poor condition. The most important renovation dates to 1652 to repair the damage caused by earthquakes in 1626. After the earthquake, the ceiling of the nave fell. It was restored along with the construction of two side aisles, one dedicated to San Theobald of Provins and the other to SS. Sacramento. The last major restoration was between 1867 and 1878 by the engineer Edoardo Arborio Mella who modified the exterior of the cathedral as well as the interior décor. This reconstruction included roofs, aisle vaults, the rebuilding of the apse, the rehabilitation of the facade, opening side windows and the replacement of the pavement. The current appearance dates to the controversial restoration of the 19th century, of which the three portals and the crypt are from the original edifice.

== Recent adaptations ==
Restoration work in 2007, including the heating infrastructure, was carried out with financial backing from Bank Foundation of Cassa di Risparmio di Cuneo. An ancient baptismal font was found during archaeological excavation in the aisle in front of the Blessed Sacrament chapel. Approximately 100 graves, primarily of children, dating from the 16th and 18th centuries were also found. The finding was not unusual as it was once customary to reuse the space of an ancient baptistery redesigned as a burial place.

The recent renovation gave the Diocese the opportunity to consider the next restoration which will be a 'liturgical adaptation' to the cathedral. In 2008, an Evaluation Committee was formed, consisting of the vicar, the parish priest, the Cultural Property Office of the Diocese, the Director of the National Office of Ecclesiastical Cultural Heritage, as well as expert architects and superintendents. It selected a design that takes into account of two of the cathedral's architectural aspects, the ancient chorus and the special decoration of with bands on the columns that stress the development of building upward. The cost of the work will be supported by the Diocese.

== Architecture and fittings ==
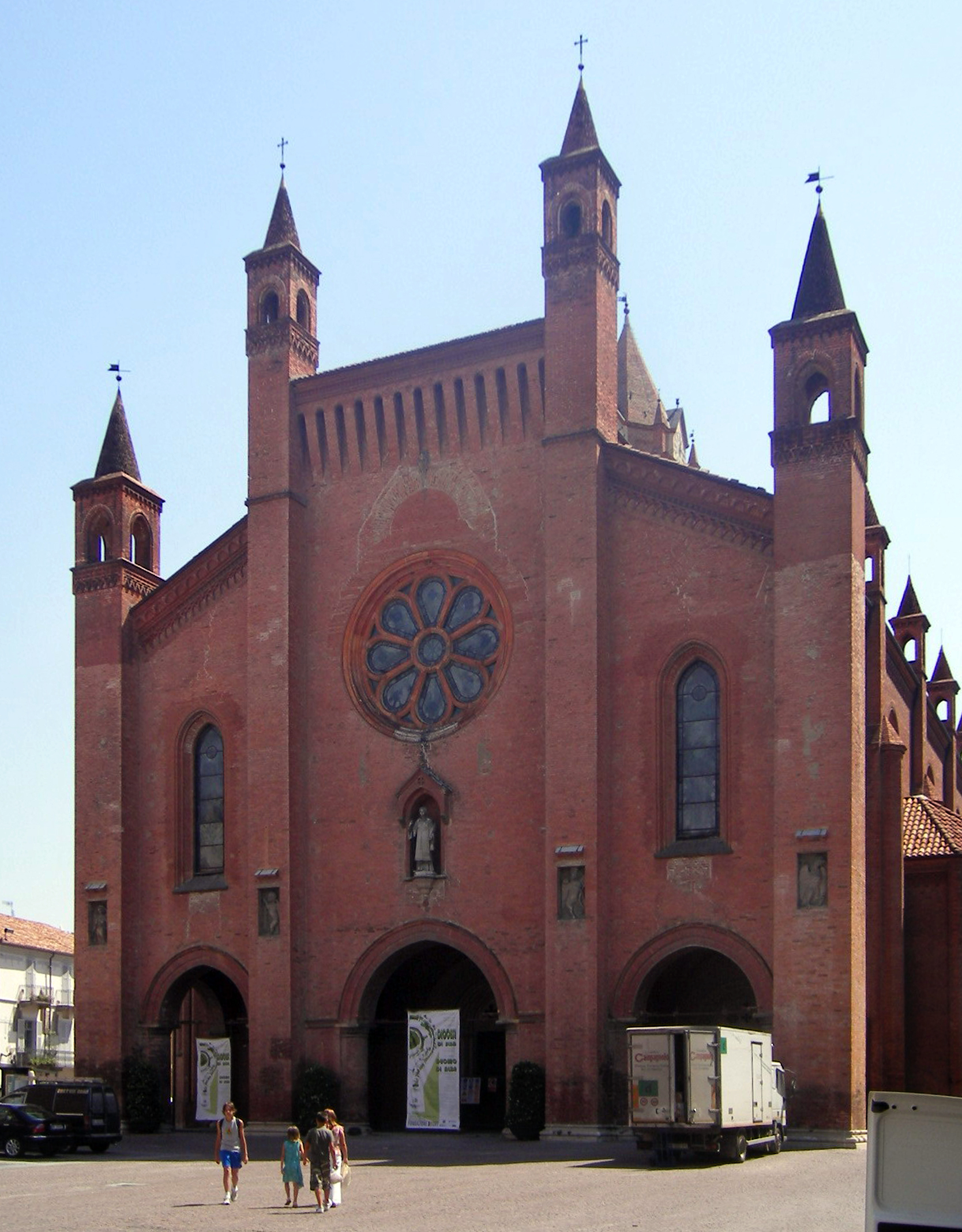
The façade

The building has a nave and two aisles, on the Latin cross plan. The first chapel on the right is that of the Holy Cross. Its altar was designed in Mella-style with neo-Gothic walls on the left side. The painting of St Joseph is from the 18th century. Paintings of Madonna and Child and St Philip date from the same century, and are attributed to Pietro Paolo Operti. The altar of Our Lady of the Sacred Heart is in Gothic style and holds a statue of the same name. The walls display paintings by Agostino Cottolengo include one of the Abbot San Palemon (1827), and the other depicting Pope Eugene (1840). The church organ was built by Fratelli Lingiardi of Pavia in 1876.

The current belfry, from the 12th century, includes entirely the original bell tower. The old bell tower, not particularly high, contains at least five overlapping buttresses to form a powerful base. It is visible by ascending through a cavity that leads to the belfry and was built as a public works project. It is symbolic of the union between Alba's clergy and Alba's society. Reconstruction of the ancient tower included the interior staircase.

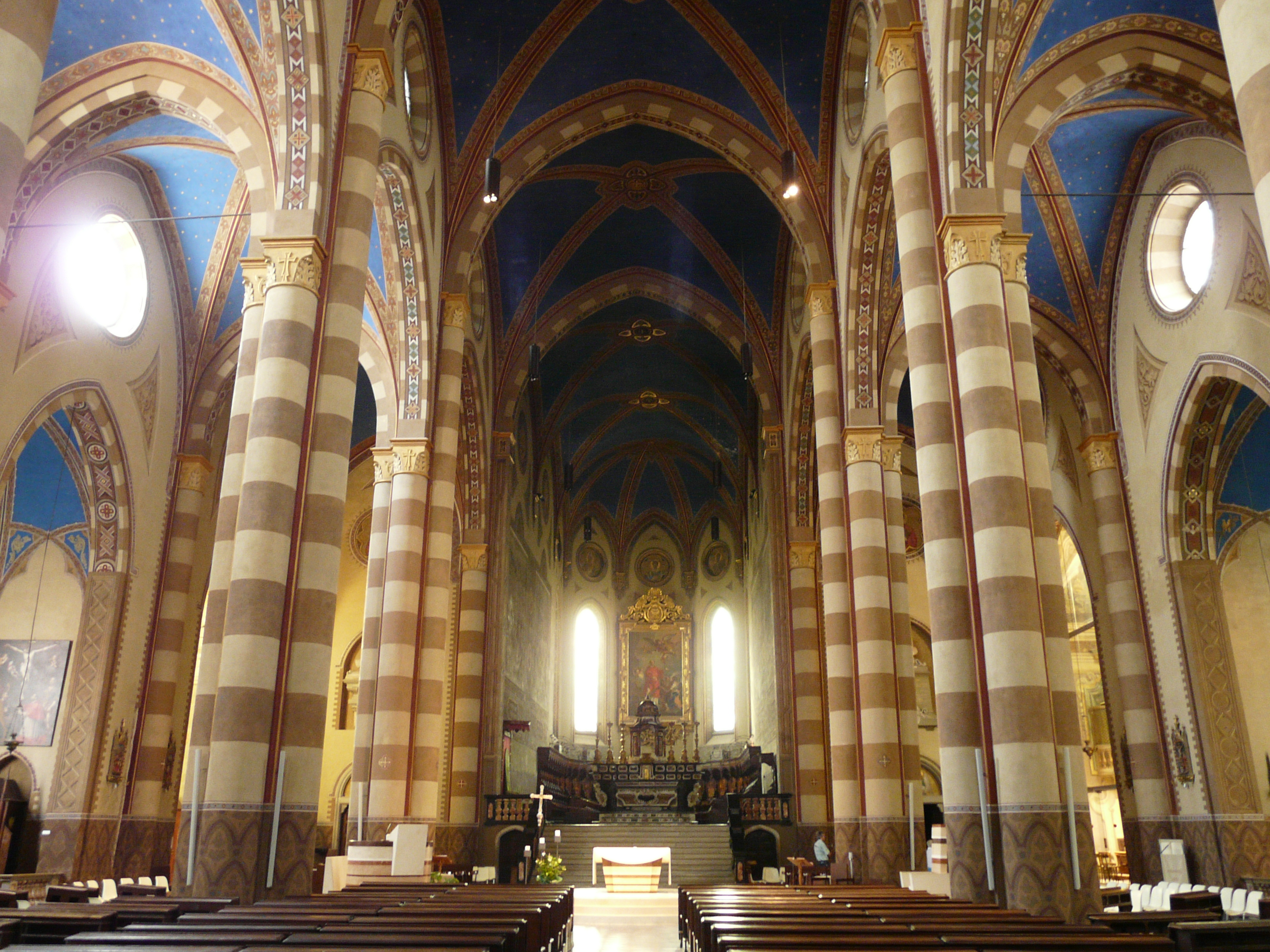
The nave

The church is well known for its wood-carved chorus stalls built in 1512 by Bernardino Fossati. The stalls consist of thirty-five seats in two semicircle rows. The center one is the Episcopal stall. An overhead canopy is flanked by 34 children's stalls, seventeen on each side. The canopies and stalls are decoratively framed in an architectural style typical of the area. This includes a traditional iconographic motif of Renaissance marquetry. The seats are separated from each other by arm rests with plant motifs. The outer paneling consists of inlaid wood scenes, each enclosed in a frame with geometric motifs. The images alternate in their subject matter. They depict differing views of development of the city of Alba, actually inventing architectural features. The semicircle of sculptural depictions, thirty-five in all, are of the Renaissance tradition. The builder used different wood types for the inlay in order to create color nuances. The sculptured subjects include bound books, cups filled with fruit and inverted cups, landscapes, musical instruments, objects of worship, symbols of the Passion, and villages perched on hilltops.

A small altar, built in 1872, is dedicated to Saint Bavo. It contains an oil painting on canvas, a representation of San Bovo, by the artist Luigi Morgari and was painted for the cathedral. Placed over a sacred table that was built to a design of Edoardo Arborio Mella, the painting is framed by stucco decorations, pale blue in color, with gold decorations. The painting portrays San Bovo kneeling in admiration of the cross which pierces the sky. The saint is wearing a red cloak, and is dressed as a soldier in boots and a helmet. He holds a waving white flag; a shield lies at his feet. A tower is visible in the distance.

A baptistery chapel designed by the architect Ugo Della Piana in 1991 contains the painting Baptism of Jesus.

== Bibliography ==
- Bartoletti, Massimo; Cabrini, Laura Damiani, I Carlone di Rovio, Fidia edizioni d'arte, Lugano 1997, 67.
- Colombo, Silvia A.; Coppa, Simonetta, I Carloni di Scaria, Fidia edizioni d'arte, Lugano 1997, 33.
- Gabrielli, Noemi, Sculture di Antonio Carlone ad Alba, in Edorado Arslan (a cura di), Arte e artisti dei laghi lombardi, I, Tipografia Editrice Antonio Noseda, Como 1959, 167-172, tavola XXXII, figure 74-75, 76-77.
