= Piero Delbosco =

Italian Catholic bishop (born 1955)

His Eminence Piero Delbosco
- Bishop, Bishop of Cuneo
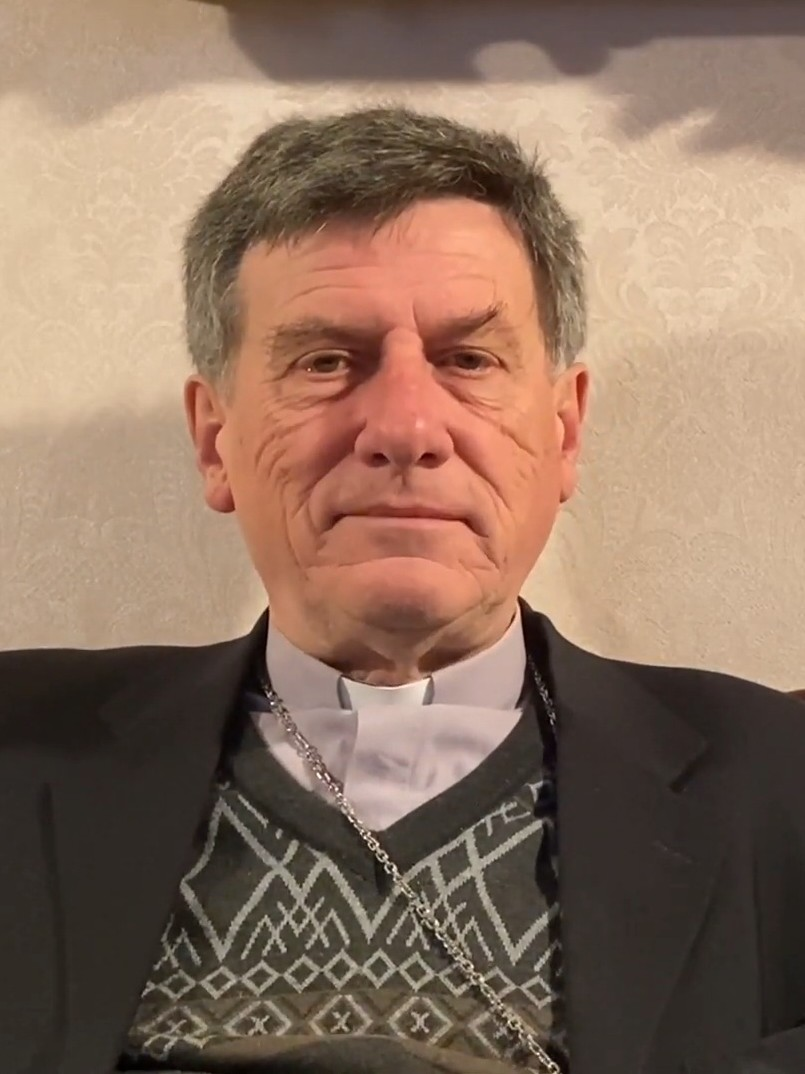
- Poletto in 2020
- Church: Catholic Church
- Archdiocese: Cuneo
- Appointed: 1 June 2023
- Installed: 1 June 2023
- Predecessor: Giuseppe Cavallotto

Personal details
- Born: Piero Delbosco; 15 August 1955 (age 70) Poirino, Italy

Piero Delbosco (born 15 August 1955) is an Italian Catholic bishop, the Bishop of the Roman Catholic Diocese of Cuneo since 1 June 2023.

== Early life ==
Delbosco was born in Poirino, in Turin, on 15 August 1955. He is the second child of Antonio and Caterina's four children.

After attending the minor seminary of Rivoli, he obtained a bachelor's degree in theology at the Turin branch of the Theological Faculty of Northern Italy. He was ordained a deacon on 11 November 1979, in the church of Santa Maria in Testona, and a priest on 15 November 1980, in the church of Santa Maria Maggiore in Poirino, by Cardinal Anastasio Alberto Ballestrero.

After ordination he carried out his ministry as parochial vicar at the parish of San Secondo in Turin, from 1980 to 1981, San Lorenzo in Collegno, from 1981 to 1987, and the Nativity of the Virgin Mary, in the Turin district of Pozzo Strada, from 1987 to 1990. In that year he was appointed parish priest of San Giacomo Apostolo in Beinasco, where he remained until 2000; since 1992 he has also been zonal vicar at the pastoral area of Orbassano. In 2000 he was transferred to Alpignano, as parish priest of the parish of San Martino Vescovo; since 2001 he has also been territorial episcopal vicar of the West Turin district. From 2005 to 2013, he also held the role of head of the diocesan houses of spirituality.

From 2008 to 2012, leaving his previous positions, he was pro-vicar general and moderator of the archiepiscopal curia. On 20 March 2010 Pope Benedict XVI conferred on him the honorary title of Prelate of Honour of His Holiness. In 2012 he was appointed diocesan delegate for the permanent diaconate and for formation for the permanent diaconate, a member of the diocesan presbyteral council, the Piedmontese presbyteral council and the Italian presbyteral council. In the years 2013-2014 he served as rector of the Consolata shrine in Turin.

From 2015 and until his episcopal appointment, maintaining his commitment as delegate for the permanent diaconate, he was parish priest of Santa Maria Maggiore in Poirino, of Sant'Antonio di Padova in the hamlet of Favari, of the Nativity of the Virgin Mary in the hamlet of Marocchi and of the Blessed Virgin Consolata in the hamlet of La Longa.

== Episcopal ministry ==
On 9 October 2015 Pope Francis appointed him bishop of Cuneo and Fossano, dioceses united in persona episcopi; he succeeded Giuseppe Cavallotto, who retired due to having reached the age limit. On 29 November of the same year he received episcopal ordination, in the cathedral of Fossano, from Archbishop Cesare Nosiglia, metropolitan of Turin, co-consecrators Cardinal Severino Poletto, archbishop emeritus of Turin, and his predecessor Giuseppe Cavallotto.

He took possession of the diocese of Fossano at the same time as his episcopal ordination, and of the diocese of Cuneo the following 6 December.

On 28 May 2021 he convened the diocesan synod for the sees of Cuneo and Fossano; After five working sessions, he concluded it on 24 June 2022, promulgating the synodal book.

On 1 June 2023, after the full union of the dioceses of Cuneo and Fossano, he was appointed first bishop of Cuneo-Fossano.
