= Giuseppe Versaldi =

Italian Roman Catholic cardinal

His Eminence Giuseppe Versaldi
- Prefect emeritus of the Congregation for Catholic Education
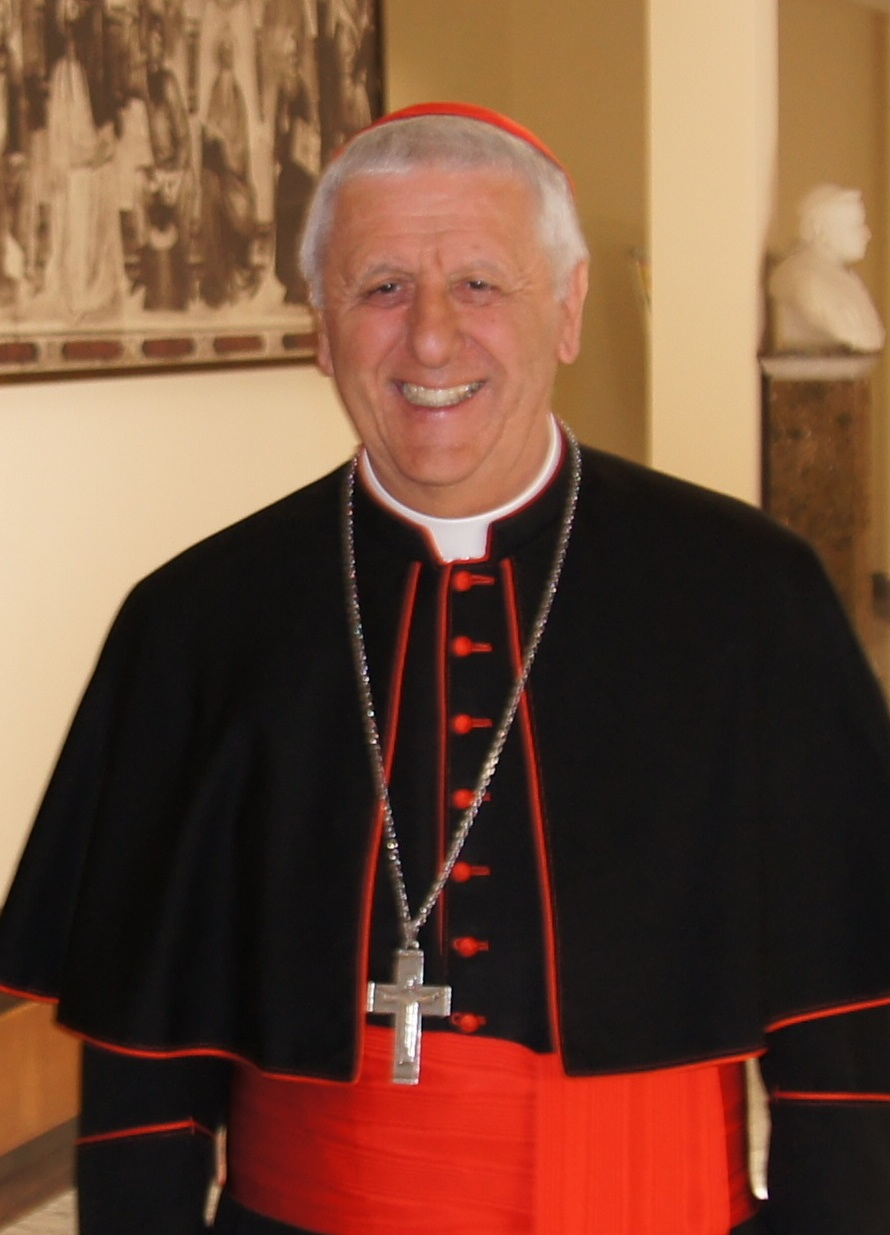
- Appointed: 31 March 2015
- Term ended: 5 June 2022
- Predecessor: Zenon Grocholewski
- Other post: Cardinal priest of Sacro Cuore di Gesù a Castro Pretorio
- Previous post: President of the Prefecture for the Economic Affairs of the Holy See (2011–2015) Bishop of Alessandria (della Paglia) from 2007 to 2011

Orders
- Ordination: 29 June 1967 by Albino Mensa
- Consecration: 26 May 2007 by Enrico Masseroni
- Created cardinal: 18 February 2012 by Benedict XVI
- Rank: Cardinal deacon (2012–22); Cardinal priest (2022–present)

Personal details
- Born: Giuseppe Versaldi; 30 July 1943 (age 83) Villarboit, Italy
- Denomination: Roman Catholic
- Education: Pontifical Gregorian University; Roman Rota
- Motto: Christi Minister
- Coat of arms

Styles of Giuseppe Versaldi
- Reference style: His Eminence
- Spoken style: Your Eminence
- Religious style: Cardinal
- Posthumous style: none
- Informal style: Cardinal

Giuseppe Versaldi (born 30 July 1943) is an Italian prelate of the Catholic Church who was the prefect of the Congregation for Catholic Education from 2015 until that body was merged into the new Dicastery for Culture and Education in 2022. He served as president of the Prefecture for the Economic Affairs of the Holy See from 2011 to 2015. Before that he was Bishop of Alessandria. Pope Benedict XVI elevated him to the rank of cardinal on 18 February 2012.

== Biography ==
Versaldi was born in 1943 in Villarboit in the province of Vercelli, Region of Piedmont, and was ordained a priest on 29 June 1967. In 1972 he was sent to Rome to study psychology and then canon law at the Pontifical Gregorian University, where he earned a degree in psychology and a doctorate in canon law. Versaldi returned to Vercelli in 1976, where he was given the task of starting the diocesan Family Counseling centre. At the same time he attended courses at the Roman Rota. He received his law degree in 1980.

In 1977 he was made pastor of the Parish of Larizza. Beginning in 1980 he taught canon law and psychology at the Pontifical Gregorian University. In 1985 he was appointed by the Holy See as tribunal clerk of the Supreme Tribunal of the Apostolic Signatura, as a voting member in 1990, and a member of the Supreme Council of the Apostolic Signatura in 2007. On 25 March 1994 he was appointed Vicar General of Vercelli by Archbishop Tarcisio Bertone.

Pope Benedict XVI named him Bishop of Alessandria on 4 April 2007. He was consecrated on 26 May 2007 by Enrico Masseroni, Archbishop of Vercelli, and Bishops Fernando Charrier and Natalino Pescarolo as co-consecrators. He was installed on 10 June 2007.

After four years as Bishop of Alessandria, on 21 September 2011, Pope Benedict XVI named Versaldi President of the Prefecture for the Economic Affairs of the Holy See and gave him the rank of archbishop.

On 18 February 2012 he was created Cardinal-Deacon of Sacro Cuore di Gesù a Castro Pretorio by Benedict XVI. On 21 April 2012, Versaldi was appointed a member of the Apostolic Signatura, the Congregation for Bishops and the Congregation for Institutes of Consecrated Life and Societies of Apostolic Life.

Versaldi was one of the 117 cardinal electors who took part in the 2013 conclave. On 31 March 2015 Pope Francis appointed him Prefect of the Congregation for Catholic Education, replacing Cardinal Zenon Grocholewski.

On 4 October 2017 he was appointed a member of the Congregation for the Evangelization of Peoples. On 14 April 2018 he was named a member of the Congregation for the Causes of Saints.

On 13 February 2019, Versaldi signed an agreement with the head of the Ministry of Education, University and Research Marco Bussetti for the application of the Lisbon Recognition Convention for the mutual recognition of the academic qualifications released by the Italian public universities and by the Holy See's pontifical institutes. The agreement widened the variety of academic titles recognized for the teaching of Roman Catholic religion in the Italian public primary and secondary schools.

On 4 March 2022, he was elevated to the rank of cardinal priest.

His service as Prefect of the Congregation for Catholic Education ended with the reorganization of the Curia that took effect on 5 June 2022.

Catholic Church titles
Preceded by Fernando Charrier	Bishop of Alessandria; 4 April 2007 – 21 September 2011	Succeeded by Guido Gallese
Preceded by Velasio de Paolis	President of the Prefecture for the Economic Affairs of the Holy See; 21 September 2011 – 31 March 2015	Office suppressed
Preceded by Giovanni Saldarini	Cardinal-Deacon of Sacro Cuore di Gesù a Castro Pretorio; 18 February 2012 –	Incumbent
Preceded by Zenon Grocholewski	Prefect of the Congregation for Catholic Education; 31 March 2015 – 5 June 2022	Office suppressed
