= Antonio Fustella =

Italian prelate

- Bishop of Saluzzo
- Church: Catholic Church
- Diocese: Diocese of Saluzzo
- In office: 22 May 1973 – 5 February 1986
- Predecessor: Egidio Luigi Lanzo
- Successor: Sebastiano Dho
- Previous posts: Apostolic Administrator of Saluzzo (1969-1973); Titular Bishop of Sebana (1967-1973); Bishop of Todi (1960-1972)

Orders
- Ordination: 5 April 1937 by Alfredo Ildefonso Schuster
- Consecration: 25 June 1960 by Giovanni Battista Enrico Antonio Maria Montini

Personal details
- Born: 24 January 1913 Pagnano, Merate, Province of Como, Kingdom of Italy
- Died: 5 February 1986 (aged 73) Saluzzo, Piedmont, Italy

Antonio Fustella (24 January 1913 – 5 February 1986) was an Italian prelate of the Catholic Church who was Bishop of Todi (1960–1967), rector of the Pontifical Lombard Seminary (1967–1969), and Apostolic Administrator (1969–1973) and Bishop (1973–1986) of Saluzzo.

== Biography ==
Antonio Fustella was born on 24 January 1913 in Pagnano di Merate, Italy, the fourth of nine children born to Guglielmo and Caterina. He completed his studies at the Pontifical Lombard Seminary in Rome, and earned a licentiate in theology at the Pontifical Gregorian University. He was ordained a priest on 5 April 1937 by Cardinal Alfredo Ildefonso Schuster, Archbishop of Milan. He then taught at the Archiepiscopal seminary of Milan and in 1948 became a parish priest in Motta Visconti.

He was dean of the Collegio San Carlo in Milan from 1955 to 1960.

On 15 May 1960, Pope John XXIII named him Bishop of Todi. He received his episcopal consecration on 25 June 1960 from Cardinal Giovanni Battista Montini, Archbishop of Milan. He participated in all four sessions of the Second Vatican Council, taking especial interest in questions of liturgical practice.

On 1 October 1967, he became rector of the Pontifical Lombard Seminary in Rome. On 19 October 1967, Pope Paul VI named him titular bishop of Sebana. His two years at the seminary were "not without problems and headaches".

On 19 June 1969, he was named Apostolic Administrator of Saluzzo sede plena, that is, with the right to succeed Bishop Egidio Luigi Lanzo, then 84 years old. (Note: At Lanzo's request, Guido Tonetti, Archbishop-Bishop of Cuneo, had been appointed administrator on 7 January 1967. Two self-published online databases date Fustella's appointment as Administrator to 1967, unaware of his position at the Pontifical Lombard Seminary.) He was welcomed in Saluzzo on 13 September 1969. Lanzo died on 29 January 1973 at the age of 87. On 22 May 1973, Pope Paul appointed Fustella Bishop of Saluzzo. His administration of the diocese focused on the reorganization of resources and personnel to support the population shifts associated with industrialization and rural depopulation. In addition to his local duties, including three complete rounds of visits to all the parishes in his diocese, he supported the missions in Cameroon and visited that country in 1975.

Fustella died of a heart attack in Saluzzo on 5 February 1986 at the age of 73. His remains were interred in the crypt of the cathedral of Maria SS. Assunta in Saluzzo.
