= Giuseppe Cavallotto =

Italian Catholic bishop (1940–2025)

The Most Reverend Giuseppe Cavallotto
- Bishop Emeritus of Cuneo; Bishop Emeritus of Fossano
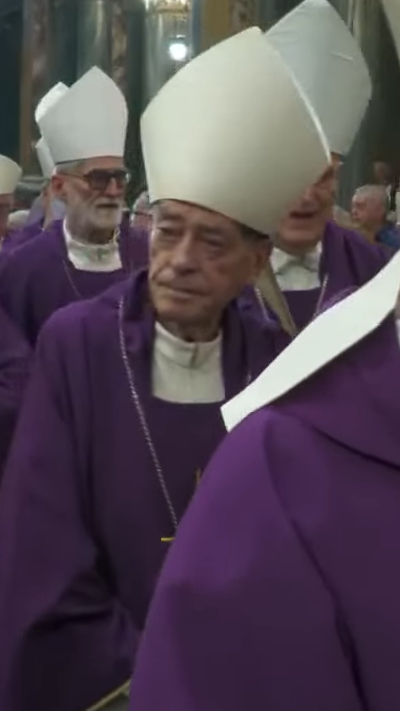
- Cavallotto in 2023
- Church: Catholic Church
- Archdiocese: Turin
- Appointed: 24 August 2005
- Term ended: 9 October 2015
- Predecessor: Natalino Pescarolo
- Successor: Piero Delbosco

Orders
- Ordination: 29 June 1964
- Consecration: 15 October 2005 by Severino Poletto

Personal details
- Born: Giuseppe Cavallotto; 13 February 1940 Vinchio, Italy
- Died: 27 April 2025 (aged 85) Cuneo, Italy
- Motto: Vitam impendere vero
- Coat of arms

Styles of Giuseppe Cavallotto
- Reference style: His Excellency; The Most Reverend
- Spoken style: Your Excellency
- Religious style: Bishop

Giuseppe Cavallotto (13 February 1940 – 27 April 2025) was an Italian Roman Catholic prelate, who was the Bishop of the dioceses of Cuneo and Fossano from 2005 to 2015.

Giuseppe Cavallotto was born in Noche, a hamlet of Vinchio, in the province and diocese of Asti, on 13 February 1940. On 24 August 2005 he was appointed bishop of the dioceses united in persona episcopi of Cuneo and Fossano by Pope Benedict XVI.

Cavallotto died in Cuneo on 27 April 2025, at the age of 85.

Catholic Church titles
Preceded by Natalino Pescarolo	Bishop of Cuneo; Bishop of Fossano; 2005–2015	Succeeded by Piero Delbosco
