= Fernando Charrier =

Italian Roman Catholic bishop

- Bishop of Alessandria della Paglia
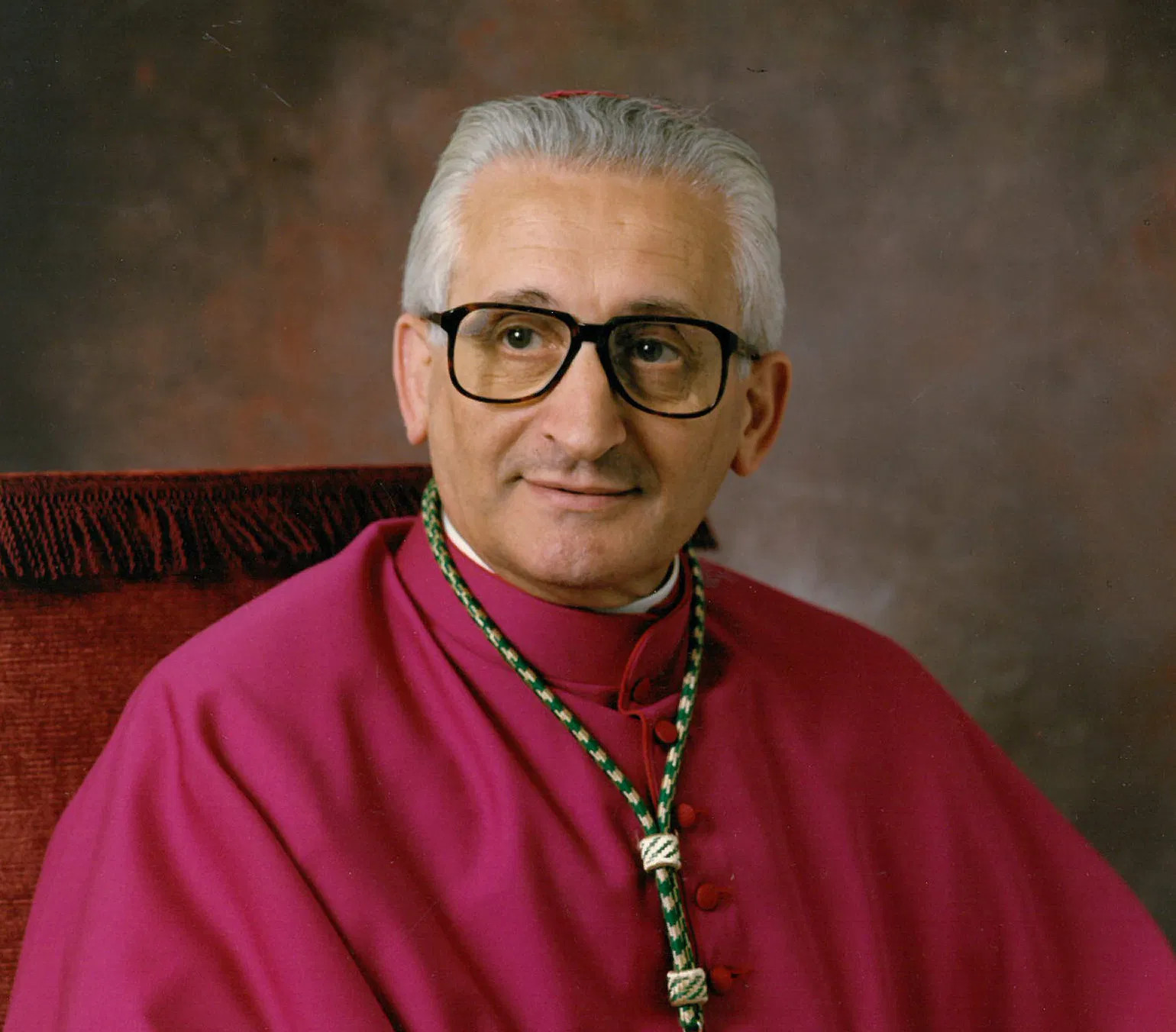
- Church: Catholic Church
- Diocese: Diocese of Alessandria della Paglia
- In office: 22 April 1989 – 4 April 2007
- Predecessor: Ferdinando Maggioni
- Successor: Giuseppe Versaldi
- Previous posts: Auxiliary Bishop of Siena–Colle di Val d'Elsa–Montalcino (1986-1989); Titular Bishop of Cercina (1984-1989); Auxiliary Bishop of Siena (1984-1986); Auxiliary Bishop of Colle di Val d'Elsa (1984-1986); Auxiliary Bishop of Montalcino (1984-1986)

Orders
- Ordination: 24 June 1956
- Consecration: 11 November 1984 by Anastasio Ballestrero

Personal details
- Born: 12 September 1931 Bourcet (in present-day Roure), Province of Turin, Kingdom of Italy
- Died: 7 October 2011 (aged 80) Alessandria, Piedmont, Italy
- Coat of arms

Fernando Charrier (12 September 1931 – 7 October 2011) was the Roman Catholic bishop of the Roman Catholic Diocese of Alessandria della Paglia, Italy.

Ordained to the priesthood in 1956, Charrier became a bishop in 1984 and retired in 2007.
