= Arborio =

Arborio may refer to:

- Arborio, Piedmont, a small town and commune in the province of Vercelli, north-west Italy
- Arborio rice, a variety which is named after the town
- Arborio (surname)
