= Natalino =

Natalino may refer to:

- Natalino (Chilean band), Chilean rock group
- Natalino Otto (1912 – 1969), Italian singer
- Felice Natalino (born 1992), Italian former footballer
- Nicole Natalino (born 1989), Chilean singer
- Natalino Sapegno (1901 - 1990), literary critic and Italian academician
- Natalino Pescarolo (1929 – 2015), Italian Roman Catholic bishop
