= Ferdinando Maggioni =

Italian prelate

- Bishop of Alessandria della Paglia
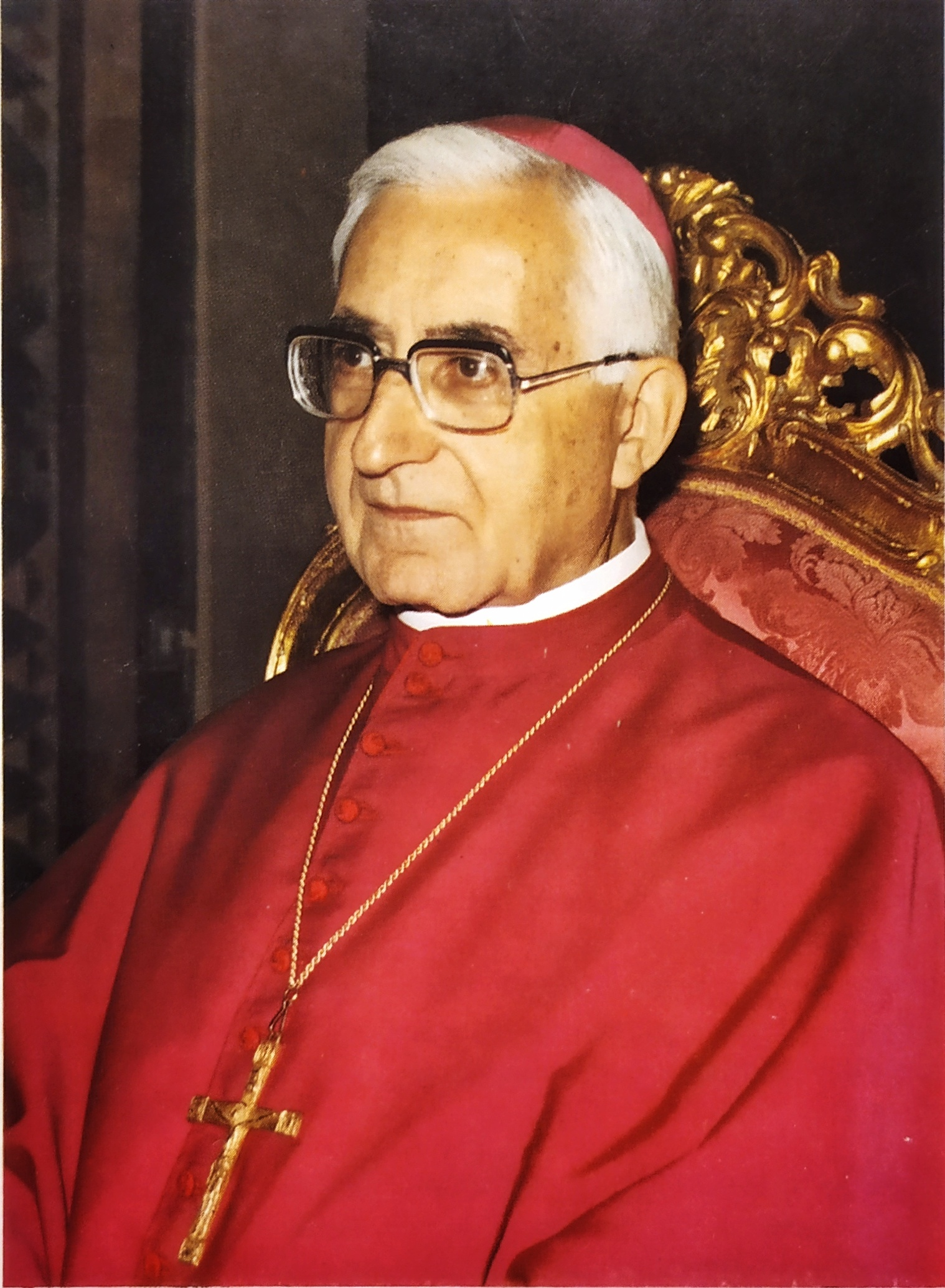
- Church: Catholic Church
- Diocese: Diocese of Alessandria della Paglia
- In office: 17 July 1980 – 22 April 1989
- Predecessor: Giuseppe Almici
- Successor: Fernando Charrier
- Previous posts: Titular Bishop of Subaugusta (1967-1980); Auxiliary Bishop of Milan (1967-1980)

Orders
- Ordination: 26 July 1936 by Alfredo Ildefonso Schuster
- Consecration: 29 October 1967 by Giovanni Colombo

Personal details
- Born: 5 February 1914 Monza, Province of Milan, Kingdom of Italy
- Died: 2 December 1998 (aged 84)

Ferdinando Maggioni (5 February 1914 – 2 December 1998) was an Italian prelate of the Catholic Church who devoted the first half of his career to seminary education, including six years as Rector of the Pontifical Lombard Seminary in Rome. He was then auxiliary bishop of Milan from 1967 to 1980 and Bishop of Alessandria from 1980 to 1989.

== Biography ==
Ferdinando Maggioni was born on 5 February 1914 in Monza, Italy. He studied at the Pontifical Lombard Seminary from October 1931 to June 1935 and while there attended the Pontifical Gregorian University. He was ordained a priest of the Archdiocese of Milan on 26 July 1936. He taught theology in Monza from 1935 to 1941, performed pastoral duties from 1941 to 1949. He was spiritual director at another college until 1955 and then rector of another college until 1960, when Cardinal Giovanni Battista Montini, Archbishop of Milan, made him head of the archdiocesan office of education. In 1961 he succeeded Francesco Bertoglio as Rector of the Pontifical Lombard Seminary, a position he held until 1967.

On 14 September 1967, Pope Paul VI named him titular bishop of Subaugusta and auxiliary bishop of Milan. He received his episcopal consecration on 29 October 1967 from Cardinal Giovanni Colombo, Archbishop of Milan.

On 17 July 1980, Pope John Paul II named him Bishop of Alessandria.

He retired upon the appointment of his successor, Fernando Charrier, on 22 April 1989.

Maggioni died on 2 December 1998 at the age of 84.
