= Cavallotti =

Cavallotti is an Italian surname. Notable people with the surname include:

- Elisabetta Cavallotti (born 1967), Italian actress
- Felice Cavallotti (1842–1898), Italian politician, poet, and author
- Maximiliano Cavallotti (born 1984), Argentine footballer
- Rubén W. Cavallotti (1924–1999), Argentine film director

== See also ==
- Giuseppe Cavallotto (1940–2025), Italian Catholic bishop
