= Guido Gallese =

Italian Catholic prelate (born 1962

- Bishop of Alessandria
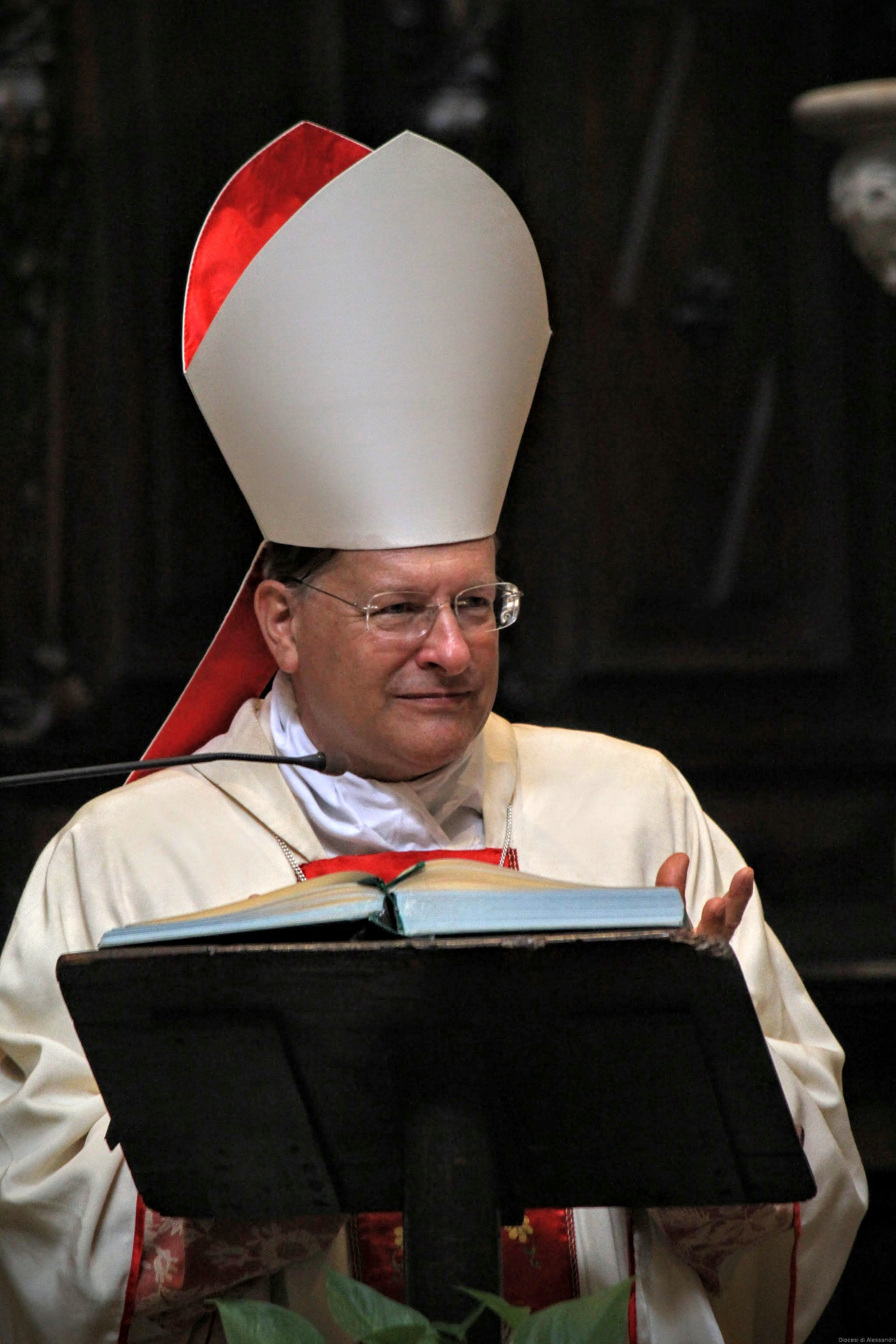
- Church: Catholic
- Diocese: Alessandria
- Appointed: 20 October 2012
- Term ended: 11 September 2026
- Predecessor: Giuseppe Versaldi
- Other post: Bishop emeritus of Alessandria (2026‍–‍ )

Orders
- Ordination: 29 September 1990 by Giovanni Canestri
- Consecration: 11 November 2012 by Angelo Bagnasco

Personal details
- Born: 18 March 1962 Genoa, Province of Genoa, Italy
- Motto: Vulnerasti Cor Meum (Latin for 'You have wounded my heart')

Styles of Gudio Gallese
- Reference style: The Most Reverend
- Spoken style: Your Excellency
- Religious style: Monsignor

Guido Gallese (born 18 March 1962) is an Italian Catholic prelate who served as Bishop of Alessandria from 2012 until his resignation under duress in 2026.

== Career ==
Gallese previously served as director of the Diocesan Office for the university and head of diocesan youth ministry.

Gallese was appointed bishop-elect of Alessandria by Pope Benedict XVI with the announcement being made on 20 October 2012. The diocese had been vacant since September 2011 when then-Bishop Giuseppe Versaldi was appointed president of the Prefecture of the Economic Affairs of the Holy See. As per the norms of canon law Gallese must be ordained and installed within four months of his appointment.

Gallese was raised to the episcopate on Sunday 11 November 2012, and was installed and took possession of the see on 25 November. He resigned in September 2026 after an investigation into misuse of funds.
