= Arborio (surname) =

Arborio is an Italian surname. Notable people with the surname include:

- Count Carlo Emanuele Arborio Mella
  - Edoardo Arborio Mella (1808–1884)
- Ferdinando Arborio Gattinara di Breme (1807–1869)
- Mercurino Arborio, marchese di Gattinara (1465 - 1530, an Italian statesman and jurist
