= Ernesto Fontana =

- Bishop of Crema
- Church: Catholic Church
- Diocese: Diocese of Crema
- In office: 18 May 1894 – 4 November 1910
- Predecessor: Francesco Sabbia
- Successor: Bernardo Pizzorno

Orders
- Ordination: 1 April 1854
- Consecration: 24 May 1894 by Lucido Parocchi

Personal details
- Born: 7 October 1830 Milan, Kingdom of Lombardy–Venetia, Austrian Empire
- Died: 4 November 1910 (aged 80)

Ernesto Fontana (7 October 1830 – 4 November 1910) was an Italian prelate of the Catholic Church who was a seminary teacher, Rector of the Pontifical Lombard Seminary from 1878 to 1894, and Bishop of Crema from 1894 to 1910.

== Biography ==
Ernesto Fontana was born on 7 October 1830 in Milan, Italy. He was ordained a priest on 1 April 1854.

He taught moral theology at the Major Seminary of Milan. He served as Rector of the Pontifical Lombard Seminary in Rome from 1878 to 1894. He was named a consultor to the Sacred Congregation of the Index and a member of the Pontifical Academy of Saint Thomas Aquinas.

On 18 May 1894, Pope Leo XIII named him Bishop of Crema. He received his episcopal consecration in the Seminary chapel on 24 May 1894 from Cardinal Lucido Maria Parocchi.

Fontana died on 4 November 1910 at the age of 80.
