= Pontifical Lombard Seminary =

Catholic seminary in Italy

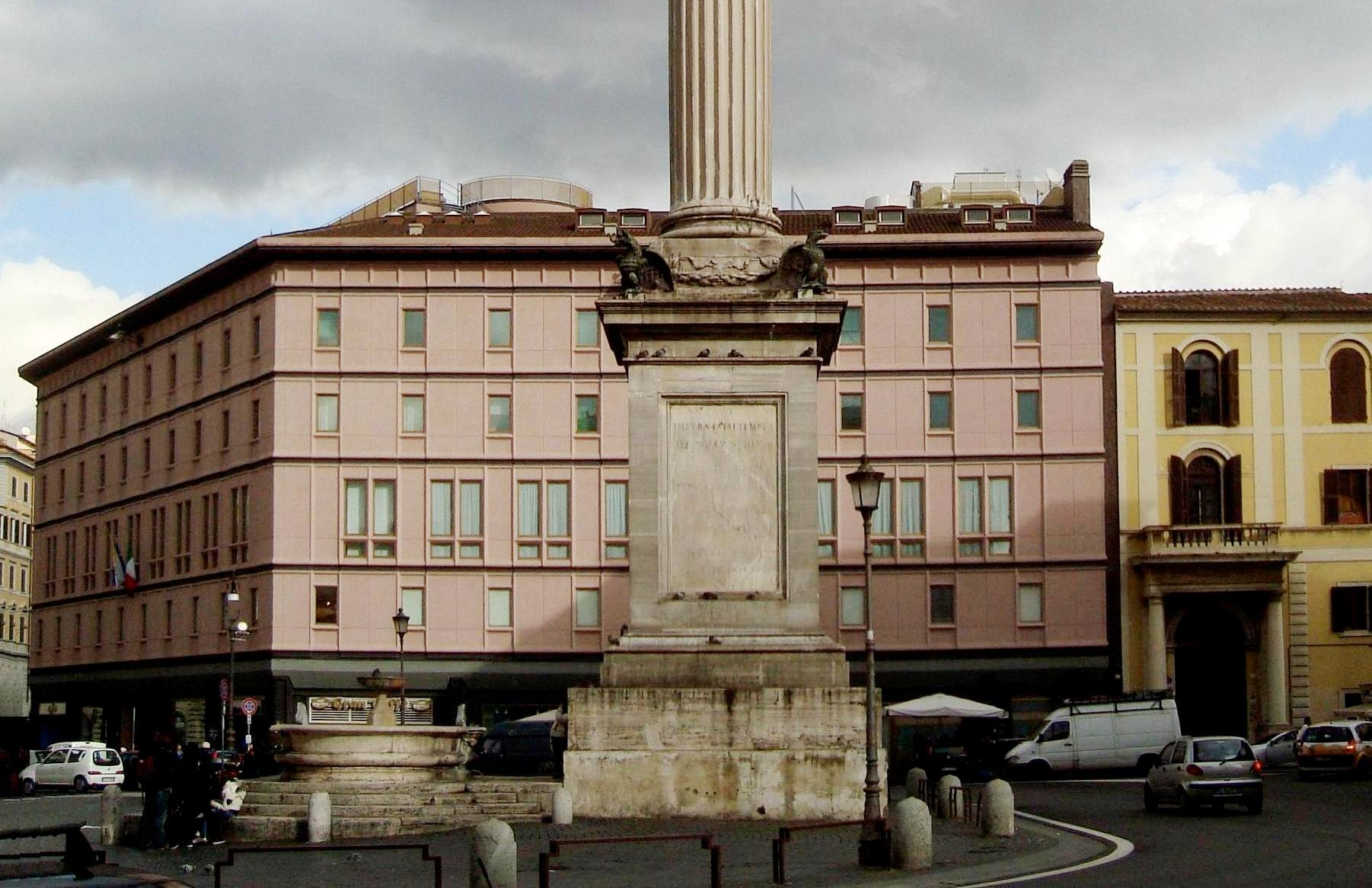
The Pontifical Lombard Seminary on the Piazza di Santa Maria Maggiore

The Pontifical Lombard Seminary of Saints Ambrose and Charles in Urbe (Italian: Pontificio seminario lombardo dei santi Ambrogio e Carlo in Urbe) is an ecclesiastical institution that serves as a residence for and trains diocesan priests who have been sent to Rome by their bishop to pursue an advanced degree or follow a specialized course of study at one of the pontifical universities there.

The seminary is subject to the authority of the Lombard Episcopal Conference and as a Roman ecclesiastical institute it also has a particular dependence on the Holy See. While many of the students originate in the dioceses of Lombardy, the seminary accepts priests from other dioceses, both Italian and not.

== History ==
The seminary was founded by the bishops of Lombardy in 1854. It was initially funded by Cardinal Edoardo Borromeo and Duke Tommaso Gallarati Scotti (1819–1905), though insufficient resources forced it to close from 1869 to 1878. It first shared quarters with the Confraternity of San Carlo al Corso and in 1888 opened its own residence on in Via Giuseppe Gioachino Belli in the Prati del Castello district. Pope Leo XIII gave the Seminary its legal character on 15 December 1890, recognizing it in the same terms as the other Roman seminaries and granting it the use of the title "Pontifical".

Its current building overlooks the square in front of the Basilica of Santa Maria Maggiore in the Esquilino district of Rome. Cardinal Giovanni Battista Montini laid its cornerstone on 10 February 1963 and returned to inaugurate the building as Pope Paul VI on 11 November 1965. The building is considered one of the most significant modern buildings in the historic center of Rome. It was designed by the architects Attilio Spaccarelli and Fabrizio Bruno, "characterized by great attention to the urban context".

== Rectors ==
- Antonio Müller (Note: When he arrived at the start of the academic year 1863–64, he was titled the Pro-Rector while Borromeo held the title of Rector. Müller was a native of the Swiss Canton of Ticino and a priest of the Archdiocese of Milan whom the Italian government had removed from his teaching position at the seminary there.) (1863-1870)
- Ernesto Fontana (1878-1894)
- Alessandro Lualdi (1894-1904)
- Angelo Rotta (1904-1911)
- Rodolfo Caroli (1911-1913)
- Ettore Baranzini (1920-1933)
- Francesco Bertoglio (1933-1961)
- Ferdinando Maggioni (1961-1967)
- Antonio Fustella (1967-1969)
- Luigi Belloli (1969-1987)
- Dionigi Tettamanzi (1987-1989)
- Diego Coletti (1989-2000)
- Tullio Citrini (2000-2014)
- Ennio Apeciti (2014–present)
