= Sacro Cuore di Gesù a Castro Pretorio =

Basilica of the Sacred Heart of Jesus at the Praetorian Barracks
- Sacro Cuore di Gesù al Castro Pretorio (in Italian); Sacratissimi Cordis Iesu ad Castrum Praetorium (in Latin)
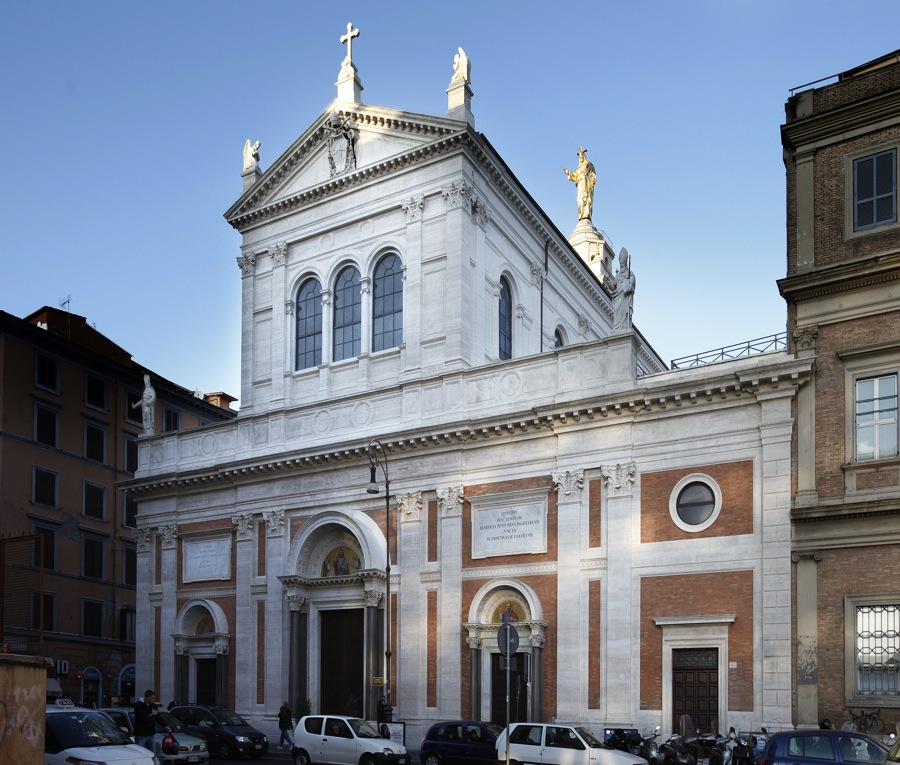
- Facade
- Click on the map for a fullscreen view
- 41°54′10″N 12°30′9.5″E
- Location: Via Marsala 42, Rome
- Country: Italy
- Denomination: Roman Catholic
- Tradition: Roman Rite
- Religious institute: Salesians
- Website: basilicadelsacrocuore.it

History
- Status: Parish church; Titular church; Minor basilica; Conventual church of the Generalate of the Society of Saint Francis de Sales
- Dedication: Sacred Heart
- Consecrated: 1887

Architecture
- Architect: Francesco Vespignani
- Architectural type: Church
- Style: Renaissance Revival
- Groundbreaking: 1879

Specifications
- Length: 70 metres (230 ft)
- Width: 30 metres (98 ft)

Sacro Cuore di Gesù al Castro Pretorio (English: Sacred Heart of Jesus at the Praetorian Barracks) is a Catholic parish and titular church in Rome, Italy, the mother church of the Salesian Order.

== History ==
The church was originally planned by Pope Pius IX, the land being bought by him along the via di Porta San Lorenzo, now via Marsala. His intention was to dedicate the church to Saint Joseph, who the Pope had declared Patron of the Universal Church on 8 December 1870. In 1871 however, he decided to dedicate the church to the Sacred Heart of Jesus. Construction work began under Pope Leo XIII, who named as architect Francesco Vespignani. Conte Vespignani (1842–1899) was the Architetto dei Sacri Palazzi of Leo XIII, and also built the College of Sant'Anselmo on the Aventine Hill. However, the work came to a halt for lack of funds. At this point, the pope entrusted the work to Don Bosco (St. John Bosco). With the pope's permission, Bosco bought an additional 0.55 ha (1.4 acres) of land to construct a boarding school for poor boys, and also a two floor building at the corner of via di Porta San Lorenzo and via Marghera that would serve as a residence for the Salesians. Bosco managed to collect the funds necessary for the construction of the church by appealing to the Catholic world and by making personal journeys to France and to Spain, despite failing health. The church was consecrated on 14 May 1887.

The campanile (bell tower) was planned by Vespignani, but remained incomplete until 1931, when the imposing statue of the Sacred Heart, donated by Salesian past pupils in Argentina, was placed on it.

Dedicated to the Sacred Heart, the church is served by the Salesian fathers and brothers. It used to have an adjoining trade school with a hostel. At the death of Bosco, only the church and the building on via Marsala had been completed. Under his successor Don Michele Rua, the wings on via Marghera and via Magenta were constructed. When the trade school closed down, its place was taken by a middle school, gymnasium, and liceo classico. It later became the provincial house of the Salesian province (first the IRO and later the ICC) and the offices of the CNOS (Centro Nazionale Opere Salesiane). Since 2017, it is the seat of the central government of the Salesian Congregation. The complex hosts also a significant work for young migrants, volunteers and university students, along with a hostel for young people managed by the Salesians and the Missionarie di Cristo Risorto.

The church was elevated to the status of a minor basilica in 1921.

== Cardinal-deacons ==
The Church of Sacro Cuore was established as a Deaconry on 5 February 1965 by Pope Paul VI, in anticipation of his creating twenty-seven new cardinals on 28 February 1965.

- Maximilien de Fürstenberg (pro hac vice to title for a Cardinal Priest) (26 June 1967 – 22 September 1988)
- Giovanni Saldarini (pro hac vice for Cardinal Priest) (28 June 1991 – 18 April 2011)
- Giuseppe Versaldi Cardinal Deacon (since 18 February 2012)

== Gallery ==
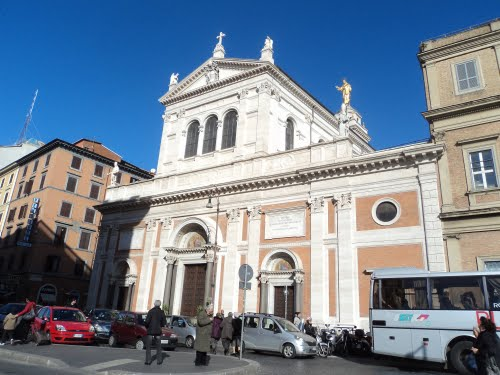

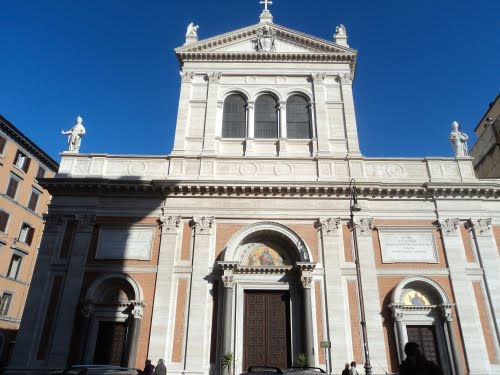

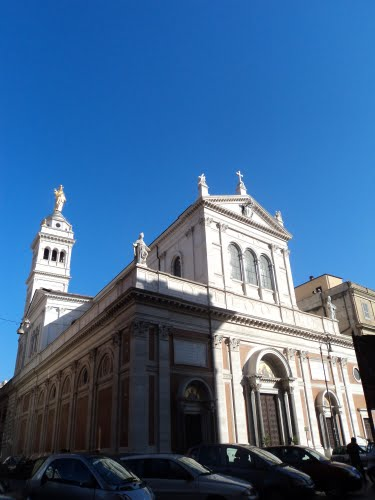

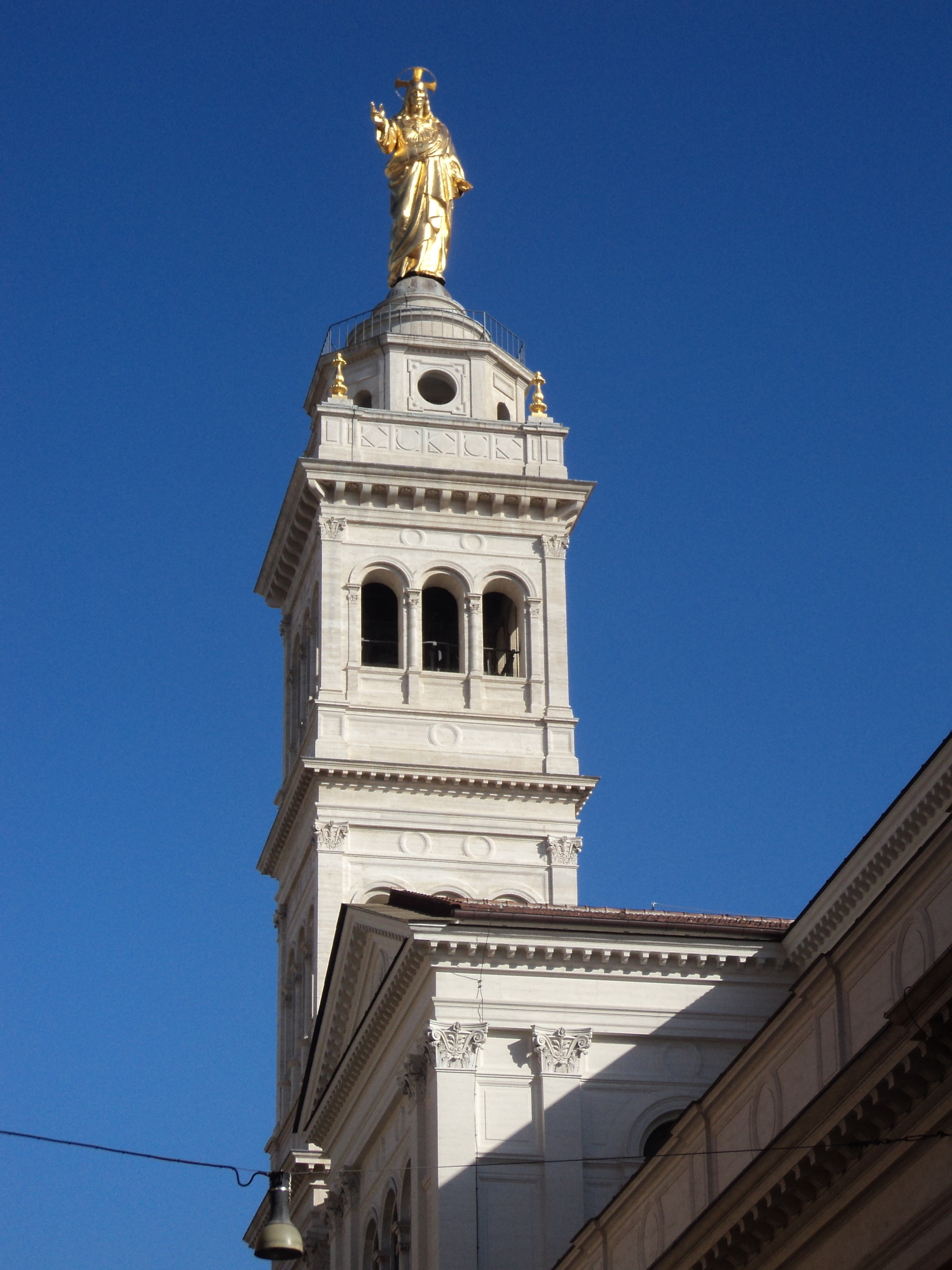

== Notes ==
Preceded by Sacro Cuore di Cristo Re	Landmarks of Rome; Sacro Cuore di Gesù a Castro Pretorio	Succeeded by San Sebastiano fuori le mura
