= Michele Pellegrino =

Italian cardinal

His Eminence Michele Pellegrino
- Cardinal, Archbishop Emeritus of Turin
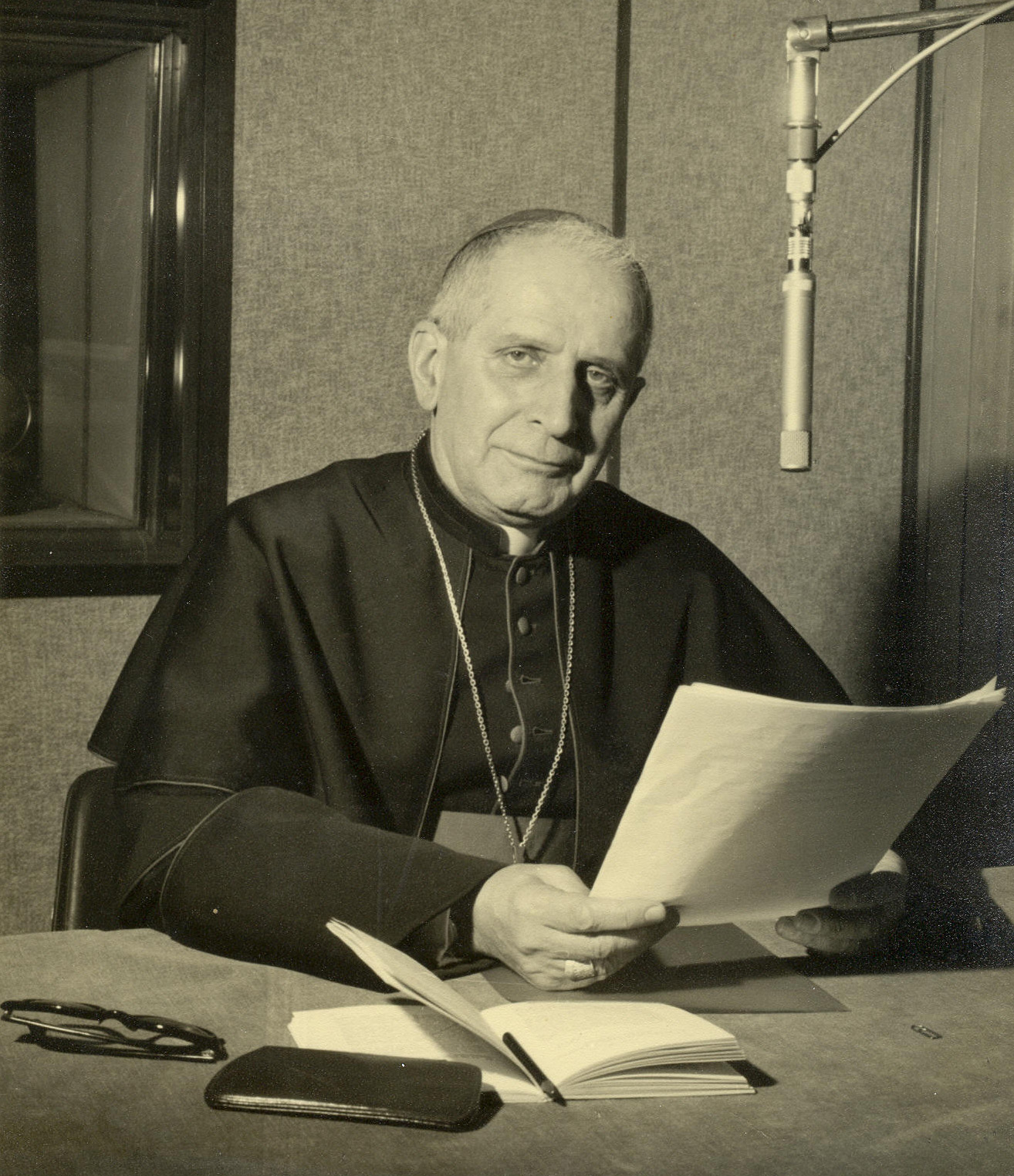
- Church: Catholic Church
- Archdiocese: Turin
- Appointed: 18 September 1965
- Installed: 21 November 1965
- Term ended: 1 August 1977
- Predecessor: Maurilio Fossati
- Successor: Anastasio Alberto Ballestrero
- Other post: Cardinal-Priest of Santissimo Nome di Gesù pro hac vice (1967-86)

Orders
- Ordination: 19 September 1925 by Quirico Travaini
- Consecration: 17 October 1965 by Giovanni Francesco Dadone
- Created cardinal: 26 June 1967 by Paul VI
- Rank: Cardinal-Priest

Personal details
- Born: Michele Pellegrino; 25 April 1903 Centallo, Cuneo, Italy
- Died: 10 October 1986 (aged 83) Cottolengo Hospital, Turin, Italy
- Parents: Giuseppe Pellegrino; Angela Ristorti
- Education: University of the Sacred Heart, Milan
- Motto: Evangelizare pauperibus
- Coat of arms

Styles of Michele Pellegrino
- Reference style: His Eminence
- Spoken style: Your Eminence
- Religious style: Cardinal
- Informal style: Cardinal
- See: Turin

Michele Pellegrino (25 April 1903 – 10 October 1986) was an Italian cardinal who served as Archbishop of Turin from 1965 until 1977.

== Biography ==
Pellegrino was born in Centallo, province of Cuneo. He was educated at the Seminary of Fossano, Catholic University of Milan, and the Theological Faculty in Turin. He was ordained on 19 September 1925 in Fossano. After his ordination, he served as spiritual director of the Seminary of Fossano from 1929 until 1933. He was Canon of the cathedral chapter of Fossano, vicar general and vicar capitular of the diocese between 1933 and 1943. He taught early Christian literature as a faculty member of the University of Turin until 1965.

== Episcopate ==
Pope Paul VI appointed him Archbishop of Turin on 18 September 1965. As a bishop, he was present at the last session of the Second Vatican Council in 1965.

== Cardinalate ==
He was created Cardinal-Priest of Santissimo Nome di Gesù by Pope Paul VI on 26 June 1967.

In August 1968, Pellegrino visited Denmark, where he stayed with the apostolic delegate to the Nordic countries, Archbishop Bruno B. Heim, in Vedbæk. A contemporary Danish press report described him as one of the most prominent figures in the Catholic Church, mentioned him as a possible future papal candidate, and placed him on the progressive wing among the Italian Catholic bishops.

He resigned from the government of the archdiocese in 1977 due to the age limit. He participated in the conclaves that elected Pope John Paul I and Pope John Paul II. He died three years later and is buried in his family tomb at Roata Chiusani Cemetery.

Catholic Church titles
Preceded by Maurilio Fossati	Archbishop of Turin; 18 September 1965 – 1 August 1977	Succeeded by Anastasio Ballestrero
