= Diocese of Alessandria =

Roman Catholic diocese in Italy

Coordinates: 44.9000°N 8.6167°E

Diocese of Alessandria Dioecesis Alexandrina Statiellorum Diocesi di Alessandria

Catholic
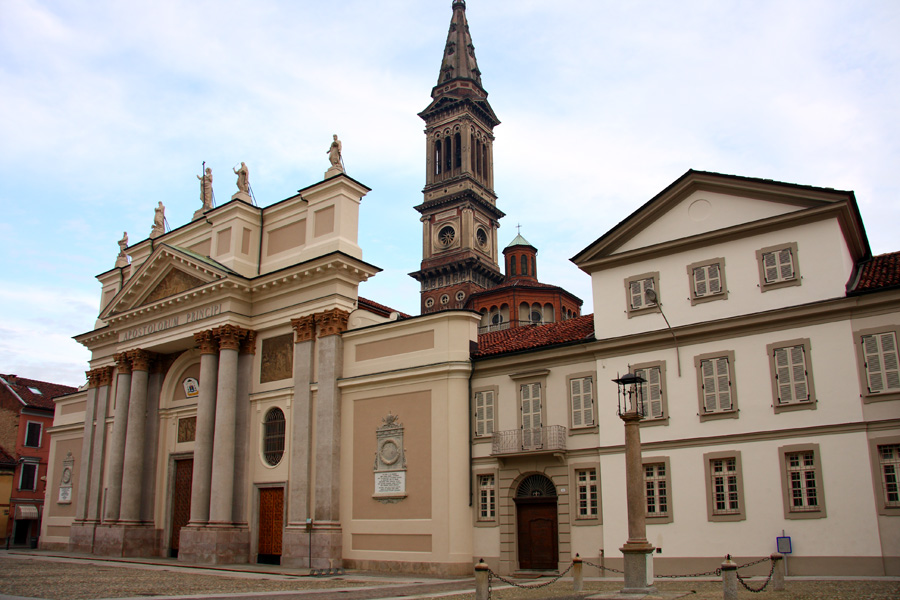
- Alessandria Cathedral

Location
- Country: Italy
- Metropolitan: Archdiocese of Vercelli
- Headquarters: Alessandria, Piedmont, Italy

Statistics
- Area: 740 km^{2} (290 sq mi)
- Population: Total; Catholics: (as of 2023); 152,900 (est.) ▼; 140,000 (est.) ▼ (91.6%)
- Parishes: 74

Information
- Denomination: Catholic Church
- Sui iuris church: Latin Church
- Rite: Roman Rite
- Established: 1175; 851 years ago
- Cathedral: Cattedrale di S. Pietro Apostolo
- Patron saint: Saint Baudolino
- Secular priests: 48 (Diocesan) ▲9 (Religious Orders) ▼7 Permanent Deacons

Current leadership
- Pope: Leo XIV
- Metropolitan Archbishop: Marco Arnolfo
- Apostolic Administrator: Luigi Testore
- Bishops emeritus: Guido Gallese

Map

Website
- www.diocesialessandria.it (in Italian)

The Diocese of Alessandria (Latin: Dioecesis Alexandrina Statiellorum) (Alessandria della Paglia) is a Latin diocese of the Catholic Church in Piedmont, northern Italy. Originally a suffragan of the Archdiocese of Milan, since 1817 it has been a suffragan of the Archdiocese of Vercelli.

== History ==
=== Foundation of the city ===
In 1168, in response to the aggression of Emperor Frederick Barbarossa, the leaders of Milan, Cremona and Piacenza, established a new town in order to discomfit Frederick's ally Pavia. The new city was to be made up of the inhabitants of the villages of Quargnento, Solero, Oviglio, Foro, Bergoglio, Rovereto, Marengo and Gamondio. Seeking support for their undertaking, they sent ambassadors to Pope Alexander III (1159–1181) in January 1170, announcing that they had named the new city Alessandria in his honor, and begging for his support. They offered the city to the Papacy to be forever the vassal of the Holy Roman Church. They set aside three jugera ("moggi") of land at the junction of the Quartiere di Marengo and the Quartiere di Gamondo, thanks to the generosity of the Marchesi del Bosco, for the construction of a "Chiesa maggiore" under the title of S. Pietro, who had been declared their patron saint two years earlier. The church, originally a collegiate church, was begun immediately, and was completed by 1178. It had been raised to the dignity of a cathedral church in 1175. It was small, too small for the growing population, and needed to be rebuilt. A new cathedral was under construction in 1289, and was completed in 1297.

=== Establishment of the diocese ===
Alessandria was made a diocese in 1175 by Pope Alexander III, with territory removed from the diocese of Acqui, Asti, Pavia, Tortona, and Milan. The diocese was declared to be a suffragan of the metropolitan of Milan.

In a Brief of 30 January 1176, Pope Alexander declared that he had selected Alessandria's first bishop, though he did so without any prejudice to the rights of the Chapter for the future to elect their bishop, just as the other suffragans of Milan did. The new bishop, Arduinus, died before he could be consecrated, and another candidate was substituted, who also did not receive an episcopal consecration. Archbishop Galdinus of Milan, who had been appointed to carry out the episcopal consecration, died on 18 April 1176.

On 28 May 1176, the Lombard League, of which Alessandria was a member, and of which Pope Alexander III was the nominal head, defeated Frederick Barbarossa in the Battle of Legnano, ending the emperor's fifth and last attempt to subdue the cities of Lombardy and Piedmont.

At the Third Lateran Council, held by Pope Alexander in March 1179, Archbishop Algesius and twelve of his suffragan bishops attended and subscribed the acts, including Bishop Ubertus of Aqui. No bishop of Alessandria was present.

On 18 July 1180, Pope Alexander III confirmed the election of Bishop Otto by the cathedral chapter of S. Pietro (which was already in existence and operating), with the agreement of the clergy and people, and also confirmed in their dignities Magister Hugo the Provost, Magister Cataldo the Archpriest, and Magister P(etrus?) the Cantor. He also confirmed the assignment of seven churches in the diocese for the use of the canons.

==== Dioceses of Alessandria and Acqui in conflict ====
Unhappy with the situation in Piedmont, however, and since Alexandria was already larger than Acqui, Pope Alexander in 1180 ordered that the seat of Acqui should be transferred to Alessandria. It was apparently intended that the bishop who was to reside in Alessandria was to govern both the dioceses, aeque personaliter. Archbishop Algisius of Milan wrote to the clergy and people of Alessandria that he was acting in accordance to a mandate from the pope to transfer the seat of the bishop of Aqui to the city of Alessandria. He also absolved them of the oath of fidelity which they had sworn to bishop-elect Otto. The clergy of Acqui objected to the loss of the presence of the bishop in their city, and the people of Alessandria refused to admit Bishop Ubertus of Acqui. Alessandria was therefore left without a bishop down to 1205. The Papacy was therefore faced with the need to sort out conflicts between the Chapter of Alessandria and the Chapter of Acqui. Pope Innocent III, therefore, in a letter of 12 May 1205, not only restated the terms of the bull of Pope Alexander III which transferred the seat of the bishop of Acqui to Alessandria, but also determined that there was to be a union of the two dioceses. He ordered Bishop Opizzo of Dertona and Canon Bongiovanni of Vercelli to carry out his mandate. Bishop Ugo Tornelli, who had been Bishop of Acqui since 1183, therefore was confirmed as bishop of Alessandria as well, and transferred his seat.

The diocese was suppressed in 1213 by Pope Innocent III, due to the support of the Alessandrians for Emperor Otto IV. The Church of Alessandria had also been refusing to pay the annual tax due to the Roman see, according to a letter of Innocent III of 4 June 1214.

It was restored on 10 May 1240 by Pope Gregory IX, with the bull "Regina Mater", as part of his strategy to defeat Frederick II.

In 1334, the diocese of Alessandria was subjected to an official Visitation by the Vicar General of Archbishop Aicardus of Milan, Canon Eusebius de Tronzano of Vercelli. He collected all the decrees of various synods, and issued them to the canons of Alessandria.

The territory of the diocese of Acqui was united with that of Alessandria until 1405, when Acqui again received its own bishop. In 1287, the archdeacon of Alessandria, Ascherius, attended the provincial synod of Milan, held by Archbishop Otto.

=== Synods ===
A diocesan synod was an irregularly held, but important, meeting of the bishop of a diocese and his clergy. Its purpose was (1) to proclaim generally the various decrees already issued by the bishop; (2) to discuss and ratify measures on which the bishop chose to consult with his clergy; (3) to publish statutes and decrees of the diocesan synod, of the provincial synod, and of the Holy See.

Bishop Pietro Giorgio Odescalchi (1598–1610) held diocesan synods in 1602, 1605, and 1606. Diocesan synods were held in 1613 and 1617 by Bishop Erasmo Paravicini (1611–1640). In 1652, Bishop Deodato Scaglia (1644–1659) presided over a diocesan synod. Bishop Alberto Mugiasca (1680–1694) held a diocesan synod in 1684.

On 16 May 1702, Bishop Carlo Ottaviano Guasco (1695–1704) held a diocesan synod. In October 1711, Bishop Francesco Arborio di Gattinara (1706–1727) held a diocesan synod. On 1–3 May 1732, Bishop Gian Mercurino Antonio Gattinara (1730–1743) presided over a diocesan synod. Bishop Giuseppe Tomaso de Rossi (1757–1786) held a synod in the cathedral on 10–12 June 1771.

Bishop Alessandro d'Angennes (1818–1832) presided over a diocesan synod on 2–4 June 1829.

=== The French occupation ===
The armies of revolutionary France overran northern Italy in 1796. Brief puppet states were established. In 1802, Piedmont was directly annexed by the French state, and French-style départements were established. The territory of Alessandria became part of the Department of Marengo in 1802, and Alessandria itself was named its capital.

One of the policies of the Franch government was the reduction in the number of dioceses both in metropolitan France and in its annexed territories. The French pointed out that there were sixteen dioceses and one metropolitan (Turin) in the Piedmont, of which five were without bishops at the time and three whose bishops had just resigned. They demanded that the sixteen be reduced to eight with one metropolitan. In the bull "Gravissimis Causis" of 1 June 1803, Pope Pius VII authorized the papal legate to First Consul Bonaparte, Cardinal Giovanni Battista Caprara, to suppress a number of dioceses in the ecclesiastical province of Piedmont. Caprara carried out his instructions in a decree of 23 January 1805. The assets of the dioceses of Tortona, Bobbio, and Casale, human and material, were transferred to the diocese of Alessandria.

First Consul Bonaparte had remarked to General Louis-Alexandre Berthier, "With Alessandria in my possession I should always be master of Italy. It might be made the strongest fortress in the world; it is capable of containing a garrison of 40,000 men, with provisions for six months. Should insurrection take place, should Austria send a formidable force here, the French troops might retire to Alessandria, and stand a six months' siege." The medieval cathedral was closed on 6 January 1803 (17 Nivoise XI), and destroyed, on instructions issued in November 1802, to make way for the "Piazza della Libertà".

On 17 March 1805, Napoleon established the Kingdom of Italy, and on 23 May he had himself crowned King of Italy by Cardinal Caprara in the cathedral of Milan. During the rest of the year, he continued to adjust the political arrangements of Piedmont and Lombardy. Having decided that Alessandria needed to be strengthened as a military stronghold and arsenal for his control of the area, he announced on 17 May 1805, his decision to transfer the seat of the bishop of Alessandria to Casale. On 7 July 1805, Cardinal Caprara obligingly carried out a new circumscription, restored the cathedral in Casale to its cathedral status, and moved the bishop to Casale. On 23 December 1805, Bishop Villaret was officially transferred to Casale, and the diocese of Alessandria was suppressed.

The diocese of Alessandria was re-established as an independent ecclesiastical entity by Pope Pius VII on 17 July 1817, as a suffragan of the newly created metropolitan archdiocese of Vercelli.

The diocese was vacant from 1854 to 1867.

== List of Bishops ==
=== to 1500 ===
1175	Arduinus, bishop-elect
1180	Otto
[1180]	[Ubertus]
1205–1213	Ugo Tornielli
1213–1235	Diocese suppressed
	Bonifacius, archdeacon (1235–1280)
	Ascherius, archdeacon (1280–1300)
	Bertholinus, archdeacon (1300–1321)
	Oddo Guasco, archdeacon (1321–1347)
	Antonio Guasco, archdeacon (1347–1351)
	Francesco dal Pozzo, archdeacon (1351–1375)
	Franceschino dal Pozzo, archdeacon (1375–1400)
	Arpino Colli, archdeacon (1400–1405)
1405–1417	Bertolino Beccari, O.E.S.A.
1418–1432	Michele Mantegazza, O.E.S.A.
1432–1441	Sede vacante
1441–1457	Marco Marinoni
1457–1478	Marco de Capitaneis, O.P.
1478–1509	Giovanni Antonio Sangiorgio

=== 1500 to 1800 ===
1500–1517	Alessandro Guasco
1518–1534	Pallavicino Visconti
1534–1564	Ottaviano Guasco
1565–1568	Girolamo Gallarati
1569–1571	Agostino Baglioni
1571–1584	Guarnero Trotti
1584–1596	Ottavio Pallavicini
1596–1610	Pietro Giorgio Odescalchi
1611–1640	Erasmo Paravicini
1641–1643	Francesco Visconti
1644–1659	Deodato Scaglia
1659–1680	Carlo Ciceri
1680–1694	Alberto Mugiasca
1695–1704	Carlo Ottaviano Guasco
1704–1706	Filippo Maria Resta
1706–1727	Francesco Arborio di Gattinara
1727–1729	Carlo Vincenzo Maria Ferreri Thaon (resigned)
1730–1743	Gian Mercurino Antonio Gattinara
1744–1755	Giuseppe Alfonso Miroglio
1757–1786	Giuseppe Tomaso de Rossi
1788–1794	Carlo Giuseppe Pistone
1796–1803	Vincenzo Maria Mossi de Morano

=== since 1805 ===
1805–1814	Gian Crisostomo Villaret
1818–1832	Alessandro d'Angennes (promoted Archbishop of Vercelli)
1833–1854	Dionigi Andrea Pasio (also known as Dionisio-Andrea Pasio)
1854–1867	Sede vacante
1867–1872	Giacomo Antonio Colli
1874–1897	Pietro Giocondo Salvaj (Salvai) di Govone
1897–1918	Giuseppe Capecci
1918–1921	Giosuè Signori (promoted Archbishop of Genoa)
1922–1945	Nicolao (Nicola) Milone
1945–1964	Giuseppe Pietro Gagnor, O.P.
1965–1980	Giuseppe Almici
1980–1989	Ferdinando Maggioni
1989–2007	Fernando Charrier
2007–2011	Giuseppe Versaldi
2012–2026	Guido Gallese

== Parishes ==
The diocese has 74 parishes (2020), all within the Piedmontese province of Alessandria. In 2020, there was one priest for every 2,491 Catholics.

== Books ==
=== Reference works ===
- Gams, Pius Bonifatius (1873). Series episcoporum Ecclesiae catholicae: quotquot innotuerunt a beato Petro apostolo. Ratisbon: Typis et Sumptibus Georgii Josephi Manz. p. 811. (Use with caution; obsolete)
- Eubel, Conradus, ed. (1913). Hierarchia catholica, Tomus 1 (second ed.). Münster: Libreria Regensbergiana. p. 83. (in Latin)
- Eubel, Conradus, ed. (1914). Hierarchia catholica, Tomus 2 (second ed.). Münster: Libreria Regensbergiana. p. 85.
- Eubel, Conradus; Gulik, Guilelmus, eds. (1923). Hierarchia catholica. Vol. 3 (second ed.). Münster: Libreria Regensbergiana. pp. 102–103.
- Gauchat, Patritius (Patrice) (1935). Hierarchia catholica IV (1592–1667). Münster: Libraria Regensbergiana. p. 77.
- Ritzler, Remigius; Sefrin, Pirminus (1952). Hierarchia catholica medii et recentis aevi V (1667–1730). Patavii: Messagero di S. Antonio. p. 77.
- Ritzler, Remigius; Sefrin, Pirminus (1958). Hierarchia catholica medii et recentis aevi VI (1730–1799). Patavii: Messagero di S. Antonio. p. 75.
- Ritzler, Remigius; Sefrin, Pirminus (1968). Hierarchia Catholica medii et recentioris aevi (in Latin). Vol. VII (1800–1846). Monasterii: Libreria Regensburgiana.
- Remigius Ritzler; Pirminus Sefrin (1978). Hierarchia catholica Medii et recentioris aevi (in Latin). Vol. VIII (1846–1903). Il Messaggero di S. Antonio.
- Pięta, Zenon (2002). Hierarchia catholica medii et recentioris aevi (in Latin). Vol. IX (1903–1922). Padua: Messagero di San Antonio. ISBN 978-88-250-1000-8.

=== Studies ===
- Cappelletti, Giuseppe (1858). Le chiese d'Italia: dalla loro origine sino ai nostri giorni (in Italian). Vol. decimoquarto (XIV). Venice: G. Antonelli. pp. 531–562.
- Chenna, Giuseppe Antonio (1785). Del vescovato, de'vescovi e delle chiese della città e diocesi d'Alessandria (in Italian). Alessandria: Ignazio Vimercati. ISBN 9788827157503.
- Christ, Anton (1891). "Unedierte Königs- und Papst- Urkunden," (in German), in: Neues Archiv der Gesellschaft für Ältere Deutsche Geschichtskunde Vol XVI (Hannover: Hahn 1891), pp. 135–168.
- Fiaschini, G. (1970). "La fondazione della diocesi di Alessandria ed i contrasti con i vescovi acquesi," (in Italian), in: Popolo e stato in Italia nell'età di Federico Barbarossa. Alessandria e la Lega Lombarda (Torino 1970), pp. 497–512.
- Gasparolo, Francesco (1900), "Alessandria nel periodo Napoleonico." (in Italian). In: Rivista di storia, arte, archeologia per la provincia di Alessandria, Volume 9 (Alessandria: G. Chiari 1900).
- Gasparolo, Francesco (1904), "La vecchia cattedrale d'Alessandria," (in Italian), in: Rivista di storia, arte, archeologiadella provincia di Alessandria XIII (1904), pp. 187–204.
- Ghilini, Girolamo (1666). Annali di Alessandria, ouero Le cose accadute in essa città nel suo, e circonuicino territorio dall'anno dell'origine sua sino al 1659. (in Italian and Latin). Milano: nella stamparia di Gioseffo Marelli al segno della Fortuna, 1666
- Kehr, Paul Fridolin (1914). Italia pontificia : sive, Repertorium privilegiorum et litterarum a romanis pontificibus ante annum 1598 Italiae ecclesiis, monasteriis, civitatibus singulisque personis concessorum. (in Latin) Vol. VI. pars ii. Berolini: Weidmann.
- Lanzavecchia, Renato (1999). Storia della Diocesi di Alessandria (in Italian). Alessandria editrice. pp. 351 ff.
- Livraghi, Roberto (ed.) (2011). Gli Inizi della Chiesa Alessandrina. (in Italian and Latin). Alessandria: Diocesi di Alessandria, 2011.
- Savio, Fedele (1898). Gli antichi Vescovi d'Italia: il Piemonte (in Italian). Torino: Bocca. pp. 66–68.
- Ughelli, Ferdinando; Coleti, Niccolò (1719). Italia sacra sive De episcopis Italiæ (in Latin). Vol. Tomus quartus (IV). Venice: apud Sebastianum Coleti. pp. 312–331.
