= Noemi Gabrielli =

Italian art historian, superintendent, museologist

- Born: 30 September 1901; Pinerolo
- Died: 9 July 1979 (aged 77); Asti

Noemi Gabrielli (30 September 1901 – 9 July 1979) was an Italian art historian, superintendent, and a museologist.

== Biography ==
Gabrielli was born in Pinerolo and studied in Naples. She then studied in University of Turin, studying under Lionello Venturi. She graduated in 1926 with a thesis about Paolo Veronese. In 1928 she completed a specialization in Art History at the University of Rome.

When she completed her basic degree in 1926 Gabrielli began working to reorganise the art gallery of the Accademia Albertina. She took over after Lionello Venturi's resignation. The display of Gaudenzio Ferrari works was laid out to show the greatest number of works by distributing them in chronological order and dividing them into schools, to offer a comprehensive overview of the historical and artistic context. In 1934 Gabrielli gained the position to become the Superintendent of Medieval and Modern Art of Piedmont and Liguria working as the historical art inspector at the headquarters of the Royal Pinacoteca of Turin in the Art Objects section. In both regions working with Carlo Aru she carried out an in-depth survey and a census of the historical, public and private artistic heritage. They worked together until 1952. Gabrielli was part of the preparation of a Baroque exhibition in 1937 and one of Piedmont Gothic in 1939, both at Palazzo Carignano in Turin.

After the start of the outbreak of the Second World War, There was a plan to protect the Savoy Gallery paintings as well as medieval and Renaissance art objects from churches in the Valle di Susa and Valle d'Aosta. Gabrielli and Aru transferred these works to the Castle of Guiglia. She was also responsible for protecting works of art left in Piedmont and saving those relics damaged in Genoa by RAF bombing. By October 1943, the Guiglia refuge became unsafe. The works were relocated to the original churches they came from. Gabrielli spoke German and convinced the Ministry of Public Education to approve the transfer and talked her way passed obstacles caused by the Nazi occupation of Isola Bella, on Lake Maggiore. She accompanied the crates containing the works of art during night missions. She was awarded a commendation from Carlo Alberto Biggini, Minister of National Education. While saving these works, Gabrielli also wrote the first volume of the work Repertoire of Piedmontese art by Vittorio Viale which was published in 1944.

When the war ended Gabrielli returned to work. She was appointed Superintendent of the Galleries for Piedmont in 1952 when Aru retired. With architect Piero Sampaolesi she rearranged of the gallery in the Academy of Sciences to the renovated rooms of the greenhouses of the Royal Palace. She also led the recovery of Riccardo Gualino works from the Italian Embassy in London. They had been moved there in 1931 as part of the furnishings.

During the 1960s Gabrielli worked on pieces from the Royal Armory and in preparation for the celebration of the centenary Italian unification she was responsible for the arrangement of the Museum of Art and the furnishing of the hunting lodge of Stupinigi. She worked on the 1963 exhibition of Piedmontese Baroque, the Ponzone sculpture museum, the Verbano Historical Museum, the Civic Museums of Casal and the restoration of the frescoes by Giovanni Martino Spanzotti in the church of San Bernardino in Ivrea. Gabrielli retired in 1966. She was awarded the Special Social Centenary Prize in Turin in June 1967 for services in the field of Fine Arts.

Gabrielli died in Asti in 1979. Pinerolo dedicated a street to her in a newly built suburban neighborhood, and the Civic Museum of Casale Monferrato dedicated a room to her.
