= Severino Poletto =

Italian Catholic cardinal (1933–2022)

His Eminence Severino Poletto
- Cardinal, Archbishop of Turin
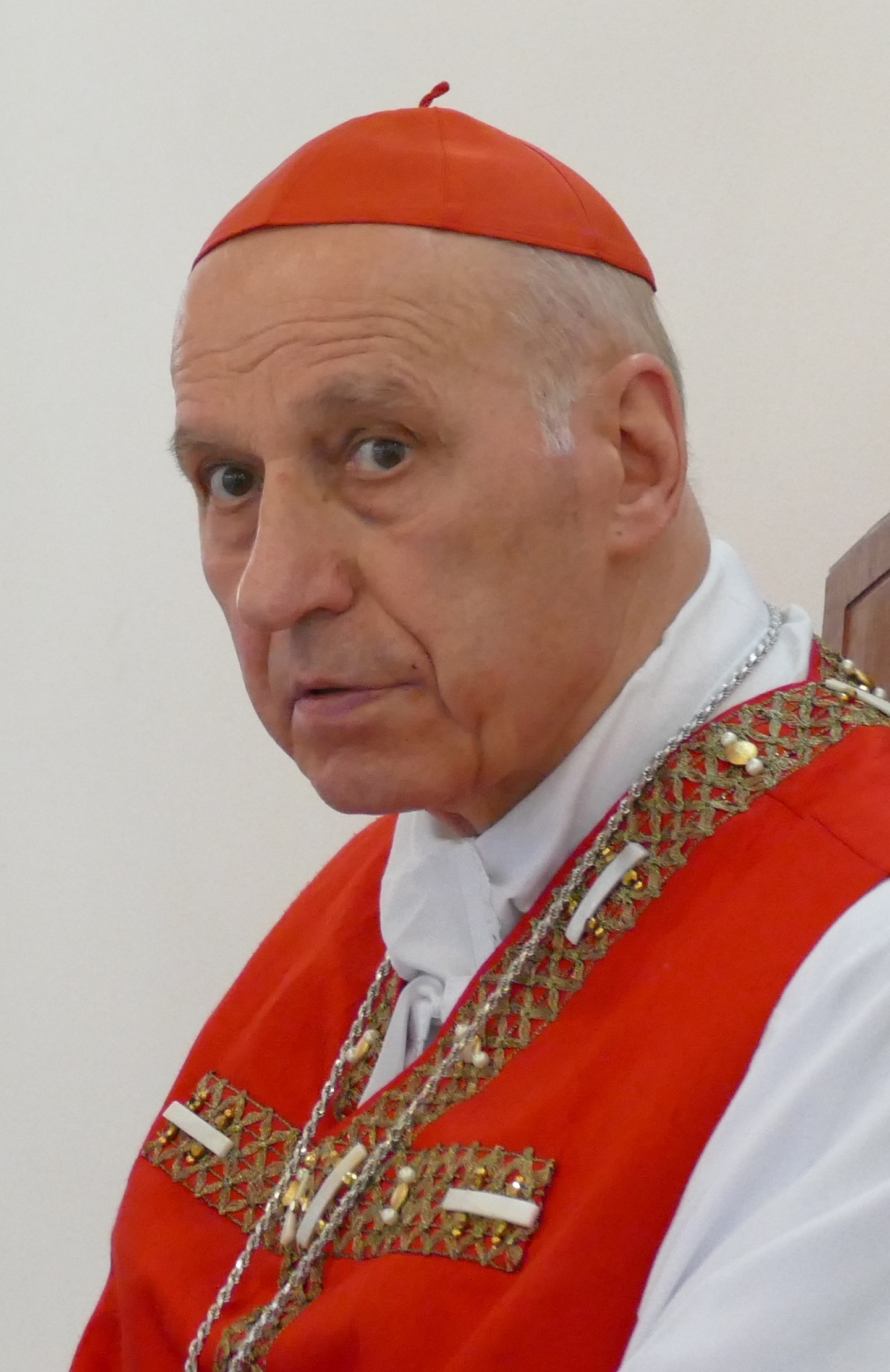
- Poletto in 2015
- Church: Catholic Church
- Archdiocese: Turin
- Appointed: 19 June 1999
- Installed: 5 September 1999
- Term ended: 11 October 2010
- Predecessor: Giovanni Saldarini
- Successor: Cesare Nosiglia
- Other post: Cardinal Priest of San Giuseppe in Via Trionfale (2001–2022)
- Previous posts: Coadjutor Bishop of Fossano (1980); Bishop of Fossano (1980–1989); Bishop of Asti (1989–1999)

Orders
- Ordination: 29 June 1957 by Giuseppe Angrisani
- Consecration: 17 May 1980 by Anastasio Ballestrero
- Created cardinal: 21 February 2001 by John Paul II
- Rank: Cardinal Priest

Personal details
- Born: Severino Poletto; 18 March 1933 Salgareda, Kingdom of Italy
- Died: 17 December 2022 (aged 89) Moncalieri, Italy
- Education: Alphonsian Academy
- Motto: In sequela Christi

Styles of Severino Poletto
- Reference style: His Eminence
- Spoken style: Your Eminence
- Informal style: Cardinal
- See: Turin

Severino Poletto (18 March 1933 – 17 December 2022) was an Italian cardinal of the Catholic Church who served as Archbishop of Turin from 1999 to 2010. A bishop since 1980, he was made a cardinal by Pope John Paul II in 2001.

== Biography ==
Poletto was born in Salgareda, Veneto, on 18 March 1933, the youngest of 11 children, 9 of whom survived infancy. The family emigrated to the Piedmont in search of work in 1952. He studied at the seminary in Treviso and then at the major seminary in Casale Monferrato in the province of Alessandria. He was ordained a priest on 29 June 1957 by Bishop Giuseppe Angrisani of Casale Monferrato. He earned a licentiate in moral theology summa cum laude from the Alphonsian Academy in Rome in 1977 and worked as a curate in Montemagno. In 1965 he was named parish priest in Oltreponte; at the same time he worked part-time in a local factory. In 1973, Poletto founded the Diocesan Centre for Family Ministry.

On 3 April 1980, he was named bishop coadjutor of the Diocese of Fossano. He was consecrated a bishop on 17 May by Cardinal Anastasio Ballestrero, Archbishop of Turin, and succeeded as bishop on 29 October.

Poletto served for ten years as secretary of the Piedmontese Episcopal Conference.

On 16 March 1989, he was named Bishop of Asti and on 19 June 1999 Archbishop of Turin. He was installed in Turin on 9 September.

Pope John Paul II created him Cardinal-Priest of San Giuseppe in Via Trionfale on 21 February 2001. On 15 May John Paul named him a member of the Congregation for the Clergy and on 18 May of the Prefecture for the Economic Affairs of the Holy See and the Pontifical Commission for the Cultural Heritage of the Church.

Poletto was one of the cardinal electors who participated in the 2005 papal conclave that elected Pope Benedict XVI and the 2013 conclave that elected Pope Francis.

Pope Benedict XVI accepted his resignation as Archbishop of Turin on 11 October 2010.

Poletto died in Moncalieri, just south of Turin, on 17 December 2022, at the age of 89.

Catholic Church titles
Preceded by Giovanni Francesco Dadone	Bishop of Fossano; 29 October 1980 – 16 March 1989	Succeeded by Natalino Pescarolo
Preceded by Franco Sibilla	Bishop of Asti; 16 March 1989 – 19 June 1999	Succeeded by Francesco Guido Ravinale
Preceded by Giovanni Saldarini	Archbishop of Turin; 19 June 1999 – 11 October 2010	Succeeded by Cesare Nosiglia
Preceded by Giuseppe Casoria	Cardinal-Priest 'pro hac vice' of San Giuseppe in Via Trionfale; 21 February 2001 – 18 December 2022	Succeeded by Emil Paul Tscherrig
