= Francesco Bertoglio =

Italian Catholic bishop

Francesco Bertoglio (15 February 1900 – 6 July 1977) was an Italian prelate of the Catholic Church who was Rector of the Pontifical Lombard Seminary in Rome for more than twenty-five years and later Auxiliary Bishop of Milan. During World War II he sheltered dozens of Jews and political refugees and helped them evade capture by the Nazis.

== Biography ==
Francesco Bertoglio was born on 15 February 1900 in Magenta, Italy. He studied at the Pontifical Lombard Seminary in Rome, where he joined his fellow student Giovanni Battista Montini, the future Pope Paul VI, on 16 November 1920, arriving late for the start of the term because he was completing his World War I service in the Italian army. He was ordained a priest of the Archdiocese of Milan on 31 March 1923. He continued his studies at the Seminary until 1924, earning a degree in theology. He then returned to Milan where he served as vice-rector of the gymnasium (secondary school) and taught at the seminary. He moved to Rome to lead his alma mater as Rector of the Pontifical Lombard Seminary, beginning on 16 July 1933; he held that post for more than 27 years.

During the Nazi occupation of Rome, the Seminary sheltered more than a hundred Jews and several political refugees. On the night of 21–22 December 1943, the Nazi Koch Band invaded and searched the Seminary building. Bertoglio challenged them and was instrumental in holding them off long enough for most of the people they were after to escape. For his work that night and other assistance in providing shelter and forged documents he was later recognized as Righteous among the Nations by Yad Vashem.

On 1 September 1960, Pope John XXIII named him titular bishop of Paros. He received his episcopal consecration on 28 October 1960 from Pope John. He continued his work at the Seminary for several months, ending his tenure as Rector on 5 January 1961.

He then led the Archconfraternity of SS. Ambrogio and Carlo, an association that had long supported the Seminary. He developed a plan for a seminary similar to the Lombard Seminary but having as its mission the education and spiritual formation of non-Italian clerics nominated by their bishops in an international community. In 1963 he won approval from the Congregation for Seminaries, now the Congregation for Catholic Education, for the proposed institution, to be named the International Ecclesiastical College of Saint Charles Borromeo.

He was also postulator for the cause of Andrea Carlo Ferrari, which was opened 10 February 1963.

In 1964, he became auxiliary bishop of Milan. (Note: According to Cardinal Angelo Scola, Archbishop of Milan, Bertoglio was auxiliary in Milan from his appointment as bishop in 1960.)

Bertoglio died on 6 July 1977 at the age of 77.
