= Pietro Paolo Operti =

Italian painter

Pietro Paolo Operti (1704–1793) was an Italian painter.

He was born in the town of Bra, Piedmont. By report, he trained as a painter in Bologna, but it is not known who he received his training from. He painted for the Chapel of the Risen Christ in the church of the Santissima Trinità in Bra, including the 14 canvases of the Via Crucis (1764–1765) originally painted for the Franciscan friars, but brought to this church in 1795. He also painted canvases including a St Ignatius of Loyola for the Sanctuary of the Madonna dei Fiori, and a Santa Vittoria (1763), originally painted for the Franciscans. He also painted, in collaboration with the quadratura painter Bernardino Barelli, a series of mythological frescoes (1772) for Palazzo Fracassi in Cherasco (1772).

He painted the interior of the church of Santa Chiara in Operti, and four rooms of the Palazzo Valfré in Bonzo and for the church of Santa Maria degli Angeli and the Sanctuary of Madonna dei Fiori in Bra. He died on 7 April 1793 in Bra in the province of Cuneo.
