= Prefecture for the Economic Affairs of the Holy See =

Coordinates: 41.90302°N 12.45842°E

The Prefecture for the Economic Affairs of the Holy See was a dicastery of the Roman Curia, erected on 15 August 1967, and entrusted with overseeing all the offices of the Holy See that managed finances, regardless of their degree of autonomy.

On 30 December 2016, the Prefecture was abolished by Pope Francis, in view of the reforms made by Fidelis dispensator et prudens.

== Description ==
The prefecture did not manage finances itself, but instead audited the balance sheets and budgets of the offices that do. It then prepared and published annually a general financial report. It had to be consulted on all projects of major importance undertaken by the offices in question.

The Vatican Bank, which does not manage property of the Holy See, was not overseen by the Prefecture. This prefecture was also distinct from the Administration of the Patrimony of the Apostolic See, which was formed from the merger of the Administration of the Property of the Holy See and the Special Administration of the Holy See.

== Presidents ==
1. Angelo Dell'Acqua (23 September 1967 – 13 January 1968)
2. Egidio Vagnozzi (13 January 1968 – 26 December 1980)
3. Giuseppe Caprio (30 January 1981 – 22 January 1990)
4. Edmund Szoka (28 April 1990 – 15 October 1997)
5. Sergio Sebastiani (3 November 1997 – 12 April 2008)
6. Velasio de Paolis (12 April 2008 – 21 September 2011)
7. Giuseppe Versaldi (21 September 2011 – 31 March 2015)

== See also ==
- Economy of Vatican City
- Institute for the Works of Religion, commonly known as the Vatican Bank
- Secretariat for the Economy
