= Giovanni Saldarini =

Italian Cardinal and Archbishop

His Eminence Giovanni Saldarini
- Cardinal, Archbishop Emeritus of Turin
- Church: Roman Catholic Church
- Archdiocese: Turin
- See: Turin
- Appointed: 31 January 1989
- Installed: 19 March 1989
- Term ended: 19 June 1999
- Predecessor: Anastasio Alberto Ballestrero
- Successor: Severino Poletto
- Other post: Cardinal-Priest of Sacro Cuore di Gesù a Castro Pretorio "pro hac vice" (1991-2011)
- Previous posts: Titular Bishop of Gaudiaba (1984-89); Auxiliary Bishop of Milan (1984-89)

Orders
- Ordination: 31 May 1947 by Alfredo Ildefonso Schuster
- Consecration: 7 December 1984 by Carlo Maria Martini
- Created cardinal: 28 June 1991 by Pope John Paul II
- Rank: Cardinal-Priest

Personal details
- Born: Giovanni Saldarini; 11 December 1924 Cantù, Como, Kingdom of Italy
- Died: 18 April 2011 (aged 86) Milan, Italy
- Education: Pontifical Biblical Institute
- Motto: Adjutor gaudii vestri
- Coat of arms

Styles of Giovanni Saldarini
- Reference style: His Eminence
- Spoken style: Your Eminence
- Informal style: Cardinal
- See: Turin (emeritus)

Giovanni Saldarini (11 December 1924 – 18 April 2011) was an Italian Cardinal and Archbishop of Turin.

== Early life ==
Saldarini was born in Cantù in the Italian province of Como, in Lombardy. He was educated at St Peter Martyr Seminary in Venegono and the Theological Faculty, Milan. He was ordained to the priesthood on 31 May 1947 in Milan, by Alfredo Schuster then Archbishop of Milan. He taught at the archiepiscopal school in Desio from 1947 until 1949. After further studies in Rome, he was a faculty member at the Seminary of Venegono from 1952 until 1967. After this, he worked as a parish priest in the archdiocese of Milan until 1982. He was named Honorary Prelate on 24 April 1979.

== Episcopate ==
Pope John Paul II appointed him titular bishop of Gaudiaba and auxiliary bishop of Milan on 10 November 1984. He was consecrated that December by Cardinal Carlo Maria Martini, assisted by Cardinal Giovanni Colombo, (then Archbishop Emeritus of Milan). He remained as an auxiliary bishop of Milan until he was appointed Archbishop of Turin on 31 January 1989.

== Cardinal ==
He was created and proclaimed Cardinal Priest of Sacro Cuore di Gesù a Castro Pretorio (deaconry elevated pro hac vice to presbyteral title) in the consistory of 28 June 1991. He resigned the pastoral government of the archdiocese because of bad health, at the age of 74 on 19 June 1999. After his resignation, Saldarini resided in the parish of S. Francesco di Paola, via Montenapoleone. He lost the right to participate in a conclave when he turned 80 years old in 2004. Cardinal Saldarini died on 18 April 2011 in Clinica San Giuseppe, Milan. He was buried in the Cathedral of Turin.

Catholic Church titles
Preceded by Anastasio Ballestrero	Archbishop of Turin; 31 January 1989 – 19 June 1999	Succeeded by Severino Poletto

== Bibliography ==
Martin Bräuer, Handbuch der Kardinäle: 1846-2012 (Berlin/Boston: Walter de Gruyter GmbH & Co KG, 2014).
