= Natalino Pescarolo =

- Bishop of Cuneo
- Church: Catholic Church
- Diocese: Diocese of Cuneo
- In office: 1 February 1999 – 24 August 2005
- Predecessor: Carlo Aliprandi
- Successor: Giuseppe Cavallotto
- Previous posts: Bishop of Fossano (1992-2005); Titular Bishop of Alexanum (1990-1992); Apostolic Administrator of Fossano (1990-1992); Auxiliary Bishop of Cuneo (1990-1992)

Orders
- Ordination: 29 June 1952 by Francesco Imberti
- Consecration: 5 May 1990 by Albino Mensa

Personal details
- Born: 26 March 1929 Palestro, Province of Pavia, Kingdom of Italy
- Died: 4 January 2015 (aged 85) Cuneo, Province of Cuneo, Italy

Natalino Pescarolo (26 March 1929 – 4 January 2015) was an Italian Roman Catholic bishop.

Ordained to the priesthood on 29 June 1952, Pescarolo was named auxiliary bishop of the Diocese of Cuneo in Italy in 1990. In 1992, he was appointed bishop of Fossano and in 1999, he was also appointed bishop of Cuneo.

Pescarolo retired in 2005 and died in 2015.
