= Edoardo Arborio Mella =

Italian architect, restorer and scholar (1808–1884)

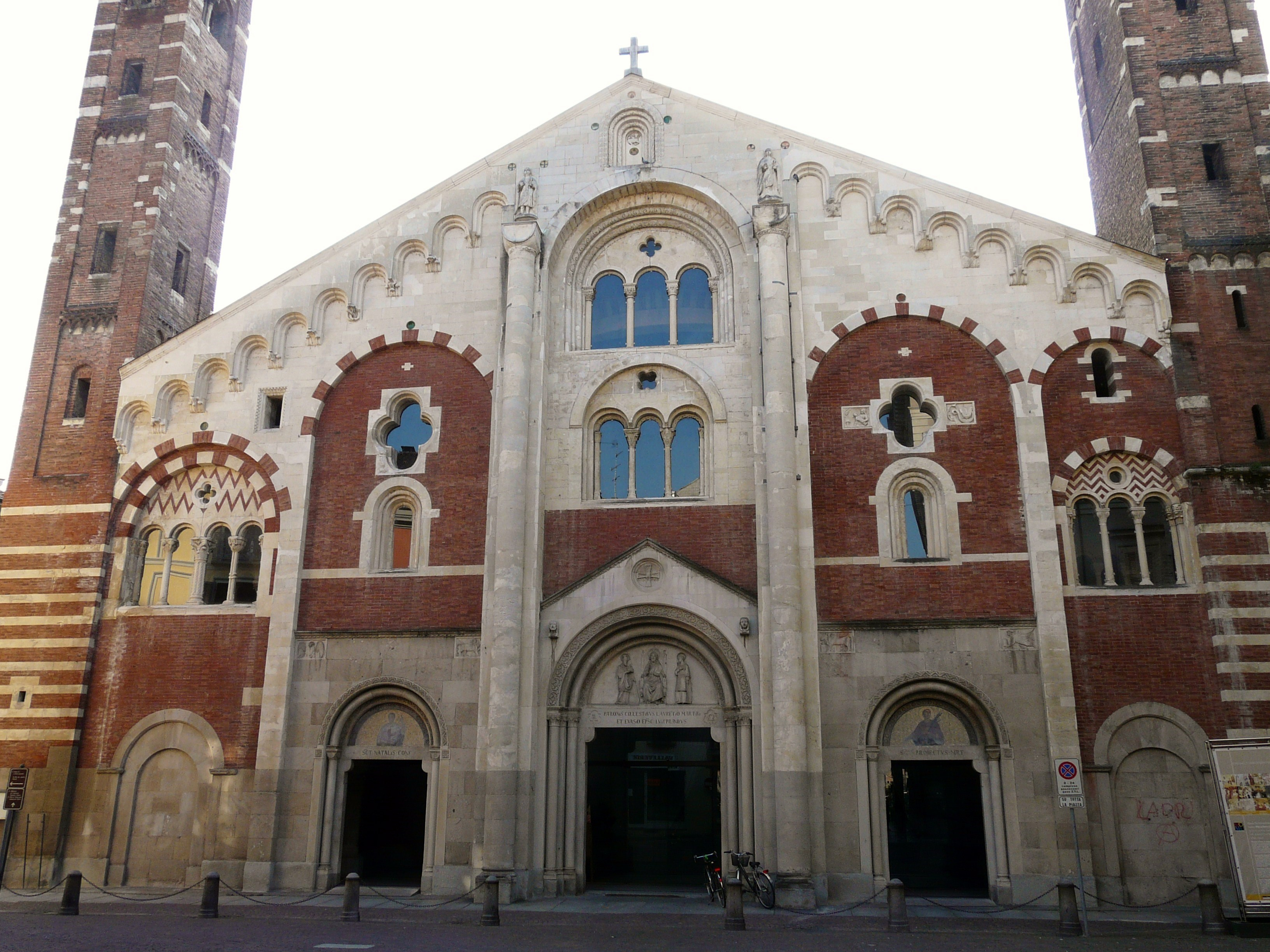
His restoration of Sant’Evasio, the cathedral church of Casale Monferrato, entailed a significant re-modelling of the façade in an antique manner.

Edoardo Arborio Mella (18 November 1808 – 8 January 1884) was an Italian architect, restorer and scholar. Well known at the time for his 'stylish' restorations of medieval buildings in Piedmont, he has been described as 'one of the most representative protagonists of the Gothic Revival in northern Italy'.

== Biography ==
He was born in Vercelli to Count Carlo Emanuele Arborio Mella, who for many years was mayor of Vercelli, and Vittoria Gattinara, daughter of Ludovico count of Zubiena. He was educated first at home. From 1820 to 1827 he attended the Collegio-Convitto del Carmine in Turin, a Jesuit-run boarding school then popular among the Piedmontese aristocracy, where he displayed a particular talent for mathematical subjects.

In 1834 he married Adele Clotilde Olgiati, daughter of Giuseppe Alessandro Olgiati. She died five years later in 1839, having given birth to three children: Carlo Alessandro, Maria Vittoria and Federico. The last of these became an architect and archaeologist and worked on various projects with his father.

Mella's interest in Gothic architecture took him to Switzerland, France and Germany; there were further trips to Monaco, Constantinople, Venice, Berlin, Prague, Budapest, Athens and Vienna.

He was responsible for the nineteenth-century restoration of the Duomo of Casale Monferrato; the works began in 1857 and were completed in 1861. Subsequently, he worked on restorations at Rosignano Monferrato, Mirabello, Villanova Monferrato and of the church of Sant'Ilario in Casale.

Mella's publications included treatises on geometry and architecture and monographs on medieval monuments. His obituary in the Salesian Bulletin of February 1884 points to two works of particular interest: Elementi di architettura archi-acuta o gotica ('Elements of Ogival or Gothic Architecture'; 1857) and Elementi di architettura romano-bizantina, detta lombarda ('Elements of the Romano-Byzantine Architecture called Lombard', 1885).

== Notes ==
The article originated as a translation of this version of its counterpart in the Italian Wikipedia, current on 14 August 2008.
