= Anastasio Ballestrero =

Italian cardinal

Servant of God Anastasio Ballestrero OCD
- Cardinal, Archbishop Emeritus of Turin
- Church: Roman Catholic Church
- Archdiocese: Turin
- See: Turin
- Appointed: 1 August 1977
- Installed: 25 September 1977
- Term ended: 31 January 1989
- Predecessor: Michele Pellegrino
- Successor: Giovanni Saldarini
- Other post: Cardinal-Priest of Santa Maria sopra Minerva (1979-98)
- Previous posts: Archbishop of Bari–Canosa (1973–77); Vice-President of the Italian Episcopal Conference (1978-79); President of the Italian Episcopal Conference (1979-85)

Orders
- Ordination: 6 June 1936 by Carlo Dalmazio Minoretti
- Consecration: 2 February 1974 by Sebastiano Baggio
- Created cardinal: 30 June 1979 by Pope John Paul II
- Rank: Cardinal-Priest

Personal details
- Born: Anastasio Alberto Ballestrero; 3 October 1913 Genoa, Kingdom of Italy
- Died: 21 June 1998 (aged 84) Bocca di Magra, Ameglia, Italy
- Motto: In omnia bonitate et veritate ("In all goodness and truth")
- Coat of arms: Anastasio Ballestrero's coat of arms

Styles of Anastasio Ballestrero OCD
- Reference style: His Eminence
- Spoken style: Your Eminence
- Religious style: Cardinal
- Informal style: Cardinal
- See: Turin

Ordination history of Anastasio Ballestrero
History
Priestly ordination
- Ordained by: Carlo Dalmazio Minoretti
Episcopal consecration
- Principal consecrator: Sebastiano Baggio
- Co-consecrators: Michele Mincuzzi; Enrico Romolo Compagnone, OCD
Cardinalate
- Elevated by: Pope John Paul II
Episcopal succession
Bishops consecrated by Anastasio Ballestrero as principal consecrator
- Vittorio Bernardetto: 7 July 1978
- Severino Poletto: 17 May 1980
- Benigno Luigi Papa, O.F.M. Cap.: 27 December 1981
- Egidio Caporello: 19 September 1982
- Fernando Charrier: 11 November 1984
- Sebastiano Dho: 24 August 1986

Anastasio Alberto Ballestrero (3 October 1913 – 21 June 1998), religious name Anastasio del Santissimo Rosario, was an Italian cardinal and member of the Discalced Carmelites who served as the Archbishop of Turin from 1977 until his resignation in 1989. Ballestrero was elevated to the cardinalate in 1979 and became a leading progressive voice in the Italian episcopate during his time as the head of the Italian Episcopal Conference in the pontificate of the conservative Pope John Paul II. Ballestrero likewise was known for being reserved when it came to the Shroud of Turin as opposed to the enthusiasm of John Paul II for the relic. The cardinal allowed for testing of the shroud and announced that the relic itself was a product of the Middle Ages as opposed to the genuine burial cloth of Jesus Christ.

The beatification process was launched in Turin and he became titled as a Servant of God. The diocesan process for the cause opened in late 2014 and started the collection of testimonies and documents from both Turin and Bari.

== Life ==
=== Childhood and education ===
Alberto Ballestrero was born in Genoa on 3 October 1913 as the first of five children born to Giacomo Ballestrero and Antonietta Daffunchio. He was baptized on 2 November 1913 in the Santa Zita parish with the name "Alberto". His father worked in a Genoese port while his mother oversaw her children's religious formation. Two siblings died in the first few months of their lives. His mother died in 1923 after the birth of her final child in late 1922.

Ballestrero attended a school in Genoa from 1919 to 1922. He was enrolled at the Collegio Belimbau in 1922 before he received his confirmation in the San Martino di Albaro church on 3 May 1923; he made his First Communion the next month on 21 June. He left the Collegio Belimbau in 1923 in order to pursue ecclesial studies to become a priest.

=== Profession and priesthood ===
On 2 October 1924, he commenced his ecclesial studies under the direction of the Discalced Carmelites in Varazze. Ballestrero then joined that religious order in Savona and took both the habit on 12 October 1928 and the religious name Anastasio del Santissimo Rosario. He made his first vows on 17 October 1929 and was later sent to the Genoese convent of Santa Anna in September 1932 for his philosophical and theological studies. But in 1932, he suffered from a life-threatening infection (and recovered in hospital from October to December 1932), before he made his solemn profession on 5 October 1934.

He received the subdiaconate and then the diaconate in 1935, before he received his solemn ordination to the priesthood in the San Lorenzo Cathedral on 6 June 1936 but required a special dispensation for it due to the age requirement. He began teaching philosophical studies at the "studentato" of Genoa-S. Anna from 13 August 1936 and initiated a preaching apostolate in a Genoese hospital (the "Bertani") from 1 January 1937. In the late 1930s, he was in Paris for further studies. Ballestrero was prior of the Santa Anna convent from 22 April 1945 to 1948 and was again elected as prior on 7 May 1954, after becoming the provincial for the Ligurian province of the order on 3 April 1948. Before attending the Second Vatican Council from 1962 to 1965 he was twice elected as the general provost for the order on 9 April 1955 and later on 21 April 1961; he remained in that position until 20 May 1967. Ballestrero visited all 350 Carmelite convents and 850 Carmelite monasteries in the world except in Hungary which refused him entrance into the nation. He once served as President of the Union of Superior Generals. During the Second Vatican Council, he became friends with Henri de Lubac and was considered a close collaborator to the pope.

=== Episcopate and cardinalate ===
On 21 December 1973, he was appointed the Archbishop of Bari. He received his episcopal consecration on in the Santa Teresa church 2 February 1974 in Rome from Cardinal Sebastiano Baggio with Bishops Michele Mincuzzi and Enrico Romolo Compagnone serving as the co-consecrators. Pope Paul VI later named him as the Archbishop of Turin on 1 August 1977; he was enthroned in his new see on the following 25 September. He was later being elected as the Vice-President for the Italian Episcopal Conference on 25 May 1978 and then served as its President from 18 May 1979 to 3 July 1985. In 1975, he preached the Spiritual Exercises to Paul VI and the Roman Curia at the pope's invitation.

Pope John Paul II elevated him into the cardinalate and named him as the Cardinal-Priest of Santa Maria sopra Minerva on 30 June 1979. Ballestrero resigned as the Archbishop of Turin on 31 January 1989 and retired to the Santa Croce convent in La Spezia (though he would still continue to give spiritual retreats); he lost the right to vote in a papal conclave on 3 October 1993 after he turned 80.

Ballestrero attended the various episcopal gatherings that the pope called and he was also appointed as a special papal representative to the inaugural ceremonies of the Theresian Year that commemorated the fourth centennial of the death of Teresa of Avila which was from 14 October until 15 October 1981, in both Alba de Tormes and Ávila. He was a noted theologian and was the author of a range of books of mediations and on John of the Cross.

He became known for his progressive beliefs and he rejected some of the popular Catholic movements such as Communion and Liberation. John Paul II reproached him for this to which he was said to have replied: "Holiness, when you get to know them better, you won't like them either!"

=== Death ===
Ballestrero died at his residence in La Spezia at 3:00pm on 21 June 1998 due to a long illness. His funeral was celebrated on 25 June. He is buried in the San Giuseppe del Deserto church attached to the same Carmelite convent in Varazze that he had entered in 1924.

== Beatification process ==
The Piedmont Bishops announced the intention - in an announcement on 4 February 2014 - that they would seek to initiate the cause for Ballestrero's potential beatification following a unanimous vote on the matter. The first move to launch the cause was to transfer the forum for the diocesan investigation from La Spezia (where the cardinal died) to Turin. The diocesan process was launched on 9 October 2014 in a Mass that Cesare Nosiglia presided over. Thus far there have been over 30 testimonies collected and as of 2015 there were 25 being sought from Bari.

The postulator for this cause is the Discalced Carmelite priest Romano Gambalunga.

== Positions ==
=== Abortion ===
In reference to abortion, the cardinal once declared that the Catholic Church must "never renounce its mission of evangelization and education of the human conscience".

== Shroud of Turin ==
He placed the Shroud of Turin in 1978, on exhibit for the first time in four decades. One of those pilgrims who visited the shroud during this exhibit would be the future Pope John Paul II, who visited just six weeks prior to his election. Ballestrero would later host the pope in Turin, in 1980 with the pope coming to venerate the relic.

Ballestrero agreed to scientific testing being performed on the Shroud of Turin in October 1978 but refused to permit radiocarbon dating testing as it required removing samples from the shroud itself. Once technical improvements made it possible to use samples the size of postage stamps the cardinal permitted samples to be cut in April 1988 which he himself supervised to ensure it was carried out in an appropriate manner. These would be tested in three labs in Oxford, Zürich and Arizona.

Following the radiocarbon dating tests, the cardinal announced on 13 October 1988 that the shroud was dated from the Middle Ages and thus not the actual burial cloth of Christ (he said the findings were 95% accurate); although these tests were later believed to be invalid due to erroneous sampling.

In November 1983, the pope named him as the first pontifical custodian for the shroud.

Catholic Church titles
| Preceded by Enrico Nicodemo | Archbishop of Bari; 21 December 1973–1 August 1977 | Succeeded by Andrea Magrassi, O.S.B. |
| Preceded by Michele Pellegrino | Archbishop of Turin; 1 August 1977–31 January 1989 | Succeeded by Giovanni Saldarini |
| Preceded by Antonio Poma | President of the Italian Episcopal Conference; 18 May 1979–3 July 1985 | Succeeded by Ugo Poletti |
| Preceded by Dino Staffa | Cardinal-Priest of Santa Maria sopra Minerva; 30 June 1979–21 June 1998 | Succeeded by Cormac Murphy-O'Connor |
