= Diocese of Cuneo-Fossano =

Latin Catholic diocese in Italy

Diocese of Cuneo Dioecesis Cuneensis

Catholic
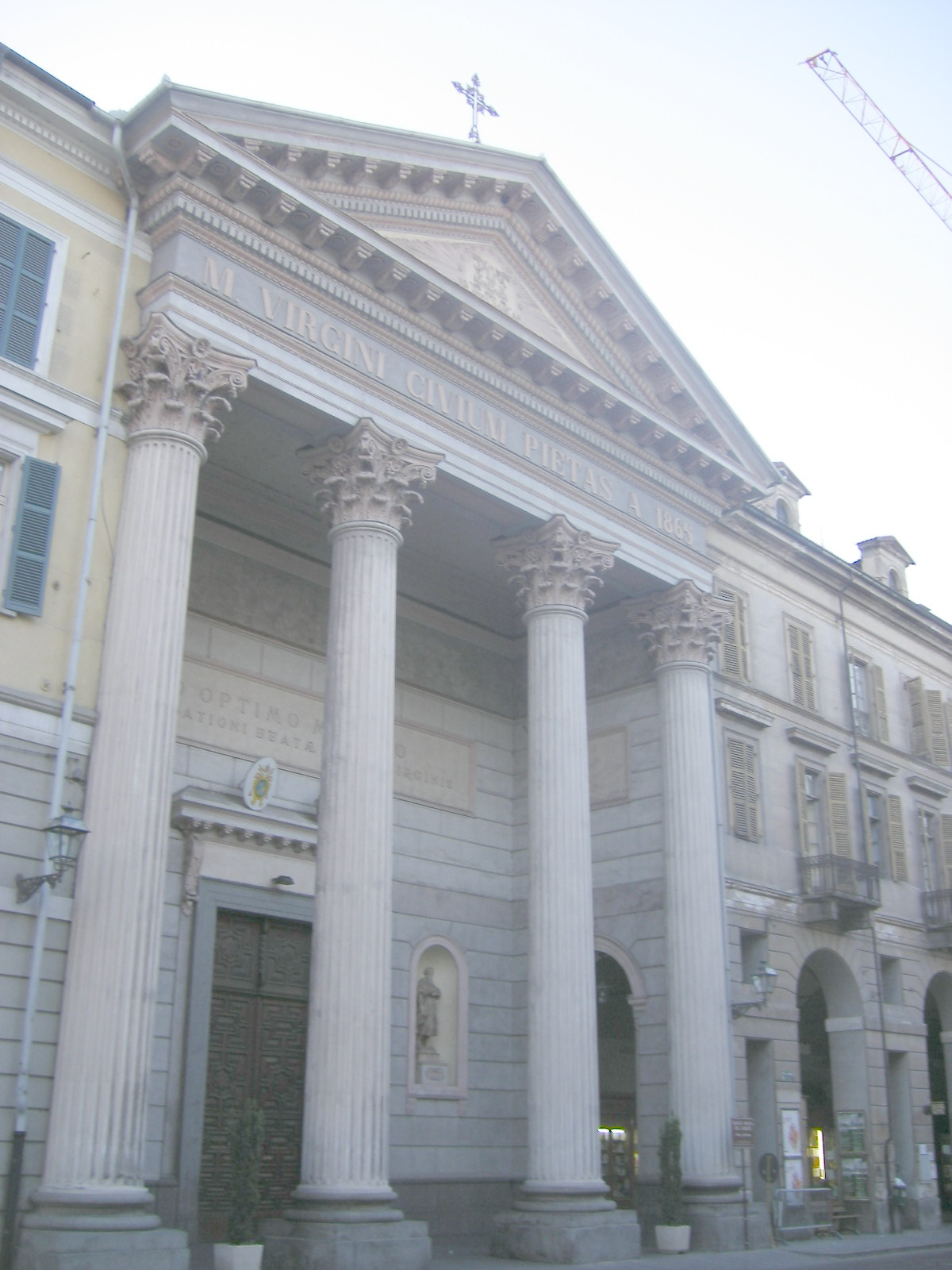
- Cuneo Cathedral

Location
- Country: Italy
- Ecclesiastical province: Turin
- Coordinates: 44.3833°N 7.5500°E

Statistics
- Area: 1,566 km^{2} (605 sq mi)
- Population: Total; Catholics: (as of 2021); 117,000 (Note: Annuario Pontificio (2022) via Catholic-Hierarchy.org); 105,000 (89.7%)
- Parishes: 82

Information
- Denomination: Catholic Church
- Sui iuris church: Latin Church
- Rite: Roman Rite
- Established: 17 July 1817
- Cathedral: Cattedrale di S. Maria del Bosco
- Secular priests: 97 (diocesan); 11 (religious); 6 (deacons)

Current leadership
- Pope: Leo XIV
- Bishop: Piero Delbosco
- Vicar General: Don Sebastiano Carlo Vallati

Map

Website
- diocesicuneofossano.it

The Diocese of Cuneo (Latin: Dioecesis Cuneensis) is a Latin diocese of the Catholic Church in Italy. It was created in 1817, from territory that previously had belonged to the Diocese of Mondovì. It is suffragan of the Archdiocese of Turin. The first bishop of Cuneo was Amedeo Bruno di Samone from 1817 to 1838.

The city of Cuneo is a provincial capital, the metropolis of the civil Province of Cuneo, Piedmont and covered 1,566 square kilometers (604 Square Miles).

== History ==
During the French occupation, religious orders were dissolved or expelled, and convents and monasteries closed and confiscated by the government. In Cuneo this included two monasteries and the convent of the Capuchins. The monastery of S. Annunziata became a hospice for the poor and an orphanage, and the monastery of the Terziarie became first a prison and then a warehouse for salt and a military barracks.

Following the Concordat of 1801 between Bonaparte and Pope Pius VII, the French demanded a reduction in the number of dioceses in Piedmont and their conformity to rules established by the French government. The Pope was compelled to issue a bull, Gravissimis causis (1 June 1803), in which the number of dioceses in Piedmont was reduced to eight: Turin, Vercelli, Ivrea, Acqui, Asti, Mondovi, Alessandria and Saluzzo. This, and the appointment of bishops by Napoleon, caused great confusion, and once Bonaparte had been compelled to abdicate, and the Kingdom of Sardinia was returned to the House of Savoy, a revision of the ecclesiastical situation was essential. The revision was carried out in 1817 by Pope Pius VII in his bull, Beati Petri (17 July 1817). The new diocese of Cuneo was created as diocesan borders were redrawn.

=== Cathedral ===
Before the creation of the diocese, the largest church in the city was the Collegiate Church of S. Maria del Bosco, presided over by a Chapter, consisting of three dignities and fifteen Canons. The church, whose existence is attested as far back as 1446, was severely damaged in the siege of 1744, and was rebuilt through the generosity of King Charles Emmanuel III of Sardinia. The Chapter was suppressed by the papal bull of 1817.

The Chapter of the Cathedral of S. Maria del Bosco consisted of three dignities (Prior, Archpriest, and Provost) and fifteen Canons, one of whom was the Canon Theologus and another the Penitentiary. By 1844 there was a sixteenth Canon.

In 1835 a major outbreak of "asiatic cholera" struck the Ligurian coast, and reached Cuneo in July of that year. Bishop Bruno engaged in heroic relief works.

Restored or newly imported religious communities included: Suore del Cottolengo (1836), Suore della Carità (1843), Compagnia di S. Orsola (1866), Figlie di S. Chiara (1870), Petites Soeurs des Pauvres (1883-1983), PR Gesuiti (1888), Suore di S. Vincenzo (1899), Figli della Divina Provvidenza di Don Orione (1907-1997), Figlie di S. Giuseppe - Suore Ostiarie (1900), PE Salesiani (1928), Suore della Misericordia di Savona (1937), Figlie di M. Ausiliatrice (1937), Figlie del Cuore di Maria (1945), Suore di S. Marta (1948), Suore della S. Famiglia di Savigliano (1952), Suore Francescane (1954-1975). Currently at work in the diocese are a large number of institutes of religion.

Seminarians of the diocese of Cuneo are sent to the Seminario Interdiocesano in Fossano.

== Bishops of Cuneo ==
[A list of bishops of Cuneo is provided by the Diocese of Cuneo]

1. Amedeo Bruno di Samone (1817-1838)
2. Giuseppe Agostino Salomoni, C.M. (1840-1843)
3. Clemente (da Santa Teresa) Manzini, O. Carm. (1844-1865)
4. Andrea Formica (1844-1865)
5. Teodoro Valfrè di Bonzo (1885-1895)
6. Andrea Fiore (1895-1914)
7. Gabriele Natale Moriondo, O.P. (1914-1920)
8. Giuseppe Castelli (1920-1924)
9. Quirico Travaini (1926-1934)
10. Giacomo Rosso (1934-1957)
11. Guido Tonetti (1957-1971)
12. Carlo Aliprandi (1971-1999)
13. Natalino Pescarolo (1999-2005)
14. Giuseppe Cavallotto (2005-2015)
15. Piero Delbosco (2005-present)

== Parishes ==
The diocese has 82 parishes, all within the Province of Cuneo in the (civil) region of Piedmont.

== See also ==
- In persona episcopi
- Catholic Church in Italy

== Bibliography ==
- Casalis, Goffredo, ed. (1839). Dizionario geografico storico-statistico-commerciale degli Stati di S. M. il Re di Sardegna (in Italian). Vol. V. Torino: Cassone Marzorati Vercellotti tipografi. pp. 725–801.
- Gams, Pius Bonifatius (1873). Series episcoporum Ecclesiae catholicae: quotquot innotuerunt a beato Petro apostolo. Ratisbon: Typis et Sumptibus Georgii Josephi Manz. pp. . (in Latin)
- Gazzola, Gian Michele (ed.) (1992). Il Duomo di Cuneo. Santa Maria del Bosco da priorato benedettino a Cattedrale. Cuneo: Primalpe Edizioni 1992. (in Italian)
- Gazzola, Gian Michele (ed.) (1998). Cuneo: una Diocesi e una città. Atlante storico-artistico delle istituzioni ecclesiali nel territorio del Comune di Cuneo. Cuneo: Ed. Diocesi di Cuneo, 1998. (in Italian)
- Maccario, Sebastiano (1889). Cronologia storica della città di Cuneo dalla sua fondazione sino ai dì nostri (in Italian). Cuneo: Tip. Subalpina.
- Ritzler, Remigius; Sefrin, Pirminus (1968). Hierarchia Catholica medii et recentioris aevi sive summorum pontificum, S. R. E. cardinalium, ecclesiarum antistitum series... A pontificatu Pii PP. VII (1800) usque ad pontificatum Gregorii PP. XVI (1846) (in Latin). Vol. VII. Monasterii: Libr. Regensburgiana.
- Remigius Ritzler; Pirminus Sefrin (1978). Hierarchia catholica Medii et recentioris aevi... A Pontificatu PII PP. IX (1846) usque ad Pontificatum Leonis PP. XIII (1903) (in Latin). Vol. VIII. Il Messaggero di S. Antonio.
- Pięta, Zenon (2002). Hierarchia catholica medii et recentioris aevi... A pontificatu Pii PP. X (1903) usque ad pontificatum Benedictii PP. XV (1922) (in Latin). Vol. IX. Padua: Messagero di San Antonio. ISBN 978-88-250-1000-8.
