= Cardinals created by John Paul II =

Catholic appointments from 1979 to 2003

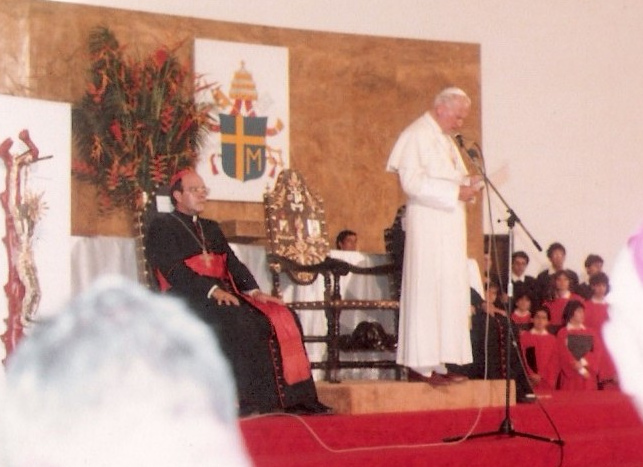
Pope John Paul II (1920–2005) with Cardinal Alfonso López Trujillo (1935–2008)

Pope John Paul II (r. 1978–2005) created 231 cardinals in nine consistories held at roughly three-year intervals. Three of those cardinals were first created in pectore, that is, without their names being announced, and only identified by the pope later. He named a fourth in pectore as well but never revealed that name. At his 2001 consistory, where he elevated 42 prelates and announced the names of two created in pectore earlier, he created more cardinals at one time than ever before or since. His consistories in 1985, 1994, and 2003 were among the largest ever.

In his first three consistories, John Paul adhered to the limit of 120 that Pope Paul VI set on the number of cardinal electors in 1975. and he included that maximum when he reformed the papal conclave procedures in 1996. His appointments exceeded that number for the first time in 1988 when the number of electors rose to 121, and then again in 1998 when it reached 122. In each of his last two consistories, in 2001 and 2003, he raised the number to 135, a record figure only exceeded once, by Pope Francis in 2023.

He was the first pope to allow someone not a bishop to become a cardinal since Pope John XXIII mandated that cardinals be bishops in 1962. His appointments included one future pope, Pope Francis.

== 30 June 1979 ==
John Paul created fourteen cardinals at his first consistory and he announced he was withholding the name of a fifteenth. That additional cardinal's name was not made public until 1991. All those named were archbishops, including six Italians and two Poles. These appointments, excluding the name withheld, brought the number of cardinals who had not passed their 80th birthday to 120, the maximum set by Pope Paul VI, while the entire membership of the College of Cardinals reached 135.

Name	Title when named cardinal	Country
Agostino Casaroli (1914–1998)	Pro-Secretary of State of Secretariat of State	Italy
Giuseppe Caprio (1914–2005)	Pro-President of the Administration of the Patrimony of the Apostolic See	Italy
Marco Cé (1925–2014)	Patriarch of Venice	Italy
Egano Righi-Lambertini (1906–2000)	Apostolic Nuncio to France	Italy
Joseph-Marie Trịnh Văn Căn (1921–1990)	Archbishop of Hanoi	Vietnam
Ernesto Civardi (1906–1989)	Secretary of the Congregation for Bishops	Italy
Ernesto Corripio y Ahumada (1919–2008)	Archbishop of Mexico	Mexico
Joseph Asajiro Satowaki (1904–1996)	Archbishop of Nagasaki	Japan
Roger Etchegaray (1922–2019)	Archbishop of Marseille	France
Anastasio Ballestrero (1913–1998)	Archbishop of Turin	Italy
Tomás Ó Fiaich (1923–1990)	Archbishop of Armagh	Ireland
Gerald Emmett Carter (1912–2003)	Archbishop of Toronto	Canada
Franciszek Macharski (1927–2016)	Archbishop of Kraków	Poland
Władysław Rubin (1917–1990)	Secretary General of the Synod of Bishops	Poland

=== Cardinal in pectore ===
Name	Title when named cardinal	Country	Revealed as Cardinal
Ignatius Kung Pin-mei (1901–2000)	Bishop of Shanghai	China	29 May 1991

== 2 February 1983 ==
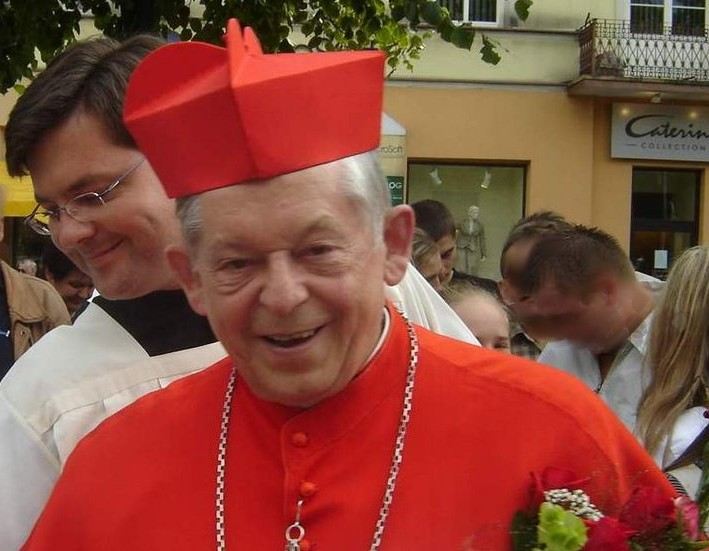
Józef Glemp (1929–2013), made a cardinal on 2 February 1983.

John Paul created 18 cardinals on 2 February 1983, including the first resident of the Soviet Union (Vaivods of Latvia) and four others from countries with Communist governments. This brought the college to 138 members, of whom 120 were young enough to serve as electors in a papal conclave. Another cardinal was created in pectore or secretly. John Paul granted a dispensation from the requirement that all cardinals be bishops to Henri de Lubac, the first such dispensation since Pope John XXIII established the rule in 1962.

Name	Title when named cardinal	Country
Anthony Peter Khoraish (1907–1994)	Patriarch of Antioch of the Maronites	Lebanon
Bernard Yago (1916–1997)	Archbishop of Abidjan	Ivory Coast
Aurelio Sabattani (1912–2003)	Pro-Prefect of the Apostolic Signatura	Italy
Franjo Kuharić (1919–2002)	Archbishop of Zagreb	Yugoslavia
Giuseppe Casoria (1908–2001)	Pro-Prefect of Sacred Congregation for Sacraments and Divine Worship	Italy
José Lebrún Moratinos (1919–2001)	Archbishop of Caracas	Venezuela
Joseph Bernardin (1928–1996)	Archbishop of Chicago	United States
Michael Michai Kitbunchu (b. 1929)	Archbishop of Bangkok	Thailand
Alexandre do Nascimento (1925–2024)	Archbishop of Lubango	Angola
Alfonso López Trujillo (1935–2008)	Archbishop of Medellín	Colombia
Godfried Danneels (1933–2019)	Archbishop of Mechelen–Brussels	Belgium
Thomas Williams (1930–2023)	Archbishop of Wellington	New Zealand
Carlo Maria Martini (1927–2012)	Archbishop of Milan	Italy
Jean-Marie Lustiger (1926–2007)	Archbishop of Paris	France
Józef Glemp (1929–2013)	Archbishop of Warsaw and Archbishop of Gniezno	Poland
Julijans Vaivods (1895–1990)	Apostolic Administrator of Riga and Apostolic Administrator of Liepāja	Soviet Union
Joachim Meisner (1933–2017)	Bishop of Berlin	West Germany
Henri de Lubac (1896–1991)	Theologian	France

== 25 May 1985 ==
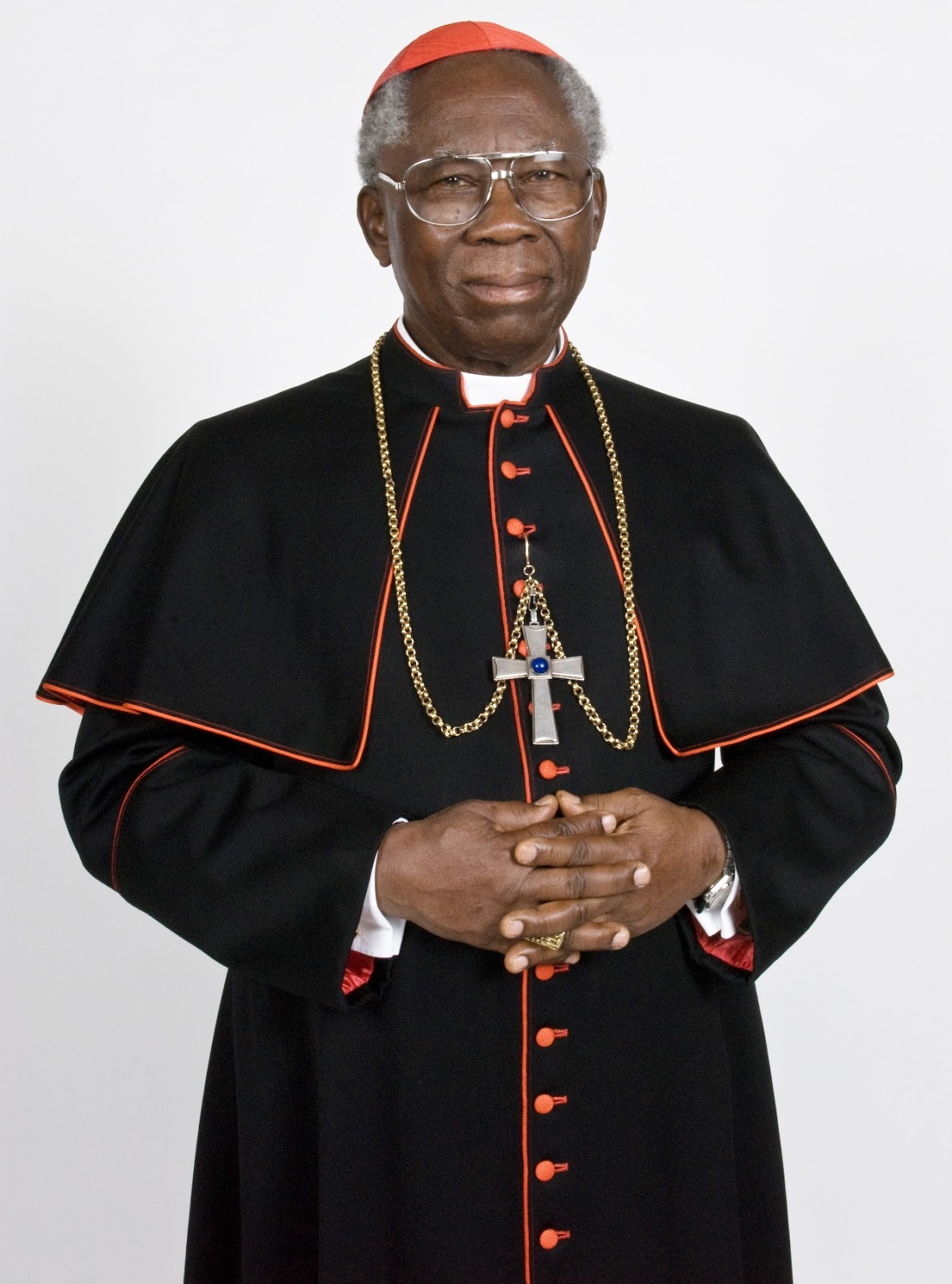
Francis Arinze (born 1932), made a cardinal on 25 May 1985

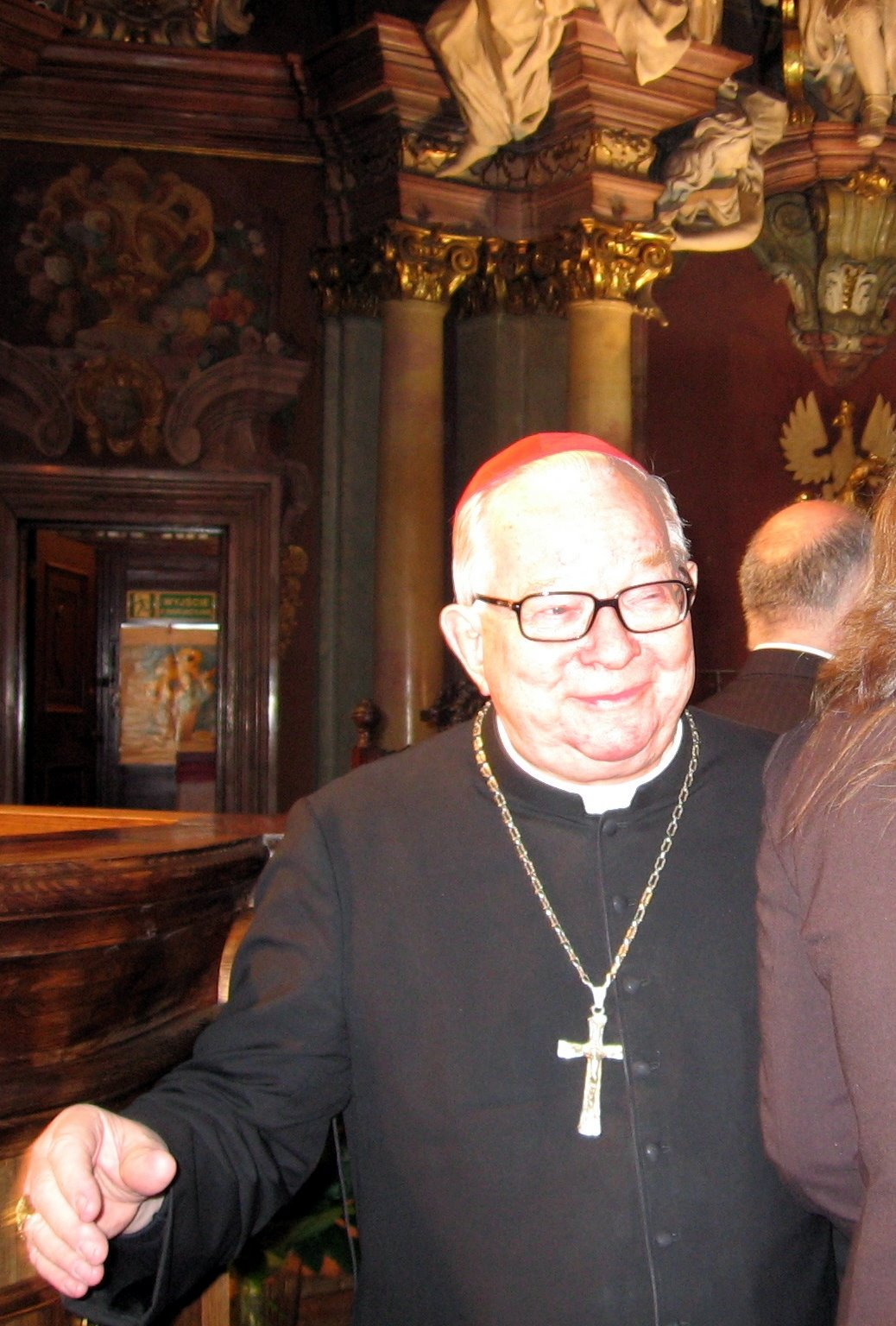
Henryk Gulbinowicz (1923–2020), made a cardinal on 25 May 1985

John Paul created 28 cardinals on 25 May 1985 in a ceremony held outdoors for the first time in St. Peter's Square. They included the first from Ethiopia and Nicaragua and an archbishop of the Ukrainian Rite. It raised the college's membership to 152, with 120 eligible to vote for a new pope.

Name	Title when named cardinal	Country
Luigi Dadaglio (1914–1990)	Major Pro-Penitentiary of the Apostolic Penitentiary	Italy
Duraisamy Simon Lourdusamy (1924–2014)	Secretary of Congregation for the Propagation of the Faith	India
Francis Arinze (b. 1932)	Pro-President of Secretariat for Non-Christians	Nigeria
Juan Francisco Fresno (1914–2004)	Archbishop of Santiago	Chile
Antonio Innocenti (1915–2008)	Apostolic Nuncio to Spain	Italy
Miguel Obando y Bravo (1926–2018)	Archbishop of Managua	Nicaragua
Paul Mayer (1911–2010)	Pro-Prefect of Congregation for Divine Worship and Pro-Prefect of Congregation for the Sacraments	West Germany
Ángel Suquía Goicoechea (1916–2006)	Archbishop of Madrid	Spain
Jean Jérôme Hamer (1916–1996)	Pro-Prefect of Congregation for the Religious and Secular Institutes	Belgium
Ricardo Vidal (1931–2017)	Archbishop of Cebu	Philippines
Henryk Gulbinowicz (1923–2020)	Archbishop of Wrocław	Poland
Paulos Tzadua (1921–2003)	Archbishop of Addis Abeba	Ethiopia
Jozef Tomko (1924–2022)	Pro-Prefect of Congregation for the Propagation of the Faith	Czechoslovakia
Myroslav Ivan Lubachivsky (1914–2000)	Major-Archbishop of Lviv-Galicia	Soviet Union
Andrzej Maria Deskur (1924–2011)	President emeritus of Pontifical Commission for Social Communications	Poland
Paul Poupard (b. 1930)	Pro-President of Secretariat for Non-Believers	France
Louis-Albert Vachon (1912–2006)	Archbishop of Quebec	Canada
Albert Decourtray (1923–1994)	Archbishop of Lyon	France
Rosalio Lara (1922–2007)	President of Disciplinary Commission of the Roman Curia	Venezuela
Friedrich Wetter (b. 1928)	Archbishop of Munich and Freising	West Germany
Silvano Piovanelli (1924–2016)	Archbishop of Firenze	Italy
Adrianus Johannes Simonis (1931–2020)	Archbishop of Utrecht	Netherlands
Édouard Gagnon (1918–2007)	Pro-President of Pontifical Council for the Family	Canada
Alfons Maria Stickler (1910–2007)	Librarian of the Vatican Apostolic Library & Archivist of the Vatican Secret Archives	Austria
Bernard Francis Law (1931–2017)	Archbishop of Boston	United States
John Joseph O'Connor (1920–2000)	Archbishop of New York	United States
Giacomo Biffi (1928–2015)	Archbishop of Bologna	Italy
Pietro Pavan (1903–1994)	Rector Magnificus Emeritus of the Pontifical Lateran University	Italy

== 28 June 1988 ==
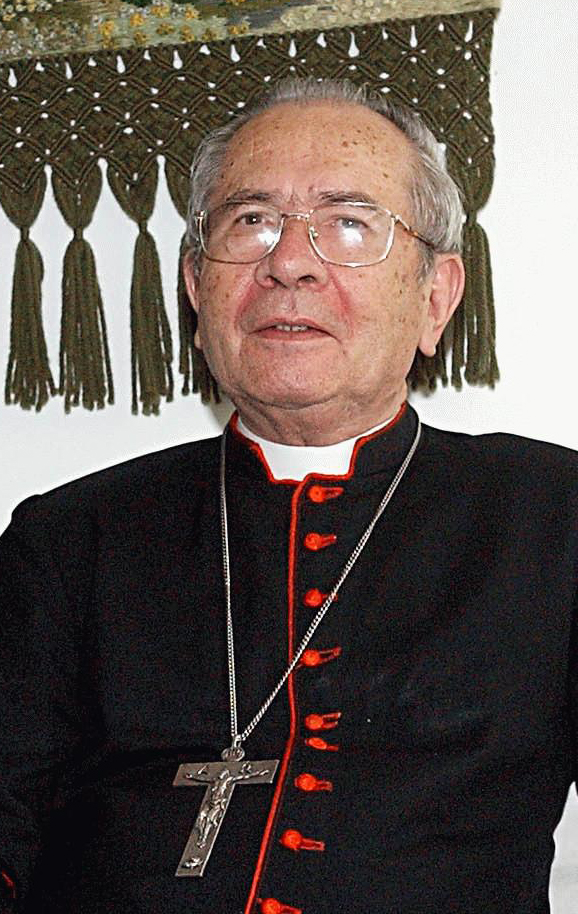
José Freire Falcão (1925–2021), made a cardinal on 28 June 1988.

On 29 May 1988 John Paul announced he would create 25 new cardinals in 28 June, though the death of Hans Urs von Balthasar of Switzerland reduced that number to 24. This consistory took the number of cardinal electors from 97 to 121, which fell within a month to the maximum of 120, a majority of them appointed by John Paul. (Note: Cardinal Corrado Ursi turned 80 on 28 July.) It brought the total number of cardinals to a new high of 160, of whom John Paul named 84.

Name	Title when named cardinal	Country
Eduardo Martínez Somalo (1927–2021)	Substitute for General Affairs emeritus of Secretariat of State	Spain
Achille Silvestrini (1923–2019)	Secretary of Council for the Public Affairs of the Church	Italy
Angelo Felici (1919–2007)	Apostolic Nuncio to France	Italy
Paul Grégoire (1911–1993)	Archbishop of Montreal	Canada
Antony Padiyara (1921–2000)	Archbishop of Ernakulam	India
José Freire Falcão (1925–2021)	Archbishop of Brasilia	Brazil
Michele Giordano (1930–2010)	Archbishop of Napoli	Italy
Alexandre José Maria dos Santos (1924–2021)	Archbishop of Maputo	Mozambique
Giovanni Canestri (1918–2015)	Archbishop of Genova–Bobbio	Italy
Antonio María Javierre Ortas (1921–2007)	Secretary emeritus of Congregation for Catholic Education	Spain
Simon Pimenta (1920–2013)	Archbishop of Genova–Bombay	India
Mario Revollo Bravo (1919–1995)	Archbishop of Bogota	Colombia
Edward Bede Clancy (1923–2014)	Archbishop of Sydney	Australia
Lucas Moreira Neves (1925–2002)	Archbishop of São Salvador da Bahia	Brazil
James Aloysius Hickey (1920–2004)	Archbishop of Washington	United States
Edmund Szoka (1927–2014)	Archbishop of Detroit	United States
László Paskai (1927–2015)	Archbishop of Esztergom	Hungary
Christian Tumi (1930–2021)	Archbishop of Garoua	Cameroon
Hans Hermann Groër (1919–2003)	Archbishop of Vienna	Austria
Jacques-Paul Martin (1908–1992)	Prefect emeritus of Prefecture of the Papal Household	France
Franz Hengsbach (1910–1991)	Bishop of Essen	West Germany
Vincentas Sladkevičius (1920–2000)	Apostolic Administrator of Kaišiadorys	Soviet Union
Jean Margéot (1916–2009)	Bishop of Port-Louis	Mauritius
John Wu (1925–2002)	Bishop of Hong Kong	Hong Kong

== 28 June 1991 ==
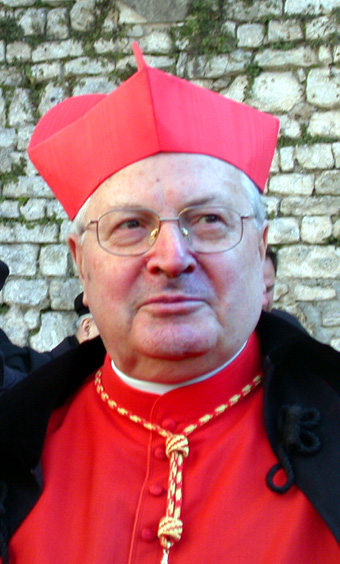
Angelo Sodano (1927–2022), made a cardinal on 28 June 1991.

On 29 May 1991, John Paul announced he would create 22 cardinals at a consistory on 28 June and revealed the name of one he had created in pectore in 1979, Ignatius Kung Pin-mei. This increased the number of cardinal electors to 120 from 100. It also raised to 13 the number cardinals from the Soviet Union and nations of the recently dissolved Warsaw Pact. The total number of cardinals reached 162 after the consistory. (Note: 160 cardinals at 1988 consistory minus 21 cardinals who died before the 1991 consistory (Volk, Guyot, Dearden, de Fürstenberg, Cooray, Nasalli Rocca di Corneliano, Siri, Malula, Manning, Flahiff, Civardi, Ó Fiaich, Trịnh Văn Căn, Vaivods, Maurer, Dadaglio, Rubin, Beras Rojas, Freeman, Nsubuga, Hengsbach) plus 22 newly-appointed cardinals plus 1 revealed cardinal in pectore Kung Pin-mei.)

Name	Title when named cardinal	Country
Angelo Sodano (1927–2022)	Pro-Secretary of State of Secretariat of State	Italy
Alexandru Todea (1912–2002)	Major Archbishop of Făgăraș and Alba Iulia	Romania
Pio Laghi (1922–2009)	Pro-Prefect of Congregation for Catholic Education (for Seminaries and Educational Institutions)	Italy
Edward Cassidy (1924–2021)	President of Pontifical Council for Promoting Christian Unity and President of Commission for Religious Relations with the Jews	Australia
Robert-Joseph Coffy (1920–1995)	Archbishop of Marseille	France
Frédéric Etsou-Nzabi-Bamungwabi (1930–2007)	Archbishop of Kinshasa	Zaire
Nicolás de Jesús López Rodríguez (b. 1936)	Archbishop of Santo Domingo	Dominican Republic
Jose Tomas Sanchez (1920–2012)	Secretary of Congregation for the Evangelisation of Peoples	Philippines
Virgilio Noè (1922–2011)	Coadjutor Vicar General for the Vatican City State of Rome, Coadjutor President of Fabric of Saint Peter and Coadjutor Archpriest of Papal Basilica of Saint Peter	Italy
Antonio Quarracino (1923–1998)	Archbishop of Buenos Aires	Argentina
Fiorenzo Angelini (1916–2014)	President of Pontifical Council for Health Care Workers	Italy
Roger Mahony (b. 1936)	Archbishop of Los Angeles	United States
Juan Jesús Posadas Ocampo (1926–1993)	Archbishop of Guadalajara	Mexico
Anthony Bevilacqua (1923–2012)	Archbishop of Philadelphia	United States
Giovanni Saldarini (1924–2011)	Archbishop of Turin	Italy
Cahal Daly (1917–2009)	Archbishop of Armagh	Ireland
Camillo Ruini (1931–2026)	Pro-Archpriest of Papal Archbasilica of Saint John Lateran and Pro-Vicar General for the Vicariate of Rome	Italy
Ján Chryzostom Korec (1924–2015)	Bishop of Nitra	Czechoslovakia
Henri Schwery (1932–2021)	Bishop of Sion	Switzerland
Georg Sterzinsky (1936–2011)	Archbishop of Berlin	Germany
Guido del Mestri (1911–1993)	Apostolic Nuncio (retired)	Italy
Paolo Dezza (1901–1999)	Pontifical Delegate emeritus for Society of Jesus	Italy

== 26 November 1994 ==
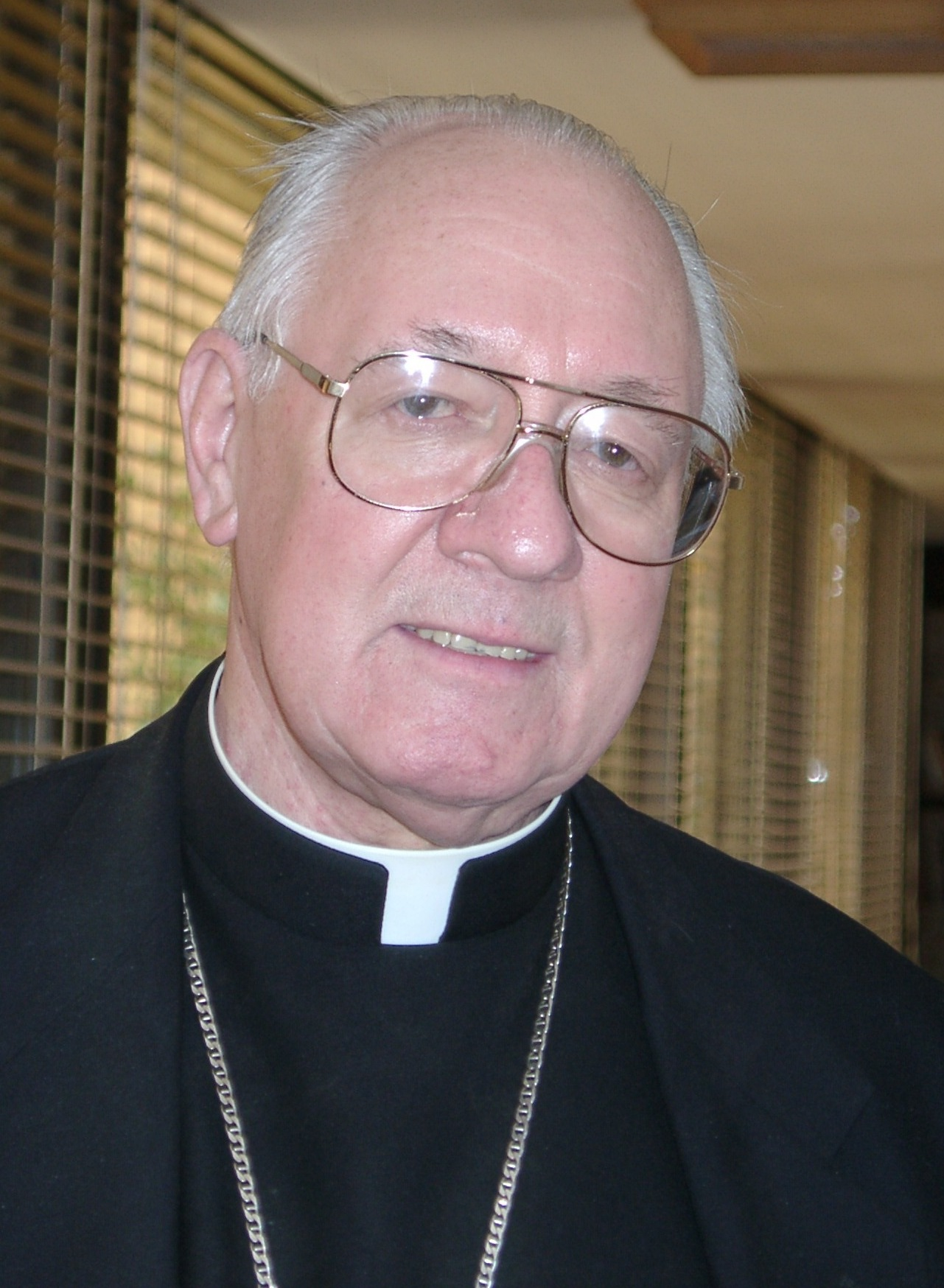
Jan Pieter Schotte (1928–2005), made a cardinal on 26 November 1994

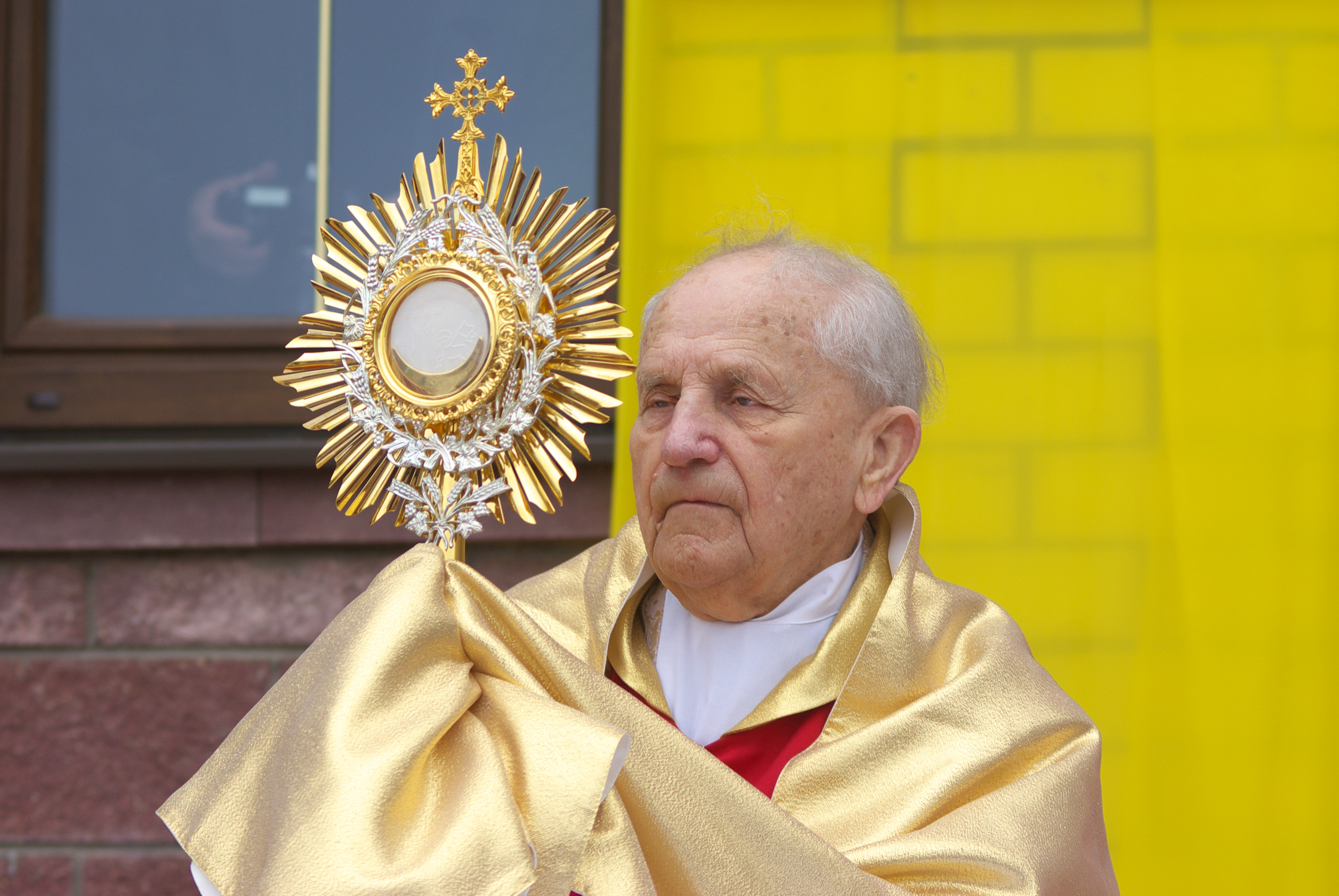
Kazimierz Świątek (1914–2011), made a cardinal on 26 November 1994

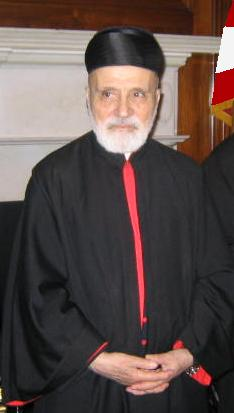
Nasrallah Boutros Sfeir (1920–2019), made a cardinal on 26 November 1994

On 30 October 1994, John Paul announced the names of 30 new cardinals from 24 countries, scheduling the consistory for 26 November. He said others were deserving but he "thought it appropriate to adhere to the limit set by my Predecessor Paul VI". The total number of cardinals reached 167 after the consistory. (Note: 162 cardinals at 1991 consistory minus 25 cardinals who died before the 1994 consistory (Salazar López, de Lubac, Léger, Guerri, Colombo, Paupini, Tomášek, Martin, Picachy, Baggio, Posadas Ocampo, Antonelli, Gray, del Mestri, Carpino, Razafimahatratra, Grégoire, Garrone, Darmojuwono, Cordeiro, Marty, McCann, Muñoz Vega, Khoraish, Decourtray) plus 30 newly-appointed cardinals.)

Name	Title when named cardinal	Country
Nasrallah Boutros Sfeir (1920–2019)	Patriarch of Antioch of the Maronites	Lebanon
Miloslav Vlk (1932–2017)	Archbishop of Prague	Czech Republic
Luigi Poggi (1917–2010)	Librarian of the Vatican Apostolic Library & Archivist of the Vatican Secret Archives	Italy
Peter Shirayanagi (1928–2009)	Archbishop of Tokyo	Japan
Vincenzo Fagiolo (1918–2000)	President of Pontifical Council for the Interpretation of Legislative Texts and President of Disciplinary Commission of the Roman Curia	Italy
Carlo Furno (1921–2015)	Apostolic Nuncio to Italy	Italy
Carlos Oviedo Cavada (1927–1998)	Archbishop of Santiago	Chile
Thomas Winning (1925–2001)	Archbishop of Glasgow	United Kingdom
Adolfo Suárez Rivera (1927–2008)	Archbishop of Monterrey	Mexico
Jaime Lucas Ortega y Alamino (1936–2019)	Archbishop of La Habana	Cuba
Julius Darmaatmadja (b. 1934)	Archbishop of Semarang	Indonesia
Jan Pieter Schotte (1928–2005)	Secretary General of General Secretariat of the Synod of Bishops	Belgium
Pierre Eyt (1934–2001)	Archbishop of Bordeaux	France
Gilberto Agustoni (1922–2017)	Pro-Prefect of Supreme Tribunal of the Apostolic Signatura	Switzerland
Emmanuel Wamala (b. 1926)	Archbishop of Kampala	Uganda
William Henry Keeler (1931–2017)	Archbishop of Baltimore	United States
Augusto Vargas Alzamora (1922–2000)	Archbishop of Lima	Peru
Jean-Claude Turcotte (1936–2015)	Archbishop of Montreal	Canada
Ricardo María Carles Gordó (1926–2013)	Archbishop of Barcelona	Spain
Adam Maida (b. 1930)	Archbishop of Detroit	United States
Vinko Puljić (b. 1945)	Archbishop of Vrhbosna	Bosnia and Herzegovina
Armand Razafindratandra (1925–2010)	Archbishop of Antananarivo	Madagascar
Phạm Đình Tụng (1919–2009)	Archbishop of Hanoi	Vietnam
Juan Sandoval Íñiguez (b. 1933)	Archbishop of Guadalajara	Mexico
Bernardino Echeverría Ruiz (1912–2000)	Archbishop Emeritus of Guayaquil	Ecuador
Kazimierz Świątek (1914–2011)	Archbishop of Minsk–Mohilev	Belarus
Ersilio Tonini (1914–2013)	Archbishop Emeritus of Ravenna-Cervia	Italy
Mikel Koliqi (1902–1997)	Priest from the Archdiocese of Shkodër–Pult	Albania
Yves Congar (1904–1995)	Theologian	France
Aloys Grillmeier (1910–1998)	Theologian	Germany

== 21 February 1998 ==
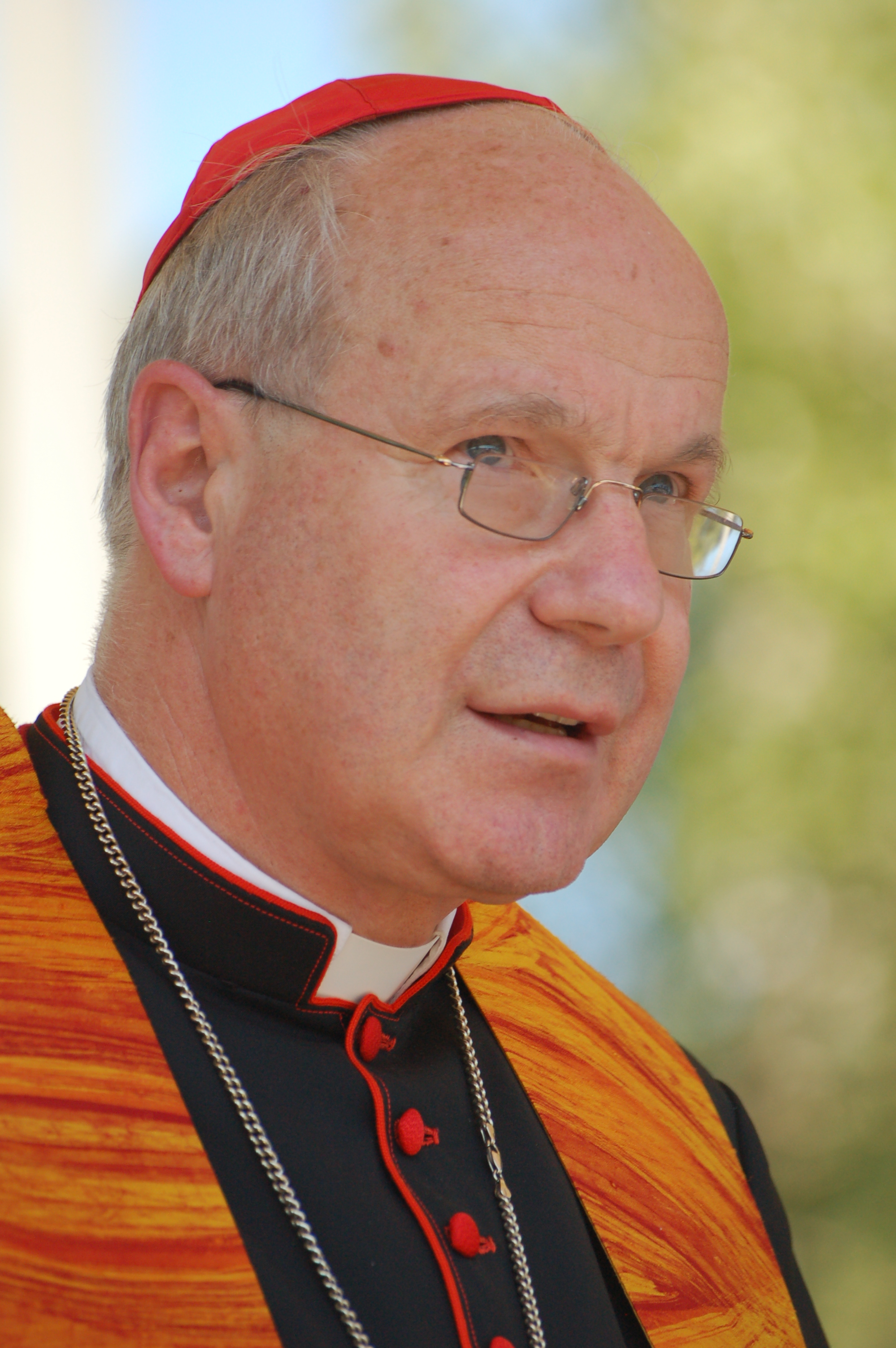
Christoph Schönborn (born 1945), made a cardinal on 21 February 1998.

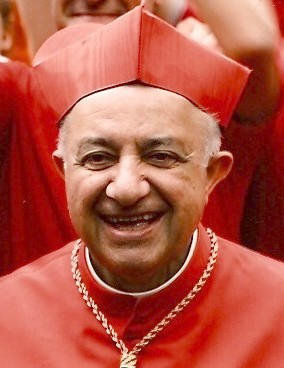
Dionigi Tettamanzi (1927–2017), made a cardinal on 21 February 1998.

John Paul announced on 18 January 1998 that he would create 22 new cardinals, but withheld the names of two of them. He had also planned to include Josip Uhač, a Vatican diplomat and curial official who died that morning. The consistory was scheduled for 21 February. Excluding the two not named, this brought the membership of the College of Cardinals to 165, of whom 122 were eligible to vote in a conclave. (Note: When the consistory was announced, it would have brought the number of cardinal electors to 123, but Eduardo Francisco Pironio died on 5 February 1998 at the age of 77.)

Name	Title when named cardinal	Country
Jorge Medina Estévez (1926–2021)	Pro-Prefect of Congregation for Divine Worship and the Discipline of the Sacraments	Chile
Alberto Bovone (1922–1998)	Pro-Prefect of Congregation for the Causes of Saints	Italy
Darío Castrillón Hoyos (1929–2018)	Pro-Prefect of Congregation for Clergy	Colombia
Lorenzo Antonetti (1922–2013)	Pro-President of Administration of the Patrimony of the Apostolic See	Italy
James Stafford (b. 1932)	President of Pontifical Council for the Laity	United States
Salvatore De Giorgi (b. 1930)	Archbishop of Palermo	Italy
Serafim Fernandes de Araújo (1924–2019)	Archbishop of Belo Horizonte	Brazil
Antonio María Rouco Varela (b. 1936)	Archbishop of Madrid	Spain
Aloysius Ambrozic (1930–2011)	Archbishop of Toronto	Canada
Jean Marie Balland (1934–1998)	Archbishop of Lyon	France
Dionigi Tettamanzi (1934–2017)	Archbishop of Genoa	Italy
Polycarp Pengo (1944–2026)	Archbishop of Dar-es-Salaam	Tanzania
Christoph Schönborn (b. 1945)	Archbishop of Vienna	Austria
Norberto Rivera Carrera (b. 1942)	Archbishop of Mexico	Mexico
Francis George (1937–2015)	Archbishop of Chicago	United States
Paul Shan Kuo-Hsi (1924–2012)	Bishop of Kaohsiung	Taiwan
Adam Kozłowiecki (1911–2007)	Archbishop Emeritus of Lusaka	Poland
Giovanni Cheli (1918–2013)	President of Pontifical Council for the Pastoral Care of Migrants and Itinerant People	Italy
Francesco Colasuonno (1925–2003)	Apostolic Nuncio to Italy and Apostolic Nuncio to San Marino	Italy
Dino Monduzzi (1922–2006)	Prefect of Prefecture of the Papal Household	Italy

=== Cardinal in pectore ===
Name	Title when named cardinal	Country	Revealed as Cardinal
Marian Jaworski (1926–2020)	Archbishop of Lviv	Ukraine	29 January 2001
Jānis Pujats (b. 1930)	Archbishop of Riga	Latvia	29 January 2001

== 21 February 2001 ==
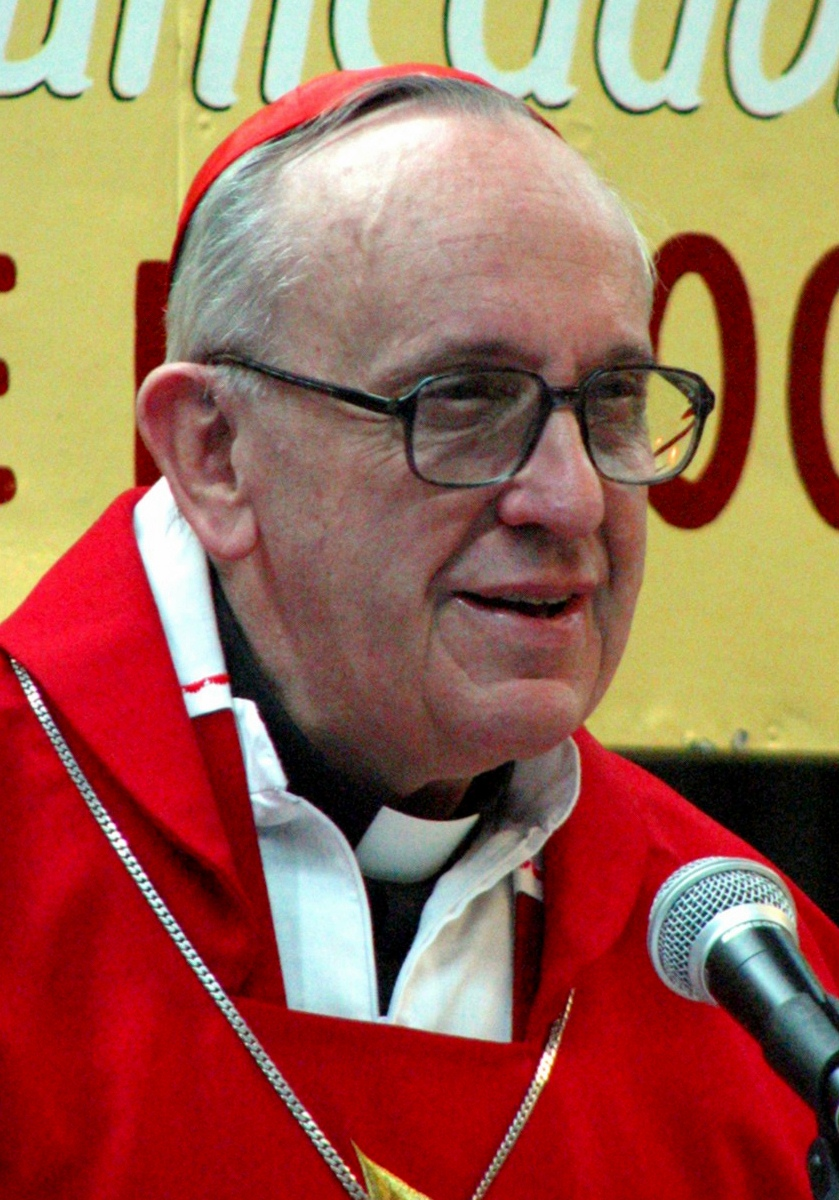
Jorge Bergoglio (1936–2025), made a cardinal on 21 February 2001 and elected Pope Francis on 13 March 2013

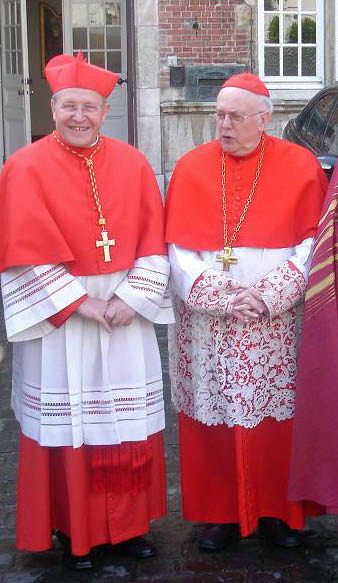
Cardinals Walter Kasper (born 1933) and Godfried Danneels (1933–2019)

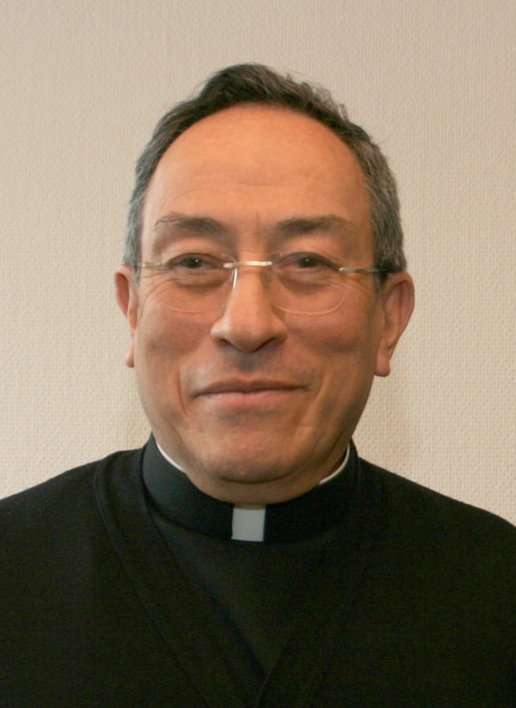
Óscar Andrés Rodríguez Maradiaga (born 1942), made a cardinal on 21 February 2001

On 21 January 2001, Pope John Paul II announced plans to raise 37 prelates to the rank on cardinal at a consistory in February. He also said that at the consistory he would announce the names of two cardinals he named in pectore in 1998. He followed that by announcing the names of five more on 28 January and revealed the two made cardinals secretly in 1998, Marian Jaworski and Janis Pujats. The 44 cardinals created at this consistory was the largest ever created at a consistory. It increased the number of cardinals eligible to vote in a papal election to 135, despite the maximum of 120 set by Pope Paul VI in 1975 and reiterated by John Paul II in 1996; he said in each of his announcements that he was setting aside this limit. The total number of cardinals reached 183 after the consistory. (Note: 165 cardinals at 1998 consistory minus 26 cardinals who died before the 2001 consistory (Quarracino, Balland, Ribeiro, Bovone, Casaroli, Carberry, Ballestrero, Grillmeier, Oviedo Cavada, Silva Henríquez, Hume, Dezza, Kung Pin-mei, Padiyara, Echeverría Ruiz, O'Connor, Sladkevičius, Zoungrana, Vargas Alzamora, Fagiolo, Gouyon, Righi-Lambertini, Palazzini, Lubachivsky, Casoria, Lebrún Moratinos) plus 42 newly-appointed cardinals plus two revealed cardinals in pectore (Jaworski and Pujats).)

Among the Cardinals named in this consistory is Jorge Mario Bergoglio, the future Pope Francis.

Name	Title when named cardinal	Country
Giovanni Battista Re (b. 1934)	Prefect of Congregation for Bishops	Italy
Nguyen Van Thuan (1928–2002)	President of Pontifical Council for Justice and Peace	Vietnam
Agostino Cacciavillan (1926–2022)	President of Administration of the Patrimony of the Apostolic See	Italy
Sergio Sebastiani (1931–2024)	President of Prefecture for the Economic Affairs of the Holy See	Italy
Zenon Grocholewski (1939–2020)	Prefect of Congregation for Catholic Education (for Educational Institutions)	Poland
José Saraiva Martins (b. 1932)	Prefect of Congregation for the Causes of Saints	Portugal
Crescenzio Sepe (b. 1943)	President of Peregrinatio ad Petri Sedem	Italy
Jorge María Mejía (1923–2014)	Librarian of the Vatican Apostolic Library & Archivist of the Vatican Secret Archives	Argentina
Ignatius Moses I Daoud (1930–2012)	Prefect of Congregation for the Oriental Churches	Syria
Mario Francesco Pompedda (1929–2006)	Prefect of Supreme Tribunal of the Apostolic Signatura	Italy
Walter Kasper (b. 1933)	Secretary of Pontifical Council for Promoting Christian Unity	Germany
Johannes Joachim Degenhardt (1926–2002)	Archbishop of Paderborn	Germany
Antonio José González Zumárraga (1925–2008)	Archbishop of Quito	Ecuador
Ivan Dias (1936–2017)	Archbishop of Bombay	India
Geraldo Majella Agnelo (1933–2023)	Archbishop of São Salvador da Bahia	Brazil
Pedro Rubiano Sáenz (1932–2024)	Archbishop of Bogota	Colombia
Theodore Edgar McCarrick (1930–2025) (Note: Resigned from the College of Cardinals in 2018. Laicized in 2019.)	Archbishop of Washington	United States
Desmond Connell (1926–2017)	Archbishop of Dublin	Ireland
Audrys Bačkis (b. 1937)	Archbishop of Vilnius	Lithuania
Francisco Javier Errázuriz Ossa (b. 1933)	Archbishop of Santiago	Chile
Julio Terrazas Sandoval (1936–2015)	Archbishop of Santa Cruz de la Sierra	Bolivia
Wilfrid Napier (b. 1941)	Archbishop of Durban	South Africa
Óscar Andrés Rodríguez Maradiaga (b. 1942)	Archbishop of Tegucigalpa	Honduras
Bernard Agré (1926–2014)	Archbishop of Abidjan	Ivory Coast
Louis-Marie Billé (1938–2002)	Archbishop of Lyon	France
Ignacio Velasco (1929–2003)	Archbishop of Caracas	Venezuela
Juan Luis Cipriani Thorne (b. 1943)	Archbishop of Lima	Peru
Francisco Álvarez Martínez (1925–2022)	Archbishop of Toledo	Spain
Cláudio Hummes (1934–2022)	Archbishop of São Paulo	Brazil
Varkey Vithayathil (1927–2011)	Archbishop of Ernakulam	India
Jorge Bergoglio (1936–2025) (Note: elected as Pope Francis (2013–2025))	Archbishop of Buenos Aires	Argentina
José Policarpo (1936–2014)	Patriarch of Lisbon	Portugal
Severino Poletto (1933–2022)	Archbishop of Turin	Italy
Cormac Murphy-O'Connor (1932–2017)	Archbishop of Westminster	United Kingdom
Edward Egan (1932–2015)	Archbishop of New York	United States
Lubomyr Husar (1933–2017)	Major-Archbishop of Lviv-Galicia	Ukraine
Karl Lehmann (1936–2018)	Bishop of Mainz	Germany
Stéphanos II Ghattas (1920–2009)	Patriarch of Alexandria of the Copts	Egypt
Jean Marcel Honoré (1920–2013)	Archbishop Emeritus of Tours	France
Roberto Tucci (1921–2015)	President Emeritus of Vatican Radio	Italy
Leo Scheffczyk (1920–2005)	Theologian	Germany
Avery Dulles (1918–2008)	Theologian	United States

== 21 October 2003 ==
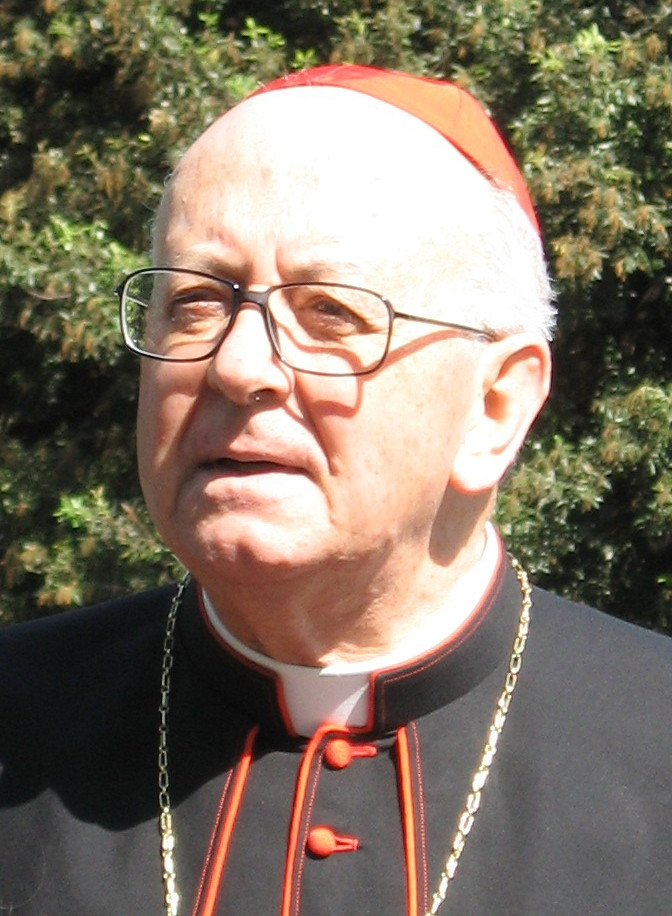
Attilio Nicora (1937–2017), made a cardinal on 21 October 2003

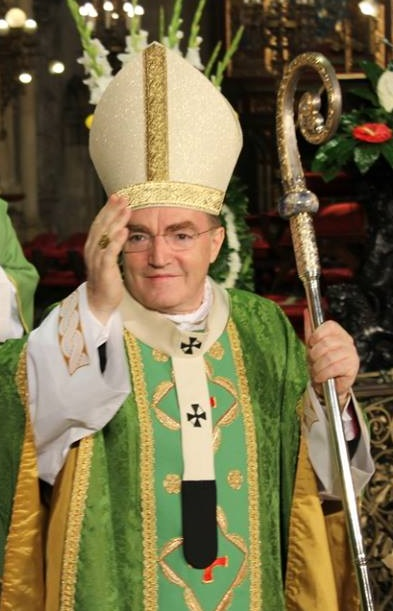
Josip Bozanić (born 1949), made a cardinal on 21 October 2003

Pope John Paul II announced on 28 September 2003 that he would create 31 new cardinals in an October consistory, but withheld the name of one of them, apparently a resident of a country where Catholicism was the object of government persecution. (Note: John Paul never revealed this name.) Twenty-six of those publicly named were young enough to vote in a papal conclave, and seven of those were members of the Roman Curia. This consistory increased the number of cardinal electors from 109 to 135. The total number of cardinals reached 194 after the consistory. (Note: 183 cardinals at 2001 consistory minus 19 cardinals who died before the 2003 consistory (Eyt, Winning, Oddi, Sensi, Bertoli, Kuharić, Billé, Todea, Degenhardt, Moreira Neves, Nguyễn Văn Thuận, Wu Cheng-chung, Groër, Carter, Sabattani, Colasuonno, Velasco García, Ursi, Otunga) plus 30 newly-appointed cardinals.) Because the withheld name was never published, that cardinal's appointment expired when the Pope died.

Name	Title when named cardinal	Country
Jean-Louis Tauran (1943–2018)	Secretary for Relations with States of Secretariat of State	France
Renato Martino (1932–2024)	President of Pontifical Council for Justice and Peace	Italy
Francesco Marchisano (1929–2014)	Vicar General for the Vatican City State of Rome, President of Fabric of Saint Peter and Archpriest of Papal Basilica of Saint Peter	Italy
Julián Herranz Casado (b. 1930)	President of Pontifical Council for Legislative Text	Spain
Javier Lozano Barragán (1933–2022)	President of Pontifical Council for Pastoral Assistance to Health Care Workers	Mexico
Stephen Fumio Hamao (1930–2007)	President of Pontifical Council for the Pastoral Care of Migrants and Itinerant People	Japan
Attilio Nicora (1937–2017)	President of Administration of the Patrimony of the Apostolic See	Italy
Angelo Scola (b. 1941)	Patriarch of Venice	Italy
Anthony Olubunmi Okogie (b. 1936)	Archbishop of Lagos	Nigeria
Bernard Panafieu (1931–2017)	Archbishop of Marseille	France
Gabriel Zubeir Wako (b. 1941)	Archbishop of Khartoum	Sudan
Carlos Amigo Vallejo (1934–2022)	Archbishop of Sevilla	Spain
Justin Francis Rigali (b. 1935)	Archbishop of Philadelphia	United States
Keith Michael Patrick O'Brien (1938–2018)	Archbishop of Saint Andrews and Edinburgh	United Kingdom
Eusébio Scheid (1932–2021)	Archbishop of São Sebastião do Rio de Janeiro	Brazil
Ennio Antonelli (b. 1936)	Archbishop of Firenze	Italy
Tarcisio Bertone (b. 1934)	Archbishop of Genoa	Italy
Peter Turkson (b. 1948)	Archbishop of Cape Coast	Ghana
Telesphore Toppo (1939–2023)	Archbishop of Ranchi	India
George Pell (1941–2023)	Archbishop of Sydney	Australia
Josip Bozanić (b. 1949)	Archbishop of Zagreb	Croatia
Phạm Minh Mẫn (1934–2026)	Archbishop of Ho Chi Minh City	Vietnam
Rodolfo Quezada Toruño (1932–2012)	Archbishop of Guatemala	Guatemala
Philippe Barbarin (b. 1950)	Archbishop of Lyon	France
Péter Erdő (b. 1952)	Archbishop of Esztergom–Budapest	Hungary
Marc Ouellet (b. 1944)	Archbishop of Quebec	Canada
Georges Cottier (1922–2016)	Theologian of Prefecture of the Papal Household	Switzerland
Gustaaf Joos (1923–2004)	Priest from the Diocese of Gent	Belgium
Tomáš Špidlík (1919–2010)	Theologian	Czech Republic
Stanisław Nagy (1921–2013)	Theologian	Poland

== Demographic adjustment ==
In 2004, the birth year of Cardinal Henryk Gulbinowicz, long reported as 1928, was corrected to 1923. The adjustment meant he was past his 80th birthday and no longer counted as a cardinal elector. In 1942, as a young man, Gulbinowicz had falsified his birth records to escape being sent to a Nazi labor camp. The correct birth date was reported in the Italian press as early as March 2004 and printed in the Pontifical Yearbook presented to John Paul on 31 January 2005.

== See also ==
- Cardinals created by Paul VI (previous to John Paul I)
- Cardinals created by Benedict XVI (successor)
- List of current cardinals
