= Cardinals created by Benedict XVI =

Catholic appointments from 2006 to 2012

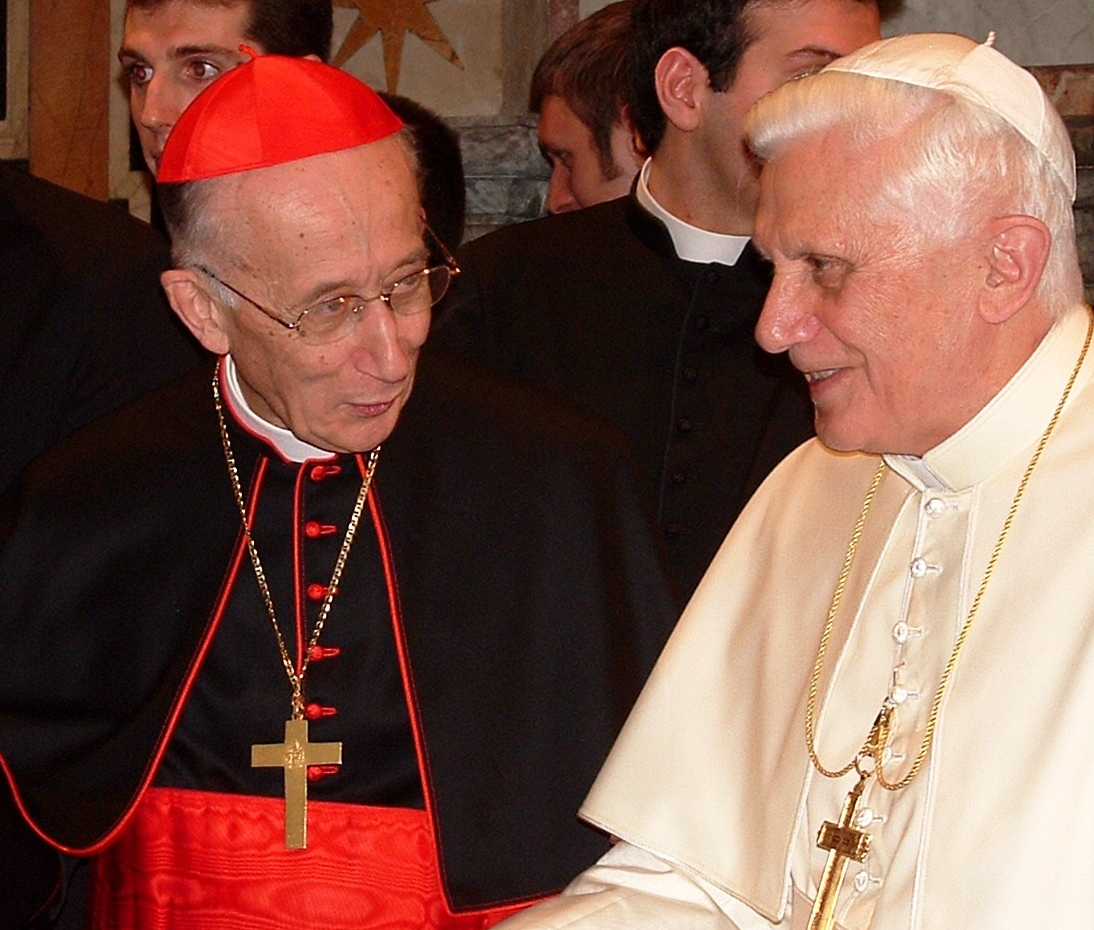
Pope Benedict XVI with Cardinal Camillo Ruini, 2006

Pope Benedict XVI (r. 2005–2013) created 90 cardinals in five consistories. With three of those consistories, he respected the limit on the number of cardinal electors set at 120 in 1973, though sometimes exceeded by his predecessors. (Note: Pope Paul VI set the maximum at 120 in 1973, after having raised the number to 134 in 1969. Pope John Paul II confirmed the 120 limit in 1996, though he twice raised the number of cardinal electors to 135, in February 2001 and again in October 2003.) He exceeded that limit at the other two consistories, reaching as high as 125 in 2012.

With the consistory of February 2012, a majority of the cardinal electors had been named cardinals by Benedict (63 of 125). After his last consistory in November 2012, he had appointed 67 of the 120 electors.

Given that neither the 2013 nor the 2025 conclave chose a cardinal created by Benedict as pope (Note: Pope Francis, elected in 2013, was a cardinal created by Pope John Paul II in 2001. On the other hand, Pope Leo XIV, elected in 2025, was a cardinal created by Pope Francis in 2023.), it is unlikely that any of the cardinals he created will serve as pope. (Note: As of April 2026, there are only 17 living cardinal-electors created by Benedict XVI. Among them, only three are less than 70 years old. The likely explanation is that since Pope Leo XIV, the current Pope, is 70 years old, given that the three previous Popes ended their pontificate at their mid-80s, these cardinals may be above 80 at the time of the next conclave, diminishing the possibility of becoming a choice for the papacy, as most cardinal-electors pick a name from among themselves.) This has not happened since Pius VIII (r. 1829–1830). (Note: Successive Popes from Gregory XVI to Francis, except Pope John Paul I have created cardinals, with at least one of them becoming Pope. Among the cardinals created by Pope Paul VI, three became Pope (Pope John Paul I, Pope John Paul II, Pope Benedict XVI). On the other hand, John Paul I, who reigned only 33 days as Pope before his death, did not call for a consistory.)

== Cardinal electors ==
Benedict's first, second and fifth (last) consistories brought the number of cardinal electors to 120.

The 2010 consistory produced 121 electors, until Cardinal Bernard Panafieu turned 80 two months later on 26 January 2011. After the consistory of February 2012, there were 125 electors, and the count returned to 120 on 26 July after the 80th birthdays of Cardinals Rodolfo Quezada Toruño, Edward Michael Egan, Miloslav Vlk, Henri Schwery, and James Francis Stafford.

== 24 March 2006 ==
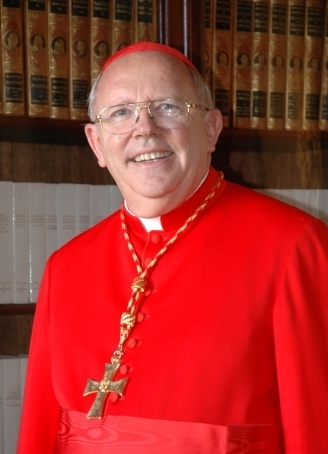
Jean-Pierre Ricard (b. 1944), made a cardinal on 24 March 2006

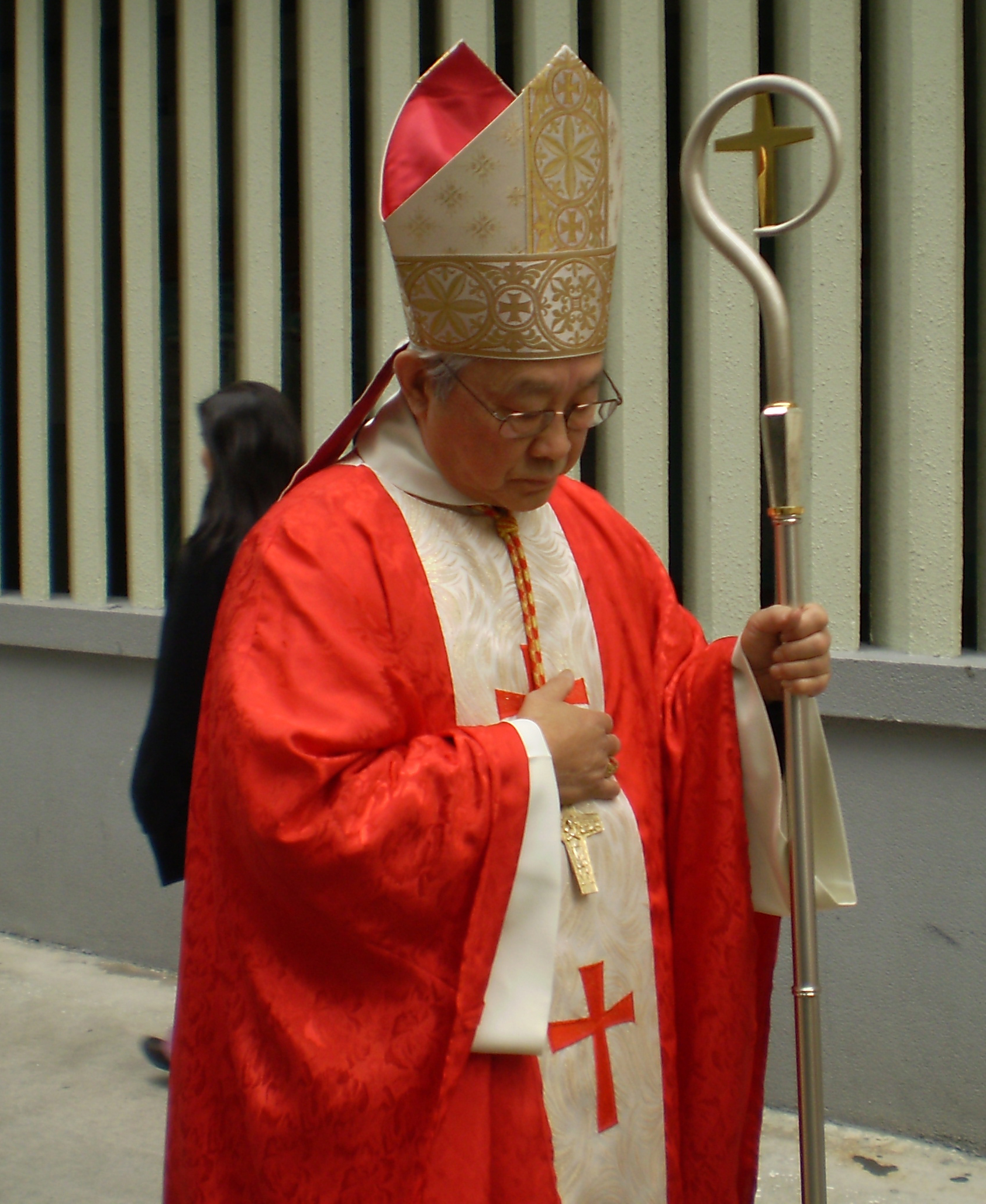
Joseph Zen Ze-kiun (b. 1932), made a cardinal on 24 March 2006

Pope Benedict XVI created new cardinals for the first time on 24 March 2006. He had announced the names of fifteen new cardinals-designate from eleven countries on 22 February 2006. Three belonged to the Roman Curia, nine headed a diocese, and two were bishops emeritus. One, Albert Vanhoye, was a Jesuit priest and theologian, not a bishop. Twelve of the fifteen were under 80 years old and eligible to vote in a papal conclave. With these new cardinals, Benedict limited the number of cardinal electors to 120, the maximum set by statute since 1973 and which John Paul II had at times exceeded. The appointments brought the total number of cardinals to 193. (Note: 183 cardinals at 2005 conclave minus 1 cardinal elected pope (Ratzinger) minus 4 cardinals who died before the 2006 consistory (Sin, Caprio, Scheffczyk, Taofinuʻu) plus 15 newly-appointed cardinals.)

Name	Title when named cardinal	Country
William Joseph Levada (1936–2019)	Prefect of the Congregation for the Doctrine of the Faith	United States
Franc Rode C.M. (b. 1934)	Prefect of the Congregation for Institutes of Consecrated Life and Societies of Apostolic Life	Slovenia
Agostino Vallini (b. 1940)	Prefect of the Apostolic Signatura	Italy
Jorge Liberato Urosa Savino (1942–2021)	Archbishop of Caracas	Venezuela
Gaudencio Rosales (b. 1932)	Archbishop of Manila	Philippines
Jean-Pierre Ricard (b. 1944)	Archbishop of Bordeaux	France
Antonio Cañizares Llovera (b. 1945)	Archbishop of Toledo	Spain
Nicolas Cheong Jin-suk (1931–2021)	Archbishop of Seoul	South Korea
Seán Patrick O'Malley O.F.M. Cap. (b. 1944)	Archbishop of Boston	United States
Stanisław Dziwisz (b. 1939)	Archbishop of Kraków	Poland
Carlo Caffarra (1938–2017)	Archbishop of Bologna	Italy
Joseph Zen Ze-kiun S.D.B. (b. 1932)	Bishop of Hong Kong	Hong Kong
Andrea Cordero Lanza di Montezemolo (1925–2017)	Archpriest of the Basilica of Saint Paul Outside the Walls	Italy
Peter Poreku Dery (1918–2008)	Archbishop Emeritus of Tamale	Ghana
Albert Vanhoye S.J. (1923–2021)	Secretary Emeritus of the Pontifical Biblical Commission	France

== 24 November 2007 ==
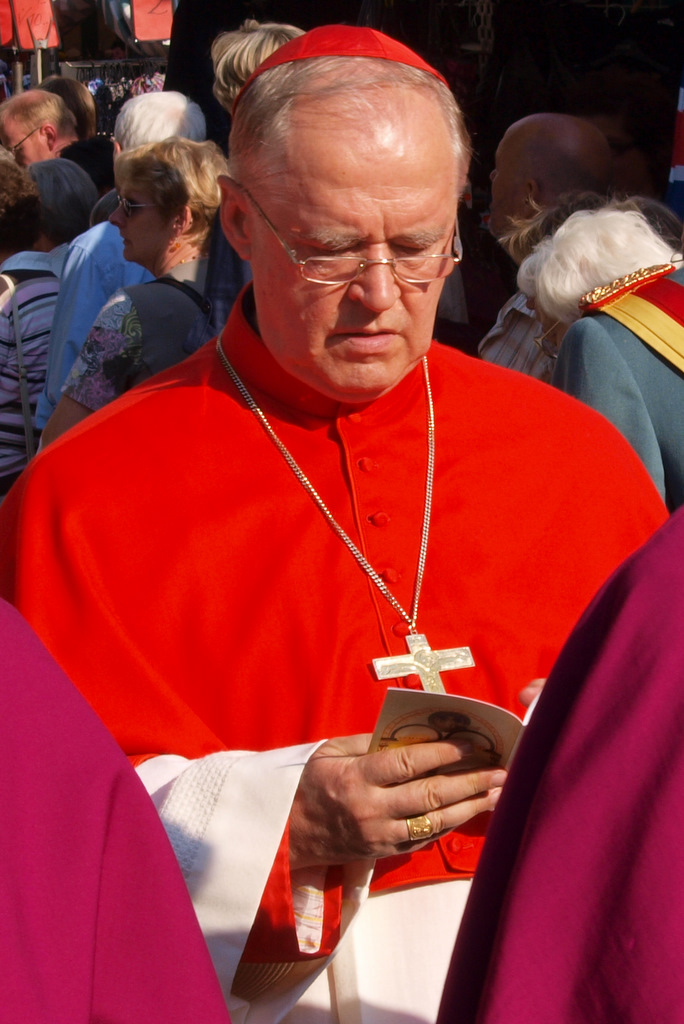
Paul Josef Cordes (1934–2024), made a cardinal on 24 November 2007

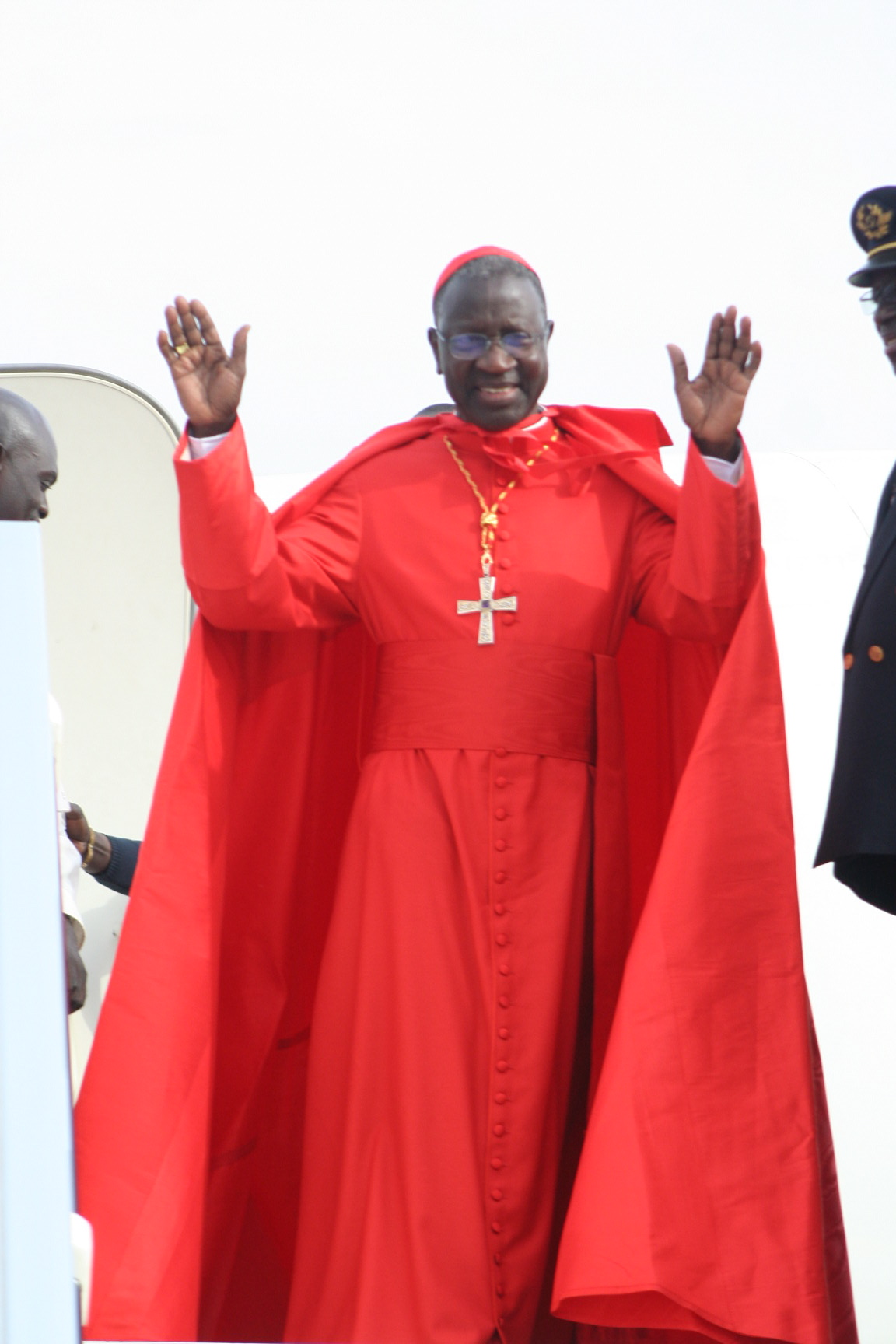
Théodore-Adrien Sarr (b. 1936), made a cardinal on 24 November 2007

Pope Benedict announced the appointment of 23 new cardinals on 17 October 2007, scheduling a consistory for 24 November. Eighteen of the 23 cardinals were under 80. After the consistory, the College of Cardinals had 201 members, of whom 120 were eligible to vote in a papal election. (Note: At the time of consistory announcement (17 October 2007), there were 121 cardinal electors and 202 cardinals in total including those to be appointed. However, the death of cardinal Stephen Fumio Hamao on 8 November 2007 reduced those numbers to 120 and 201 respectively before the consistory.)

He announced that he had intended to make Bishop Ignacy Jeż of Koszalin-Kołobrzeg, Poland, who died on 16 October, a cardinal as well.

Name	Title when named cardinal	Country
Leonardo Sandri (b. 1943)	Prefect of the Congregation for the Oriental Churches	Argentina
John Patrick Foley (1935–2011)	Pro-Grand Master of the Equestrian Order of the Holy Sepulchre of Jerusalem	United States
Giovanni Lajolo (b. 1935)	President of the Governorate of Vatican City	Italy
Paul Josef Cordes (1934–2024)	President of the Pontifical Council 'Cor Unum'	Germany
Angelo Comastri (b. 1943)	Vicar General for Vatican City	Italy
Stanisław Ryłko (b. 1945)	President of the Pontifical Council for the Laity	Poland
Raffaele Farina S.D.B. (b. 1933)	Librarian of the Vatican Apostolic Library & Archivist of the Vatican Secret Archives	Italy
Agustín García-Gasco Vicente (1931–2011)	Archbishop of Valencia	Spain
Seán Baptist Brady (b. 1939)	Archbishop of Armagh	Ireland
Lluís Martínez Sistach (b. 1937)	Archbishop of Barcelona	Spain
André Vingt-Trois (1942–2025)	Archbishop of Paris	France
Angelo Bagnasco (b. 1943)	Archbishop of Genoa	Italy
Théodore-Adrien Sarr (b. 1936)	Archbishop of Dakar	Senegal
Oswald Gracias (b. 1944)	Archbishop of Bombay	India
Francisco Robles Ortega (b. 1949)	Archbishop of Monterrey	Mexico
Daniel Nicholas DiNardo (b. 1949)	Archbishop of Galveston–Houston	United States
Odilo Scherer (b. 1949)	Archbishop of São Paulo	Brazil
John Njue (b. 1946)	Archbishop of Nairobi	Kenya
Emmanuel III Delly (1927–2014)	Patriarch of Babylon of the Chaldeans	Iraq
Giovanni Coppa (1925–2016)	Assessor for General Affairs Emeritus of the Secretariat of State	Italy
Estanislao Esteban Karlic (1926–2025)	Archbishop Emeritus of Paraná	Argentina
Urbano Navarrete Cortés S.J. (1920–2010)	Rector Magnificus Emeritus of the Pontifical Gregorian University	Spain
Umberto Betti O.F.M. (1922–2009)	Rector Magnificus Emeritus of the Pontifical Lateran University	Italy

== 20 November 2010 ==
Benedict announced the names of 24 new cardinals on 20 October 2010, scheduling a consistory for 20 November. Fifteen were Europeans, including ten Italians, seven of whom were senior members of the Roman Curia. Twenty were under 80 years old. This consistory brought the number of cardinals to 203, of whom 121 were eligible to vote in a conclave.

Name	Title when named cardinal	Country
Angelo Amato (1938–2024)	Prefect of the Congregation for the Causes of Saints	Italy
Antonios Naguib (1935–2022)	Patriarch of Alexandria of the Copts	Egypt
Robert Sarah (b. 1945)	President of the Pontifical Council 'Cor Unum'	Guinea
Francesco Monterisi (b. 1934)	Archpriest of the Basilica of Saint Paul Outside the Walls	Italy
Fortunato Baldelli (1935–2012)	Major Penitentiary of the Apostolic Penitentiary	Italy
Raymond Leo Burke (b. 1948)	Prefect of the Apostolic Signatura	United States
Kurt Koch (b. 1950)	President of the Pontifical Council for Promoting Christian Unity	Switzerland
Paolo Sardi (1934–2019)	Pro-Patron of the Sovereign Military Order of Malta	Italy
Mauro Piacenza (b. 1944)	Prefect of the Congregation for the Clergy	Italy
Velasio de Paolis (1935–2017)	President of the Prefecture of the Economic Affairs of the Holy See	Italy
Gianfranco Ravasi (b. 1942)	President of the Pontifical Council for Culture	Italy
Medardo Joseph Mazombwe (1931–2013)	Archbishop Emeritus of Lusaka	Zambia
Raúl Eduardo Vela Chiriboga (1934–2020)	Archbishop Emeritus of Quito	Ecuador
Laurent Monsengwo Pasinya (1939–2021)	Archbishop of Kinshasa	Democratic Republic of the Congo
Paolo Romeo (1938–2026)	Archbishop of Palermo	Italy
Donald William Wuerl (b. 1940)	Archbishop of Washington	United States
Raymundo Damasceno Assis (b. 1937)	Archbishop of Aparecida	Brazil
Kazimierz Nycz (b. 1950)	Archbishop of Warsaw	Poland
Malcolm Ranjith (b. 1947)	Archbishop of Colombo	Sri Lanka
Reinhard Marx (b. 1953)	Archbishop of Munich and Freising	Germany
José Manuel Estepa Llaurens (1926–2019)	Military Ordinary Emeritus of Spain	Spain
Elio Sgreccia (1928–2019)	President Emeritus of the Pontifical Academy for Life	Italy
Walter Brandmüller (b. 1929)	President Emeritus of the Pontifical Committee for Historical Sciences	Germany
Domenico Bartolucci (1917–2013)	Director Master Emeritus of the Pontifical Musical Chorus	Italy

== 18 February 2012 ==
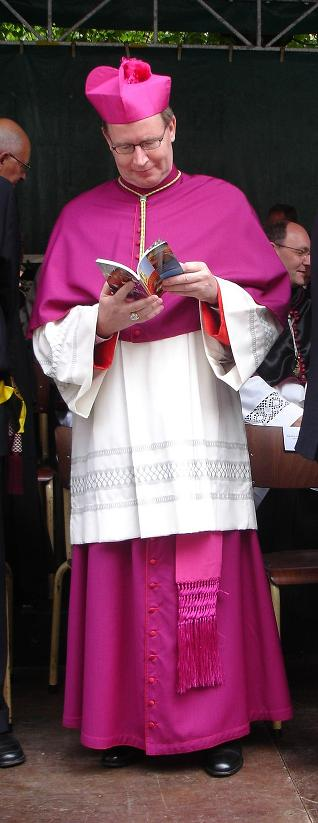
Wim Eijk (b. 1953), made a cardinal on 18 February 2012

Benedict announced the names of 22 new cardinals on 6 January 2012, with a consistory set for 18 February. Eighteen were young enough to be cardinal electors. Sixteen were Europeans, including seven Italians. Ten held Vatican offices. With these additions, the number of cardinal electors increased from 107 to 125, a majority of 63 of them named by Benedict. Though the number of cardinal electors exceeded the limit of 120, nine of them were due to turn eighty before the end of the year. Previously, only Pope John Paul II's consistories in 2001 and 2003 had produced a larger number of electors, 135. The consistory of February 2012 brought the total number of cardinals to 213. (Note: 203 cardinals at 2010 consistory minus 12 cardinals who died before the consistory of February 2012 (Navarrete Cortés, Giordano, Vithayathil, Saldarini, García-Gasco Vicente, Sterzinsky, Świątek, Noè, Ambrozic, Deskur, Foley, Bevilacqua) plus 22 newly-appointed cardinals.)

Name	Title when named Cardinal	Country
Fernando Filoni (b. 1946)	Prefect of the Congregation for the Evangelization of Peoples	Italy
Manuel Monteiro de Castro (b. 1938)	Major Penitentiary of the Apostolic Penitentiary	Portugal
Santos Abril y Castelló (b. 1936)	Archpriest of the Basilica of Santa Maria Maggiore	Spain
Antonio Maria Vegliò (b. 1938)	President of the Pontifical Council for the Pastoral Care of Migrants and Itinerant People	Italy
Giuseppe Bertello (b. 1942)	President of the Governorate of Vatican City	Italy
Francesco Coccopalmerio (b. 1938)	President of the Pontifical Council for Legislative Texts	Italy
João Braz de Aviz (b. 1947)	Prefect of the Congregation for Institutes of Consecrated Life and Societies of Apostolic Life	Brazil
Edwin Frederick O'Brien (b. 1939)	Pro-Grand Master of the Equestrian Order of the Holy Sepulchre of Jerusalem	United States
Domenico Calcagno (b. 1943)	President of the Administration of the Patrimony of the Apostolic See	Italy
Giuseppe Versaldi (b. 1943)	President of the Prefecture of Economic Affairs of the Holy See	Italy
George Alencherry (b. 1945)	Major Archbishop of Ernakulam–Angamaly	India
Thomas Christopher Collins (b. 1947)	Archbishop of Toronto	Canada
Dominik Duka O.P. (1943–2025)	Archbishop of Prague	Czech Republic
Wim Jacobus Eijk (b. 1953)	Archbishop of Utrecht	Netherlands
Giuseppe Betori (b. 1947)	Archbishop of Florence	Italy
Timothy Michael Dolan (b. 1950)	Archbishop of New York	United States
Rainer Woelki (b. 1956)	Archbishop of Berlin	Germany
John Tong Hon (b. 1939)	Bishop of Hong Kong	Hong Kong
Lucian Mureșan (1931–2025)	Major Archbishop of Făgăraș and Alba Iulia	Romania
Julien Ries (1920–2013)	Priest from the Diocese of Namur	Belgium
Prosper Grech O.S.A. (1925–2019)	Consultor for the Congregation for the Doctrine of the Faith	Malta
Karl Josef Becker S.J. (1928–2015)	Consultor for the Congregation for the Doctrine of the Faith	Germany

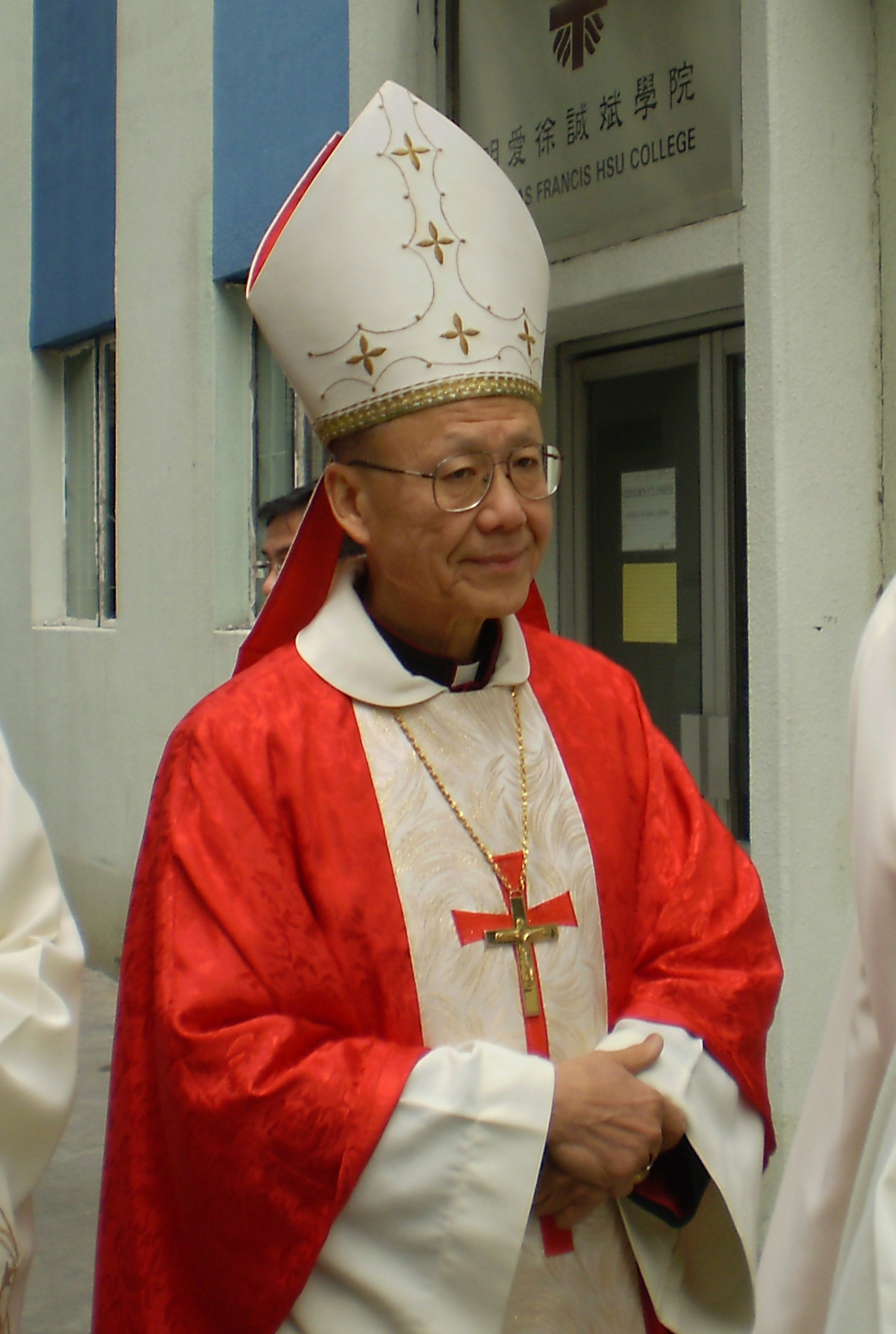
John Tong Hon (b. 1939), made a cardinal on 18 February 2012

== 24 November 2012 ==
On 24 October 2012, during a meeting of the Synod of Bishops, Benedict announced he would create six cardinals at a consistory on 24 November. At the time, there were 116 cardinal electors, with two set to turn 80 in the next month. The six new cardinals would bring that number to 120, 67 of whom were made cardinals by Benedict. The November consistory brought the total number of cardinals to 211. (Note: 213 cardinals at the previous consistory minus 8 cardinals who died before the consistory of November 2012 (Sánchez, Daoud, Aponte Martinez, Quezada Toruño, Sales, Shan Kuo-hsi, Martini, Baldelli) plus 6 newly-appointed cardinals.) Those named contrasted with those of the previous consistory, who had been criticized as "too Italian and too curial". Benedict said that "this little consistory" was meant to "complete" the earlier one "with a sign of the universality of the Church".

Name	Title when named cardinal	Country
James Michael Harvey (b. 1949)	Prefect of the Prefecture of the Papal Household	United States
Bechara Boutros al-Rahi O.M.M. (b. 1940)	Patriarch of Antioch of the Maronites	Lebanon
Baselios Cleemis Thottunkal (b. 1959)	Major Archbishop of Trivandrum	India
John Olorunfemi Onaiyekan (b. 1944)	Archbishop of Abuja	Nigeria
Rubén Salazar Gómez (b. 1942)	Archbishop of Bogotá	Colombia
Luis Antonio Tagle (b. 1957)	Archbishop of Manila	Philippines

== See also ==
- Cardinals created by John Paul II (previous)
- Cardinals created by Francis (successor)
- List of current cardinals
