= October 1978 conclave =

Election of Catholic Pope John Paul II

Papal conclave October 1978

Dates and location
- 14–16 October 1978; Sistine Chapel, Apostolic Palace, Vatican City

Key officials
- Dean: Carlo Confalonieri
- Sub-dean: Paolo Marella
- Camerlengo: Jean-Marie Villot
- Protopriest: Carlos Motta
- Protodeacon: Pericle Felici
- Secretary: Ernesto Civardi

Election
- Electors: 111 (list)
- Candidates: See papabili
- Ballots: 8

Elected pope
- Karol Wojtyła; Name taken: John Paul II

A conclave was held from 14 to 16 October 1978 to elect a new pope to succeed John Paul I, who had died on 28 September 1978, just 33 days after his election. All 111 eligible cardinal electors attended. On the eighth ballot, the conclave elected Cardinal Karol Wojtyła, the archbishop of Kraków. After accepting his election, he took the name John Paul II. The second conclave in the year, this was the latest conclave to include all eligible cardinal electors.

== Papabili ==
Ten days after the funeral of Pope John Paul I, on 14 October, the doors of the Sistine Chapel were sealed and the conclave commenced. It was divided between two particularly strong candidates for the papacy: Cardinal Giuseppe Siri, the conservative archbishop of Genoa, and Cardinal Giovanni Benelli, the liberal archbishop of Florence and a close associate of John Paul I.

== Proceedings ==
Inside the conclave were three non-cardinals. One was Donald Wuerl, secretary to the frail cardinal John Wright, who was allowed inside the Sistine Chapel to assist him.

This conclave had the same number of cardinals as the first conclave of 1978. Only Albino Luciani himself (who became Pope John Paul I) was absent from this conclave after having attended the first conclave of 1978, and this was offset numerically by the presence of Cardinal Wright at this conclave.

Supporters of Benelli were confident that he would be elected. In early ballots, Benelli came within nine votes. However, the scale of opposition to both papabili meant that neither was likely to receive the two-thirds majority for election. Among the Italian contingent, Cardinal Giovanni Colombo, the archbishop of Milan, was the only viable compromise candidate, but when he started to receive votes, he announced that he would decline the papacy if elected. Cardinal Franz König, the influential and widely respected archbishop of Vienna, individually suggested to his fellow electors a compromise candidate: the Polish cardinal Karol Wojtyła, whom König knew and by whom he was highly impressed.

Also among those cardinals who rallied behind Wojtyła were supporters of Siri, Stefan Wyszyński, most of the American cardinals (led by John Krol), and other moderate cardinals. Wojtyła ultimately defeated Benelli (who was supposedly the candidate Wojtyła himself had voted for) on the eighth ballot on the third day with, according to the Italian press, 99 votes from the 111 participating electors. He accepted his election with these words: "With obedience in faith to Christ, my Lord, and with trust in the Mother of Christ and the Church, in spite of great difficulties, I accept." The pope, in tribute to his immediate predecessor, took the name John Paul II. He became the first non-Italian pope since Adrian VI, who reigned from 1522 to 1523.

At 18:19 CET (17:19 UTC), the white smoke rose from the chimney of the Sistine Chapel, announcing to the public that a new pope had been elected. The senior cardinal deacon, Pericle Felici, after quickly checking the correct pronunciation of the new pope's Polish name with Cardinal Stefan Wyszyński, gave the traditional Latin announcement of Wojtyła's election from the balcony of St. Peter's Basilica.

John Paul II appeared on the balcony at 19:15 CET, and while gripping the balustrade, delivered a brief speech before his first Urbi et Orbi blessing in Italian:

Praised be Jesus Christ! Dear brothers and sisters, we are still all very saddened by the death of the very dear Pope John Paul I. And now, the most eminent cardinals have called a new bishop of Rome. They called him from a far-away country...far, but always near in the communion of faith and the Christian tradition. I was afraid in receiving this nomination, but I did it in the spirit of obedience to Our Lord and with total trust in his Mother, the Most Holy Madonna. I don't know if I can express myself well in your – in our – Italian language. But if I make a mistake, you will correct me. And so I introduce myself to you all, to confess our common faith, our hope, our trust in the Mother of Christ and of the Church, and also to begin again on this path of history and of the Church with the help of God and with that of men.

== See also ==
Cardinal electors by region
Region	Number
Italy	25
Rest of Europe	29
North America	16
South America	16
Asia	9
Oceania	4
Africa	12
Total	111

- Cardinal electors in the 1978 papal conclaves
