= Petrus Canisius van Lierde =

Catholic bishop

The Most Reverend Petrus Canisius van Lierde O.S.A.
- Vicar General for the Vatican City State
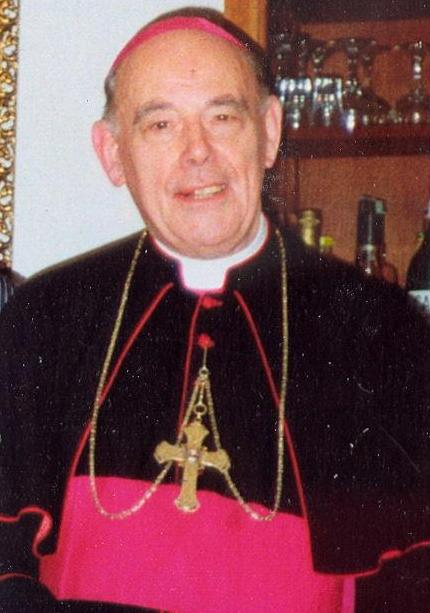
- Van Lierde on 10 October 1992
- Church: Roman Catholic Church
- Diocese: Rome
- See: Rome
- Appointed: 13 January 1951
- Term ended: 14 January 1991
- Predecessor: Alfonso Camillo De Romanis
- Successor: Aurelio Sabattani
- Other post(s): Titular Bishop of Porphyreon (1951-95)

Orders
- Ordination: 30 May 1931
- Consecration: 25 February 1951 by Giuseppe Pizzardo

Personal details
- Born: Petrus Canisius Jean van Lierde; 22 April 1907; Hasselt, Belgium
- Died: 12 March 1995 (aged 87); Roeselare, Belgium
- Motto: Custodiens veritatem ("Keeping the truth")
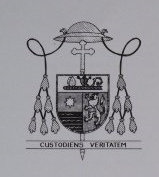
- Coat of arms

Petrus Canisius Jean van Lierde, O.S.A. (22 April 1907 – 12 March 1995), served forty years from 1951 to 1991 as Vicar General for the Vatican City State, and was the longest serving official in that position.

== Early life ==
Van Lierde was born in Hasselt, Belgium, to a Dutch family. After his education, he joined the Order of Saint Augustine and was ordained a priest on 30 May 1931. After receiving doctorates in theology and philosophy, he headed the Augustinian College Saint Monica in Rome, where he hid many refugees including military officers, Jews and anti-fascist politicians during the war years.

== Vatican service ==
On 13 January 1951, Pope Pius XII named him Titular Bishop of Porphyreon, prefect of the Papal Sacristy, and Vicar General of Vatican City. He received his episcopal consecration from Cardinal Giuseppe Cardinal Pizzardo on 25 February 1951. Van Lierde chose as his episcopal motto: Custodiens veritatem (Guarding the truth). He served as Sacristan in four papal conclaves, 1958, 1963, and twice in 1978. Pope John Paul II accepted his resignation in 1991 and named him Emeritus Vicar General. Van Lierde continued work inside the Vatican.

In 1954, when Pope Pius XII seemed likely to die, he asked van Lierde to anoint him and then lived four more years. In May 1963, Pope John XXIII asked for him in similar circumstances. On 31 May 1963 van Lierde as Papal Sacristan was at the bedside of the dying pope and began to anoint him but, overcome by emotion, forgot the right order of anointing. Pope John gently helped him. Then the Pope bid him and all the other bystanders a last farewell.

== Van Lierde and Pope Pius XII ==
Throughout his life, Van Lierde was an ardent admirer of Pope Pius XII, whose determination and courage to save lives during the German occupation of Rome he repeatedly described. According to Van Lierde, Pius XII possessed a sharp, penetrating intelligence, an extraordinary memory, a methodical way, and strong will to work, a deep love of God and of people, whom he loved through God and because of Him. He lived simply when alone, and displayed friendly reluctance, when he met strangers. He had instant capacity to understand the other person and showed great tact towards those who may have been very direct.

From 1958 to 1995, Van Lierde presided over the annual liturgical celebrations for Pope Pius XII in the crypt of Saint Peter Basilica. In presence of Cardinal Joseph Ratzinger, he led the funeral services of Madre Pascalina Lehnert in the Vatican's Campo Santo Teutonico.

Van Lierde died on 12 March 1995.

== Writings ==
- Schambeck, Herbert, ed. (1986). Pius XII. Butzon & Becker, Kevelaer.
- The Holy See at work, how the Catholic Church is governed. Translated by James Tucek. New York: Hawthorn Books. 1962.
- Prayers and devotions from John Paul II. London: Penguin. 1998. ISBN 0-14-024725-4.
- What is a Cardinal. New York: Hawthorn Books. 1964.
- Jean XXIII Témoignage pour l'histoire, témoignage, auteur Gunnar Riebs. Paris: Editions Mols. 2014.
