= August 1978 conclave =

Election of Catholic Pope John Paul I

Papal conclave August 1978

Dates and location
- 25–26 August 1978; Sistine Chapel, Apostolic Palace, Vatican City

Key officials
- Dean: Carlo Confalonieri
- Sub-dean: Paolo Marella
- Camerlengo: Jean-Marie Villot
- Protopriest: Carlos Motta
- Protodeacon: Pericle Felici
- Secretary: Ernesto Civardi

Election
- Electors: 111 (list)
- Candidates: See papabili
- Ballots: 4

Elected pope
- Albino Luciani; Name taken: John Paul I
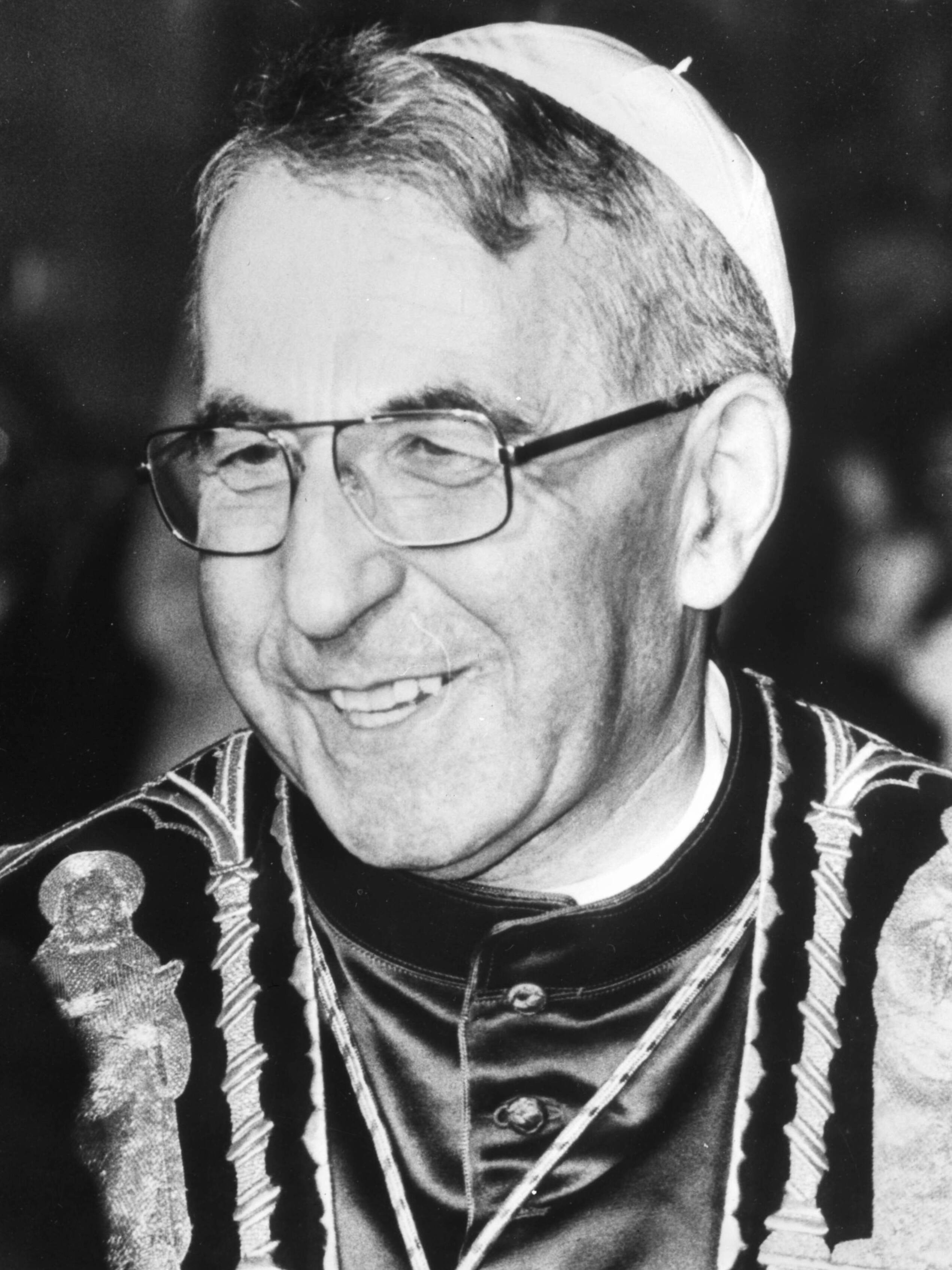

A conclave was held on 25 and 26 August 1978 to elect a new pope to succeed Paul VI, who had died on 6 August 1978. Of the 114 eligible cardinal electors, all but three attended. On the fourth ballot, the conclave elected Cardinal Albino Luciani, the patriarch of Venice. After accepting his election, he took the name John Paul I.

The first of the two conclaves held that same year, it was the first conclave since the promulgation of Ingravescentem aetatem (1970), which made cardinals who had reached the age of 80 by the day the conclave began ineligible to participate in the balloting. There were 15 cardinals excluded by that rule. The number of votes cast for Luciani on the final ballot was so great that even a theoretical uniform opposition of these 15 cardinals would not have changed the outcome.

== Papabili ==
Among the papabili, or top candidates, were President of the Secretariat for Non-Christians Sergio Pignedoli, Giuseppe Siri of Genoa, and Corrado Ursi of Naples. Others named Giovanni Benelli of Florence, until recently Vatican deputy secretary of state; Sebastiano Baggio, prefect of the Congregation for Bishops; and non-cardinal Anastasio Ballestrero, archbishop of Turin. The non-Italian most often mentioned was Johannes Willebrands, archbishop of Utrecht. Aloísio Lorscheider of Brazil, head of the Episcopal Conference of Latin America, favoured Albino Luciani, the patriarch of Venice, while Luciani himself was believed to have favoured Lorscheider. Time reported that the dean of the college, Carlo Confalonieri, who was excluded from participating due to age, had been the first to suggest Luciani.

== Proceedings ==
Newly elected Pope John Paul I (on the left) with Monsignor Virgilio Noè, then papal master of ceremonies

The conclave was held for two days, from 25 August to 26 August 1978, at the Sistine Chapel in the Vatican. Cardinal John Wright, an official of the Roman Curia, was in the U.S. for medical treatments and thus unable to attend. Proceedings on 25 August 1978 began with a Mass celebrated at St. Peter's Basilica by the cardinal electors for divine guidance in their task to elect Pope Paul VI's successor. The cardinals processed into the Sistine Chapel six hours later, while the chapel choir sang the hymn Veni Creator Spiritus. Monsignor Virgilio Noè, the papal master of ceremonies, gave the traditional command of Extra omnes ("Everybody out!"), the doors were locked, and then the actual conclave began, with Cardinal Villot presiding (as would happen again in October) due to being the senior cardinal bishop in attendance. The chapel windows remained closed, some sealed, and the summer heat was oppressive. Belgian Cardinal Leo Suenens later wrote: "My room was an oven. My cell was a kind of like a sauna." The traditional canopied thrones were replaced with twelve long tables to accommodate the electors. Cardinals Karol Wojtyła, Aloísio Lorscheider, and Bernardin Gantin reportedly served as scrutineers during the balloting.

Luciani had told his secretary that he would decline the papacy if elected. During the third ballot, Johannes Willebrands and António Ribeiro, who sat on either side of Luciani, whispered words of encouragement to him as he continued to receive more votes. Jaime Sin told Luciani, "You will be the new pope." Luciani was elected on the fourth ballot, and when Cardinal Jean-Marie Villot asked Luciani whether he accepted his election, he replied: "May God forgive you for what you have done," and accepted his election. In honor of his two immediate predecessors, he took John Paul I as his papal name. After the election, when Cardinal Sin paid him homage, the new pope noted: "You were a prophet, but my reign will be a short one."

On 26 August 1978 at 18:24 CEST (16:24 UTC), the first signs of smoke appeared from the chimney of the Sistine Chapel. For over an hour, it was unclear whether the smoke was white to indicate a pope had been elected or black to indicate that balloting would continue. Some of the cardinals had personally deposited their notes and tally sheets in the stove, darkening what should have been white smoke. Pericle Felici, as the cardinal protodeacon, then stepped onto the balcony of St. Peter's Basilica and delivered the Habemus papam in Latin, announcing Luciani's election. At 19:31 CEST, John Paul I appeared on the balcony and gave his Urbi et Orbi blessing. When he appeared about to address the crowd, he was reminded that was not traditional and withdrew without speaking further. He invited the cardinal electors to remain in conclave for another night and dined with them, occupying the same chair as he had at their earlier group dinners.

== Voting tallies ==
Several authors have provided what they claim to be the vote totals at the conclave. Cardinals were not required to destroy notes they took during the conclave.

=== Yallop ===
As presented by David Yallop, who claimed that John Paul I was murdered.

- First ballot: Siri 25, Luciani 23, Pignedoli 18, Lorscheider 12, Baggio 9, scattered 24.
- Second ballot: Siri 35, Luciani 30, Pignedoli 15, Lorscheider 12, scattered 19.
- Third ballot: Luciani 68, Siri 15, Pignedoli 10, scattered 18.
- Fourth ballot: Luciani 99, Siri 11, Lorscheider 1 (cast by Luciani). This ballot (and the alleged murder of John Paul I) appears in the film The Godfather Part III, except that the fictionalized Cardinal Lamberto stands in for Luciani.

=== Burkle-Young ===
As presented by Francis A. Burkle-Young, based on the notes of Cardinal Mario Casariego, Archbishop of Guatemala City.

- First ballot: Siri 25, Luciani 23, Pignedoli 18, Baggio 9, König 8, Bertoli 5, Pironio 4, Felici 2, Lorscheider 2, fifteen others 1 each.
- Second ballot: Luciani 53, Siri 24, Pignedoli 15, Lorscheider, Baggio, Cordeiro, Wojtyła 4 each, Felici 3.
- Third ballot: Luciani 92, Pignedoli 17, Lorscheider 2.
- Fourth ballot: Luciani 102, Lorscheider 1 (cast by Luciani), Nemini (no-one) 8.

=== Thomas-Witts ===
As presented by Gordon Thomas and Max Morgan-Witts.

- First ballot: same as Burkle-Young's count except 5 votes for Pironio, fourteen candidates with 1.
- Second ballot: Luciani 46, Pignedoli 19, Lorscheider 14, Baggio 11, Bertoli 4, others unspecified.
- Third ballot: Luciani 66, Pignedoli 21, Lorscheider 1 (cast by Aramburu), others unspecified.
- Fourth ballot: Luciani 96, Pignedoli 10, Lorscheider 1 (cast by Aramburu).

According to one report of the balloting, French traditionalist Archbishop Marcel Lefebvre received a small number of votes—variously reported as three or "several"—causing some consternation among the cardinals.

== See also ==
Cardinal electors by region
Region	Number
Italy	26
Rest of Europe	29
North America	15
South America	16
Asia	9
Oceania	4
Africa	12
Total	111

- Cardinal electors in the 1978 papal conclaves
