= Fabric of Saint Peter =

Vatican Catholic institution

The Fabric of Saint Peter or Fabbrica (Latin: Reverenda Fabrica Sancti Petri, Italian: Fabbrica di San Pietro) is a Catholic institution responsible for the conservation and maintenance of St. Peter's Basilica and exercising vigilance over its sacred character and the organization of visitors. While it is not part of the Roman Curia, the 2022 apostolic constitution Praedicate evangelium recognized it as "associated with the Holy See."

The Fabric is linked with the Vatican Chapter, which supervises the spiritual coherence of the Vatican, through the Archpriest. The Italian saying "com'a fabrica de San Pietro" (like the Fabric of Saint Peter) is used to describe a never-ending task.

== History ==
The Fabric has existed under various names and varying responsibilities since its foundation in 1523, when Pope Clement VII established a commission to build and administer the Basilica.

On 29 June 2020, Pope Francis appointed Archbishop Mario Giordana, a veteran papal diplomat, to lead a commission to reform the Fabric's administration. As Extraordinary Commissioner he is to "modernize and reorganize ... administrative and technical offices, improve transparency, and update the statutes" of the Fabric. The reorganization was achieved in March 2021.

In January 2023, the death of Monsignor Michele Basso, a canon of the basilica, attracted media attention to the art collection he had bequeathed to the Fabric of Saint Peter. The collection remained in storage beneath the dome of the basilica. The press questioned the provenance and value of the artworks, of which little is known. In 2025, the Fabric of St Peter announced they would be undergoing a number of restoration projects of various monuments and tombs in St. Peter’s Basilica as well as installing new security enhancements.

== Presidents ==
The archpriest of the Basilica is customarily the president of the Fabric.

- Paolo Marella (14 August 1961 – 8 February 1983)
- Aurelio Sabattani (8 February 1983 – 1 July 1991)
- Virgilio Noè (1 July 1991 – 24 April 2002)
- Francesco Marchisano (24 April 2002 – 5 February 2005)
- Angelo Comastri (5 February 2005 – 20 February 2021)
- Mauro Gambetti, O.F.M. Conv. (20 February 2021 – 3 October 2026)
- Vittorio Francesco Viola, O.F.M. (10 October 2026 – )
