= Ernesto Civardi =

Italian cardinal (1906–1989)

His Eminence Ernesto Civardi
- Secretary Emeritus of the Congregation for Bishops
- Church: Roman Catholic Church
- Appointed: 17 May 1967
- Term ended: 30 June 1979
- Predecessor: Francesco Carpino (Note: He served in this position for the defunct Consistorial Congregation until it became the current congregation to which Civardi was appointed to thus making him the first for the newer congregation.)
- Successor: Lucas Moreira Neves
- Other post: Cardinal-Deacon of San Teodoro (1979–1989)
- Previous posts: Undersecretary of the Consistorial Congregation (1965–1967); Titular Archbishop of Serdica (1967–1979); Secretary of the College of Cardinals (1967–1979)

Orders
- Ordination: 29 June 1930
- Consecration: 16 July 1967 by Pope Paul VI
- Created cardinal: 30 June 1979 by Pope John Paul II
- Rank: Cardinal-deacon

Personal details
- Born: Ernesto Civardi; 21 October 1906 Fossarmato, Kingdom of Italy
- Died: 28 November 1989 (aged 83) Rome, Italy
- Education: Pontifical Gregorian University
- Coat of arms

Styles of Ernesto Civardi
- Reference style: His Eminence
- Spoken style: Your Eminence
- Religious style: Monsignor
- Informal style: Cardinal

Ernesto Civardi (21 October 1906 – 28 November 1989) was an Italian cardinal of the Roman Catholic Church who served as secretary of the Sacred Congregation for Bishops from 1967 to 1979, and was made a cardinal in 1979.

== Biography ==
Civardi was born in Fossarmato, Pavia, and studied at the seminary in Pavia before being ordained to the priesthood on 29 June 1930. He then entered the Pontifical Gregorian University in Rome, from where he obtained his doctorate in canon law. He became a lawyer of the legal section of the Roman Rota as well. His elder brother Luigi (1886–1971) became a bishop in 1962.

Civardi served as vice-rector of the Pontifical Lombard Seminary in Rome from 1932 to 1934, when he began pastoral work in Rome and became an official of the Sacred Consistorial Congregation. He was raised to the rank of domestic prelate of his holiness on 15 July 1950, and was substitute (1953–1965) and undersecretary (1965–1967) of the Sacred Consistorial Congregation. Civardi was also named commissary of the Sacred Congregation for the Discipline of the Sacraments and promoter of justice on the Vatican City Tribunal in 1953. He later became a referendary (18 November 1958) and voting prelate (10 October 1962) of the Supreme Tribunal of the Apostolic Signature, and served as a peritus, or theological expert, at the Second Vatican Council (1962–1965). From 1965 to 1967, he was counselor of the Sacred Congregation for the Propagation of the Faith.

On 17 May 1967, Civardi was appointed secretary of the Sacred Congregation for Bishops by Pope Paul VI, and later Titular Archbishop of Serdica on 26 June of that year. He received his episcopal consecration on the following 16 July from Pope Paul with Bishops Augusto Gianfranceschi and Jacques-Paul Martin as co-consecrators. As secretary, Civardi served as the second-highest official of that dicastery, successively under Cardinals Carlo Confalonieri and Sebastiano Baggio. In January 1968, Civardi visited Cardinal Giacomo Lercaro, and informed him of the Pope Paul's decision to accept his resignation as Archbishop of Bologna.

On the day of his consecration he was named secretary of the Sacred College of Cardinals, in addition to his duties in the Congregation for Bishops. As such, he acted as secretary of the papal conclaves of August and October 1978, although, not being a cardinal, he could not vote. When the newly elected Pope John Paul I's private secretary, Fr. Diego Lorenzi, accidentally entered the Apostolic Palace whilst it was still sealed for the conclave and encountered Civardi, the latter jokingly said, "You realize you are excommunicated." Lorenzi, rather unfamiliar with Vatican protocol, replied, "If I am, the Pope will restore me to the Communion of Saints."

Pope John Paul II created him Cardinal-Deacon of San Teodoro in the consistory of 30 June 1979, whereupon he ceased to serve as secretary of the Congregation for Bishops. Civardi lost the right to participate in any future papal conclaves upon reaching the age of eighty on 21 October 1986. He was a self-proclaimed "man of the Curia".

The cardinal died in Rome at age 83. Following a funeral Mass celebrated by John Paul II at the altar of the Chair of St. Peter, he was buried in the chapel of the Confraternita dei Lombardi at the Campo Verano cemetery.

== Notes ==
Catholic Church titles
Preceded by Francesco Carpino	Secretary of the Sacred Congregation for Bishops; 1967–1979	Succeeded by Lucas Moreira Neves, OP
