= Virgilio Noè =

Italian Roman Catholic prelate and cardinal

His Eminence Virgilio Noè
- Vicar General Emeritus for the Vatican State; President Emeritus of the Fabric of Saint Peter; Archpriest Emeritus of Saint Peter's Basilica
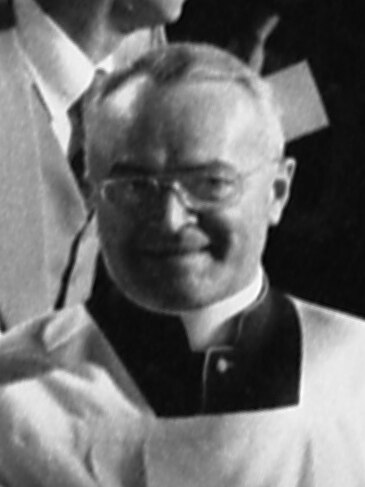
- Church: Latin Church
- Appointed: 1 July 1991
- Term ended: 24 April 2002
- Predecessor: Aurelio Sabattani
- Successor: Francesco Marchisano
- Other post: Cardinal-Priest of Regina Apostolorum (2002‍–‍2011)
- Previous posts: Undersecretary of the Congregation for Divine Worship (1969‍–‍1975); Master of Papal Liturgical Celebrations (1970‍–‍1982); Undersecretary for Divine Worship of the Congregation for Sacraments and Divine Worship (1975‍–‍1977); Adjunct Secretary for Divine Worship of the Congregation for Sacraments and Divine Worship (1977‍–‍1982); Secretary of the Congregation for Sacraments and Divine Worship (1982‍–‍1984); Titular Archbishop of Voncaria (1982‍–‍1991); Secretary of the Congregation for Divine Worship (1984‍–‍1988); Secretary of the Congregation for Divine Worship and the Discipline of the Sacraments (1988‍–‍1989); Coadjutor President of the Fabric of Saint Peter (1989‍–‍1991); Coadjutor Archpriest of Saint Peter's Basilica (1989‍–‍1991); President of the Permanent Commission for the Protection of Historical and Artistic Monuments of the Holy See (1989‍–‍2003); Coadjutor Vicar General for the Vatican State (1991); Cardinal-Deacon of San Giovanni Bosco in Via Tuscolana (1991‍–‍2002); President of the Commission of Cardinals for the Pontifical Shrines (1993‍–‍1996)

Orders
- Ordination: 1 October 1944 by Carlo Allorio
- Consecration: 6 March 1982 by Pope John Paul II
- Created cardinal: 28 June 1991 by Pope John Paul II
- Rank: Cardinal-deacon (1991‍–‍2002); Cardinal-priest (2002‍–‍2011)

Personal details
- Born: Virgilio Noè; 30 March 1922 Zelata di Bereguardo, Kingdom of Italy
- Died: 24 July 2011 (aged 89) Rome, Italy
- Buried: Campo Verano
- Education: Pontifical Gregorian University
- Motto: Deus meus misericordia mea
- Coat of arms

Styles of Virgilio Noè
- Reference style: His Eminence
- Spoken style: Your Eminence
- Religious style: Monsignor
- Informal style: Cardinal
- See: Voncaria (Titular)

Virgilio Noè (30 March 1922 – 24 July 2011) was an Italian prelate of the Catholic Church and cardinal priest. He served as Master of Pontifical Liturgical Celebrations from 1970 to 1982, and later as Archpriest of Saint Peter's Basilica, president of the Fabric of Saint Peter, and Vicar General for Vatican City from 1991 to 2002. He was made a cardinal in 2001 by Pope John Paul II.

== Early life and ministry ==
Noè was born in 1922 in Zelata di Bereguardo, Lombardy, Kingdom of Italy. He studied at the Seminary of Pavia and was ordained a priest on 1 October 1944 by the Bishop of Pavia, Carlo Allorio. After ordination he became parish priest of the parish of San Salvatore in Pavia and founded a youth association to promote participation in the liturgy.

In 1948, Bishop Allorio sent him to Rome to study at the Pontifical Gregorian University, where he earned a doctorate in ecclesiastical history in 1952, with a thesis entitled "The Religious Policies of the Lombard Kings".

He taught Ecclesiastical History, Patristics, Liturgy and Art History in the seminaries of Pavia and Tortona. He was also spiritual director in the Collegio Sant'Agostino and the Collegio San Giorgio, and played a leading role in the diocesan liturgical commission. Among the projects undertaken were diocesan Eucharistic Congresses in 1956 and 1964.

== Activity in Rome ==
In the years 1964–1969, starting therefore during the period of the Second Vatican Council, he was in charge of the national Centro di Azione Liturgica (Centre for Liturgical Action) in Rome, and editor of its journal Liturgia. He was also lecturer in Sacred Art at the recently founded Pontifical Liturgical Institute of Sant'Anselmo in the city, and when a commission was formed to revise the papal liturgical celebrations, he was made a member. From 1966 to 1968 he also served as vice-rector of the Pontifical Lombard Seminary in Rome.

When the Sacred Congregation for Divine Worship (Sacra Congregatio pro Cultu Divino) was established in 1969 to take over the historical brief for liturgical affairs handled since 1588 by the Sacred Congregation of Rites (Sacra Rituum Congregatio), Mons. Noè was appointed its Undersecretary and held the post until the Congregation's short life came to an end. In the meantime, in 1970, Pope Paul VI appointed him Master of ceremonies, a post now renamed for the first time Master of Pontifical Liturgical Celebrations and which he held until his appointment as a bishop in 1982, when Mons. John Magee was appointed to succeed him. In the same period he was chaplain to what is since called the Papal Gendarmeria.

During his period in the office, the challenge for Mons. Noè was to find ways of apply the governing principles and the practical norms of the new liturgical books that were gradually being revised and published to unique circumstances of the papal liturgy. The papal liturgy is in many respects seen as a model, but is also almost always televised and has some papal rites which in the nature of things are peculiar to it. The results of Mons. Noè's work were considered by traditionalists to be a minimization of proper traditional Catholic rites and detrimental to life of the liturgy. Critics of post-Vatican II reforms denounced alterations to St Peter's Basilica. The new papal practice which he established was moderate, sober, and simplified, which some people celebrated and others criticized. The Masses and the more frequent liturgies for beatifications and canonizations, but also the special ceremonies called for by the Jubilee of 1975, the funeral of Paul VI and the inauguration of the pontificates of his successors, were all given a novel and nontraditional shape. The issuing of booklets for the people that were collector's items in their own right became a consolidated practice.

Throughout this period, Mons. Noè's career then followed the complicated course of successive partial internal organizations of the Roman Curia. When in the summer of 1975 the Sacred Congregation for Divine Worship was amalgamated with the Sacred Congregation for the Discipline of the Sacraments (Sacra Congregatio de Disciplina Sacramentorum) (founded in 1908 by Pope Pius X) to form a Sacred Congregation for the Sacraments and Divine Worship (Sacra Congregatio de Sacramentis et Cultu Divino), Mons. Noè was appointed Undersecretary in charge of liturgical affairs.

== Archbishop and Cardinal ==
On 30 January 1982, Noè was appointed Secretary of the Congregation for Divine Worship and the Discipline of the Sacraments and made Titular Archbishop of Voncaria. He was ordained a bishop on 6 March 1982 in St. Peter's Basilica by Pope John Paul II, assisted by Archbishop Eduardo Martínez Somalo and Antonio Giuseppe Angioni, Bishop of Pavia.

Between 1984 and 1988 the dicastery was briefly redivided into the Congregation for the Sacraments (Congregatio de Sacramentis) and the Congregation for Divine Worship (Congregatio de Cultu Divino) under a single Prefect. In this new version of the latter, Archbishop Noè was the sole Archbishop Secretary, according to the classic system. Then, as a result of the Apostolic Constitution Pastor Bonus of 1988, this move was reversed and there emerged the Congregation for Divine Worship and the Discipline of the Sacraments (Sacra Congregatio de Cultu Divino de et Disciplina Sacramentorum), which still exists. In this new entity, Archbishop Noè was no longer the sole Archbishop Secretary, but reverted to being once more Archbishop Secretary but in charge of a distinct section for Divine Worship.

On 15 May 1989, Noè was named Coadjutor Archpriest of St. Peter's Basilica, giving him the right to succeed the ailing Cardinal Aurelio Sabattani in that position. At the same time he was appointed Delegate of the Fabric of St. Peter, (Note: The Fabric of St. Peter is not part of the Roman Curia but is "closely associated with the Holy See.) a body he could expect to head as Archpriest.

Noè was made Cardinal-Deacon of San Giovanni Bosco in Via Tuscolana in the consistory of 28 June 1991 by Pope John Paul II. Three days later, upon the retirement of Cardinal Sabattani, he was made Archpriest of St. Peter's Basilica, President of the Fabric of St. Peter, and Vicar General of Vatican City.

From 1993 to 1996 he was also President of the Cardinalatial Commission for the Pontifical Shrines of Pompei, Loreto and Bari.

After 10 years as Cardinal-Deacon, Noè took the option of elevation to the rank of Cardinal-Priest with the titular church of Regina Apostolorum as of 26 February 2002. He once said that Pope Paul VI spoke of the "smoke of Satan" when referring to priests who celebrated Mass badly.

== Death and Burial ==
On 24 July 2011, Cardinal Noè died in Rome at the age of 89. His funeral Mass was celebrated on 26 July 2011 in the apse of St. Peter's Basilica, by Cardinal Angelo Sodano, Dean of the College of Cardinals and concelebrated by a large number of Cardinals and bishops. He is buried in the cemetery of Campo Verano, Rome.

== Notes ==
Catholic Church titles
Preceded by Annibale Bugnini	Master of Pontifical Liturgical Celebrations; 9 January 1970 – 6 March 1982	Succeeded by John Magee
Preceded by Egano Righi-Lambertini	Cardinal-Deacon of San Giovanni Bosco in Via Tuscolana; 28 June 1991 – 26 February 2002	Succeeded by Stephen Fumio Hamao
Preceded by Aurelio Sabattani	Vicar General of His Holiness for the State of Vatican City; 1 July 1991 – 24 April 2002	Succeeded by Francesco Marchisano
Preceded by Aurelio Sabattani	Archpriest of the Basilica of Saint Peter; 1 July 1991 – 24 April 2002	Succeeded by Francesco Marchisano
Preceded by Aurelio Sabattani	President of the Fabric of Saint Peter; 1 July 1991 – 24 April 2002	Succeeded by Francesco Marchisano
