= Aurelio Sabattani =

Italian cardinal

His Eminence Aurelio Sabattani
- Prefect Emeritus of the Apostolic Signatura
- Church: Roman Catholic Church
- Appointed: 3 February 1983
- Term ended: 1 July 1988
- Predecessor: Pericle Felici
- Successor: Achille Silvestrini
- Other post: Cardinal-Priest pro hac vice of Sant'Apollinare alle Terme Neroniane-Alessandrine (1993–2003)
- Previous posts: Prelate of Loreto (1965–71); Titular Archbishop of Iustiniana prima (1965–83); Apostolic Administrator of Cingoli (1968–69); Secretary of the Apostolic Signatura (1971–82); Pro-Prefect of the Apostolic Signatura (1982–83); Cardinal-Deacon of Sant'Apollinare alle Terme Neroniane-Alessandrine (1983–93); President of the Fabric of Saint Peter (1983–91); Archpriest of Saint Peter's Basilica (1983–91); Cardinal Protodeacon (1990–93); Vicar General of Rome (1991)

Orders
- Ordination: 26 July 1935 by Antonio Scarante
- Consecration: 25 July 1965 by Amleto Giovanni Cicognani
- Created cardinal: 2 February 1983 by Pope John Paul II
- Rank: Cardinal-Deacon (1983–93); Cardinal-Priest (1993–2003)

Personal details
- Born: Aurelio Sabattani; 18 October 1912 Casalfiumanese, Kingdom of Italy
- Died: 19 April 2003 (aged 90) Vatican City
- Education: Pontifical Roman Athenaeum S. Apollinare
- Motto: Radicatus in caritate
- Coat of arms

Styles of Aurelio Sabattani
- Reference style: His Eminence
- Spoken style: Your Eminence
- Informal style: Cardinal
- See: Giustiniana (titular see)

Aurelio Sabattani JUD (18 October 1912 – 19 April 2003) was an Italian cardinal of the Roman Catholic Church. He served as Prefect of the Apostolic Signatura from 1967 until his death and was elevated to the rank of cardinal in 1983.

== Education ==
He was educated at the Seminary of Imola, from 1922 until 1925 as well as the Regional Seminary Benedetto XV in Bologna from 1927 until 1934 where he earned a master's degree in dogmatic theology. He continued his studies at the Pontifical Institute "S. Apollinare" in Rome where he earned a doctorate utroque iuris (in both canon and civil law), with his thesis on De vita et operibus Alexandri Tartagni de Imola, 1939.

== Priesthood ==
He was ordained on 26 July 1935 at the episcopal chapel in Faenza, by Antonio Scarante, Bishop of Faenza. After a brief service in the Vatican Secretariat of State (1939–1940), he had to return to his diocese because of family affairs. He was from 1940 until 1955 successively in Imola, diocesan chancellor; faculty member of its seminary; diocesan counselor of Christian Teachers; cathedral canon; in Bologna, judge and official of the regional ecclesiastical tribunal; while during the summer months of 1942 until 1947, he worked at the Vatican Secretariat of State. He was created Privy chamberlain supra numerum on 30 September 1943. He was named auditor of the Roman Rota on 31 January 1955. The cardinal vicar of Rome named him spiritual counselor of the Catholic Physicians Association of Rome in 1955, holding that post until 1965.

== Episcopate ==
Pope Paul VI appointed him titular archbishop of Justiniana Prima and appointed him Prelate of Loreto and pontifical delegate of its shrine on 24 June 1965. He was consecrated on 25 July of that year by Amleto Giovanni Cicognani, Cardinal Secretary of State. He was appointed as Secretary of the Supreme Tribunal of the Apostolic Signatura on 13 July 1971. He resigned the pastoral government of the prelature on 30 September 1971. He was appointed as Pro-Prefect of the Supreme Tribunal of the Apostolic Signatura and Pro-president of the Vatican Court of Appeal on 17 May 1982.

== Cardinalate ==
He was made Cardinal-Deacon of Sant'Apollinare alle Terme Neroniane-Alessandrine by Pope John Paul II in the consistory of 2 February 1983. He was appointed Prefect the next day. Pope John Paul named him Archpriest of St. Peter's Basilica and President of the Fabric of St. Peter on 8 February of that year. He resigned the prefecture of the Signatura on 1 July 1988. He was the protodeacon of the College of Cardinals from 26 November 1990 until he became a cardinal-priest on 5 April 1993. He resigned the post of archpriest in 1991. He opted for the order of cardinal priests and his deaconry was elevated pro hac vice to title in April 1993. He died in 2003 in Piazza Santa Marta in Vatican City and is buried in his family's tomb in Riolo Terme.

Catholic Church titles
Preceded by Pericle Felici	Prefect of the Supreme Tribunal of the Apostolic Signatura; 3 February 1983 – 1 July 1988	Succeeded by Achille Silvestrini
Preceded by Paolo Marella	Archpriest of St. Peter's Basilica; 8 February 1983 – 1 July 1991	Succeeded by Virgilio Noè
Preceded by Giuseppe Caprio	Cardinal Protodeacon; 26 November 1990 – 5 April 1993	Succeeded by Duraisamy Simon Lourdusamy
Preceded by Petrus Canisius Van Lierde	Vicar General for Vatican City; 14 January 1991 – 1 July 1991	Succeeded by Virgilio Noè
