= Egano Righi-Lambertini =

Italian prelate

His Eminence Egano Righi-Lambertini
- Cardinal-Priest of Santa Maria in Via
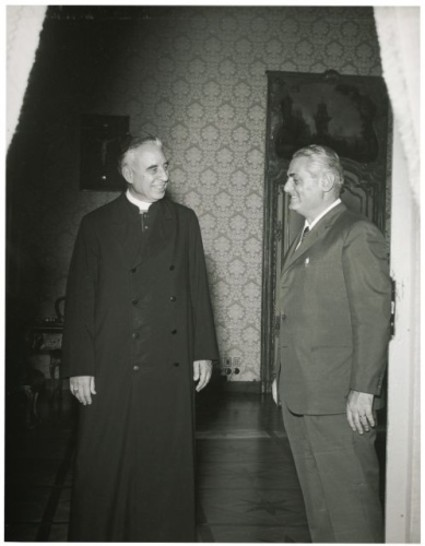
- Righi-Lambertini in 1967 alongside the President of the Italian Chamber of Deputies Brunetto Bucciarelli-Ducci.
- Church: Roman Catholic Church
- Appointed: 26 November 1990
- Term ended: 4 October 2000
- Predecessor: Joseph-Marie Trịnh Văn Căn
- Successor: Antonio José González Zumárraga
- Previous posts: Apostolic Delegate to South Korea (1957–60); Apostolic Nuncio to Lebanon (1960–63); Titular Archbishop of Doclea (1960–79); Apostolic Nuncio to Chile (1963–67); Apostolic Nuncio to Italy (1967–69); Apostolic Nuncio to France (1969–79); Cardinal-Deacon of San Giovanni Bosco in Via Tuscolana (1979–90)

Orders
- Ordination: 25 May 1929 by Giovanni Battista Nasalli Rocca di Corneliano
- Consecration: 28 October 1960 by Pope John XXIII
- Created cardinal: 30 June 1979 by Pope John Paul II
- Rank: Cardinal-Deacon (1979–90); Cardinal-Priest (1990–2000)

Personal details
- Born: Egano Righi-Lambertini; 22 February 1906 Casalecchio di Reno, Kingdom of Italy
- Died: 4 October 2000 (aged 94) Rome, Italy
- Education: Pontifical Gregorian University; Pontifical Ecclesiastical Academy
- Coat of arms

Egano Righi-Lambertini (22 February 1906 – 4 October 2000) was an Italian prelate of the Catholic Church.

He spent decades in the diplomatic service of the Holy See and from 1957 to 1974 held a series of appointments as Papal Delegate to Korea and then Papal Nuncio to Lebanon, Chile, Italy, and France. He was made a cardinal in 1979.

== Biography ==
Righi-Lambertini was born on 22 February 1906 in Casalecchio di Reno, Italy. He attended the Pontifical Regional Seminary of Bologna and was ordained a priest of the Archdiocese of Bologna on 25 May 1929.

To prepare for a diplomatic career he entered the Pontifical Ecclesiastical Academy in 1935.

Beginning in 1939, he held positions of increasing responsibility in the diplomatic service of the Holy See, serving in Italy, France, Costa Rica and Venezuela and in the apostolic delegation to Great Britain. On 10 December 1957, he was named Apostolic Delegate to Korea.

On 9 July 1960, he was appointed Titular Archbishop of Doclea and Apostolic Nuncio to Lebanon.

On 28 October 1960, he received his episcopal consecration from Pope John XXIII.

On 3 December 1963, he was appointed Apostolic Nuncio to Chile.

On 8 July 1967, he was appointed Apostolic Nuncio to Italy.

On 23 April 1969, he was appointed Apostolic Nuncio to France.

He was made a cardinal by Pope John Paul II in the consistory held on 30 June 1979 and became Cardinal-Deacon of San Giovanni Bosco in Via Tuscolana. On 24 July 1979, he was named a member of the Council for the Public Affairs of the Church, the Congregation for Bishops, and the Secretariat for Non-Christians.

On 26 November 1990, he exercised his option to take the title Cardinal-Priest and was assigned the titular church of Santa Maria in Via.

He died in Rome on 4 October 2000 and his remains were interred in the cemetery of the town, where he was born.
