= Leo Scheffczyk =

German cardinal and theologian (1920–2005)

His Eminence Leo Scheffczyck
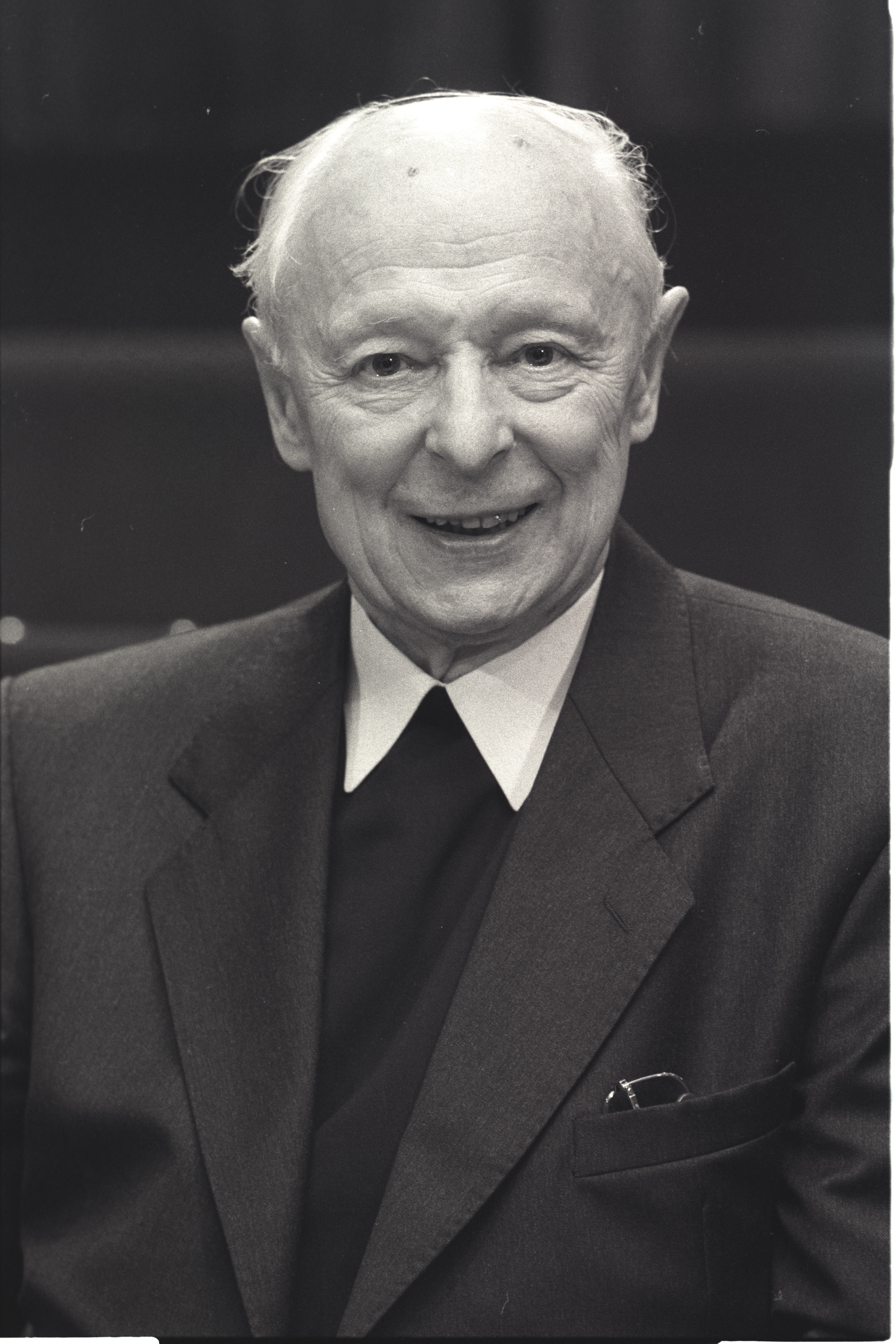
- Appointed: 21 February 2001
- Other post: Cardinal-Deacon of San Francesco Saverio alla Garbatella

Orders
- Ordination: 29 June 1947
- Created cardinal: 21 February 2001 by Pope John Paul II
- Rank: Cardinal-Priest

Personal details
- Born: Leo Scheffczyk; 21 February 1920 Beuthen, Silesia, Germany (modern Bytom, Poland)
- Died: 8 December 2005 Munich, Bavaria, Germany
- Denomination: Roman Catholic
- Motto: Evangelizare investigabiles divitias Christi
- Coat of arms

Coat of arms

Leo Scheffczyk ([ˈleːo ˈʃɛf.tʃɪk]; 21 February 1920 – 8 December 2005) was a German cardinal and theologian. He was a long-time theologian at the Congregation for the Doctrine of the Faith and one of the strongest advocates for orthodoxy during the long pontificate of John Paul II. During the 1980s and 1990s, he severely criticized some of his former students, including Leonardo Boff, one of the founders of liberation theology. Scheffczyk likely played a major role in drafting the most notable documents of John Paul's pontificate, such as Ordinatio sacerdotalis and Ad tuendam fidem. He was made a cardinal in 2001. He was regarded as an important thinker in late twentieth-century Catholicism.

== Life and career ==
Scheffczyk was born in the city of Beuthen, then in the Weimar Republic (today Bytom, Poland). He studied during World War II at the famous theological department of the University of Breslau. He moved afterwards to the Ludwig-Maximilians-Universität München. On 29 June 1947, he was ordained as a priest for the Archdiocese of Munich.

Immediately, Scheffczyk took to theological work and within a year of his ordination he was already a Theology professor at the seminary in Königstein im Taunus. He later moved to the more prestigious university at Tübingen. During that time his theological knowledge was already immensely appreciated by his students, including such notables as Walter Kasper. Whilst he was immensely knowledgeable on such subjects as the Virgin Mary, Scheffczyk was not then considered a likely choice for a promotion into the papal curia. Unlike such theologians as Yves Congar, he remained remote from the proceedings of Vatican II, though he undoubtedly understood its thought very well.

His return to the Ludwig-Maximilians-Universität München (LMU Munich) in 1965 coincided with long periods of writing on various theological topics.

After 1978, Scheffczyk was given the honorific title of monsignor. Though still focusing on writing theology, he did an increasing amount of work in the Congregation for the Doctrine of the Faith, often being consulted by the Prefect, Cardinal Ratzinger, as the Congregation devoted itself to settling a range of theological questions. However, Scheffczyk apparently never had any desire to become a public figure.

=== Cardinal ===
John Paul II, responding to requests made, among others, by Cardinals Ratzinger and Dulles, appointed Scheffczyk a cardinal on 21 February 2001. The title attributed to him was Cardinal-Deacon of San Francesco Saverio alla Garbatella. Given his advanced age, Scheffczyk successfully requested a dispensation from being consecrated a bishop (as is normally required by modern canonical law).

=== Mariology ===
Scheffczyk was a Mariologist of vast scope, and shown in his role as co-editor and major contributor to the Marienlexikon, a work which totals some 4000 pages. In his article on Mariology at the Second Vatican Council, he asserts that in pursuing the goal of unity among Christians, though this was legitimate, nevertheless Marian beliefs and devotions had been understated by some representatives of the Catholic Church. In his view this was the case with the final chapter of the Vatican II Dogmatic Constitution Lumen gentium, dealing with the Virgin Mary. For Scheffczyk, in this Marian chapter: "The coldness and reserve of this document can be explained, as it is openly admitted, by its showing consideration for ecumenical dialogues especially with Protestants. Though justifiable, this method's success should not be overrated and does not prevent theology from saying more." He disagreed with those who considered the document as failing to satisfy conservatives, liberals, Orthodox and Protestants, stating that the document contains tangible elements for a mariological bridging of positions, though he concludes that such as result had to date not been achieved. He regretted, however, that:

The decisive fundamental affirmations (on Mary) are compromises, which narrow the richness of the existing faith and open the way to divergent interpretations, such as the accusation that the Council eliminated the Mediatrix teachings.

=== Works in English, Selected ===
Scheffczyk wrote an Epilog to the 1994 re-release of the book Die leibhaftige Kirche by Ida Friederike Görres. This essay appears as a Foreword to the English translation of this book, The Church in the Flesh, published in 2023.
