= Furnos Maior and Furnos Minor =

Two towns in present-day Tunisia

Furnos was the name of two towns and bishoprics in the Roman province of Proconsular Africa (in present-day Tunisia). They are referred to as Furnos Maior and Furnos Minor, as now as separate Latin Catholic titular sees.

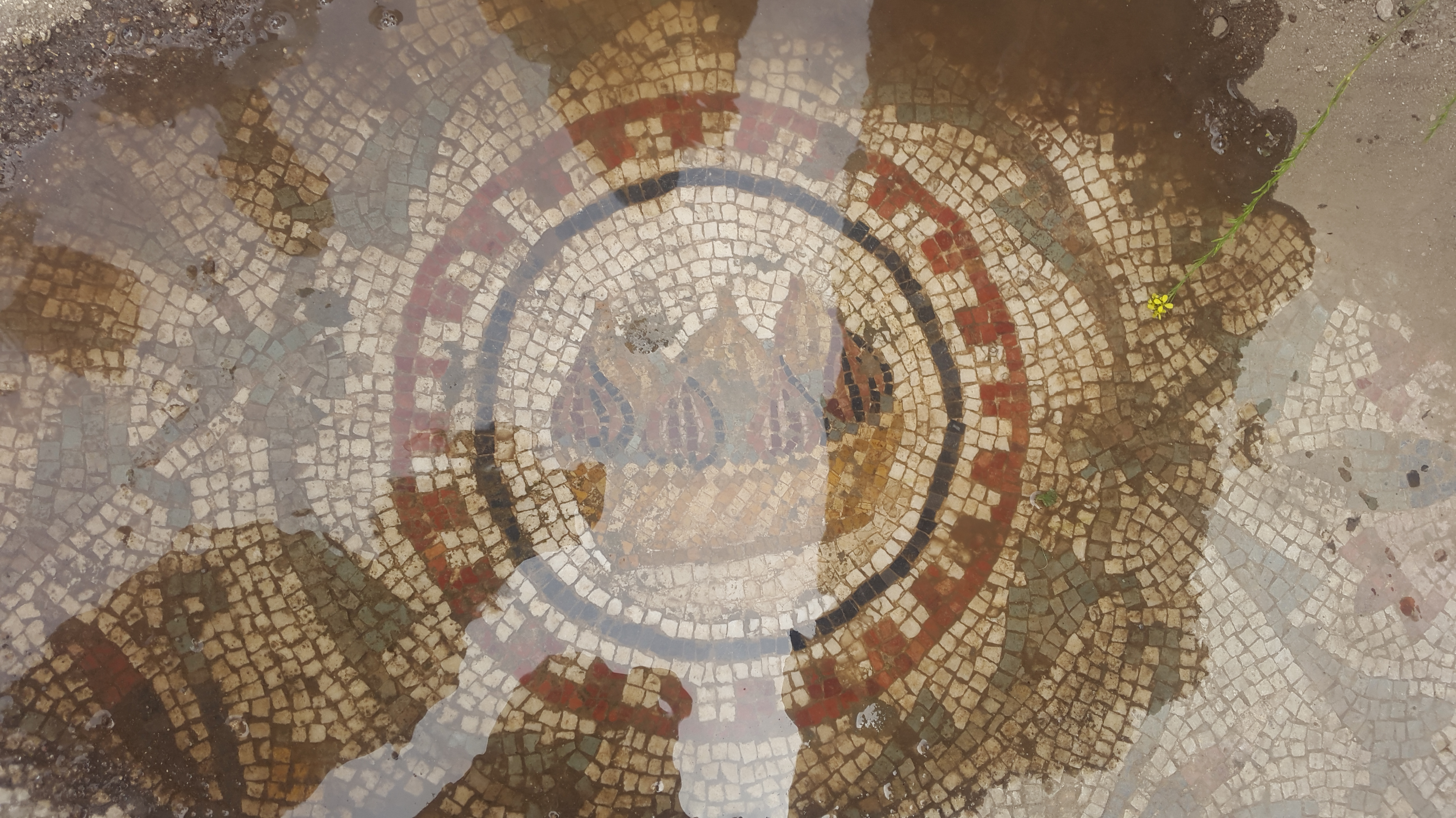
Figs Mosaic at Furnos Minus

== Locations ==
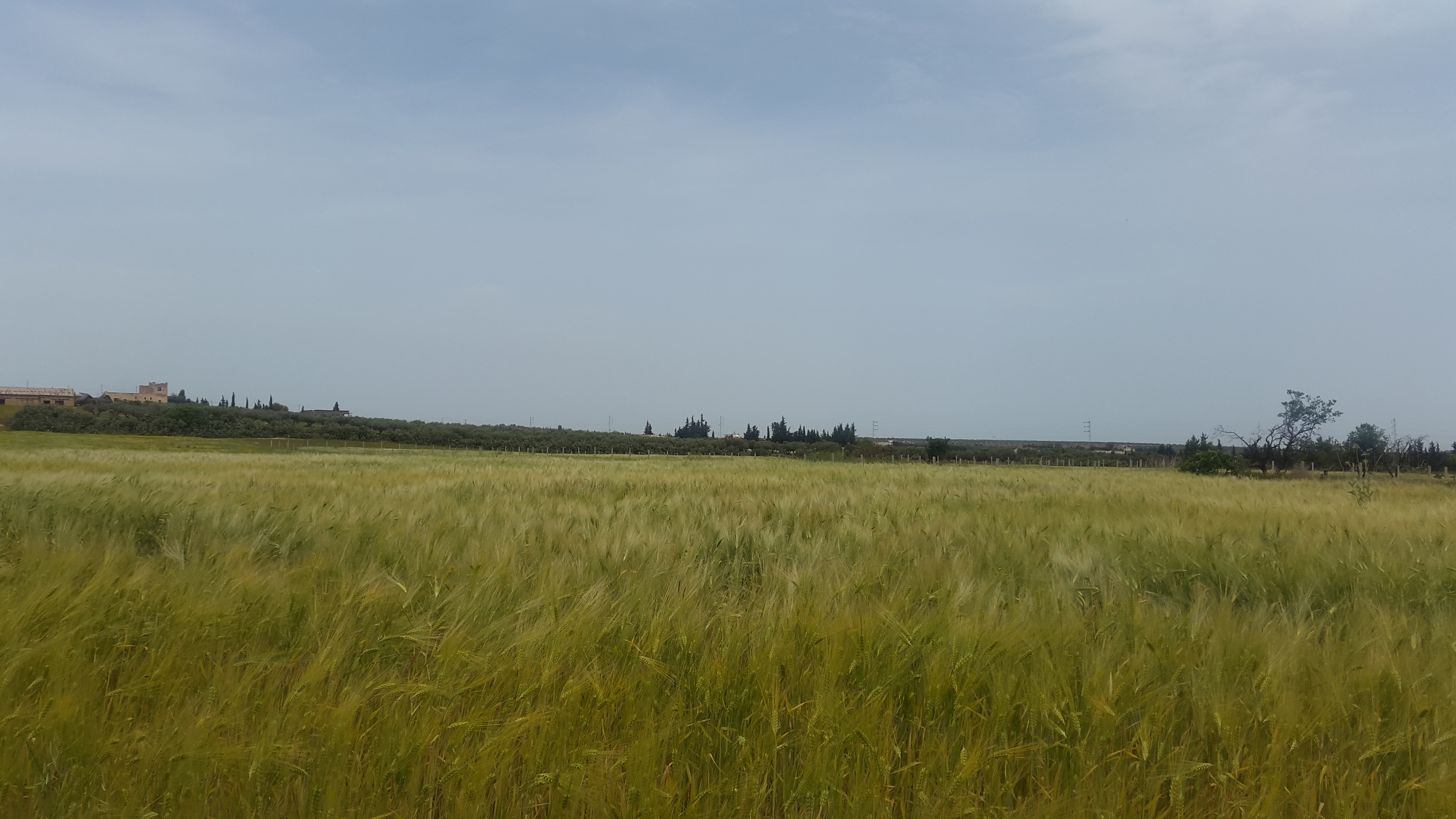
Site of Furnos Minus today

- The ruins of Furnos Minor are at Henchir-El-Msaadine, near Tebourba (Ancient bishopric Thuburbo Minus) in modern Tunisia, North Africa
- Furnos Maior may have been at what is now Aïn-Fournou or Aïn-Fourna, more distant from Carthage.

== History ==
Each was important enough to become a suffragan bishopric of the African provincial capital's Metropolitan Archbishop of Carthage.

The towns and the bishoprics disappeared after the Muslim conquest of the Maghreb, but their dioceses have been revived as titular sees.

There are records of early bishops of one or other of the two sees. Third-century Geminius died shortly before Saint Cyprian; a Donatist Florentinus attended a conference in 411; and a Simeon was at the Council of Carthage (525). Simeon belonged to Furnos Maior, but it is uncertain of which town the other two were bishops.

Victor of Vita recounts that in the persecution by the Vandals of Genseric in 430 or 431 Bishop Mansuetus of Urusi was martyred by being burned alive at the gate of Urusi known as the Porta Fornitana, the 'Furnos Gate'.

== Titular see of Furnos Maior ==
The diocese was nominally restored as a Latin Catholic titular bishopric in 1914 under the name Furnos Majus (or Maius), which was changed to Furni Majus in 1925, Furnos Maior (or Major) in 1929, Fornos Major in 1933, ultimately Furnos Maior again in 1971.

It has had the following incumbents, so far of the Episcopal (lowest) rank:

- José Anselmo Luque (25 May 1914 – death 5 April 1930) as Auxiliary Bishop of Córdoba (Argentina) (25 May 1914 – 5 April 1930)
- Julien-Marie Nouailles, Picpus Fathers (SS.CC.) (born France) (26 April 1932 – death 14 August 1937) as Apostolic Vicar of Tahiti Islands (French Polynesia) (26 April 1932 – 14 August 1937)
- Marcel-Auguste-Marie Grandin, Holy Ghost Fathers (C.S.Sp.) (2 December 1937 – death 4 August 1947) first as only Apostolic Vicar of Oubangui Chari (colonial French name of Central African Republic) (2 December 1937 – 28 May 1940), then (see) renamed after its see) 'first' Apostolic Vicar of Bangui (Central African Republic) (28 May 1940 – 4 August 1947); previously last Apostolic Prefect of Oubangui Chari (2 May 1928 – 2 December 1937)
- Thomas F. Quinlan (구 토마), Columban Missionaries (S.S.C.M.E.) (20 September 1955 – 10 March 1962) as Apostolic Vicar of Chuncheon 춘천 (South Korea) (20 September 1955 – 10 March 1962), also President of Catholic Bishops’ Conference of Korea (1959–1964); later (see promoted) 'first' Bishop of Chuncheon 춘천 (South Korea) (10 March 1962 – 16 November 1965), emeritus as Titular Bishop of Bocconia (16 November 1965 – death 13 December 1970); previously Apostolic Prefect of Shunsen (future South Korea) (1940–1943 and 12 November 1948 – 16 July 1950), see restyled Apostolic Prefect of Chuncheon 춘천 (South Korea) (16 July 1950 – 20 September 1955)
- René-Jean-Baptiste-Germain Feuga, Paris Foreign Missions Society (M.E.P.) (born France) (20 November 1962 – death 27 January 1964) as emeritus, former Bishop of Mysore (India) (3 April 1941 – retired 20 November 1962), and a while Apostolic Administrator of Mysore (20 November 1962 – 16 November 1963)
- Ismael Blas Rolón Silvero, Salesians (S.D.B.) (20 October 1965 – 29 March 1967), as Bishop-Prelate of Territorial Prelature of Caacupé (Paraguay) (2 August 1960 – 29 March 1967), promoted first Bishop of the above Caacupé (29 March 1967 – 16 June 1970), later Metropolitan Archbishop of Asunción (Paraguay) (16 June 1970 – 20 May 1989), President of Episcopal Conference of Paraguay (1985–1989)
- Michele Alagna Foderá, S.D.B. (13 June 1967 – 26 May 1978)
- James Patterson Lyke, Friars Minor (O.F.M.) (30 June 1979 – 10 July 1990) as Auxiliary Bishop of Diocese of Cleveland (USA) (30 June 1979 – 10 July 1990), later Metropolitan Archbishop of Archdiocese of Atlanta (USA) (30 April 1991 – 27 December 1992)
- Julio Enrique Prado Bolaños (8 July 1992 – 2 February 1995)
- Héctor Sabatino Cardelli (13 May 1995 – 2 May 1998)
- Jorge Eduardo Lozano (4 January 2000 – 22 December 2005)
- Alessandro Carmelo Ruffinoni, Scalabrinians (C.S.) (18 January 2006 – 16 June 2010)
- Agenor Girardi, Sacred Heart Missionaries (M.S.C.) (22 December 2010 – 6 May 2015)
- Aliaksandr Yasheuski, S.D.B. (9 September 2015 – present), Auxiliary Bishop of Archdiocese of Minsk–Mohilev (Belarus).

== Titular see of Furnos Minor ==
It was nominally revived as a titular bishopric in 1933 and has had the following incumbents, mostly of the fitting Episcopal (lowest) rank, usually) with an Archiepiscopal exception:

- Titular Archbishop Charles Journet (Swiss) (12 February 1965 – 22 February 1965), simultaneously created Cardinal-Deacon of S. Maria in Portico (25 February 1965 – 5 March 1973); later Protodeacon of the Sacred College of Cardinals (10 August 1971 – 5 March 1973), promoted Cardinal-Priest still of S. Maria in Portico pro hac vice Title (5 March 1973.03.05 – death 15 April 1975)
- Titular Bishop Georges-Louis Mercier, White Fathers (M. Afr.) (11 January 1968 – 13 October 1976) as emeritus, died 1991; previously last Apostolic Prefect of Ghardaïa nel Sahara (French Algeria) (1941 – 10 June 1948), (see) promoted only Apostolic Vicar of Ghardaïa nel Sahara (Algeria) (10 June 1948 – 14 September 1955) and Titular Bishop of Celerina (21 June 1948 – 14 September 1955), (see) promoted again first Bishop of Laghouat (Algeria) (14 September 1955 – 11 January 1968)
- Titular Bishop Attilio Nicora (16 April 1977 – 30 June 1992) as Auxiliary Bishop of Archdiocese of Milan(o) (Italy) (16 April 1977 – 11 February 1987), later Bishop of Verona (Italy) (30 June 1992 – 18 September 1997), vice-president of Council of European Bishops’ Conferences (2000–2002), Member of the Commission of Cardinals overseeing the Institute for Works of Religion (2002? – 16 February 2013), Archbishop ad personam (1 October 2002 – 21 October 2003), President of the Administration of the Patrimony of the Apostolic See (1 October 2002 – 7 July 2011), created Cardinal-Deacon of S. Filippo Neri in Eurosia (21 October 2003 [13 December 2003] – 12 June 2014), Pontifical Legate for the papal Basilicas of St. Francis and St. Mary of the Angels, both in Assisi (21 February 2006 – ...), President of the papal Financial Information Authority (19 January 2011 – 30 January 2014), promoted Cardinal-Priest of S. Filippo Neri in Eurosia pro hac vice Title (12 June 2014 – death 22 April 2017), Member of the College for the review of appeals by clergy accused of delicta graviora (21 January 2015 – 22 April 2017)
- Titular Bishop Henryk Marian Tomasik (21 November 1992 – 16 October 2009) as Auxiliary Bishop of Diocese of Siedlce (Poland) (21 November 1992 – 16 October 2009); later Bishop of Radom (Poland) (16 October 2009 – ...)
- Titular Bishop William Terrence McGrattan (6 November 2009 – 8 April 2014) as Auxiliary Bishop of Archdiocese of Toronto (Ontario, Canada) (6 November 2009 – 8 April 2014); later Bishop of Peterborough (Canada) (8 April 2014 – 4 January 2017), Bishop of Calgary (Canada) (4 January 2017 – ...)
- Titular Bishop Ernesto Maguengue (6 August 2014 – ...), as Auxiliary Bishop of Archdiocese of Nampula (Mozambique) and Apostolic Administrator of the same Nampula (25 July 2016 – 11 April 2017); previously Bishop of Pemba (Mozambique) (24 June 2004 – 27 October 2012).

== See also ==
- List of Catholic dioceses in Tunisia

== Sources and external links ==
- GigaCatholic Furnos Maior, with titular incumbent biography links
- GigaCatholic Furnos Minor, with titular incumbent biography links

Bibliography

- Stefano Antonio Morcelli, Africa christiana, Volume I, Brescia 1816, pp. 162–163
- J. Mesnage, L'Afrique chrétienne, Paris 1912, p. 122
- Duval Noël, L'évêque et la cathédrale en Afrique du Nord, in Actes du XIe congrès international d'archéologie chrétienne, École Française de Rome, 1989, p. 395
