= Agostino Cacciavillan =

Italian Catholic cardinal and bishop (1926–2022)

His Eminence Agostino Cacciavillan
- President of the Administration of the Patrimony of the Apostolic See; Cardinal-Priest of Santi Angeli Custodi a Città Giardino
- Appointed: 5 November 1998
- Term ended: 1 October 2002
- Predecessor: Lorenzo Antonetti
- Successor: Attilio Nicora
- Previous posts: Titular Archbishop of Amiternum (1976–2001); Apostolic Pro-Nuncio to Kenya (1976–1981); Apostolic Pro-Nuncio to India (1981–1985); Apostolic Pro-Nuncio to Nepal (1985–1990); Apostolic Pro-Nuncio to United States of America (1990–1998); President of the Administration of the Patrimony of the Apostolic See (1998–2002)

Orders
- Ordination: 26 June 1949
- Consecration: 28 February 1976 by Jean-Marie Villot
- Created cardinal: 21 February 2001 by Pope John Paul II
- Rank: Cardinal priest

Personal details
- Born: 14 August 1926 Valdagno, Italy
- Died: 5 March 2022 (aged 95) Vatican City
- Denomination: Roman Catholic
- Education: Pontifical Ecclesiastical Academy
- Motto: In Virtute Dei
- Coat of arms

Styles of Agostino Cacciavillan
- Reference style: His Eminence
- Spoken style: Your Eminence
- Religious style: Cardinal
- Informal style: Cardinal

Agostino Cacciavillan (14 August 1926 – 5 March 2022) was an Italian prelate of the Catholic Church, and a cardinal since 2001. He worked in the diplomatic service of the Holy See from 1959 to 1998; he was given the titles of archbishop and nuncio in 1998 and served as Pro-Nuncio to Kenya, India, Nepal, and the United States between 1976 and 1998. He then worked in the Roman Curia from 1998 to 2002 as President of the Administration of the Patrimony of the Apostolic See.

== Early life ==
Cacciavillan was born on 14 August 1926 in Novale di Valdagno; he had eight siblings. He studied at the seminary of Vicenza, and was ordained to the priesthood on 26 June 1949. He served as a curate for three years and then obtained a licentiate in social sciences at the Pontifical Gregorian University and at Sapienza University earned a doctorate in jurisprudence. In preparation for a diplomat’s career, he completed the course of study at the Pontifical Ecclesiastical Academy in 1957.

== Diplomatic career ==
Cacciavillan entered the diplomatic service of the Holy See in 1959. He served as secretary of the nunciature to the Philippines (1960–1964), of the nunciature to Spain (1964–1968), and of the nunciature to Portugal (1968). From 1969 to 1974, he worked in the Vatican Secretariat of State, where he was also head of the Office of Information and Documentation. He was raised to the rank of Honorary Prelate on 26 August 1973.

On 17 January 1976, Cacciavillan was appointed Pro-Nuncio to Kenya and Apostolic Delegate to the Seychelles, as well as Titular Archbishop of Amiternum, by Pope Paul VI. He received his episcopal consecration on 21 February from Cardinal Jean-Marie Villot, with Archbishop Duraisamy Simon Lourdusamy and Bishop Carlo Fanton serving as co-consecrators, at St. Peter's Basilica. He selected as his episcopal motto: "In Virtute Dei".

While nuncio to Kenya, Cacciavillan also served as Permanent Observer to the United Nations Environment Programme and the United Nations Human Settlements Programme. He was named Pro-Nuncio to India on 9 May 1981, and the first Pro-Nuncio to Nepal on 30 April 1985. On 13 June 1990, he was named to succeed Archbishop Pio Laghi as Pro-Nuncio to the United States and Permanent Observer of the Holy See to the Organization of American States. He also served as the Holy See's representative to the World Association of Jurists.

While nuncio to the United States, Cacciavillan recalled years later, he received a phone call in 1994 from a woman warning of a "media scandal" if Pope John Paul II's 1995 visit to the United States included Newark, New Jersey where Archbishop Theodore McCarrick was the subject of rumors about inappropriate behavior with seminarians. He said that he forwarded the information to Cardinal John O'Connor, Archbishop of New York, and did not contact the Vatican. He was instrumental in the promotion of McCarrick to the see of Washington in 1999 over O'Connor's objections. In a letter to Cardinal Re, who had asked him for advice on McCarrick at the request of Pope John Paul II, Cacciavillan argued that no enquiry should be made into these letters' claims because "Nothing new would be learned, and worse, a 'trial situation' could be created against Msgr. McCarrick, leaving the impression of great concern, which would have the effect of receiving answers in harmony with the expressed concern, rather than a de-dramatization, whereas a de-dramatization might perhaps be justified."

== Curia career ==
On 5 November 1998, Pope John Paul II appointed Cacciavillan to a five-year term as President of the Administration of the Patrimony of the Apostolic See (APAS). He was created Cardinal-Deacon of Santi Angeli Custodi a Città Giardino in the consistory of 21 February 2001. He retired as President of the APAS when his resignation was accepted and he was replaced as president on 1 October 2002 by Attilio Nicora. Cacciavillan was one of the cardinal electors who participated in the 2005 papal conclave that elected Pope Benedict XVI.

Cacciavillan, as the longest serving cardinal deacon, was Cardinal Protodeacon, the cardinal who makes the Habemus Papam announcement upon the conclusion of a papal conclave, from 1 March 2008, when Cardinal Darío Castrillón Hoyos became a cardinal priest until 21 February 2011, when he became a cardinal priest himself. In the Roman Curia, he was a member of the Congregation for Bishops, Congregation for the Oriental Churches, Congregation for the Evangelization of Peoples, Congregation for the Causes of Saints, Pontifical Council for the Interpretation of Legislative Texts, Pontifical Commission for Latin America, and Pontifical Commission for Vatican City State. He lost these positions on reaching his 80th birthday.

Cacciavillan died at his residence in Vatican City, in the early hours of the morning on 5 March 2022, at the age of 95.

Diplomatic posts
Preceded by Pierluigi Sartorelli	Apostolic Pro-Nuncio to Kenya; 17 January 1976 – 9 May 1981	Succeeded by Giuseppe Ferraioli
Preceded by Luciano Storero	Apostolic Pro-Nuncio to India; 9 May 1981 – 13 June 1990	Succeeded by Giorgio Zur
Preceded by Pio Laghi	Apostolic Pro-Nuncio to the United States; 13 June 1990 – 5 November 1998	Succeeded by Gabriel Montalvo Higuera
Preceded by Pio Laghi	Permanent Observer to the Organization of American States; 13 June 1990 – 5 November 1998	Succeeded by Gabriel Montalvo Higuera
Catholic Church titles
Preceded by Stanislao Amilcare Battistelli	— TITULAR — Titular Archbishop of Amiterno; 17 January 1976 – 21 February 2001	Succeeded by Timothy Paul Andrew Broglio
Preceded by Lorenzo Antonetti	President of the Administration of the Patrimony of the Apostolic See; 5 November 1998 – 1 October 2002	Succeeded by Attilio Nicora
Preceded by Sebastiano Baggio	Cardinal Deacon of Santi Angeli Custodi a Città Giardino; 21 February 2001 – 21 February 2011	Himself as Cardinal Priest
Preceded by Darío Castrillón Hoyos	Cardinal Protodeacon; 1 March 2008 – 21 February 2011	Succeeded by Jean-Louis Tauran
Himself as Cardinal Deacon	Cardinal Priest of Santi Angeli Custodi a Città Giardino; 21 February 2011 – 5 March 2022	Vacant
