= History of the Roman Curia =

The history of the Roman Curia, the administrative apparatus responsible for managing the affairs of the Holy See and the Catholic Church, can be traced to the 11th century when informal methods of administration began to take on a more organized structure and eventually a bureaucratic form. The Curia has undergone a series of renewals and reforms, including a major overhaul following the loss of the Papal States, which fundamentally altered the range and nature of the Curia's responsibilities, removing many of an entirely secular nature.

== Historical origins ==
Like every bishop, the pope was surrounded by a college of priests. The college met regularly to form councils to lead its diocese. Its function also extended a calling to the universal Church, and for matters relating to it, the Pope surrounded himself with other bishops around Rome to hear their advice. Gradually, these consistories took an almost permanent presence: the word "curia" is first used in the Church by a papal document in 1089, during the reign of Pope Urban II. He set up the modern-day Roman Curia in the manner of a royal ecclesiastical court to help run the Church. Meetings were held three times a week under Pope Innocent III.

Outside the presbyteries, which dealt with general topics, the pope set up specialized committees of Cardinals on particular topics. These commissions, first in temporary mandate, became more and more important and stable. Gradually, consistories lost their effectiveness and started to look like meetings apparatus. The real work was done within the congregations.

The first congregation, the Holy Office did not begin its existence as a congregation until 1558, in the reign of Pope Paul IV. Then other congregations were created on this model: one after the Council for the Interpretation of the Decrees of the Council of Trent in 1561, and one for the Index in 1571.

After the Council of Trent, Pope Sixtus V reorganized the administration of the Holy See on 22 January 1588 with the Apostolic Constitution Immensa Aeterni Dei which established as standard practice the organization of groups of cardinal as standing committees to examine or review defined categories problems. Some of these congregations were created to assist in the administration of the Papal States rather than those of the Holy See or the Church.

=== Sixtus V ===
The congregations established by Sixtus V were: the Holy Office, for the Apostolic Signatura, for the erection of churches, for "the abundance of supplies and prosperity of the Church's temporal dominions", for Divine Worship and the Discipline of the Sacraments, for equipping and maintaining the fleet for the defence of the Church's dominions, for an index of forbidden books, for the execution and interpretation of the Council of Trent, for relieving the ills of the States of the Church, for the University of the Rome, for regulating of religious orders, for regulating bishops and other prelates, for taking care of roads, bridges, and waters, for the Vatican printing-press, and for regulating the affairs of the Church's temporal dominions. The Constitution also created the Congregation of Rites, which at that time included jurisdiction over Causes of the Saints.

=== Pius X ===
There was another general reorganization in 1908 under Pope Pius X, which reflected the focus on ecclesiastical matters alone following the loss of the Papal States.

While the Pope was sovereign of that region, the Curia had both religious and civil functions. The latter were lost when the Kingdom of Piedmont-Sardinia, expanding to include the greater part of Italy, seized most of the Papal States in 1860 and the city of Rome itself and its surrounding area in 1870, thus ending the Papacy's temporal power. The Curia was from then on dedicated in practice entirely to the Pope's ecclesiastical responsibilities. When the Holy See concluded the Lateran Pacts with the Italian State in 1929, the Holy See recognized the annexation by Italy of the Papal States, and Vatican City State was created. The Curia has continued to devote itself exclusively to ecclesiastical affairs, and a distinct body, not considered part of the Curia, was established for the governance of the minuscule state.

== Modern era ==
The Second Vatican Council was followed by further changes. Some offices ceased to exist, because their former functions were abolished, as happened with the Dataria. The functions of some others were transferred to another office, as the remaining functions of the Apostolic Chancery and those of the Secretariate of Briefs were transferred to the Secretariat of State, and those of the Congregation of Ceremonies to the Prefecture of the Pontifical Household. Others were split into separate offices, as the Congregation of Rites became the Congregation for the Causes of Saints and the Congregation for Divine Worship, the latter of which later became, by fusion with another office, the Congregation for Divine Worship and the Discipline of the Sacraments. Others again were simply given a new name.

Pope Benedict XVI made only modest changes to the structure of the Roman Curia. In March 2006, he placed both the Pontifical Council for Pastoral Care of Migrants and Itinerant Peoples and the Pontifical Council for Justice and Peace under a single president, Cardinal Renato Martino. When Martino retired in 2009, the Councils each received its own president once again. Also in March 2006 the Pontifical Council for Interreligious Dialogue was briefly merged into the Pontifical Council for Culture under Cardinal Paul Poupard. Those Councils maintained their separate officials and staffs while their status and competencies continued unchanged, and in May 2007 Interreligious Dialogue was restored to its separate status again with its own president. In June 2010 Benedict created the Pontifical Council for the Promotion of the New Evangelisation, appointing Archbishop Rino Fisichella its first president. On 16 January 2013 Pope Benedict transferred responsibility for catechesis from the Congregation for the Clergy to the Pontifical Council for Promoting the New Evangelization.

== See also ==
- Curia (Catholic Church)
- Regarding the History of the Roman Curia:
  - History of the Roman Catholic Church
  - History of the Papacy
  - Timeline of the Roman Catholic Church
  - Role of the Roman Catholic Church in civilization
- Regarding the current state of the Roman Curia:
  - Roman Curia
  - Pope Paul VI's reform of the Roman Curia
