= Attilio Nicora =

Catholic cardinal

His Eminence Attilio Nicora
- President of the Executive Board of the Vatican Financial Information Authority (AIF) and President of the Administration of the Patrimony of the Apostolic See
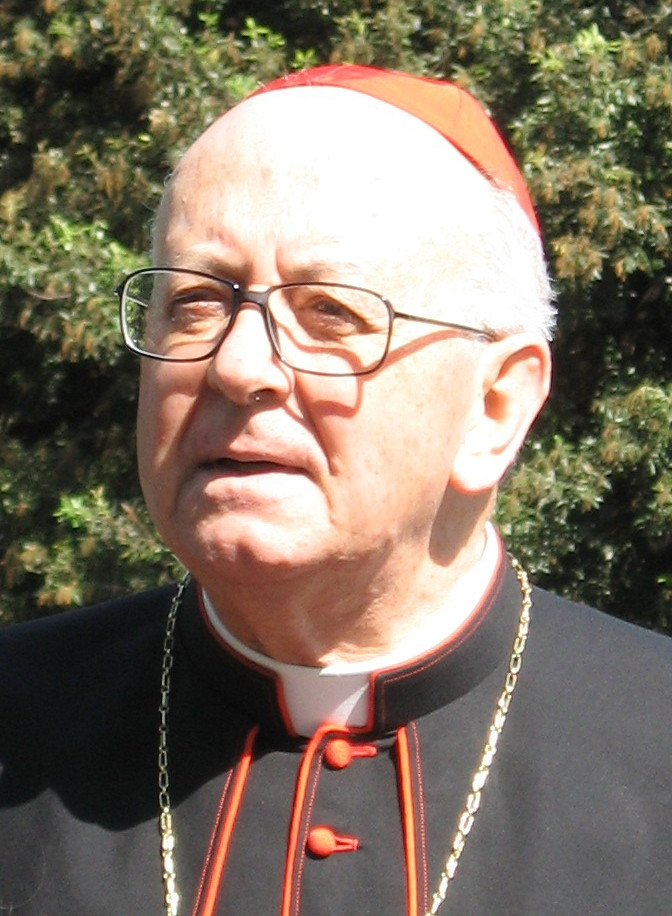
- Appointed: 1 October 2002
- Term ended: 7 July 2011
- Predecessor: Agostino Cacciavillan
- Successor: Domenico Calcagno
- Other post: Cardinal-Priest of San Filippo Neri in Eurosia pro hac vice
- Previous posts: Auxiliary Bishop of Milan (1977–1992); Titular Bishop of Furnos Minor (1977–1992); Bishop of Verona (1992–1997)

Orders
- Ordination: 27 June 1964 by Giovanni Colombo
- Consecration: 28 May 1977 by Giovanni Colombo
- Created cardinal: 21 October 2003 by John Paul II
- Rank: Cardinal-Priest

Personal details
- Born: Attilio Nicora; 16 March 1937 Varese, Italy
- Died: 22 April 2017 (aged 80) Rome, Italy
- Denomination: Roman Catholic
- Coat of arms

Attilio Nicora (16 March 1937 – 22 April 2017) was an Italian prelate of the Catholic Church who held senior positions in the administration of the Roman Curia as president of the Administration of the Patrimony of the Apostolic See from 2002 to 2011 and president of the four-person Executive Board of the Financial Information Authority (FIA) from 2011 to 2014. He was bishop of Verona from 1992 to 1997. He was given the personal title of archbishop in 2002 and was made a cardinal in 2003.

== Biography ==
Nicora was born in Varese, Italy, and ordained a priest in 1964. Prior to being ordained, he had earned a license in Canon law from the Pontifical Gregorian University in Rome as well as a license in theology from the Theological Faculty in Milan. After his ordination, he became a professor of canon law at the Theological Seminary of Venegono Inferiore.

Nicora became a bishop in 1977, when he was appointed auxiliary bishop of Milan and titular bishop of Furnos Minor. Nicora oversaw the 1984 revision of the concordat, between Italy and the Holy See. From 1992 to 1997, he served as bishop of Verona. In 2002, Nicora became President of Administration of the Patrimony of the Apostolic See, where his responsibility was administering the Vatican's income from properties. This position is comparable to that of a chief financial officer in a corporation. Upon the death of a Pope all major Vatican officials automatically lose their positions during a sede vacante, and so Nicora lost his position on 2 April 2005 due to the death of Pope John Paul II but later was confirmed to office by Pope Benedict XVI on 21 April.

Styles of Attilio Nicora
- Reference style: His Eminence
- Spoken style: Your Eminence
- Religious style: Monsignor
- Informal style: Cardinal

Nicora was made cardinal deacon of San Filippo Neri in Eurosia in 2003 by Pope John Paul II. He participated in the papal conclave that elected Pope Benedict XVI in 2005 and again in the conclave that elected Pope Francis in 2013.

On 19 January 2011, Pope Benedict XVI named Nicora the President of the four-person Executive Board of the Vatican's recently established Financial Information Authority (FIA). The agency is charged with monitoring the monetary and commercial activities of Vatican agencies, such as the Governorate of Vatican City State, the Vatican Bank, the Administration of the Patrimony of the Apostolic See, the Congregation for the Evangelization of Peoples, and smaller agencies such as the Vatican Pharmacy, the Vatican Supermarket, and the Vatican Museums. On 30 January 2014, Pope Francis accepted his resignation from that position and named Bishop Giorgio Corbellini to succeed him as Interim President.

Pope Benedict XVI appointed Nicora Pontifical Legate for the Basilicas of St. Francis and St. Mary of the Angels in Assisi. After being a cardinal deacon for ten years, he was promoted to cardinal priest by Pope Francis on 12 June 2014.

Nicora died in a hospital in Rome on 22 April 2017.

Catholic Church titles
Preceded by Lorenzo Antonetti	Pontifical Legate for the Basilicas of Saint Francis and Saint Mary of the Angels in Assisi; 21 February 2006 – 22 April 2017	Succeeded by Agostino Vallini
Preceded by Agostino Cacciavillan	President of the Administration of the Patrimony of the Apostolic See; 1 October 2002 – 7 July 2011	Succeeded by Domenico Calcagno
Government offices
First	President of the Financial Information Authority; 19 January 2011 – 30 January 2014	Succeeded by Giorgio Corbellini
