= Gustavo Giovannoni =

Italian architect and engineer (1873–1947)

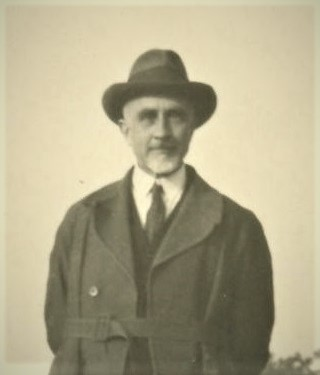
- Born: 1 January 1873; Rome, Kingdom of Italy
- Died: 15 July 1947 (aged 74); Rome, Italy
- Occupation(s): Architect, civil engineer, urban planner

Gustavo Giovannoni (1 January 1873 – 16 July 1947) was an Italian architect, civil engineer and urban planner, active in the first half of the 20th century. He is regarded as Italy's leading theorist of architectural conservation and one of the founders of modern urban planning and restoration culture.

== Life and career ==
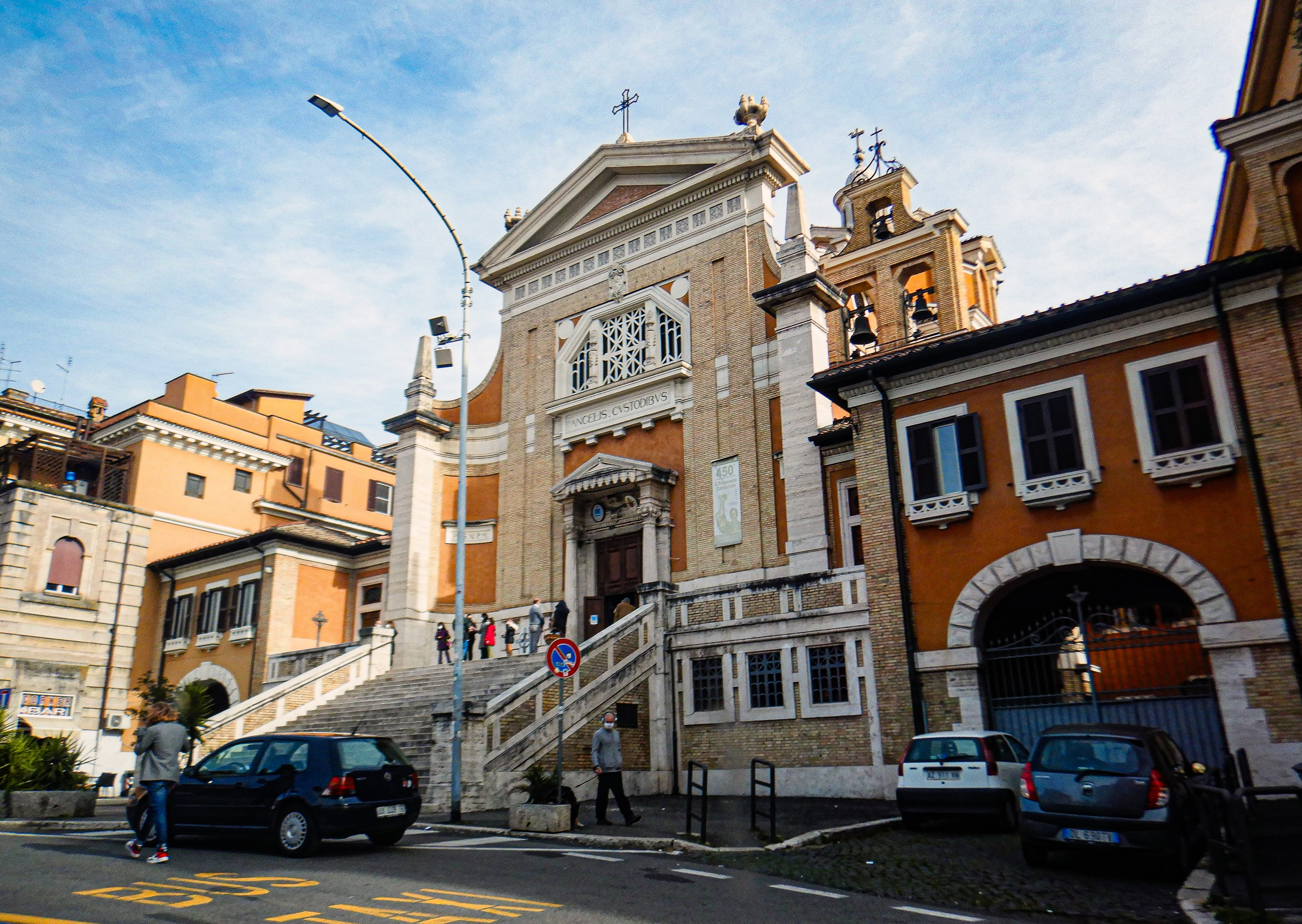
Santi Angeli Custodi a Città Giardino (1925)

Gustavo Giovannoni was born in Rome in 1873. He graduated in engineering in 1895 and earned a diploma in public hygiene in 1896. He soon turned to the history of art under the guidance of Adolfo Venturi, with whom he began reflecting on the relationship between architecture, history, and technique. At the turn of the 19th and 20th centuries, he was actively involved in Roman artistic circles, becoming president of the Associazione artistica tra i cultori di architettura in 1910 and establishing himself as a leading figure among engineers and architects.

Appointed professor of general architecture in 1914 and later of monument restoration, he was among the main promoters of the Scuola Superiore di Architettura in Rome (1920), the first of its kind in Italy, and served as its director from 1927 to 1933. Concurrently, he was a member of the Superior Council of Antiquities and Fine Arts, acting as a consultant for forty years and shaping national policies on preservation and restoration.

As an urban planner and theorist, he developed significant reflections on Rome's master plan and the restoration of historic centers, proposing the theory of diradamento as an alternative to large-scale demolition. His ideas, compiled in Vecchie città ed edilizia nuova (1931), anticipate the modern concept of integrated conservation.

In the 1930s, he promoted new institutions for the study and protection of monuments, including the journal Palladio (1937) and the Centro di Studi di Storia dell'Architettura (1938), which he chaired until 1947. Author of studies on Bramante, Bernini, and Sangallo the Younger, he played a decisive role in establishing the scientific foundations of architectural history and restoration. He was also among the inspirers of Law No. 1497 of 1939 on the protection of natural beauty, which remains fundamental for the preservation of landscape heritage.

== Sources ==
- Ventura, Francesco (1995). Gustavo Giovannoni. Turin: Città Studi.
- Zucconi, Guido (2001). "GIOVANNONI, Gustavo". Dizionario Biografico degli Italiani. Vol. 56. Istituto dell'Enciclopedia Italiana.
