= Clerics Regular Minor =

Roman Catholic religious order

- Ordo Clericorum Regularium Minorum (Latin)
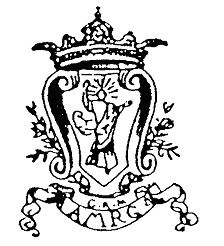
- Emblem of the order showing the Risen Christ with the acronyms of the name and motto.
- Abbreviation: post-nominal letters: CRM
- Founded: 1588; 438 years ago
- Founders: Giovanni Agostino Adorno; Francis Caracciolo
- Founded at: Naples Italy
- Type: Order of Clerics Regular of Pontifical Right (for Men)
- Headquarters: General Motherhouse; Santi Angeli Custodi a Città Giardino: Via Alpi Apuane 1, 00141 Rome, Italy
- Members: 171 (87 priests) as of 2018
- Superior General: Teodoro O. Kalaw
- Website: https://www.crmfathers.org/

The Order of Clerics Regular Minor (Latin: Ordo Clericorum Regularium Minorum), commonly known as the Caracciolini or Adorno Fathers, is a Roman Catholic religious order of priests and brothers founded by Francesco Caracciolo, Giovanni Agostino Adorno, and Fabrizio Caracciolo in 1588 at Villa Santa Maria, Abruzzo. Belonging to the family of Clerics Regular, its members desired to sanctify themselves and the People of God by imitating in their lives the Paschal Mystery of Christ. Its motto is Ad Maiorem Dei Resurgentis Gloriam, "For the Greater Glory of the Risen God". The members of the congregation use the acronym CRM. after their names.

== Founders ==
=== Augustine Adorno ===
Augustine Adorno, born John Augustine Adorno, is considered the first founder and the first father of the Clerics Regular Minor. He was born in Genoa in 1551 to Michele and Nicoletta dei Campanari Adorno. His father's family was very much involved in the political affairs of Genoa. His father was a senator of Genoa and was a respected personage of the city. His mother was a woman of virtue and religious piety.

Adorno received his education in diplomacy, and commerce as well as classical studies. In 1573 his father sent him to the court of Philip II, where he stayed for several years. Adorno was a kind of envoy of Genoa to the King of Spain while at the same time he attended to the financial affairs of the family in Spain. He was a banker in the court of Philip II, lending money to the King and his associates. It was in Valencia, Spain that Adorno met Louis Bertrand who prophesied that he would establish a religious order. Two events could be said to have contributed to Adorno's decision to abandon his career as a banker and financial manager of the family's business: he lost a large amount of money gambling, and the death of his father in 1578. These events led Adorno to the realization of the importance of the 'things in heaven' and that everything on earth soon 'comes to an end.'

Upon his return to Genoa, Adorno had time to reflected on his vocation in life and studied theology and the patrology of the Church Fathers in the seminary of Genoa. It was also in Genoa that Adorno thought of establishing a religious order. At 36 years of age, Adorno was ordained a priest on September 19, 1587, in the Church of Saint Restituta. He continued to exercise his pastoral ministry as a member of the Confraternity of the White Robes of Mercy in Naples, reaching out to the prisoners. Adorno also frequented the Hospital of the Incurabili, where he ministered to the sick and the dying. It was in the course of Adorno's pastoral work in this hospital that he met Fabrizio Caracciolo, a relative of Francis Caracciolo.

Fabbrizio Caracciolo was also noble and rich. After obtaining a law degree and with the prospect of a brilliant career as well as a comfortable life, he chose instead the clerical state and was ordained a priest. Soon he was to join the Compagnia dei Bianchi among whom he distinguished himself for the zeal toward the least, especially the jailed and those condemned to die. When Adorno invited him to join in the foundation of the order, he agreed by renouncing all honors and comforts.

=== Francis Caracciolo ===
Francis Caracciolo was born Ascanio Caracciolo on October 13, 1563, in Villa Santa Maria, Abruzzo, Italy. At twenty-two, Ascanio Caracciolo was a young man enjoying the exceedingly comfortable life available to an Italian nobleman of the sixteenth century, when he contracted a terrible skin disease. Facing death, he vowed that if he recovered he would give the rest of his life to God, and after his miraculous recovery he immediately began studying for the priesthood and was ordained in 1587 at the age of twenty-five. Ascanio's first work was in Naples, with a confraternity that looked after the spiritual welfare of prisoners and those condemned to death.

In 1587, when he mistakenly received a letter addressed to a relative, Fabrizio Caracciolo, the abbot of St. Mary Major in Naples. In it he learned that the writer, a priest call Augustine Adorno, was planning to found an association of priests whose work would combine both active and contemplative life. The project appealed to Ascanio, and he soon joined forces with Augustine Adorno.

The three priests retreated to the Camaldolese hermitage in Naples to write the first Constitutions of the Order. In addition to the three evangelical counsels of chastity, poverty and obedience, they contemplated a fourth vow: the renunciation of any ecclesiastical dignity. They recruited ten companions and began their foundation. On July 1 of the same year Pope Sixtus V approved the new group, and on April 9, 1589, the co-founders made their solemn vows, Ascanio taking the name Francis, the name by which he was subsequently known.

Members of the congregation, called the Clerics Regular Minor, took the usual vows of poverty, chastity, and obedience, plus a fourth: not to seek any ecclesiastical office either within or outside the order. The priests kept perpetual adoration before the Blessed Sacrament and conducted missions, helped the inmates of hospitals and prisons, and established hermitages for those who felt called to a life of contemplation. Francis was elected the order's first general, and although a very self-effacing man accomplished a great deal for it. He made three trips to Spain, where he founded houses in Madrid, Valladolid, and Alcala. He was popular among people as a confessor and preacher, his fervent sermons making him known as "the Preacher of the Love of God."

In 1607 Francis sensed the approach of death and went into retirement to prepare for it. Since most of his adult life head been directed to God, he now had little to do except to await God's call with confidence. His health declined rapidly, and on June 4, 1608, the end came. Those who watched at his bedside that evening heard him murmur, "Let us Go! Let us Go!" When asked where he wanted to go, Francis replied, "To heaven, to heaven!" Scarcely had the Francis uttered these words when the wish was fulfilled. Francis' body was taken to Naples, where it is now venerated.

== History ==
On July 1, 1588 Pope Sixtus V approved the new Order of the Clerics Regular Minor as outlined by Augustine Adorno, Fabrizio Caracciolo and Francis Caracciolo.

Augustine Adorno and Francis Caracciolo made their religious profession in the chapel of the White Servants of Mercy, I Bianchi in Naples on April 9, 1589. A few days later, April 17, 1589, they undertook a journey to Spain with the intent of establishing the order there. They were unsuccessful in establishing the institute, but they made contacts with other religious orders and leaders.

On September 29, 1591, Agostino Adorno died prematurely at the age of 40. Most of the responsibilities and concerns of the new religious family fell upon Francis Caracciolo, who became the first superior general and the focal point of reference for everyone.

Pope Clement VIII in 1592 confirmed the order and officially approves the fourth vow of the order: not to seek ecclesiastical honors. He also assigned, with appropriate documentation, the church of St. Mary Major in Naples to the Order.

At the turn of the century, 1600, Francis Caracciolo was very busy in opening and establishing houses in Spain and in Italy. St. Lawrence in Lucina in Rome, which was to be the General Mother House of the order for more than three centuries, was opened by Francis June 11, 1606.

Francis Caracciolo died on June 4, 1608, at the age of 45 in Agnone on the Vigil of Corpus Christi.

The revised text of the constitutions was presented to the Holy See by the third founder, Fabrizio Caracciolo. It was approved by Pope Paul V with apostolic letter on October 8, 1612.

Fabrizio Caracciolo died on May 25, 1615, at age 60.

In the 18th century, the order was particularly engaged in the process of beatification and canonization of Francis Caracciolo. The final proclamation of Francis as a saint was made by Pope Pius VII on May 24, 1807. By the end of this century, the order has grown to five Provinces (three in Italy and two in Spain) and has about 50 communities with a total membership between 700 and 800 religious. The order is involved in parish work, teaching in colleges and universities. It has consultors in various congregations of the Holy See, and some religious are given special and delicate assignments, such as that of Father Ceru' and Father Soffietti who are sent to the Far East to investigate and report on the difficult controversy of the Rites.

In the early 19th century there were great upheavals, which would deal a serious blow to all religious orders and to the Order of Clerics Regular Minor in particular. The French Revolution, the suppression of religious orders, the nationalistic spirit of the times, and other factor contributed to the general disarray and deterioration. Many houses were suppressed, a number of religious were secularized and entire provinces disappeared.

At the beginning of the 20th century, the order has been reduced to a handful of religious houses and members. There were doubts as to the future of the institute. But with the encouragement of the popes, especially Pope Benedict XV, the order started to show new signs of life. Gradually, the order expanded again, in Italy first, then in the United States, Germany and Africa.

Following an invitation of Archbishop Thomas J. Walsh, Michael De Angelis came to America in 1930. He resided for some time in Morristown, New Jersey, as a chaplain of the Religious Teachers Filippini, otherwise known as the Filippini Sisters. After a few years, Archbishop Walsh assigned Angelis as pastor of St. Joseph's Church in Lodi, New Jersey.

On April 1, 1962, a house of studies was opened in Ramsey, New Jersey. Later, the Adorno Center was built to prepare candidates for the priesthood and the religious life. Five priests have studied and been ordained from there.

In 1989, after the ordination of two American priests, the order saw the need to expand. Contacts were made with various dioceses, and the order accepted an offer from the Bishop of Charleston, Ernest L. Unterkoefler, to open a new apostolic work at Immaculate Conception Parish, Goose Creek, South Carolina.

The first missionary foundation of the Adorno Fathers was on February 19, 1984, in the Democratic Republic of Congo (Ex Zaire) with Parochial Ministry in Binja in Nyamilima followed by the opening of the Seminary of St. Joseph in Goma. Adorno Ashram in Mallikassery started on 1993 in Kerala followed by the seminary in Bangalore, Karnataka and seminary in Kiliyanthara in Kerala.

March 1, 2002, marked the official beginning of the Adorno Fathers' presence in the Philippines. Following an invitation by Bishop Benjamin J. Almoneda, a group of Adorno priests went to the Diocese of Daet with the understanding of using the academic diocesan facilities of Holy Trinity College Seminary. The first group of students together with the Adorno priests took up residence temporarily on the campus of Holy Trinity, while the House of Formation was being built in Vinzons, Camarines Norte. Today the seminary is in full operation.

== Locations ==
=== Countries where the order is present ===
- Italy – motherhouse in Rome
- The United States
- Germany
- Democratic Republic of the Congo
- Philippines
- India
- Kenya
- Tanzania

=== U.S. states and commonwealths where the order is present ===
- New Jersey

North Carolina

- South Carolina
- Northern Mariana Islands
