= Henchir-El-Msaadine =

Roman ruins in Tunisia

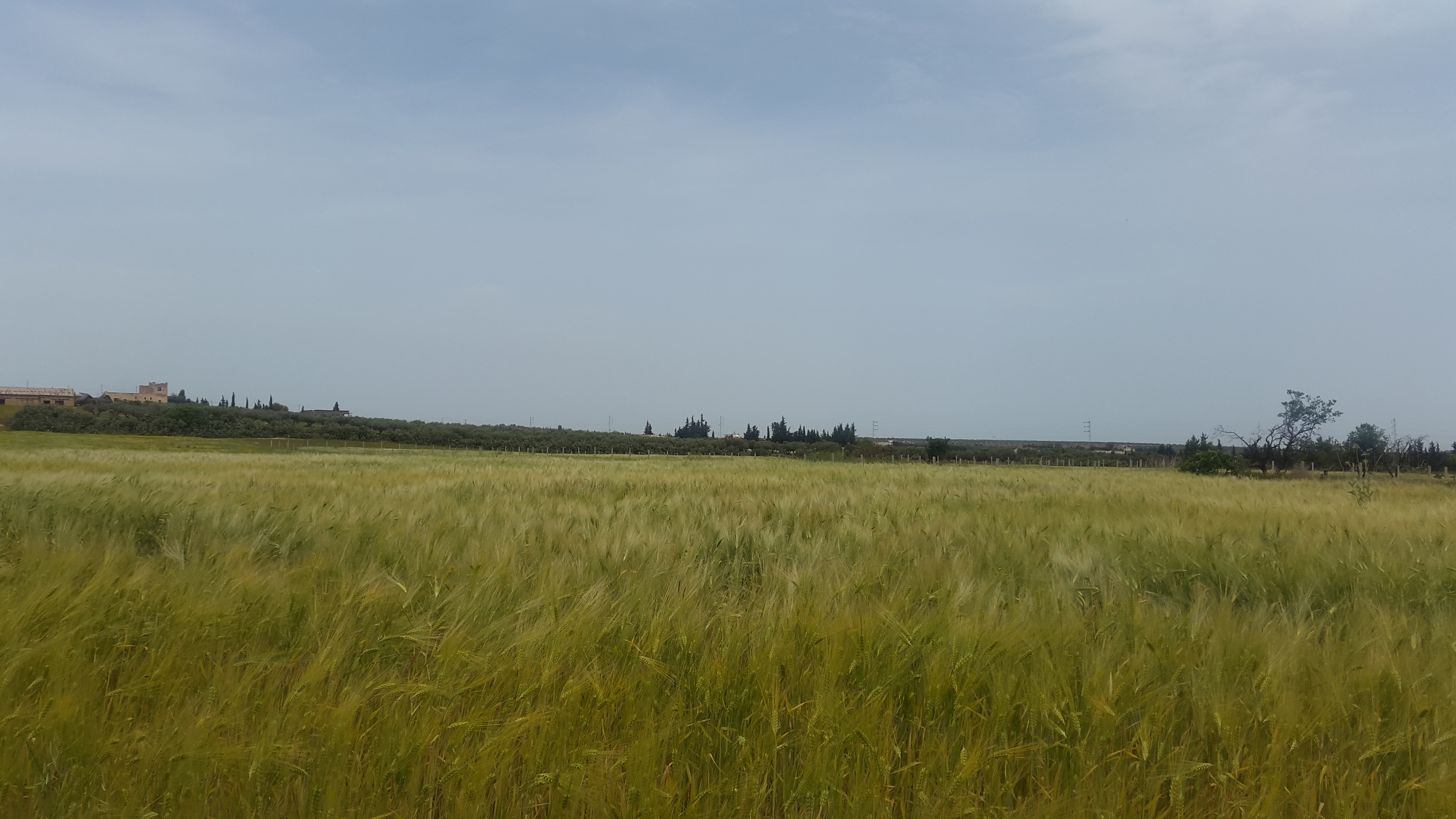
Site of Furnos Minus today

Henchir-El-Msaadine is a Roman Empire era set of ruins near Tebourba(Ancient Thuburbo Minus) in modern Tunisia, North Africa. The site is outside of Tunis. The ruins are tentatively identified as the remains of Municipium Aurelium Antoninianum Furnitanorum also known as Furnos Minor, a city of Africa Proconsularis. Furnos Minus had the rank of a Municipium (city) of Africa Proconsularis and has been identified through Epigraphic remains

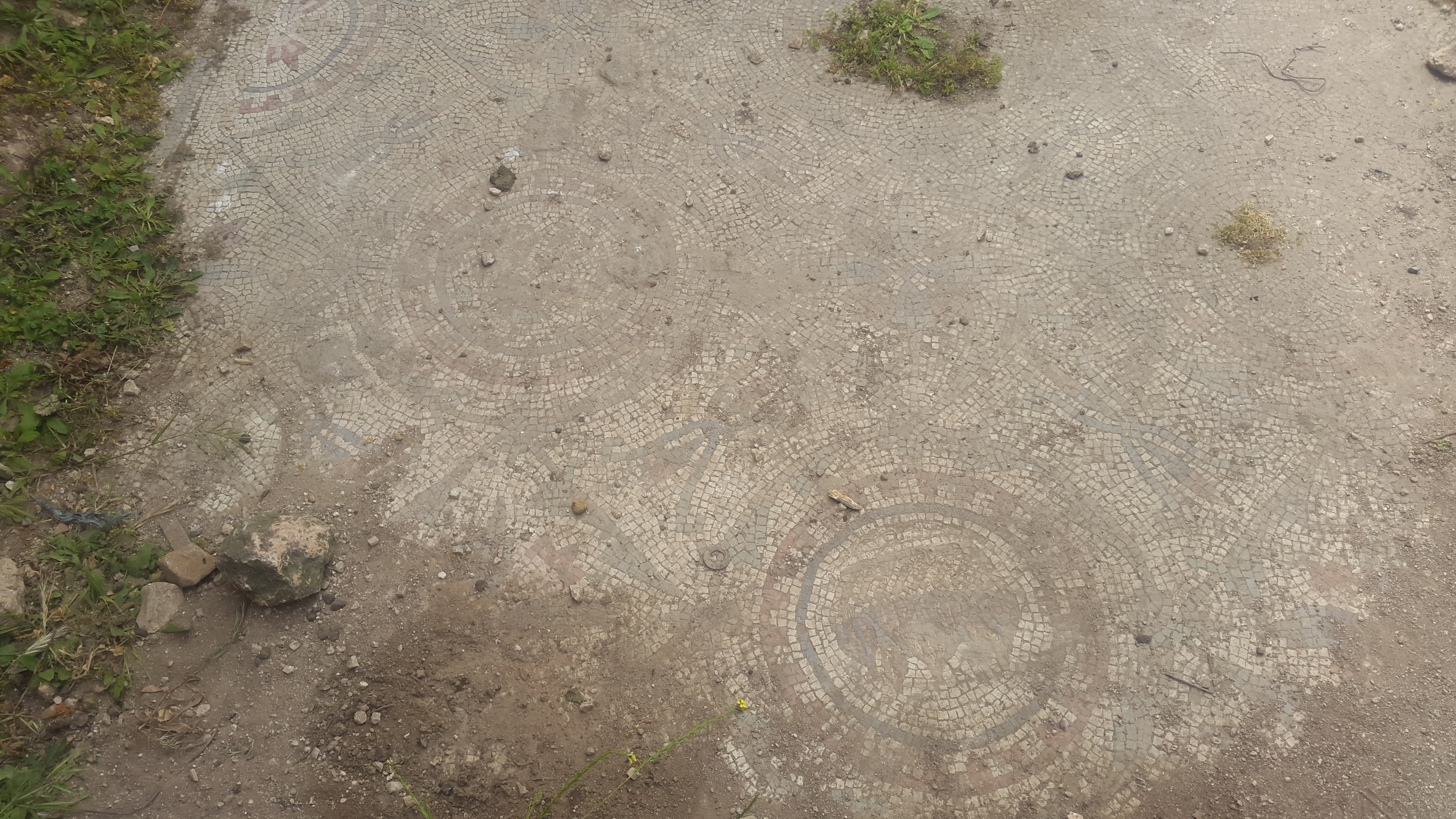
remains of mosaics at Henchir El Msaadine.

The remains of a basilica have been found there, and a bishopric was known to be based in the city. The town and its Bishopric disappeared after the Muslim conquest of the Maghreb, but the diocese was revived, in name at least, as a titular see of the Roman Catholic Church during the 20th century.

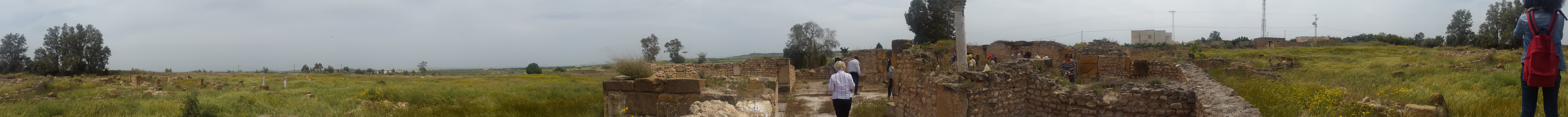
remains of Henchir El Msaadine
