= Aquilino Bocos Merino =

Spanish prelate

His Eminence Aquilino Bocos Merino C.M.F.
- Cardinal-Deacon of Santa Lucia del Gonfalone
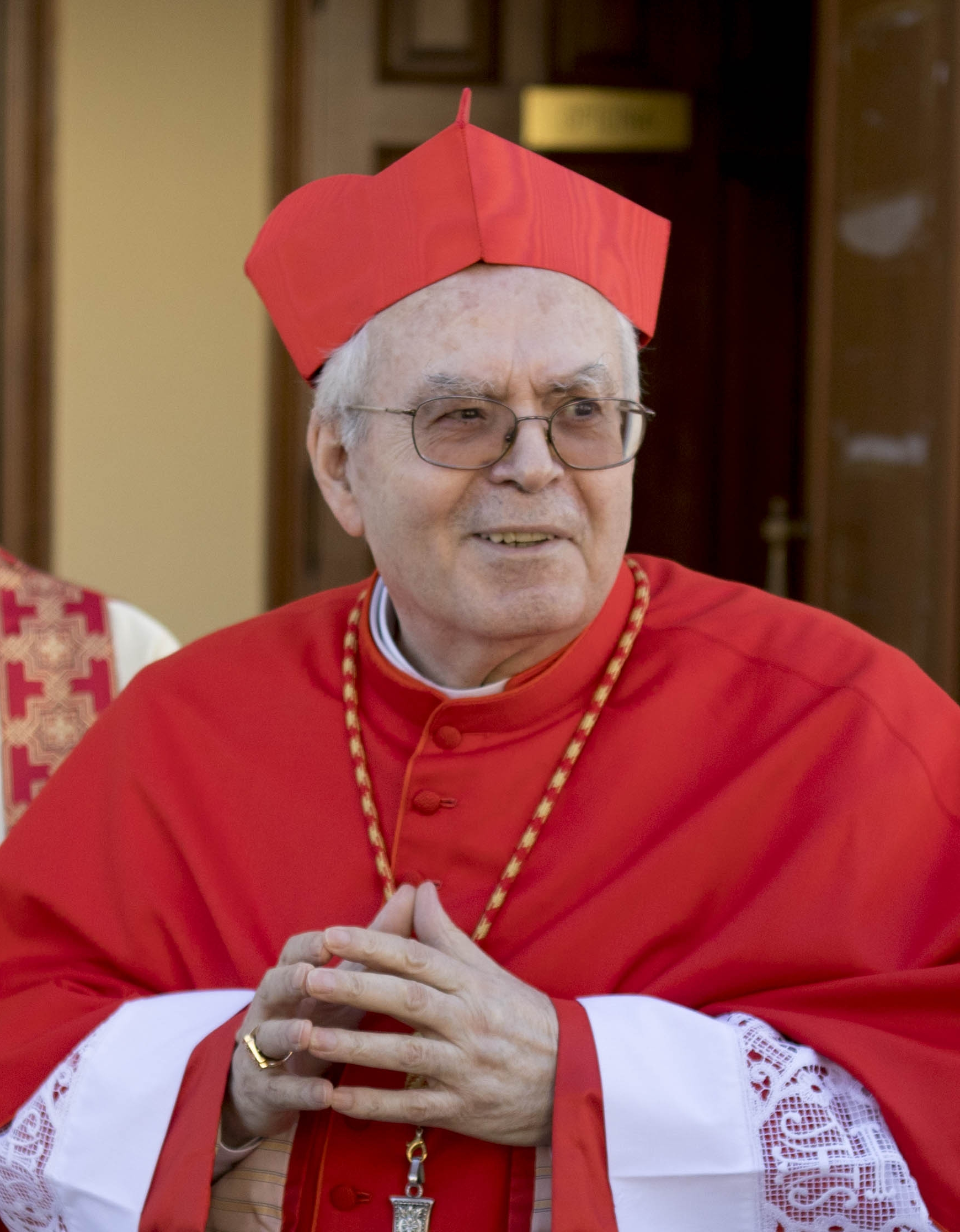
- The cardinal in 2019.
- Church: Roman Catholic Church
- Appointed: 28 June 2018
- Installed: 26 January 2019
- Predecessor: Francesco Marchisano
- Previous posts: Superior-General of the Claretians (1991–2003); Titular Archbishop of Urusi (2018)

Orders
- Ordination: 23 May 1963 by Francisco Barbado Viejo
- Consecration: 16 June 2018 by Fernando Sebastián Aguilar
- Created cardinal: 28 June 2018 by Pope Francis
- Rank: Cardinal-Deacon

Personal details
- Born: Aquilino Bocos Merino; 17 May 1938 (age 88) Canillas de Esgueva, Valladolid, Spain
- Education: Pontifical University of Salamanca
- Motto: Ut vitam habeant
- Coat of arms

Aquilino Bocos Merino, C.M.F. (Spanish pronunciation: [akiˈlino ˈβokos meˈɾino]; born 17 May 1938) is a Spanish prelate of the Catholic Church, a member and official of the Claretians. He was Superior General of the order, properly known as the Congregation of Missionaries, Sons of the Immaculate Heart of the Blessed Virgin Mary, from 1991 to 2003. Pope Francis made him a cardinal on 28 June 2018.

== Biography ==
He was born in Canillas de Esgueva, Valladolid, Spain, on 17 May 1938. He attended the seminary of the Missionary Claretians and was ordained a priest in 1963.

He earned a degree in philosophy at the Pontifical University of Salamanca. From 1980 to 1991 he was general counsel of the Claretians. In 1991 he was elected the order's Superior General and served two six-year terms.

In 1994 he participated in the Synod of Bishops on the consecrated life, and he was a member of the Congregation for Institutes of Consecrated Life and Societies of Apostolic Life from 1994 to 2004.

On 20 May 2018, Pope Francis announced he would make him a cardinal on 28 June. He was consecrated as the Titular Archbishop of Urusi in Madrid on 16 June by Cardinal Fernando Sebastián Aguilar with Cardinals Carlos Osoro Sierra and Ricardo Blázquez as co-consecrators. At the 28 June consistory, he was assigned the diaconate church of Santa Lucia del Gonfalone.

== See also ==
- Cardinals created by Francis

Catholic Church titles
Preceded by Gustavo Alonso	Superior General of the Claretians; 1991 – 2003	Succeeded by Josep María Abella Batlle
Preceded by Jose Elmer Mangalinao	Titular Archbishop of Urusi; 11 June 2018 – 28 June 2018	Vacant
Preceded by Francesco Marchisano	Cardinal-Deacon of Santa Lucia del Gonfalone; 28 June 2018 –	Incumbent
