= Giovanni De Andrea =

Italian Roman Catholic archbishop

The Most Reverend Giovanni De Andrea
- Titular Archbishop of Aquaviva
- Church: Roman Catholic Church
- In office: 1975-2012
- Other posts: Vice President Emeritus of the Labour Office of the Apostolic See; Grand Prior of the Lieutenancy for Central Italy and Sardinia of the Order of the Holy Sepulchre of Jerusalem
- Previous posts: Vice President of Labour Office of the Apostolic See (1989-2007); President of Vatican Publishing House (1993 – 2003); Apostolic Delegate to Libya (1986-1989); Apostolic Pro-Nuncio to Tunisia (1986-1989); Apostolic Pro-Nuncio to Algeria (1986-1989); Apostolic Pro-Nuncio to Iran (1983-1986); Apostolic Delegate to Angola (1975-1983)

Orders
- Ordination: 29 June 1951
- Consecration: 11 May 1975 by Jean-Marie Villot

Personal details
- Born: 22 April 1928 Rivarolo Canavese, Italy
- Died: 19 January 2012 (aged 83) Rome, Italy

Giovanni De Andrea (22 April 1928 – 19 January 2012) was an Italian Roman Catholic titular archbishop and diplomat.

== Education ==
Ordained to the priesthood on June 29, 1951. From 1956 to 1958 he studied at the Pontifical Ecclesiastical Academy, then he entered the diplomatic service of the Holy See.

== Career ==
De Andrea was named titular archbishop of Aquaviva on April 14, 1975. He served as apostolic delegate to Angola and Libya and apostolic pro-nuncio to Iran, Algeria, and Tunisia.

In 1989, he was appointed vice-president of the Labour Office of the Apostolic See retiring in 2007.

Between 1993 and 2003, he served as President of the Vatican Publishing House.

For many years he was a Grand Prior of the Lieutenancy for Central Italy and Sardinia of the Order of the Holy Sepulchre.

== Family ==
His younger brother Giuseppe de Andrea was also a priest. On September 20, 2001, he conferred the Episcopal Consecration to him as an Archbishop of the Titular See of Anzio.

== Death ==
He died in Rome at the age of 83. Cardinal Angelo Sodano presided at his funeral rites at the altar of the Cathedra in St. Peter's Basilica.

Catholic Church titles
Preceded by Luigi Rovigatti	Titular Archbishop of Aquaviva; 1975–2012	Succeeded by Fortunatus Nwachukwu
