= Santa Lucia del Gonfalone =

- Church of Saint Lucy of the Standard-Bearer
- Chiesa Santa Lucia del Gonfalone
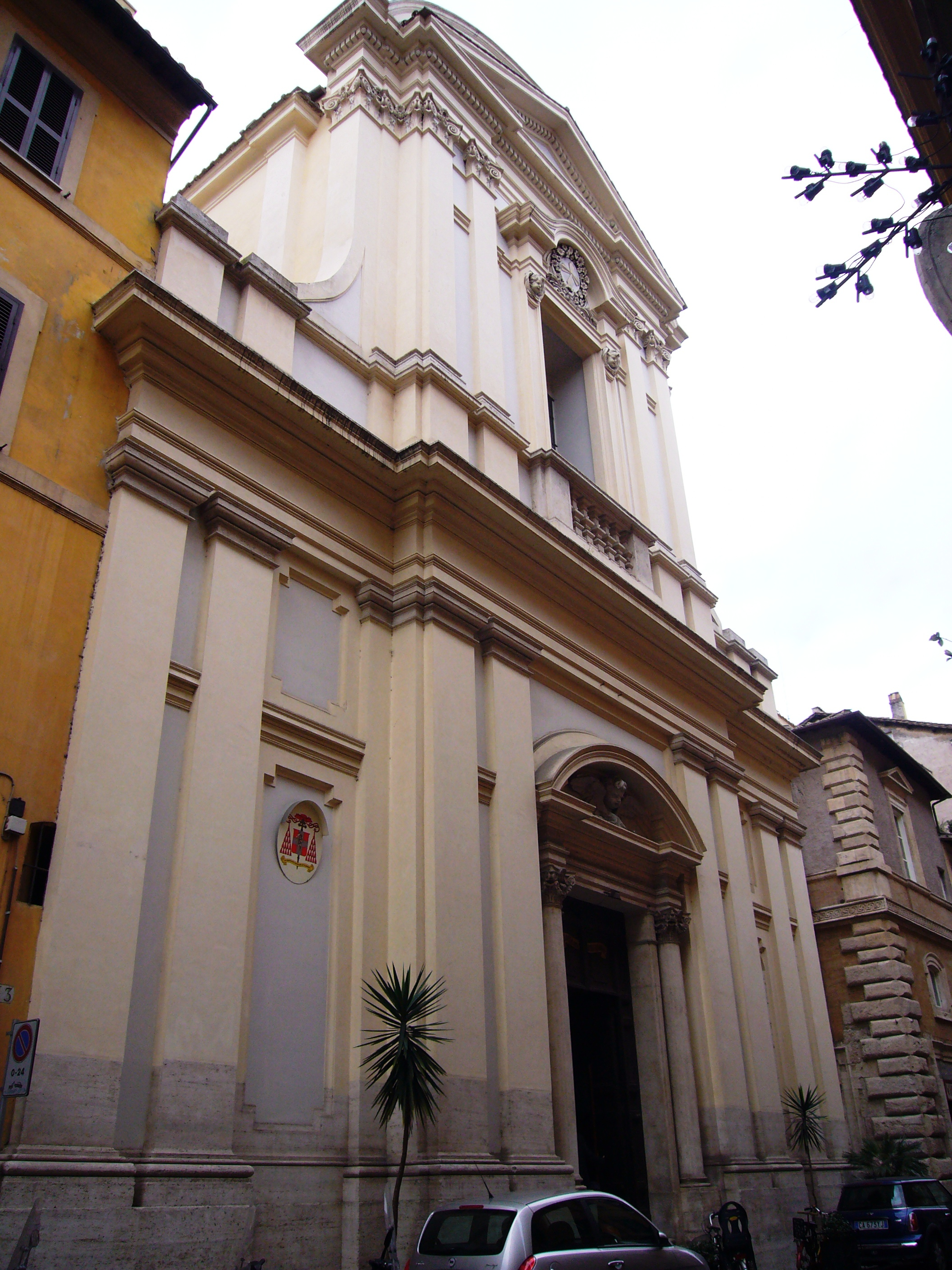
- Façade of Santa Lucia del Gonfalone, with the coat of arms of Cardinal Marchisano on the left
- Click on the map for a fullscreen view
- 41.897639°N 12.467333°E
- Location: Via dei Banchi Vecchi 12, Rome
- Country: Italy
- Language: Italian
- Denomination: Catholic
- Tradition: Roman Rite
- Religious institute: Claretians
- Website: santaluciagonfalone.it

History
- Status: titular church
- Founded: 1511
- Dedication: Saint Lucy

Architecture
- Architect: Marco David
- Architectural type: Baroque

Administration
- Diocese: Rome

Santa Lucia del Gonfalone is a church in the diocese of Rome, Italy, located on Via dei Banchi Vecchi just one block south of Corso Vittorio Emanuele. The former site of the Archconfraternity of the Gonfalone, the Claretian Missionaries have their provincial headquarters here. The church was made a cardinalate deaconry by Pope John Paul II on 21 October 2003.

== Architecture ==
The original church dates back to the end of the 13th century or the beginning of the 14th century under the name Santa Lucia ai Banchi Vecchi. It later became known as Santa Lucia Nuovo to distinguish it from Santa Lucia Vecchia, near the Tiber. The Archconfraternity undertook restoration of the church in 1511. The old church was demolished and rebuilt by architect Marco David in 1764.

=== Interior ===
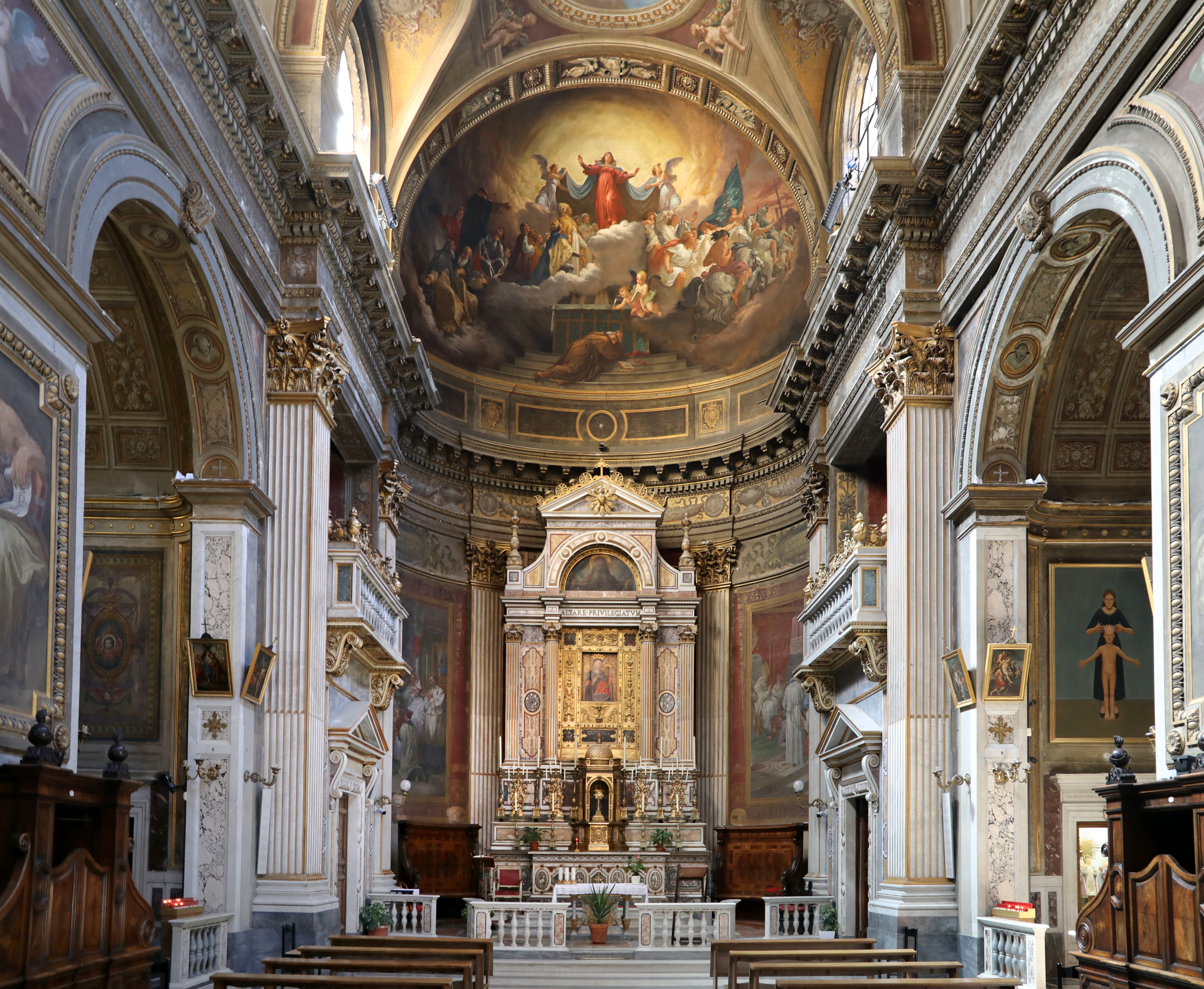
Interior.

In 1866, Francesco Azzurri designed a barrel vault and expanded the number of surrounding chapels. Cesare Mariani painted three frescoes: The Vision of St Bonaventure, Pope Sixtus V blesses the Redeemed Barbary Slaves, and The oath of Giovanni Cerrone, prefect of Rome. Mariani's work on the six side chapels depict the liberation of oppressed people and other works of charity, areas in which the Archconfraternity focused its activities. The sacristy contains a work by Ermenegildo Costantini.

== Archconfraternity of the Gonfalone ==
The Archconfraternity of the Gonfalone was a group of white penitents (due to the colour of their robe) that were headquartered in the church. The association was established in 1264 at Rome. St. Bonaventure, at that time Inquisitor-general of the Holy Office, prescribed the rules, and the white habit. It came to be called the Gonfalone Confraternity because of the banner or gonfalon carried in processions.

The confraternity was erected in the Church of St. Mary Major by Pope Clement IV in 1265 under the name La Confraternita dei "Raccomandati della Madonna S. Maria". Pope Clement IV officially recognized the Company, with the "Brief" of 1267.

In 1486, the confraternity moved from S. Lucia Vecchia, in Regola, which being close to the Tiber was subject to flooding. Many privileges and churches were granted to this confraternity by succeeding pontiffs. In 1526 the confraternity was awarded a Golden Rose by Pope Clement VII. In 1550 Pope Julius III granted the confraternity the prerogative to pardon one convict annually.

The Confraternita della Madonna del San Francesco in Foligno affiliated with the Gonfalone in 1575 and adopted the name.

In 1579, the Confraternity subsumed a number of other confraternities that had been erected in Santa Maria in Aracoeli such as the "Raccomandati" of the church and hospital of the Santi Quaranta Martiri, in Trastevere, and the "Disciplinati" of the Church and Hospital of the Maddalena al Pantheon. Pope Gregory XIII raised it to the rank of an archconfraternity, to which the rest were aggregated. By that time the Confraternity could afford to provide dowries for 100 single women.

He tasked the new Archconfraternity with freeing slaves under Islamic rule, much like the Order of Trinitarians and the Mercedarians, especially captives from the Papal States. The pope also gave the Archconfraternity the power to free two convicts each year. The obligations of the members were to care for the sick, bury the dead, provide medical service for those unable to afford it, and give dowries to poor girls. What distinguished these White Penitents from those other confraternities was the circle on the shoulder of the habit, within a cross of red and white.

In 1890, the fraternity was dissolved. In 1905 the church, along with a small convent, was then sold to the Congregation of Missionary Sons of the Immaculate Heart of the Blessed Virgin Mary. The Claretians have made the convent the provincial seat of the congregation.

== List of Cardinal Protectors ==
The church was made a cardinalate deaconry by Pope John Paul II on 21 October 2003.

- Francesco Marchisano (2003 – 2014)
- Aquilino Bocos Merino (2018 - )
