= Giorgio Corbellini =

Italian Roman Catholic prelate (1947–2019)

The Most Reverend Giorgio Corbellini
- President of the Labour Office of the Apostolic See
- Church: Roman Catholic Church
- Appointed: 3 July 2009
- Quashed: 13 November 2019
- Predecessor: Francesco Marchisano
- Other posts: Titular Bishop of Abula (2009–2019); President of the Disciplinary Commission of the Roman Curia (2010–2019)
- Previous posts: President of the Personnel Commission of the Governatorate of the Vatican State (2001–11); Vice Secretary-General of the Governorate of the Vatican State (2001–11); President ad interim of the Financial Information Authority (2014)

Orders
- Ordination: 10 July 1971 by Enrico Manfredini
- Consecration: 12 September 2009 by Pope Benedict XVI

Personal details
- Born: Giorgio Corbellini; 20 April 1947 Travo, Piacenza, Italy
- Died: November 13, 2019 (aged 72) Parma, Italy
- Education: Pontifical Lateran University
- Motto: Servi inutiles sumus
- Coat of arms: Giorgio Corbellini's coat of arms

Styles of Giorgio Corbellini
- Reference style: The Most Reverend
- Spoken style: Your Excellency
- Religious style: Monsignor
- Posthumous style: none

Ordination history of Giorgio Corbellini
History
Episcopal consecration
- Consecrated by: Pope Benedict XVI

Giorgio Corbellini (20 April 1947 – 13 November 2019) was an Italian Roman Catholic prelate, who was the president of the Labour Office of the Apostolic See since his appointment by Pope Benedict XVI on 3 July 2009 until his death. In this position he managed relations with lay workers in the Roman Curia. He previously served as Vice Secretary-General of the Governorate of the Vatican City State.

He entered the seminary in 1958 in Piacenza, where he attended junior high and high school. From 1966 to 1972 he completed the course of philosophy and theology. He was ordained on 10 July 1971 and was incardinated in the diocese of Piacenza. After his ordination he was a pastor and taught religion in schools.

From 1981 to 1985 he completed his university studies in canon law at the Pontifical Lateran University, graduating summa cum laude in utroque iure. He attended the courses in 1982-1985 for acquiring the title of lawyer Rota.

From 1981 to 1984 and then from 1985 he worked in the pastoral activities of the parish of Saint Lucia in Rome. Beginning in September 1993 he was also chaplain of the Ursuline Sisters in Rome, the Daughters of Mary Immaculate of Verona. On 1 October 1985 he entered the service of the Holy See as an officer of the secretary of the Pontifical Commission for the Authentic Interpretation of the Code of Canon Law, now the Pontifical Council for Legislative Texts. Beginning on 1 September 1992, he served as Head of Legal Department of the Governorate of Vatican City.

In April 1993, he became Deputy Secretary-General of the Governorate. From February 2005 to February 2006 he was also Acting Director of Economic Services of the Governorate.

He worked in Rome until he was appointed Titular Bishop of Abula and president of the Labour Office of the Apostolic See, replacing Cardinal Francesco Marchisano. Bishop Corbellini also took over Cardinal Marchisano's role as president of the Permanent Commission for the Protection of Historical and Artistic Monuments of the Holy See. He was consecrated as Titular Bishop of Abula on 12 September by Pope Benedict XVI with Cardinals Tarcisio Bertone and William Levada as co-consecrators.

In addition to his duties at the Labour Office, on 11 May 2010 he was appointed president of the Disciplinary Commission of the Roman Curia replacing Cardinal Julián Herranz Casado.

Catholic Church titles
Preceded by Julián Cardinal Herranz Casado	President of the Disciplinary Commission of the Roman Curia; 11 May 2010 – 2019	Vacant
Government offices
Preceded by Francesco Cardinal Marchisano	President of the Labour Office of the Apostolic See; 3 July 2009 – 2019	Vacant
Preceded by Attilio Cardinal Nicora	President ad interim of the Financial Information Authority; 30 January 2014 – 19 November 2014	Succeeded by René Brülhart
