= Francesco Marchisano =

Italian Cardinal

His Eminence Francesco Marchisano
- Cardinal-Priest of Santa Lucia del Gonfalone
- Church: Roman Catholic Church
- Appointed: 21 October 2003
- Term ended: 27 July 2014
- Predecessor: None; diaconate created
- Successor: Aquilino Bocos Merino
- Previous posts: President of the Pontifical Commission for Sacred Archeology (1991–2004); President of the Pontifical Commission for the Cultural Heritage of the Church (1993–2003); President of the Artistic-Cultural Commission of the Grand Jubilee Year (2000); Vicar General for the Vatican City State (2002–2005); Archpriest of St. Peter's Basilica (2002–2006); President of the Fabric of St. Peter (2002–2004); President of the Labour Office of the Apostolic See (2005–2009)

Orders
- Ordination: 29 June 1952 by Maurilio Fossati
- Consecration: 6 January 1989 by Pope John Paul II
- Created cardinal: 21 October 2003 by Pope John Paul II
- Rank: Cardinal-Priest

Personal details
- Born: Francesco Marchisano; 25 June 1929 Racconigi, Italy
- Died: 27 July 2014 (aged 85) Rome, Italy
- Denomination: Roman Catholic
- Motto: In caritate radicati et fundati ("Rooted and grounded in love")
- Coat of arms

Francesco Marchisano (25 June 1929 – 27 July 2014) was an Italian Cardinal who worked in the Roman Curia from 1956 until his death.

== Biography ==
Born in Racconigi, he was ordained a priest in Turin by Cardinal Maurilio Fossati in 1952.

He studied in Rome where he was offered his first Curial appointment by Cardinal Giuseppe Pizzardo. Rising through the Vatican dicastery (then the Sacred Congregation for Seminaries and Universities, now the Congregation for Catholic Education), he served as its Undersecretary from 1969 to 1988. He was also advanced to monsignor, becoming a Papal Chamberlain in 1961 and a Prelate of Honour in 1971.

On 6 October 1988, Pope John Paul II named him titular bishop of Populonia and consecrated him on 6 January 1989. He later served as president and Secretary of various Vatican organs. He was raised to archbishop on 9 July 1994.

His positions included:

- President of the Pontifical Commission for Sacred Archeology (1991–2004)
- President of the Pontifical Commission for the Cultural Heritage of the Church (1993–2002)
- President of the Artistic-Cultural Commission of the Grand Jubilee Year 2000

Styles of Francesco Marchisano
- Reference style: His Eminence
- Spoken style: Your Eminence
- Religious style: Monsignor
- Informal style: Cardinal
- See: Populonia (titular see)

On 24 April 2002 he was named to succeed Cardinal Virgilio Noè as Archpriest of the Patriarchal Vatican Basilica, Vicar General for Vatican City, and President of the Fabric of Saint Peter. At the next consistory in 2003 he was made Cardinal-Deacon of Santa Lucia del Gonfalone. He was later named President of the Permanent Commission for the Care of the Historical and Artistic Monuments of the Holy See, serving from 8 March 2003 to 3 July 2009.

He passed the normal retirement age of 75 for Curial positions in 2004, though this is frequently waived. After the death of Cardinal Jan Pieter Schotte, Cardinal Marchisano was named on 5 February 2005 to succeed him as President of the Labour Office of the Apostolic See, retaining his other positions, while Archbishop Angelo Comastri was named to the unusual position of Coadjutor Archpriest of Saint Peter's and as Marchisano's successor Vicar General for the State of Vatican City, and President of the Fabric of Saint Peter.

Cardinal Marchisano was one of the cardinal electors who participated in the 2005 papal conclave that selected Pope Benedict XVI. In a funeral Mass for Pope John Paul II celebrated the day after his funeral, Cardinal Marchisano revealed that he had been cured of an illness of the throat after the late pope had prayed and touched him.

On 31 October 2006, Pope Benedict named Angelo Comastri to succeed Cardinal Marchisano as Archpriest of St Peter's Basilica. On 3 July 2009, Marchisano resigned as president of the Labour Office of the Apostolic See and as president of the Permanent Commission for the Custody of Historical and Artistic Monuments of the Holy See.

Following the conclave that elected Pope Francis, Marchisano was one of the six cardinals who made the public act of obedience to the new pope on behalf of the College of Cardinals at the papal inauguration ceremony. Having served 10 years as a cardinal-deacon, he was promoted to cardinal-priest by Pope Francis on 12 June 2014.

Marchisano died in Rome on 27 July 2014 at the age of 85. At the 28 June 2018 consistory, Pope Francis assigned the diaconate church of Santa Lucia del Gonfalone which Marchisano previously held to Aquilino Bocos Merino.

Catholic Church titles
Preceded by Antonio Innocenti	President of the Pontifical Commission for the Cultural Heritage of the Church; 4 May 1993 – 13 October 2003	Succeeded by Mauro Piacenza
Preceded by Virgilio Noè	Vicar General of His Holiness for Vatican City; 24 April 2002 – 5 February 2005	Succeeded by Angelo Comastri
Preceded by Virgilio Noè	Archpriest of St. Peter's Basilica; 24 April 2002 – 31 October 2006	Succeeded by Angelo Comastri
Preceded by Virgilio Noè	President of the Fabric of Saint Peter; 24 April 2002 – 28 August 2004	Succeeded by Angelo Comastri
Preceded by Jan Pieter Schotte	President of the Labour Office of the Apostolic See; 5 February 2005 – 3 July 2009	Succeeded by Giorgio Corbellini
