= Disciplinary Commission of the Roman Curia =

Principal disciplinary commission of Roman Curia

The Disciplinary Commission of the Roman Curia is the principal disciplinary body within the Roman Curia. Until 2010 the president of the Pontifical Council for Legislative Texts headed the office.

== Presidents of the Disciplinary Commission of the Roman Curia ==
- Rosalio Castillo Lara, SDB (5 October 1981 – 1990)
- Vincenzo Fagiolo (29 December 1990 – 1997)
- Mario Francesco Pompedda (1997 – 16 November 1999)
- Julián Herranz Casado (3 December 1999 – 11 May 2010)
- Giorgio Corbellini (11 May 2010 – 13 November 2019)
- Vincenzo Buonomo (since 8 January 2021)
