= Urusi =

Titular see in Tunisia

Urusi was a civitas and ancient episcopal see of the Roman province of Africa Proconsularis in present-day Tunisia.

The town flourished from 30BC until 640AD and has been tentatively identified with ruins at Henchir Soudga, (35.98709°N 9.57727°E) in Siliana Governorate. The ruins lie just outside the Jebel Serj National Park.

== Bishopric ==
The town was made famous by the courage of the martyr Mansuetus of Urusi, who was burned alive, according to Victor of Vita at the gate of Urusi. In 305, during the same persecution the basilicas of Lemsa, Zama and Furni, Tunisia had been burned.

The diocese was established in 1933 as a titular see.

=== Leadership ===
Known bishops

- Mansuetus, bishop of Urusi
- Quintianus of Urusi fl.484

Titular bishops and archbishops

- William Thomas Porter, 1933–1950
- Teófilo José Pereira de Andrade, 1951–1954
- Peter Bernard Pereira 1955–1966
- Dante Frasnelli Tarter, 1967–1977
- Celso José Pinto da Silva 1978–1981
- José Carlos Castanho de Almeida 1982–1987
- Luca Brandolini, 1987–1993
- Jesús Esteban Catalá Ibáñez 1996–1999
- José María Libório Camino Saracho 1999–2002
- Buenaventura Malayo Famadico 2002–2003
- Julian Charles Porteous 2003–2013
- Jose Elmer Imas Mangalinao 2016-2018
- Aquilino Bocos Merino, C.M.F. 2018
- Luis Cabrera Herrera 2024–
