= Canillas de Esgueva =

Coordinates: 41°45′N 4°07′W

Canillas de Esgueva, Spain
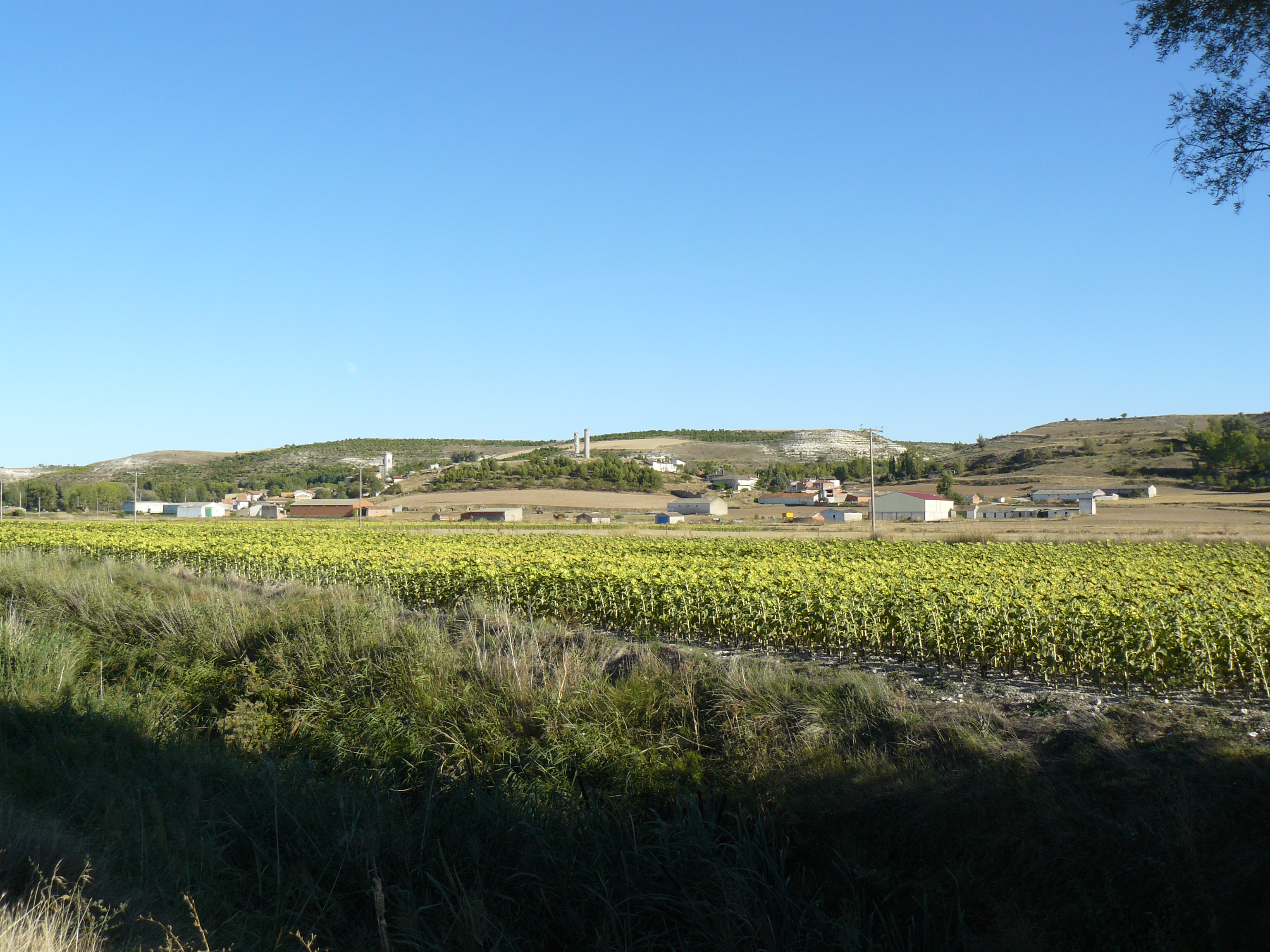
- panoramic view
- Country: Spain
- Autonomous community: Castile and León
- Province: Valladolid
- Municipality: Canillas de Esgueva

Area
  - Total: 23 km^{2} (8.9 sq mi)

Population (2025-01-01)
  - Total: 71
  - Density: 3.1/km^{2} (8.0/sq mi)
- Time zone: UTC+1 (CET)
  - Summer (DST): UTC+2 (CEST)

Canillas de Esgueva is a municipality located in the province of Valladolid, Castile and León, Spain. According to the 2004 census (INE), the municipality has a population of 113 inhabitants.

== Notable people ==
- Aquilino Bocos (born 1938), cardinal of the Catholic Church
