= Labour Office of the Apostolic See =

Labour relations office for the Vatican City State employees

The Labour Office of the Apostolic See is responsible for labour relations of the Holy See and Vatican City State with its employees. The office also settles labour issues which arise. It was instituted by Pope John Paul II on 1 January 1989.

The Labour Office's new statute entered into force in 2025.

== Presidents of the Labour Office of the Apostolic See ==
- Jan Pieter Schotte, C.I.C.M. (14 April 1989 – 10 January 2005)
- Francesco Marchisano (5 February 2005 – 3 July 2009)
- Giorgio Corbellini (3 July 2009 – 13 November 2019)
- Giuseppe Sciacca (26 January 2022 – 30 January 2025)

== Vice-Presidents of the Labour Office of the Apostolic See ==
1. Giovanni De Andrea (16 August 1989 – 13 October 2007)
