= René Brülhart =

Swiss lawyer

René Brülhart (born 1972) is a Swiss lawyer from Fribourg, who served as the President of the Board of Directors of the Financial Information Authority (AIF) of Vatican City. He was the first lay person serving in this position.

Brühlhart was raised in Düdingen and studied law at the University of Fribourg between 1993 and 1997. Before being nominated President of the AIF by Pope Francis on 19 November 2014, he served as the director of the same institution since November 2012 (nominated by Pope Benedict XVI). From 2004 to 2012 he headed Liechtenstein's financial intelligence unit which was elected by the Plenary to act as Vice-Chair of the Egmont group from 2010 to 2012.

== Controversy ==
On 18 November 2019 René Brülhart officially stepped down as President of the AIF. Though it was announced that he stepped down due to the expiration of his five-year term, Brülhart's resignation also came weeks after Vatican police raided his office, as well as the offices of other AIF officials, due to an ongoing corruption scandal. One major scandal involved using Peter's Pence, which serves as the Pope's charity fund, to buy luxury property in London as far back as 2012, when Brülhart first became a member of the AIF. In 2017, it was also acknowledged that the Vatican Secretariat of State, which serves as the Vatican's central administration bureaucracy, kept Swiss bank accounts, with the departments Prefect Pietro Parolin acknowledging that these accounts were used to hide charity money which was used to purchase the London property. Both the AIF and Secretariat assisted each other in the purchase, with the AIF even selling the Secretariat a share of the London property in 2014.

Pope Francis acknowledged the investigation during an interview while flying back to Rome on 26 November 2019. He also stated that interrogations have been taking place and it has been confirmed that "There is corruption in the Vatican" as well. On 27 November 2019 Carmelo Barbagallo, who previously served as head of the Bank of Italy's Supervision Office, was appointed by Pope Francis to succeed Brülhart.

Government offices
Preceded by Giorgio Corbellini	President of the Financial Information Authority; 2014 – 2019	Succeeded by Carmelo Barbagallo
