= Santi Angeli Custodi a Città Giardino =

Santi Angeli Custodi
- Santi Angeli Custodi a Città Giardino
- Chiesa dei Santi Angeli Custodi
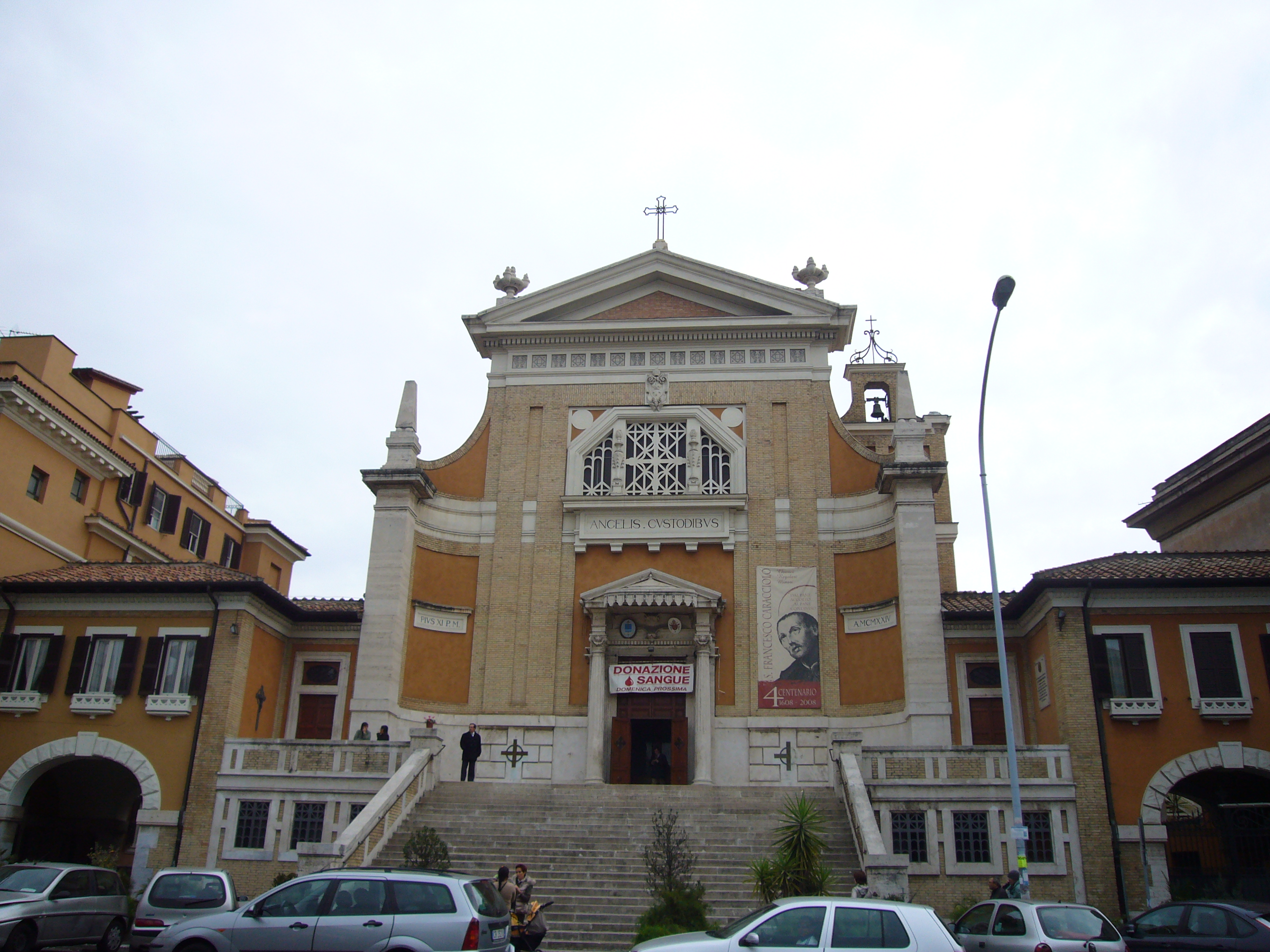
- Facade

- Location within Rome
- 41°56′9.12″N 12°32′8.93″E
- Location: Via delle Alpi Apuane 1, Rome
- Country: Italy
- Denomination: Roman Catholic
- Tradition: Latin Rite
- Religious institute: Clerics Regular Minor

History
- Founder: Pope Benedict XV
- Dedication: Guardian Angels

Architecture
- Architect: Gustavo Giovannoni
- Style: Baroque Revival
- Groundbreaking: 1922
- Completed: 1925

Specifications
- Materials: travertine

Administration
- Diocese: Rome

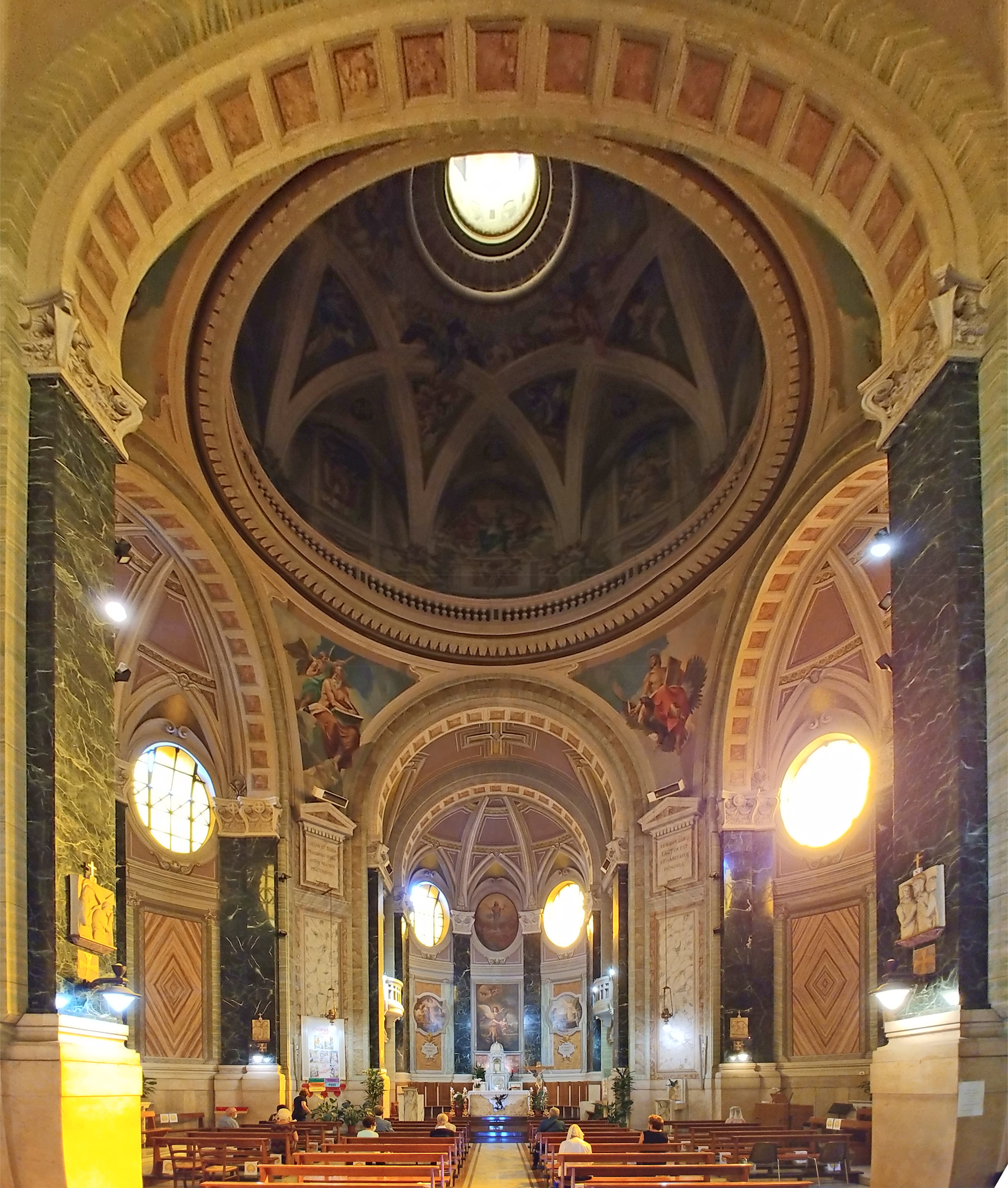
Interior

Santi Angeli Custodi (Holy Guardian Angels), church on Via Alpi Apuane, Rome.

== History ==
The church was built as a parochial church in 1922 in a new quarter of the city, the Città Giardino, on orders from Pope Benedict XV, to a design by Gustavo Giovannoni. The Clerics Regular Minor, founded by St Francesco Caracciolo and also known as the Caracciolini Fathers, started working in the area on 7 April that year, and on 8 December the church was consecrated and granted to them by Pope Pius XI. Six years later, in 1926, it was formally established as a parish.

It was built in a Neo-Classical style, inspired by the Italian Renaissance, with a staircase in front of the façade, a travertine doorway, a single nave with side chapels, and a basilical baldachino. The church's dome is decorated with frescoes by Aronne del Vecchio, painted in 1961, of The Angels in Paradise with the Most Holy Trinity and the Blessed Virgin. (with pendants of The Evangelists) who also made an image of The Deposition for the entrance to the sacristy and of The Birth of the Saviour for the church's side entrance. The high altarpiece is a copy of Guercino's St Michael the Archangel from San Pietro in Vaticano.

In the Piazza Sempione outside the church is a statue of the Immaculate Conception by Gino Giammei, made in 1949.

== Chapels ==
On the south side are

- the Chapel of the Most Holy Crucifix (Santissimo Crocifisso), named after a plaster crucifix which has been moved to the Chapel of the Blessed Sacrament, where the Caracciolini encourage perpetual adoration of the Most Holy Eucharist.
- the Chapel of the Madonna of Mercy (Madonna della Misericordia), the patron of this region of the city, with a statue from 1925 of the Blessed Virgin.

In the Chapel of St Francis Caracciolo is a painting by Romano Coradetti depicting Saints in Adoration of the Blessed Eucharist.

== Cardinal-deacons ==
- Alfredo Pacini (June–December 1967)
- Sebastiano Baggio (1969–1973; nominated cardinal-priest of San Sebastiano fuori le mura)
- Vacant (1973–2001)
- Agostino Cacciavillan (2001–2011; Cardinal-Priest: 2011–2022)
- Angelo Acerbi (2024-)
