= Lorenzo Antonetti =

Italian cardinal of the Catholic Church

His Eminence Lorenzo Antonetti
- President of the Administration of the Patrimony of the Apostolic See
- See: Sant’Agnese in Agone
- Appointed: 24 June 1995 (Pro-President)
- Term ended: 5 November 1998
- Predecessor: José Tomás Sánchez
- Successor: Agostino Cacciavillan
- Other post: Cardinal-Priest of Sant’Agnese in Agone
- Previous posts: Titular Archbishop of Rusellae (1968–1998); Apostolic Nuncio to Honduras (1968–1973); Apostolic Nuncio to Nicaragua (1968–1973); Apostolic Pro-Nuncio to the Democratic Republic of Congo (1973–1977); Secretary of the Administration of the Patrimony of the Apostolic See (1977–1988); Apostolic Nuncio to France (1988–1995); Cardinal-Deacon of Sant’Agnese in Agone (1998–2008)

Orders
- Ordination: 26 May 1945 by Leone Giacomo Ossola
- Consecration: 12 May 1968 by Amleto Giovanni Cicognani
- Created cardinal: 21 February 1998
- Rank: Cardinal-Priest

Personal details
- Born: 31 July 1922 Romagnano Sesia, Kingdom of Italy
- Died: 10 April 2013 (aged 90) Novara, Italy
- Denomination: Roman Catholic
- Motto: caritas et patientia christi
- Coat of arms

Lorenzo Antonetti (31 July 1922 – 10 April 2013) was a Cardinal in the Catholic Church, who held several positions in the Vatican diplomatic service.

== Early life and ordination ==
Antonetti was born on 31 July 1922 in Romagnano Sesia, Kingdom of Italy. On 26 May 1945, at the age of 22, Antonetti was ordained priest in Novara, Italy. He did pastoral ministry in diocese of Novara in 1946. He was sent to Rome for further studies from 1947 to 1951 at the Pontifical University of St. Thomas Aquinas, Angelicum, where he obtained a doctorate in theology and later at the Pontifical Gregorian University also in Rome where he was awarded a doctorate in canon law.

He was admitted to the elite Pontifical Ecclesiastical Academy to study diplomacy. He joined the Vatican Secretariat of State in 1951 and served as an attaché and later secretary in nunciature in Lebanon from 1952 to 1955. He was the secretary in nunciature in Venezuela from 1956 to 1959. He worked in the section of Extraordinary Affairs, Secretariat of State, from 1959 to 1963. He was appointed counselor in nunciature in France where he served from 1963 to 1967. He was appointed Domestic Prelate of His Holiness on 18 August 1964. He was counselor in apostolic delegation in the United States in 1968. He was appointed Titular Archbishop of Rusellae on 23 February 1968, aged 45.

== Apostolic nuncio ==
Antonetti was named Apostolic Nuncio to Honduras and Nicaragua on 23 February 1968. He was then appointed Apostolic Pro-Nuncio to the Democratic Republic of Congo (then Zaire) on 29 June 1973, where he remained until he became the Official of State, Roman Curia (appointed 15 June 1977).

Finally, he served as the Apostolic Nuncio to France to which he was appointed on 23 September 1988 and where he remained until 1995. In 1995, Pope John Paul II gave him the position of Pro-President of Administration of the Patrimony of the Apostolic See, Roman Curia, losing the "pro-" upon elevation to cardinal.

== Curia ==
Styles of Lorenzo Cardinal Antonetti
- Reference style: His Eminence
- Spoken style: Your Eminence
- Informal style: Cardinal
- See: Rusellae (titular)

Pope John Paul II created him Cardinal-Deacon of Saint Agnes in Agone on 21 February 1998. He retired as president of the Administration of the Patrimony of the Apostolic See in November 1998 becoming President Emeritus of Administration of the Patrimony of the Apostolic See.

On 1 March 2008, Antonetti was elevated to Cardinal-Priest.

He died in Novara on 10 April 2013.

Catholic Church titles
| Preceded by Angelo Felici | Apostolic Nuncio to France; 23 September 1988 – 24 June 1995 | Succeeded by Mario Tagliaferri |
| Preceded by Rosalio Lara | President of the Administration of the Patrimony of the Apostolic See; 24 June 1995 – 5 November 1998 | Succeeded by Agostino Cacciavillan |
