= Supervisory and Financial Information Authority =

Financial regulatory authority of the Vatican City

- Autorità di Supervisione e Informazione Finanziaria
- Abbreviation: ASIF
- Predecessor: Financial Information Authority
- Formation: 30 December 2010
- Type: Autonomous and independent Authority with supervisory and regulatory functions for the purposes of preventing and countering money laundering, the financing of terrorism and the financing of the proliferation of weapons of mass destruction and for prudential purposes, as well as financial intelligence
- Headquarters: Palazzo San Carlo, Vatican City
- Location: Vatican City
- Director: Federico Antellini Russo
- Website: www.asif.va

The Supervisory and Financial Information Authority (Italian: Autorità di Supervisione e Informazione Finanziaria; ASIF), which is guaranteed full autonomy and independence in the performance of its institutional functions, is the central institution in the Holy See and Vatican City State that has exclusive competence for supervision and regulation for the purpose of money laundering, the financing of terrorism and the financing of the proliferation of weapons of mass destruction (AML/CFT/CFP), financial intelligence and the prudential supervision and regulation of entities that carry out a financial activity on a professional basis. ASIF may serve as an alternative dispute resolution body for dispute that may arise between customers and entities that carry out a financial activity on a professional basis in relation to financial transactions and services.

In the field of preventing money laundering, the financing of terrorism and the financing of proliferation of weapons of mass destruction, it is, in fact, the central supervisory and regulatory authority in this area, both in relation to the obliged entities (i.e. the entities who, due to the activities they carry out, are subject to the obligations set out in the AML/CFT/CFP legislation) and the reporting entities (i.e. entities who, under Vatican law, are required to report suspicious activities). With regard to obliged entities, there is only one such entity in the jurisdiction – the Institute for the Works of Religion – while the reporting entities consist of every legal entity with a registered office in the Vatican City State and all the Institutions of the Roman Curia.

In the field of countering of money laundering, the financing of terrorism and the financing of the proliferation of weapon of mass destruction, the ASIF also is the Holy See and Vatican City State financial intelligence unit, which is responsible for acquiring and analyzing the suspicious activity reports submitted by reporting entities, making use of internal and international collaboration (the Authority is a member of the Egmont Group). Furthermore, ASIF is also the central authority for the supervision and prudential regulation of entities that professionally carry out financial activities (to date, exclusively the Institute for the Works of Religion).

According to the latest annual report, there were 78 reports of suspicious activity, in line with the system’s development and with expectations that have evolved following the stabilisation phase observed in 2024, as well as owing to the implementation of the measures required of the main reporting entity following the targeted inspection carried out in 2024 and activities related to the extraordinary events affecting the Catholic Church and the Holy See in 2025. During the year, 16 reports were forwarded to the Office of the Promoter of Justice, in line with previous financial years, maintaining a consistent ratio between financial analysis and referrals to the judicial authorities. In terms of supervisory activities, ASIF continued to take action to strengthen the standards of sound and prudent management of the Institute for the Works of Religion. 2025 marked a structured intensification of relations with foreign supervisory and financial intelligence counterparts. Meetings and working groups fostered convergence on operational standards and best practices, helping to consolidate an increasingly solid and functional network of bilateral relations between counterparts. The follow-up by the Moneyval committee on the current legal and regulatory framework confirmed a rating of full or high compliance for 35 of the 39 applicable recommendations.

== Overview and history ==
The ASIF, originally named the Financial Information Authority (Autorità di Informazione Finanziaria, or AIF), was established by Pope Benedict XVI on 30 December 2010 with the Apostolic Letter issued Motu Proprio" for the prevention and countering of illegal activities in the area of monetary and financial dealings". In August 2013, the Authority was given the mandate by Pope Francis to also carry out prudential supervision. The powers of the Authority were confirmed by Pope Francis on 15 November 2013 through an Apostolic Letter issued Motu Proprio, with which a new Statute was approved. On 5 December 2020, Pope Francis approved an updated version of the Statute, by virtue of which the Authority took on its current name and a new organizational structure, one that is more responsive to its operational and institutional needs. However, the skills and functions remained unchanged, as also reiterated in Article 248 of the Apostolic Constitution "Praedicate Evangelium" of 19 March 2022.

By a chirograph dated 25 June 2026, Pope Leo XIV approved the new ASIF Statute. The reform forms part of a constantly evolving international regulatory framework. The new Statute fully incorporates the latest developments in the international standards of the Financial Action Task Force (FATF), the Egmont Group of Financial Intelligence Units, and the Sixth AML Directive This regulatory update reflects the Holy See’s commitment to maintaining a constructive and ongoing dialogue with the leading international financial regulatory bodies, whilst honouring the commitments made over the years to the international community. ASIF is led by a Directorate – comprising a Director and a Deputy Director – supported by Consulters, who are required to provide expert analysis on matters within their remit. ASIF is divided into three Units (the AML/CFT/CFP Supervision and Regulation Unit, the Prudential Supervision and Regulation Unit and the Financial Intelligence Unit) and includes the cross-functional role of Head of Legal Affairs.

The Director:

- Federico Antellini Russo, (since 27 November 2024)

== Past presidents ==
- Cardinal Attilio Nicora (january 2011 – january 2014)
- Mons. Giorgio Corbellini (january 2014 - november 2014 ad interim)
- René Brülhart (november 2014 – november 2019)
- Carmelo Barbagallo (november 2019 - february 2026)

== Past directorate members ==
- Francesco De Pasquale (2011 – 2013) (Director); Alfredo Pallini (2011 – 2012) (deputy director)
- René Brülhart (2013 – 2014) (Director); Tommaso Di Ruzza (2014 – 2015) (deputy director ad interim)
- Tommaso Di Ruzza (june 2015 – january 2020) (Director)
- Giuseppe Schlitzer (April 2020 - March 2025) (Director)
- Federico Antellini Russo (April 2020 - november 2024) (Deputy Director)

== See also ==
- List of financial supervisory authorities by country
