= Administration of the Patrimony of the Apostolic See =

Central Bank of Vatican City

The Administration of the Patrimony of the Apostolic See (APSA; Italian: Amministrazione del Patrimonio della Sede Apostolica; Latin: Administratio Patrimonii Sedis Apostolicae) is the office of the Roman Curia that deals with the "provisions owned by the Holy See in order to provide the funds necessary for the Roman Curia to function". It was established by Pope Paul VI on 15 August 1967 and reorganized on 8 July 2014. APSA acts as the treasury and central bank of Vatican City and the Holy See.

Both before and after the reorganization of its functions in 2014, APSA has been distinct from the Prefecture for the Economic Affairs of the Holy See.

== Assets ==
The assets entrusted to the administration (previously in the care of what was its Extraordinary Section) were initially 750 million Italian lire (at that time equivalent to £8,152,000) in cash and 1 billion Italian lire (at that time equivalent to £10,869,000) in Italian State bonds, an amount less than Italy would have paid under the Law of Guarantees of 1871, if the Holy See had accepted this. A 2012 report from the Council of Europe identified the value of a section of the Vatican's property assets as an amount in excess of €680 million (£570 million); as of January 2013, a papal official in Rome named Paolo Mennini manages this portion of the Holy See's assets—consisting of British investments, other European holdings and a currency trading arm. The Guardian described Mennini as "in effect the pope's merchant banker [who] heads a special unit inside the Vatican called the extraordinary division of APSA – Amministrazione del Patrimonio della Sede Apostolica – which handles the so-called 'patrimony of the Holy See'." In total, APSA valued the total patrimony managed by the Vatican at over 2.9 billion dollars (2.7 billion euros) in 2023.

== History ==
Pope Paul VI established APSA as part of his broader reform of the Roman Curia in the apostolic constitution Regimini Ecclesiae universae issued on 15 August 1967. It is the latest in a series of bodies first established in 1878 and subject to periodic modifications in name and remit.

APSA was composed originally of two sections:

- The Ordinary Section continued the work of the Administration of the Property of the Holy See, a commission that Pope Leo XIII set up in 1880, initially as an advisory body, and to which in 1891 he gave direct responsibility for administering the property remaining to the Holy See after the complete loss of the Papal States in 1870.
- The Extraordinary Section administers the funds given by the Italian government to implement the Financial Convention attached to the Lateran Treaty of 1929. Before the establishment of APSA, these latter funds were managed by the Special Administration of the Holy See. After World War II, the International Monetary Fund recognized the Administration of the Property of the Holy See, as the central bank of Vatican City.

On 9 July 2014, the Ordinary Section of APSA was transferred to the Secretariat for the Economy. Only the Extraordinary Section remained within the purview of APSA. Since then APSA focuses exclusively on its role as a treasury for the Holy See and the Vatican City State.

Although Pope John Paul II's apostolic constitution Pastor bonus specified that APSA is headed by a prelate with the rank of cardinal, the custom of giving the president of APSA the temporary title of "Pro-President" until he becomes a cardinal has fallen into disuse; Pope John Paul and his successors have all given the title of president to prelates who were not yet cardinals.

On 19 December 2017, Gustavo Óscar Zanchetta was appointed a councilor (assessore) of APSA, a position that had not existed until his appointment. He remained at APSA for several years.

In 2021 it was revealed that Libero Milone the first auditor general in an interview confirmed Holy See invested funds in a pharmaceutical company which produces an emergency contraceptive “morning after pill,” but sold its shares in the company when the Vatican’s auditor reported the investment to senior Church officials.

The apostolic constitution Praedicate evangelium, which takes effect in June 2022, identifies the head of APSA as a president without any requirement as to clerical status. When it took effect, the president was a bishop who was not given the personal title of archbishop, which was previously the custom for both the president and, as recently as 2002, the secretary of the agency. Since 2011, the secretary has been a priest, not a bishop.

== List of presidents ==
- Amleto Giovanni Cicognani (7 May 1968 – 30 April 1969)
- Jean-Marie Villot (2 May 1969 – 9 March 1979)
- Giuseppe Caprio (28 April 1979 – 30 January 1981)
  - initially named pro-president; president when made a cardinal in July 1979
- Agostino Casaroli (30 January 1981 – 8 April 1984)
- Agnelo Rossi (8 April 1984 – 6 December 1989)
- Rosalio José Castillo Lara (6 December 1989 – 24 June 1995)
- Lorenzo Antonetti (24 June 1995 – 5 November 1998)
  - initially named pro-president; president when made cardinal in February 1998
- Agostino Cacciavillan (5 November 1998 – 1 October 2002)
  - an archbishop named president though not a cardinal until February 2001
- Attilio Nicora (1 October 2002 – 7 July 2011)
  - given the personal title of archbishop and named president though not a cardinal until October 2003
- Domenico Calcagno (7 July 2011 - 26 June 2018)
  - given the personal title of archbishop when named secretary of APSA in 2007
  - named president though not a cardinal until February 2012
- Nunzio Galantino (26 June 2018 – 2 October 2023)
  - a bishop named president though not a cardinal
- Giordano Piccinotti, S.D.B. (2 October 2023 – present)
  - a priest named president, then named a titular archbishop on 31 January 2024

== See also ==
Peregrinatio ad Petri Sedem
