= Sebastiano Baggio =

Former Cardinal

His Eminence Sebastiano Baggio
- President for the Pontifical Commission of the Vatican State; President of the Governorate of Vatican City State
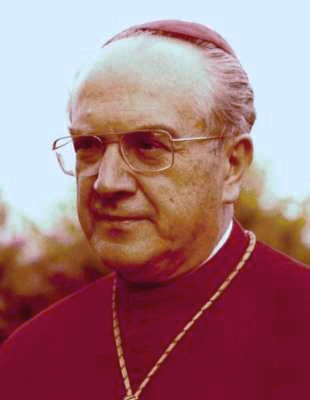
- Church: Roman Catholic Church
- Appointed: 8 April 1984
- Term ended: 31 October 1990
- Predecessor: Agostino Casaroli
- Successor: Rosalio José Castillo Lara
- Other posts: Cardinal-Bishop of Velletri-Segni (1974–93); Patron of the Order of Malta (1984–93); Camerlengo of the Apostolic Camera (1985–93); Vice-Dean of the College of Cardinals (1986–93)
- Previous posts: Titular Archbishop of Ephesus (1953–69); Apostolic Nuncio to Chile (1953–59); Apostolic Delegate to Canada (1959–64); Apostolic Nuncio to Brazil (1964–69); Cardinal-Deacon of Santi Angeli Custodi a Città Giardino (1969–73); Archbishop of Cagliari (1969–73); Prefect of the Congregation for Bishops (1973–84); President of the Pontifical Commission for Latin America (1973–84); Cardinal-Priest of San Sebastiano alle Catacombe (1973–74)

Orders
- Ordination: 21 December 1935 by Ferdinando Rudolph
- Consecration: 26 July 1953 by Adeodato Giovanni Piazza
- Created cardinal: 28 April 1969 by Pope Paul VI
- Rank: Cardinal-Deacon (1969–73); Cardinal-Priest (1973–74); Cardinal-Bishop (1974–93)

Personal details
- Born: Sebastiano Baggio; 16 May 1913 Rosà, Vicenza, Kingdom of Italy
- Died: 21 March 1993 (aged 79) Agostino Gemelli University Polyclinic, Rome, Italy
- Education: Pontifical Gregorian University
- Motto: Operando custodire
- Coat of arms

Styles of Sebastiano Cardinal Baggio
- Reference style: His Eminence
- Spoken style: Your Eminence
- Religious style: Monsignor
- Informal style: Cardinal
- See: Velletri-Segni

Sebastiano Baggio (16 May 1913 – 21 March 1993) was an Italian cardinal, often thought to be a likely candidate for election to the papacy. He served as President of the Pontifical Commission for Vatican City State and President of the Governorate of Vatican City State from 1984 to 1990 and was Prefect of the Sacred Congregation for Bishops from 1973 to 1984.

== Early life and priestly ministry ==
Born in Rosà, Veneto, Sebastiano was ordained a priest on 21 December 1935, at the age of 22, in Vicenza. He took postgraduate studies and joined the Holy See's diplomatic service with the first posting as attaché to the Apostolic nunciature in Austria in 1938.

== Episcopal ministry ==
In 1953, he was consecrated a bishop and given the rank of archbishop. He served as Apostolic Nuncio to Chile from 1953 to 1959; Apostolic Delegate to Canada from 1959 to 1964; and Apostolic Nuncio to Brazil from 1964 to 1969. Pope Paul VI raised him to the rank of cardinal on 30 April 1969, assigning him as a cardinal deacon the title of Santi Angeli Custodi a Città Giardino. Pope Paul appointed him Archbishop of Cagliari in Sardinia on 23 June 1969.

He was appointed prefect of the Congregation for Bishops on 26 February 1973.

One of the most influential posts he held in Rome, between 1973 and 1984 was Prefect of the Congregation of Bishops, whose task is to prepare lists of candidates for the episcopacy. One obituary in the London Independent noted that: "though Baggio always insisted that he was not the bishop-maker – he proposed while the Pope alone disposed – he did in effect have considerable powers of patronage. He had immense knowledge of the dossiers of possible candidates, and knew their weaknesses for drink or women.". He was credited as a talent spotter in furthering the episcopal career of Cardinal Alfonso López Trujillo who shared many of Baggio's concern at the direction of the Church in South America.

The same obituary, written by the respected Catholic journalist Peter Hebblethwaite, drew attention to Baggio's relationship with Opus Dei and his battles with Fr Pedro Arrupe, the Jesuit Superior General, over the future of Central American policy: "Baggio – and Pope John Paul – wanted a 'unitary policy' for Central America which the Jesuits and other religious orders thought impossible in view of the different situations: civil war in El Salvador, dictatorship in Panama, a post-revolutionary regime in Nicaragua, and a persecuting born-again General in Guatemala."

He participated in the two conclaves of 1978 and when he died in 1993 at Rome, at age 79 was both Camerlengo of the Holy Roman Church, and a sub-dean of the College of Cardinals. He had been a priest for 57 years, a bishop for 39 years, and a cardinal for 23 years. Described as "affable, smiling, squat and somewhat worldly, Baggio was deeply attached to his native Rosà and not only willed that his remains were to be buried in the family tomb but inside the local cemetery."

== Personal life ==
Baggio was one of the people accused on the so-called Pecorelli list, alleging membership in Freemasonry of 121 men associated with the Vatican, where he is listed with the code name “SEBA”, supposedly initiated on 14 August 1957. This list was named for the Italian journalist Carmine Pecorelli (himself a member of Propaganda Due, assassinated in 1979), who published it in his journal Osservatore Politico in 1978, but it had also been published elsewhere in Panorama two years earlier.

Catholic Church titles
Preceded by Paolo Bertoli	Camerlengo of the Holy Roman Church; 25 March 1985 – 21 March 1993	Succeeded by Eduardo Martínez Somalo
Preceded by vacant title last held by Paolo Marella	Vice-Dean of the College of Cardinals; 15 April 1986 – 21 March 1993	Succeeded by Agostino Casaroli
