= Furni, Tunisia =

Furni, also known as a Furnos Maius and Ain-Fourna, was a Roman era civitas of the Roman province of Africa Proconsularis on the Oued Kibira tributary of the Meliane River (about seven miles from Zama).

A Donatist bishop of the see assisted at the Council of Carthage (411). The town was made famous by the courage of the martyr Mansuetus of Urusi, who was burned alive, according to Victor of Vita at the gate of Urusi, also known as the gate of Furni. In 305, during the same persecution the basilicas of Furni and Zama had been burned.

The diocese was refounded in name at least in the 20th century, as a titular bishopric of the Roman Catholic Church. The current bishop is Aliaksandr Yasheuski.

The city is sometimes cited as being the ruins at Henchir-Boudja, though these ruins are known to be Lemsa through in situ inscriptions.
