= Pope Paul VI's reform of the Roman Curia =

```

Pope Paul VI's reform of the Roman Curia was accomplished through a series of decrees beginning in 1964, principally through the apostolic constitution Regimini Ecclesiae universae issued on 15 August 1967.

On 28 October 1965, the bishops attending Second Vatican Council had asked Pope Paul VI to consider how the departments of the Roman Curia could "be reorganized and better adapted to the needs of the times, regions, and rites especially as regards their number, name, competence and peculiar method of procedure, as well as the coordination of work among them."

== Early changes ==
On 2 April 1964, Paul VI established the Pontifical Commission for Social Communications. (Note: This council was merged into the new Secretariat for Communications on 27 June 2015)

As part of the preparations for the Second Vatican Council, Pope John XXIII has created the Secretariat for Promoting Christian Unity on 5 June 1960. Paul VI added two more secretariats to extend the Vatican's attempt to establish relationships with the non-Catholic world, with other religious groups and with the non-religious. On 19 May 1964, Paul VI established the Secretariate for non-Christians and named Cardinal Paolo Marella, a Vatican diplomat for forty years, fifteen of then stationed in Japan, to head it. The title of his decree, Progrediente concilio ("While the Council is proceeding"), hinted that this was a harbinger of a larger reform that would await the conclusion of the council. On 6 April 1965, Paul VI established the Secretariat for Dialogue with Non-Believers. (Note: This secretariat became a Pontifical Council and was merged into the Pontifical Council for Culture by John Paul II on 25 March 1993.) He named Franz König, Archbishop of Vienna, its president. (Note: König kept his Vienna position and residence.)

Paul VI issued Integrae servandae on 7 December 1965, the eve of the ceremony marking the end of the Second Vatican Council. It accomplished one significant modification to that part of the Roman Curia that had proved most controversial during the council for its management—its critics would say manipulation—of the proceedings. With this letter, the Sacred Congregation of the Holy Office temporarily lost its designation as "Sacred" and received a new title that specified its area of competence: the Congregation for the Doctrine of the Faith. It restricted the department's right to act secretly and provided rights to those accused of heresy. Authors of books acquired rights to notification and a hearing before the department could ban their work. It was instructed to coordinate its work with the Pontifical Biblical Commission, which meant that it would have to take account of new scholarly approaches to biblical texts, a movement it had long resisted. Its traditional autonomy and insularity were challenged by requirements to use consultors named by the pope and to consider the views of "congresses of the learned" and regional associations of bishops.

Paul VI created the Council of the Laity and the Pontifical Commission Iustitia et Pax on 6 January 1967. To the latter, on 15 July 1971, he added the Pontifical Council Cor Unum for Promoting Human and Christian Development. He named Cardinal Jean Villot, his Secretary of State, as its president.

== Regimini Ecclesiae universae ==
=== Organization and responsibilities ===
With Regimini Ecclesiae universae,

- The Sacred Consistorial Congregation (Note: Its full name was the Congregation for the Erection of Churches and Consistorial Provisions) became the Sacred Congregation for Bishops
- The Sacred Congregation for the Oriental Church became the Sacred Congregation for the Oriental Churches, recognizing the existence of several Eastern Catholic Churches. It was also raised in rank ahead of the Congregation for Bishops.
- The Sacred Congregation of the council, founded as the Sacred Congregation of the Council of Trent to implement that council's mandates, became the Congregation for the Clergy.
- The Sacred Congregation of Religious became the Sacred Congregation for the Religious and Secular Institutes, making explicit its competence for institutes other than religious institutes in the strict sense).
- The Sacred Congregation of the Propagation of the Faith became the Sacred Congregation for the Evangelization of Peoples
- The Sacred Congregation of Seminaries and Universities became the Sacred Congregation for Catholic Education

New bodies (largely taking over functions previously carried out, sometimes in less coordinated form, by earlier bodies) were founded by Regimini. They included two offices to manage and oversee financial affairs, the Administration of the Patrimony of the Apostolic See and the Prefecture for the Economic Affairs of the Holy See.

The functions of some offices that had already been severely reduced were abolished: the Sacred Ceremonial Congregation and the Apostolic Datary.

The competencies of the Sacred Roman Rota and the Supreme Tribunal of the Apostolic Signatura were extended.

=== Procedures ===
Previously, only cardinals were members of the congregations of the Curia. Pope Paul VI decreed that the members could also be bishops who were not cardinals. With Regimini Ecclesiae universae he laid down also that appointments to membership of congregations and as heads of departments would be for five-year periods only, and that appointment for an additional five-year period would also be possible. As before, the members of a congregation do not intervene in the day-to-day operations of the congregation, which is in the hands of the Prefect and the permanent staff, headed generally by the Secretary and the Undersecretary. Membership normally meet to discuss more general problems and to determine guidelines no more than once a year.

The permanent staff is to be of international provenance, chosen from people with suitable preparation and with pastoral experience. These have no claim on promotion to the highest positions.

Each congregation is to have consultors, who are appointed for five-year (renewable) periods.

Account must be taken of the wishes of the episcopal conferences.

The most widely known languages may be used, as well as Latin.

Pope Paul VI also established that, on the death of a pope, the posts of heads of departments become vacant, with the exception of those of Cardinal Vicar for Rome, Camerlengo and Major Penitentiary. A new pope is therefore free to name department heads of his own choosing.

Periodic meetings of the heads of departments can be called by the Cardinal Secretary of State with a view to coordinating activities, providing information and gathering suggestions.

Other meetings between officials of more than one departments are also held in accordance with needs. Meetings involving the Congregations for Bishops, for the Clergy, for Religious, and for Catholic Education are to be held at fixed times to deal with questions concerning the clergy in general.

== Later changes ==
The Sacred Congregation of Rites was divided into two on 8 May 1969 to become the Sacred Congregation for the Causes of Saints with responsibility for managing cases of beatification and canonization and the Sacred Congregation for Divine Worship with responsibility for liturgical practices. The later was combined on 11 July 1975 with the Sacred Congregation for the Discipline of the Sacraments to form the Sacred Congregation for Divine Worship and the Discipline of the Sacraments.

The functions of the Apostolic Chancery, reduced by Pope Pius X in 1908 to little more than signing papal bulls were transferred in 1973 to the Cardinal Secretary of State.
