= Stanisław Ryłko =

Polish Roman Catholic cardinal (born 1945)

His Eminence Stanisław Cardinal Ryłko
- Cardinal, Archpriest Emeritus of the Basilica of Santa Maria Maggiore
- Appointed: 28 December 2016
- Term ended: 4 July 2025
- Predecessor: Santos Abril y Castelló
- Successor: Rolandas Makrickas
- Other post: Cardinal-Priest of Sacro Cuore di Cristo Re "pro hac vice"
- Previous posts: Titular Archbishop of Novica (1995–2007); Secretary of the Pontifical Council for the Laity (1995–2003); President of the Pontifical Council for the Laity (2003–2016)

Orders
- Ordination: 30 March 1969 by Karol Józef Wojtyła (later Pope John Paul II)
- Consecration: 6 January 1996 by Pope John Paul II
- Created cardinal: 24 November 2007 by Pope Benedict XVI
- Rank: Cardinal-Priest

Personal details
- Born: Stanisław Ryłko; 4 July 1945 (age 81) Andrychów, Poland
- Denomination: Roman Catholic
- Motto: Lux Mea Christus (Christ, My Light)
- Coat of arms

Styles of Stanisław Cardinal Ryłko
- Reference style: His Eminence
- Spoken style: Your Eminence
- Informal style: Cardinal
- See: Sacro Cuore di Cristo Re

Stanisław Marian Ryłko (born 4 July 1945) is a Polish cardinal of the Catholic Church. He held positions in the Roman Curia beginning in 1987 and was president of the Pontifical Council for the Laity from 2003 to 2016. He was made a cardinal in 2007. He was Archpriest of the Basilica of Santa Maria Maggiore from 2016 to 2025.

Besides his native Polish, he speaks Italian, English, and German.

== Early life and pastoral work ==
Stanisław Ryłko was born on 4 July 1945 in Andrychów to Władysław and Aurelia Ryłko. He has two siblings: a brother, Władysław (d. 2007), and a sister, Jadwiga Krasoń. He graduated from the Lyceum of Maria Skłodowska-Curie in Andrychów in 1963. He entered the seminary in Kraków in 1963 and earned his licentiate in moral theology Pontifical Faculty of Theology in Krakow in 1971. He was ordained to the priesthood by Cardinal Karol Wojtyła (later Pope John Paul II) on 30 March 1969 in Wawel Cathedral, and then did pastoral work in Poronin until 1971.

Beginning in 1972 Ryłko studied at the Pontifical Gregorian University, where he earned his doctorate in social sciences in 1978. He was then vice-rector of the Kraków seminary and taught practical theology at the Pontifical Theological Academy of Kraków from 1978 to 1987. From 1979 on he was secretary of the lay apostolate commission of the Polish Episcopal Conference as well. In 1987, he returned to Rome and headed the youth section of the Pontifical Council for the Laity for five years, which included organizing World Youth Day events of 1989 and 1991. He was transferred to the Polish section of the Vatican Secretariat of State in 1992.

== Bishop ==
On 20 December 1995, Pope John Paul II appointed Ryłko secretary of the Pontifical Council for the Laity and Titular Bishop of Novica. He received his episcopal consecration on 6 January 1996 from John Paul II, with Archbishops Giovanni Re and Jorge Mejía serving as co-consecrators. As secretary, Ryłko served as the second-highest official of that council under Eduardo Francisco Pironio and James Stafford.

On 11 January 1996 he was named a member of the Pontifical Council for the Pastoral Care of Migrants and Itinerant People and on 22 February a consultant to the Congregation for the Doctrine of the Faith.

He was named president of the Pontifical Council for the Laity on 4 October 2003. Following the death of John Paul II on 2 April 2005, Pope Benedict XVI confirmed Ryłko in that position on 21 April 2005.

== Cardinal ==
In the consistory of 24 November 2007, Pope Benedict made him Cardinal-Deacon of Sacro Cuore di Cristo Re.

On 12 June 2008 Benedict appointed him a member of several departments in the Roman Curia: the Congregation for the Causes of Saints, the Congregation for Bishops, and the Pontifical Commission for Latin America. In November 2008, in an address to the plenary assembly of the Congregation for the Laity, Ryłko said that the time has come for Christians to free themselves from their false inferiority complex against the so-called secular world, to be courageous disciples of Christ.

On 5 January 2011 he was named one of the first members of the new Pontifical Council for the Promotion of the New Evangelisation. On 10 March 2015, Pope Francis appointed Rylko a Member of the Pontifical Committee for International Eucharistic Congresses.

His tenure as head of the Pontifical Council on the Laity ended on 1 September 2016 when its functions were taken over by the new Dicastery for the Laity, Family and Life.

On 28 December 2016, Pope Francis appointed Rylko Archpriest of the Basilica of Santa Maria Maggiore. On 11 August 2018, he was named a member of the Pontifical Commission for Vatican City State.

Rylko participated as a cardinal elector in the 2013 papal conclave that elected Pope Francis and the 2025 papal conclave that elected Pope Leo XIV.

Catholic Church titles
Preceded by Paul Josef Cordes	Secretary of the Pontifical Council for the Laity; 20 December 1995 – 4 October 2003	Succeeded by Josef Clemens
Preceded by Thomas Joseph Tobin	— TITULAR — Titular Bishop of Novica; 20 December 1995 – 4 October 2003	Himself as Titular Archbishop
Himself as Titular Bishop	— TITULAR — Titular Archbishop of Novica; 4 October 2003 – 24 November 2007	Succeeded by Jude Thaddeus Okolo
Preceded by James Stafford	President of the Pontifical Council for the Laity; 4 October 2003 – 1 September 2016	Office abolished
Preceded by Carlo Furno	Cardinal-Deacon of Sacro Cuore di Cristo Re; 24 November 2007 – 19 May 2018	Himself as Cardinal-Priest
Himself as Cardinal-Deacon	Cardinal-Priest 'pro hac vice' of Sacro Cuore di Cristo Re; 19 May 2018 –	Incumbent
Preceded by Santos Abril y Castelló	Archpriest of the Basilica of Santa Maria Maggiore; 28 December 2016 –	Succeeded by Rolandas Makrickas
