= Federico Callori di Vignale =

Catholic cardinal from 1965 to 1971 (1890–1971)

His Eminence Federico Callori di Vignale
- Cardinal-Deacon of San Giovanni Bosco in Via Tuscolana
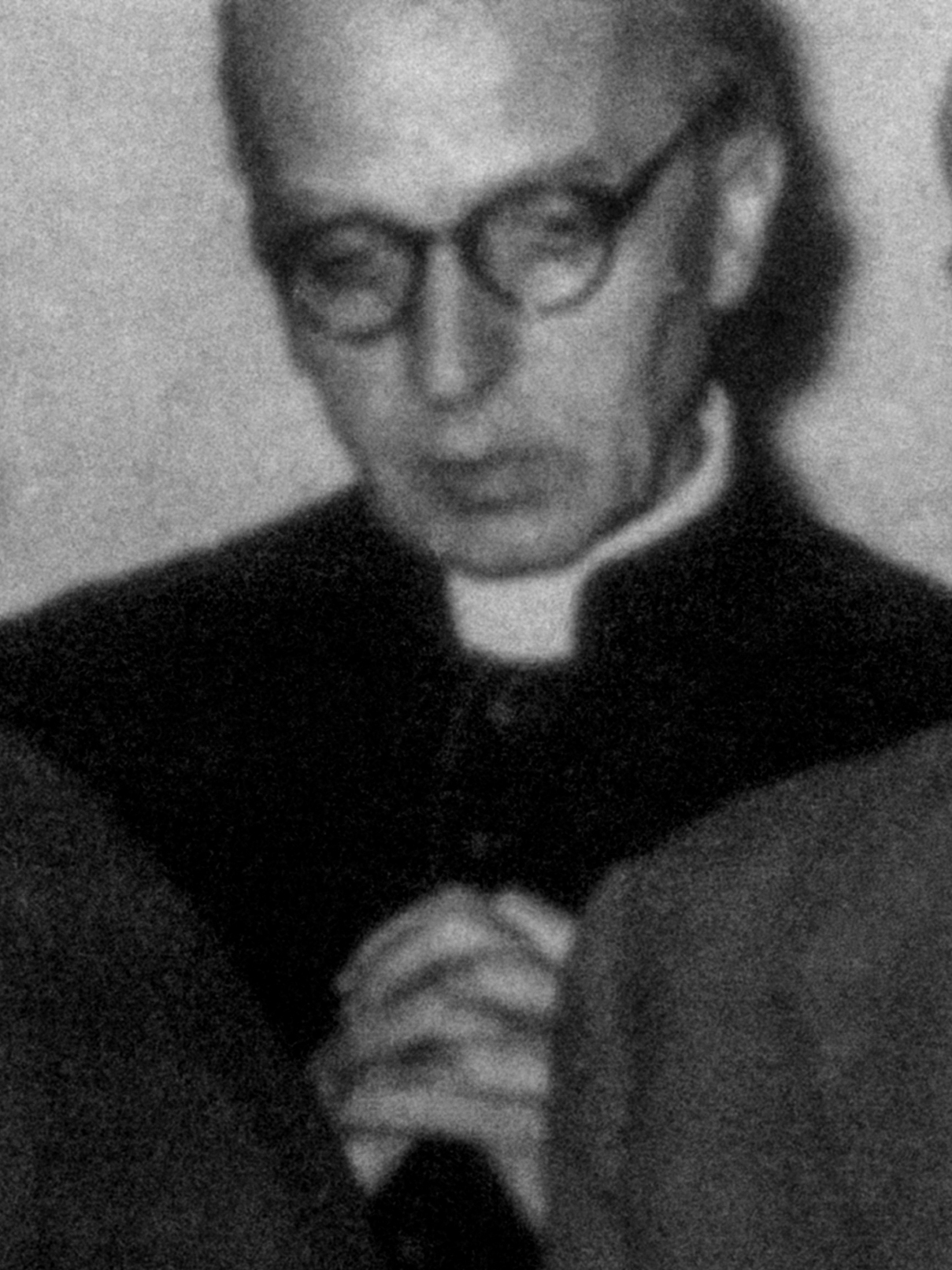
- Church: Roman Catholic Church
- Appointed: 25 February 1965
- Term ended: 10 August 1971
- Successor: Štěpán Trochta
- Other post: Cardinal Protodeacon (1971)
- Previous posts: Pro-Camerlengo of the Apostolic Camera (1950–58); Pro-Master of the Apostolic Palaces (1950–58); Prefect of the Apostolic Palaces (1958–65); Titular Archbishop of Maiuca (1965–65)

Orders
- Ordination: 16 December 1917
- Consecration: 21 February 1965 by Eugène Tisserant
- Created cardinal: 22 February 1965 by Pope Paul VI
- Rank: Cardinal-Deacon

Personal details
- Born: Federico Callori di Vignale; 15 December 1890 Vignale Monferrato, Kingdom of Italy
- Died: 10 August 1971 (aged 80) Vatican City
- Parents: Ranieri Massimiliano Callori di Vignale; Emanuela Beccaria Incisa
- Education: Pontifical Gregorian University; Pontifical Ecclesiastical Academy
- Motto: In tenebris tamen absque tenebris
- Coat of arms

Styles of Federico Callori di Vignale
- Reference style: His Eminence
- Spoken style: Your Eminence
- Informal style: Cardinal
- See: none

Federico Callori di Vignale (15 December 1890 – 10 August 1971) was an Italian Cardinal of the Roman Catholic Church. He served as Master of the Sacred Apostolic Palace from 1958 to 1965 and was made a cardinal in 1965.

== Biography ==
Federico Callori di Vignale was born in Vignale Monferrato to a noble family, and studied at the Pontifical Gregorian University and Pontifical Ecclesiastical Academy, both in Rome. He was ordained to the priesthood on 16 December 1917, and then did pastoral work in Rome until 1958. During that time, Callori was raised to the rank of Privy Chamberlain participant (6 July 1919), Domestic Prelate of His Holiness (28 May 1935), canon of St. Peter's Basilica (3 June 1935), and protonotary apostolic (6 June 1935). He was made Pro-Master of the Papal Chamber on 20 December 1950 before becoming a Knight Grand Cross of the Order of Merit of the Italian Republic on 12 January 1953, and Master of the Sacred Apostolic Palace on 29 October 1958. Also in 1958, he was awarded the Grand Decoration of Honour in Silver with Sash for Services to the Republic of Austria

In anticipation of making him a cardinal, Pope Paul VI appointed Callori titular archbishop of Maiuca on 15 February 1965. He received his episcopal consecration on 21 February from Cardinal Eugène-Gabriel-Gervais-Laurent Tisserant. Pope Paul created him Cardinal-Deacon of San Giovanni Bosco in Via Tuscolana on 22 February. Following the ceremony, which was somewhat disorganized as Enrico Dante, the papal Master of Ceremonies, was one of the new cardinals and could not perform his customary role, Callori reportedly complained, "Now they have made me more ridiculous than ever," as he tossed his biretta onto his limousine seat. He served as Cardinal Protodeacon from 31 March 1971 until his death.

Cardinal Callori died in Vatican City at the age of 80. He is buried at his family's chapel-tomb in his native Vignale Monferrato.

Catholic Church titles
Preceded by unknown	Master of the Sacred Apostolic Palace; 1958–1965	Succeeded by Mario Nasalli Rocca di Corneliano
Preceded by Michael Browne, OP	Cardinal Protodeacon; 1971	Succeeded by Charles Journet
