= Armenian Brazilians =

Brazilians of Armenian birth or descent

Armenian Brazilians Armeno-brasileiros Բրազիլահայեր
Total population
- 40,000–100,000

Regions with significant populations
- São Paulo; Rio de Janeiro

Languages
- Portuguese; Armenian

Religion
- Christianity (Armenian Apostolic Church, Roman Catholicism), and others

Related ethnic groups
- Other White Brazilians, Armenians

Armenian Brazilians (Armenian: Բրազիլահայեր, romanized: Brazilahayer; Portuguese: armeno-brasileiro, armênio-brasileiro) are citizens or residents of Brazil who have total or partial Armenian ancestry. It is estimated that approximately 100,000 Armenians and their descendants reside in Brazil, with the majority concentrated in the state of São Paulo and Rio de Janeiro. Armenian immigrants in Brazil gathered mostly in and around the city of São Paulo, where there are churches, cultural centers, and even a metro station called Armênia, named after the country.

== History ==
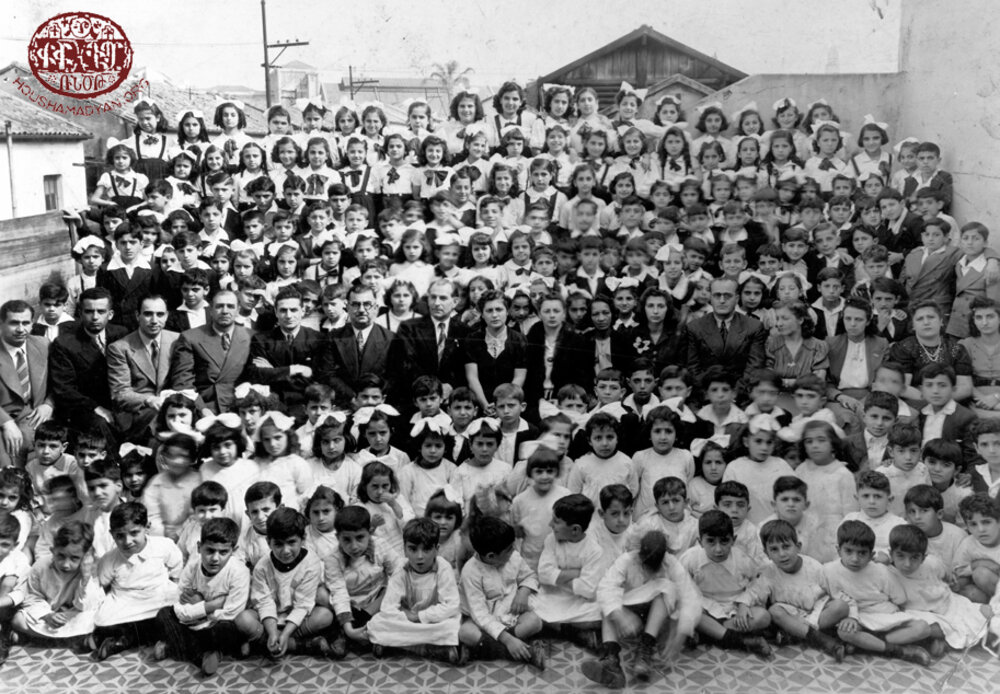
Armenian School in Brazil in 1945

Armenian immigration to Brazil began in the second half of the 19th century. Until 1915, the number of Armenians in Brazil remained relatively low and not demographically significant. A small community formed in Rio de Janeiro, comprising approximately 300 families, many of whom had arrived seeking employment in port reconstruction projects in Rio de Janeiro and Santos. These immigrants were often poorly documented and typically worked as peddlers. Over time, some achieved economic success, founding businesses such as Lanifício Varam and Gasparian & Filleppo in the textile industry. Due to their small numbers and occupational similarities with other Levantine groups, Armenians during this period were frequently assimilated into broader communities of Syrian and Lebanese immigrants and did not initially establish distinct communal institutions.

The first recorded Armenian to visit Brazil was Etienne Brasil, arriving in Rio de Janeiro in 1907 for a brief stay. Born in the Ottoman Empire in 1882, Brasil moved to France for his university education and was later ordained as a Catholic priest and obtained degrees in pharmacy and philosophy. He was believed to be a nephew of Paul Petros XIII Terzian, Armenian Catholic Patriarch of Cilicia from 1910 to 1931. After his initial visit, he relocated to Salvador, Bahia, around 1908, residing there for approximately a year before returning to Rio de Janeiro. During the period of the Armenian genocide, he became a notable columnist in the Brazilian press, where he denounced the persecution of Armenians and other Christian communities in the Ottoman Empire. Following the independence of the First Republic of Armenia in 1918, Brasil served as a diplomatic representative in South America, contributing to the recognition of Armenia by several countries in the region and promoting humanitarian support for Armenian refugees. Following the Red Army invasion of Armenia, he turned his attention to his legal career and ceased public involvement in Armenian affairs until his death in 1955.

A second wave of Armenian immigration occurred in the 1920s, particularly between 1924 and 1926. By 1935, the Armenian population in Brazil was estimated at 5,000 individuals. These immigrants were largely genocide survivors fleeing persecution in the Ottoman Empire. The majority of these immigrants settled in the state of São Paulo, especially in cities such as São Paulo proper, Osasco, and the district of Presidente Altino, while others relocated to Rio de Janeiro and additional regions. Lacking financial resources, many were supported by earlier Armenian settlers and community leaders. Organizations such as the Conselho dos Quarenta ("Council of Forty") and individuals like Riskallah Jorge, owner of Casa da Boia, provided temporary accommodation and material assistance.

== Geographic distribution ==
The Armenian population in Brazil is estimated at 40,000 people. Armenians in Brazil are primarily concentrated in the southeastern region of the country, with the largest communities located in the state of São Paulo. Other significant populations reside in Rio de Janeiro, Brasília, and various other states.

São Paulo is the principal center of the Armenian diaspora in Brazil. The city is home to multiple Armenian churches, including the St. Gregory the Illuminator Armenian Catholic Church, which became the official seat of the Armenian Catholic Apostolic Exarchate of Latin America in 2015. Armenian Apostolic, Evangelical, and Armenian Brotherhood churches are also present, particularly in the Bom Retiro district, a historic hub for Armenian settlers.

== Notable Armenian Brazilians ==
- Aracy Balabanian – actress;
- Comendador Levy Gasparian – businessman;
- Ricardo Tacuchian – composer and conductor;
- Pedro Pedrossian – politician and civil engineer;
- Fiuk (Filipe Kartalian) – singer, composer, actor and model;
- Stepan Nercessian – actor and politician;
- Antonio Kandir – mechanical and production engineer, economist, university teacher and politician;
- Jacob Bazarian - philosopher, writer and university professor;
- Daniel Sarafian – MMA fighter;
- Ricardo Tacuchian – composer;
- Marcelo Djian – former soccer player;
- Sergio Kafejian – composer;
- Fábio Mahseredjian – personal trainer;
- Vahan Agopyan – civil engineer and rector of University of São Paulo;
- Krikor Mekhitarian – chess player;
- Armenia Nercessian de Oliveira - UN official and co-founder of Novica
- Marcos Pizzelli – professional soccer player;
- Mihran Latif-Latifyan – engineer;
- Fernando Gasparian – politician;

== See also ==
- Armenia–Brazil relations
- Armenian diaspora
- Immigration to Brazil

== Bibliography ==
- Bogossian-Porto, Pedro (2018). "Accounts of a Genocide: Collective memory among Armenians in Brazil". Haigazian Armenological Review. 38. ISSN 2518-9697.
- Bogossian-Porto, Pedro; Bogossian, Thi (3 April 2023). "The school is not enough: the role of non-formal educational spaces in preserving Armenian identity in the diasporic community". International Studies in Sociology of Education. 32 (2): 215–238. doi:10.1080/09620214.2021.1912632. ISSN 0962-0214.
- Grün, Roberto (July 1996). "The Armenian Renaissance in Brazil". The Americas. 53 (1): 113–151. doi:10.2307/1007476. ISSN 0003-1615. JSTOR 1007476. S2CID 143656550.
- Loureiro, Heitor (22 December 2017). "The Armenians in Brazil and the Genocide in Diaspora". Revista Hades. 1 (1): 1–8. doi:10.34024/hades.2017.v1.7968. ISSN 2594-6870.
- Loureiro, Heitor; Scandolara, Daniel (28 April 2023). "Armenian Catholics in Brazil". Revista de Cultura Teológica. 31 (104): 264–283. doi:10.23925/rct.i104.58612. hdl:11449/245289. ISSN 2317-4307.
- Marcarian, Mônica Nalbandian (2 February 2016). "Diáspora armênia no Brasil". Revista de Estudos Orientais (6): 109–115. doi:10.11606/issn.2763-650X.i6p109-115. ISSN 2763-650X.
- Melo, Alessandra de (19 September 2011). A Imigração Armênia no Brasil [Armenian immigration to Brazil]. Congresso Internacional de História (in Portuguese). doi:10.4025/5cih.pphuem.0201. ISSN 2175-4446.
- Melyan, Kristine (2023). "Արգենտինայի և Բրազիլիայի հայ մամուլը" [The Armenian press of Argentina and Brazil]. Bulletin of Armenian Libraries (in Armenian): 157–161. doi:10.52027/18294685-mka2023.sp. ISSN 1829-4685.
