= Cardinal Antonelli =

Cardinal Antonelli may refer to:

- Giacomo Antonelli (1806–1876), Italian cardinal deacon
- Ferdinando Giuseppe Antonelli (1896–1993), Italian Cardinal of the Catholic Church
- Ennio Antonelli (born 1936), Italian Cardinal of the Roman Catholic Church
