= Sapiens =

Sapiens, a Latin word meaning "one who knows", may refer to:

== People ==
- Berengarius Sapiens, a designation for Berengar the Wise, count of Toulouse (814-835) and duke of Septimania (832-835)
- Cato the Elder (234 BC–149 BC), known by the cognomen Sapiens; a Roman statesman
- Cenn Fáelad mac Aillila (died 679), referred to sapiens; an Irish scholar
- Gaius Laelius Sapiens (c. 188 BC-?), a Roman statesman
- Gildas Sapiens, a designation for Saint Gildas (c. 500–570), a 6th-century British cleric

== Fiction ==
- Felis sapiens (also Felix sapiens), a fictional, sentient, humanoid species from the Red Dwarf television series
- Icthyo sapiens is a species designation given to at least two fictional characters:
  - The Mariner, played by Kevin Costner in the sci-fi film Waterworld
  - Abe Sapien, a fictional character in the Hellboy comic book series

== Other ==
- Homo sapiens, the scientific name for humans
- Hydro Sapiens, an art performance performed by The Lunatics from the Netherlands
- Robo-Sapiens, the debut album by Malibu
- Sapiens International Corporation, a computer software company
- Sapiens: A Brief History of Humankind, 2014 book by Yuval Harari
- Vipera Sapiens, an EP by Brazilian heavy metal band Viper
- We the Sapiens, a voluntary organisation affiliated to Humanist International and Atheist Alliance International
- Sapiens (magazine), an online anthropology magazine
- Sapiens (video game), a 1986 video game

== See also ==
- Sapience
- Sapient (disambiguation)
- Sapienza (disambiguation)
