= Sapienza (disambiguation) =

Sapienza (Italian for 'Knowledge' or 'Wisdom') is the name of a university in Rome, Italy.

Sapienza may also refer to:

== Buildings ==
- Orto Botanico dell'Università di Roma "La Sapienza", a botanical garden operated by the Sapienza University of Rome, Italy
- San Pellegrino alla Sapienza, a Roman Catholic church in Siena, Italy
- Santa Maria della Sapienza, a Roman Catholic church in Naples, Italy
- Sant'Ivo alla Sapienza, a Roman Catholic church located within the premises of the Sapienza University of Rome, Italy

== Organizations ==
- Oratorio dell'Eterna Sapienza, a Renaissance confraternity in Milan, Italy
- University of Rome Unitelma Sapienza, a private university in Rome, Italy

== Places ==
- Sapientza or Sapienza, a Greek island located off the southern coast of the Peloponnese
  - Battle of Sapienza, a 1354 battle during the Third Venetian–Genoese War
  - Treaty of Sapienza, a 1209 treaty between the Republic of Venice and the Principality of Achaea

== People ==
- Al Sapienza, American actor
- Antonio Sapienza (1794–1855), Italian composer and conductor
- Dave Sapienza (born 1965), American stock car racing driver
- Goliarda Sapienza (1924–1996), Italian actress and writer
- Leonardo Sapienza (born 1952), Italian Catholic priest and author serving as regent of the Prefecture of the Papal Household
- Marie Sapienza, American politician
- Paola Sapienza, Italian-American economist
- Peggy Rae Sapienza (1944–2015), American science fiction fan and con-runner
- Rick Sapienza (born 1936), American football player
- Vincent Sapienza, American civil servant
- Vitor Sapienza (1933–2020), Brazilian politician and economist

== Other uses ==
- La Sapienza (film), a 2015 dramatic film directed by Eugène Green
- Romano & Sapienza, the previous name of Italian musical group Tacabro
- Sapienza (Hitman), a fictional town and level from the Hitman video game series

== See also ==
- Sapienz
- Sapientia (disambiguation)
