= Jacques-Paul Martin =

French Catholic cardinal (1908–1992)

His Eminence Jacques-Paul Martin
- Prefect Emeritus of the Papal Household
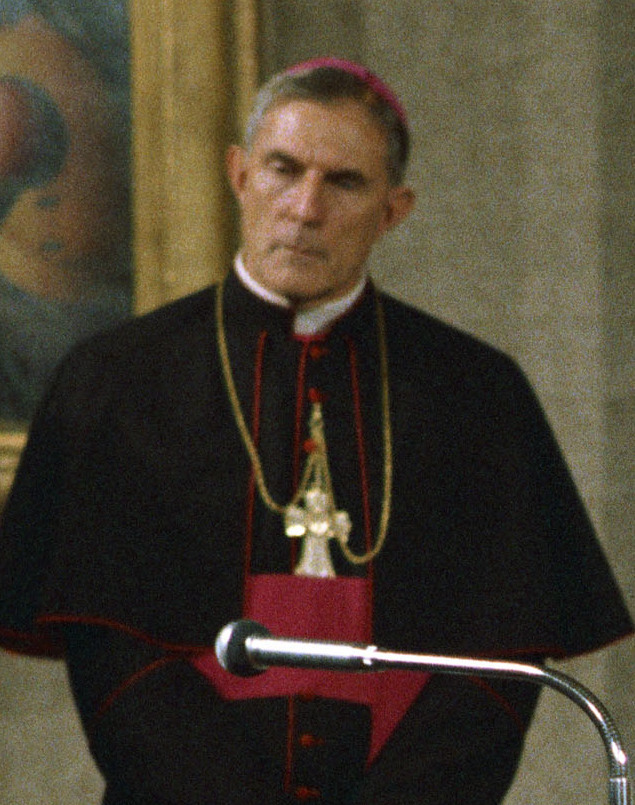
- Church: Roman Catholic Church
- Appointed: 9 April 1969
- Term ended: 18 December 1986
- Predecessor: Mario Nasalli Rocca di Corneliano
- Successor: Dino Monduzzi
- Other post: Cardinal-Deacon of Sacro Cuore di Cristo Re (1988–92)
- Previous posts: Titular Bishop of Neapolis in Palaestina (1964–86); Titular Archbishop of Neapolis in Palaestina (1986–88)

Orders
- Ordination: 14 October 1934 by Henri Friteau
- Consecration: 11 February 1964 by Paolo Marella
- Created cardinal: 28 June 1988 by Pope John Paul II
- Rank: Cardinal-Deacon

Personal details
- Born: Jacques-Paul Martin; 26 August 1908 Amiens, France
- Died: 27 September 1992 (aged 84) Vatican City
- Buried: Campo Verano (1992-97); Sacro Cuore di Cristo Re
- Education: University of Strasbourg; Pontifical Gregorian University; Pontifical Ecclesiastical Academy; Pontifical Lateran University
- Motto: Simpliciter et confidenter
- Coat of arms

Jacques-Paul Martin (26 August 1908 – 27 September 1992) was a French Roman Catholic cardinal, raised to the cardinalate in 1988.

== Education and progression through the Church ==
Martin received his education at the University of Strasbourg, where he obtained a licentiate in Letters. He attended the Pontifical Gregorian University from 1929 to 1936, where he earned a Doctorate in Theology; this followed his thesis "Le Louis XIV de Charteaux, Dom Innocent Le Masson" ("The Carthusian Louis XIV, Dom Innocent Le Masson").

Martin attended the Pontifical Ecclesiastical Academy in Rome between 1936 and 1938 and the Pontifical Lateran University, where he attained a Doctorate in Canon Law.

He was ordained on 14 October 1934, and studied further in Rome from 1934 to 1938. He joined the Vatican Secretariate of State in 1938. He was a member of the papal delegation to the 34th International Eucharistic Congress in Budapest (12 May 1938) and named Privy chamberlain supernumerary on 2 June 1941. He was named a Domestic Prelate of His Holiness on 20 June 1951, and a special envoy to the celebration of the Silver Jubilee of coronation of Haile Selassie I, emperor of Ethiopia in 1954. He was named Canon of the patriarchal Vatican basilica and protonotary apostolic supernumerary on 10 December 1958. He accompanied Paul VI on his pilgrimage to the Holy Land in January 1964.

He was elected titular bishop of Neapoli di Palestina on 5 January 1964, and consecrated on 11 February 1964 by Paolo Cardinal Marella, assisted by Angelo Dell'Acqua and Paul-Pierre Philippe.

Martin was appointed Prefect of the Papal Household on 9 April 1969. He was promoted to the personal Title of Archbishop and given the position of Prefect Emeritus on 18 December 1986. He was created Cardinal-Deacon of Sacro Cuore di Cristo Re in the consistory of 28 June 1988. He received the red biretta and the deaconry on the same day.

== Death ==
Martin died in the Vatican City on 27 September 1992, aged 84, following a severe heart attack. He was buried in the Chapel of the Canons of St. Peter's Basilica (inside the Campo Verano Cemetery of Rome), but was later transported to the Riconciliazione chapel inside the basilica of Sacro Cuore di Cristo Re in Rome on 2 December 1997.
