= San Giovanni Bosco in Via Tuscolana =

Catholic basilica in Rome

- Basilica di San Giovanni Bosco
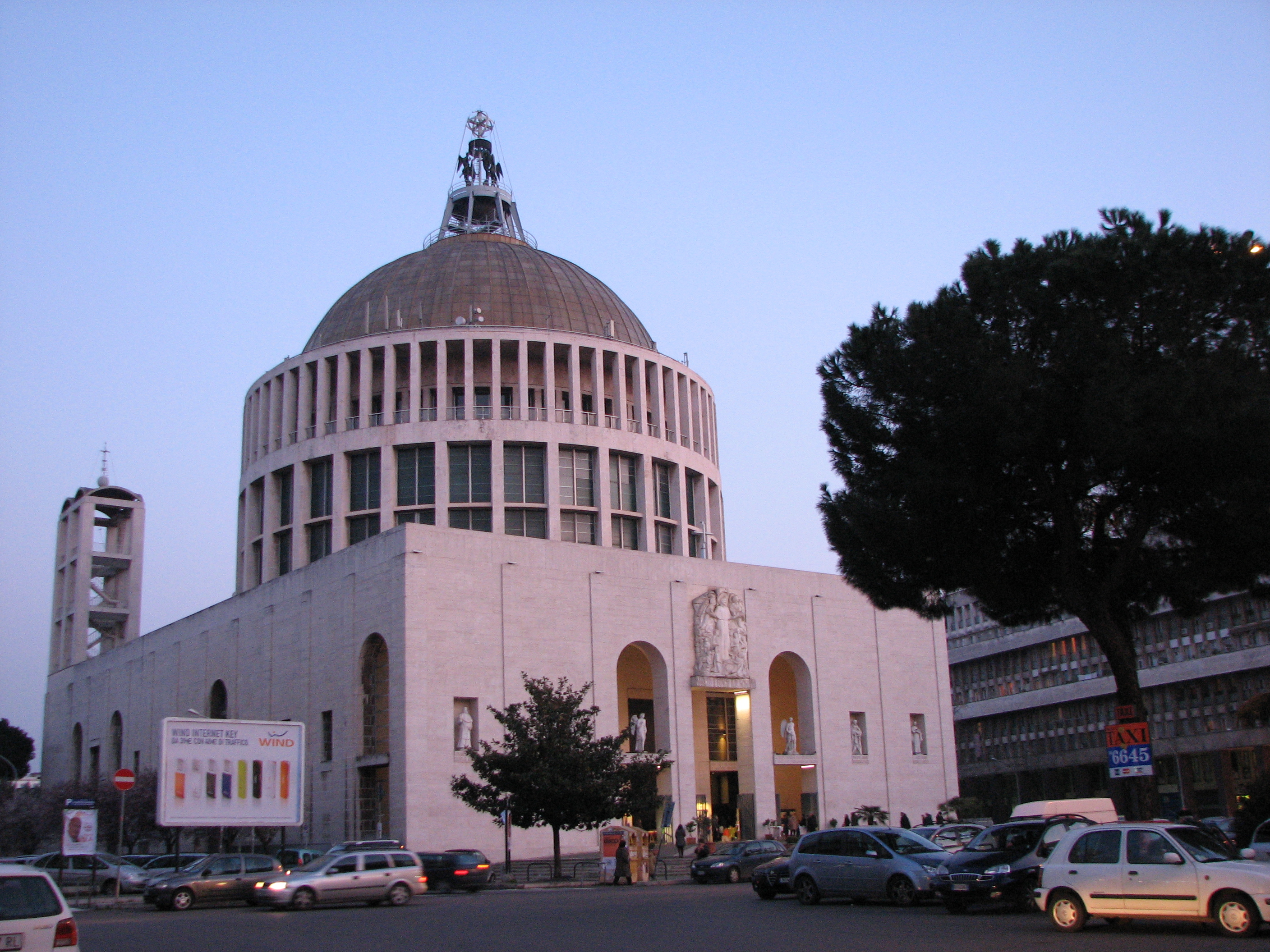
- Exterior of the church
- Click on the map for a fullscreen view
- 41.8588°N 12.5656°E
- Location: Viale dei Salesiani 9, Rome
- Country: Italy
- Denomination: Catholic Church
- Sui iuris church: Latin Church
- Religious institute: Salesians
- Website: www.parrocchiadonbosco.it

History
- Dedication: Saint John Bosco
- Dedicated: 2 May 1959

Architecture
- Style: Modern

Administration
- Diocese: Rome

The San Giovanni Bosco is a Catholic basilica in the Don Bosco quarter of Rome, situated between the via Tuscolana and Centocelle Airport. It is dedicated to Saint John Bosco.

On 5 February 1965, Pope Paul VI established this church as a deaconry under the name San Giovanni Bosco in Via Tuscolana. He gave it the status of a minor basilica on 20 November 1965.

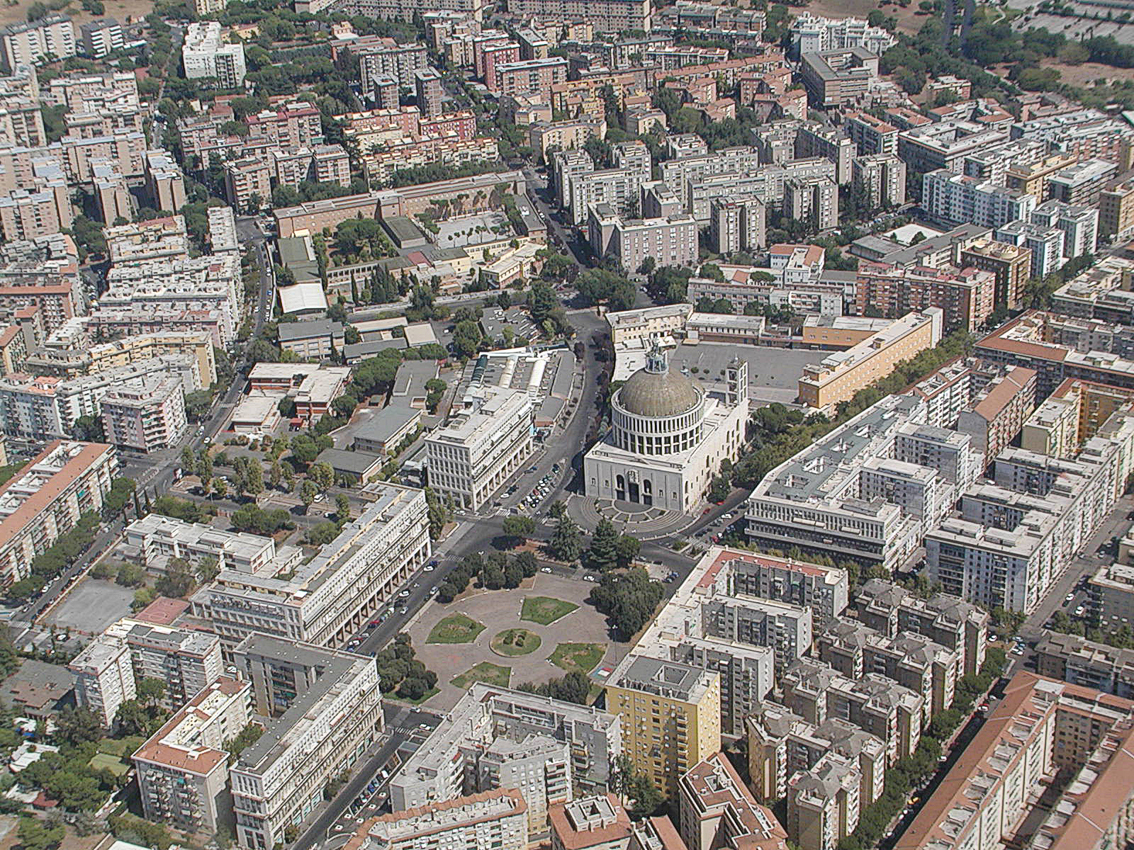
The basilica in its urban context

The church is a parish seat of the Diocese of Rome and has been entrusted to the care of the Salesian Fathers.

== History ==
The building was constructed at the beginning of the 1950s by the Sicilian architect Gaetano Rapisardi. On 12 September 1952 the first stone of the new building was laid by Clemente Micara, cardinal vicar of Rome. The church was inaugurated on 2 May 1959 by Benedetto Aloisi Masella, cardinal protector of the Salesians. Much of the interior remained unfinished until 1964. The day after the inauguration, Pope John XXIII visited to pray at the urn holding the remains of Don Bosco, which had been brought from Turin for the occasion.

== Cardinals who have held the title ==
- Federico Callori di Vignale (25 February 1965 - 10 August 1971)
- Štěpán Trochta, S.D.B., cardinal-priest pro hac vice (12 April 1973 - 6 April 1974)
- Boleslaw Filipiak (24 May 1976 - 14 October 1978)
- Egano Righi-Lambertini (30 June 1979 - 26 November 1990)
- Virgilio Noè (28 June 1991 - 26 February 2002))
- Stephen Fumio Hamao (21 October 2003 - 8 November 2007)
- Robert Sarah (20 November 2010 - present)
