= Edward Daniang Daleng =

Nigerian Catholic priest

The Reverend Edward Daleng OSA
- Vice Regent of the Prefecture of the Pontifical Household
- Church: Catholic Church
- Appointed: 10 November 2025

Orders
- Ordination: 10 September 2005

Personal details
- Born: 4 April 1977 (age 49) Yitla’ar, Kwalla, Plateau State, Nigeria
- Education: Pontifical Alphonsian Academy

Edward Daniang Daleng (born 4 April 1977) is a Nigerian Catholic priest of the Augustinians from Plateau State who is the current vice-regent of the Prefecture of the Papal Household under Pope Leo XIV since November 2025.

An alumnus of Pontifical Alphonsian Academy in Rome, Reverend Edward holds a doctorate degree in moral theology awarded in 2012.

Ordained in September 2005, he previously served as general counsellor and Procurator General of the Order of Saint Augustine. As procurator general, he was responsible for relations between the order and the Holy See.
