= San Sebastiano al Palatino =

- Sancti Sebastiani in Monte Palatino (in Latin)
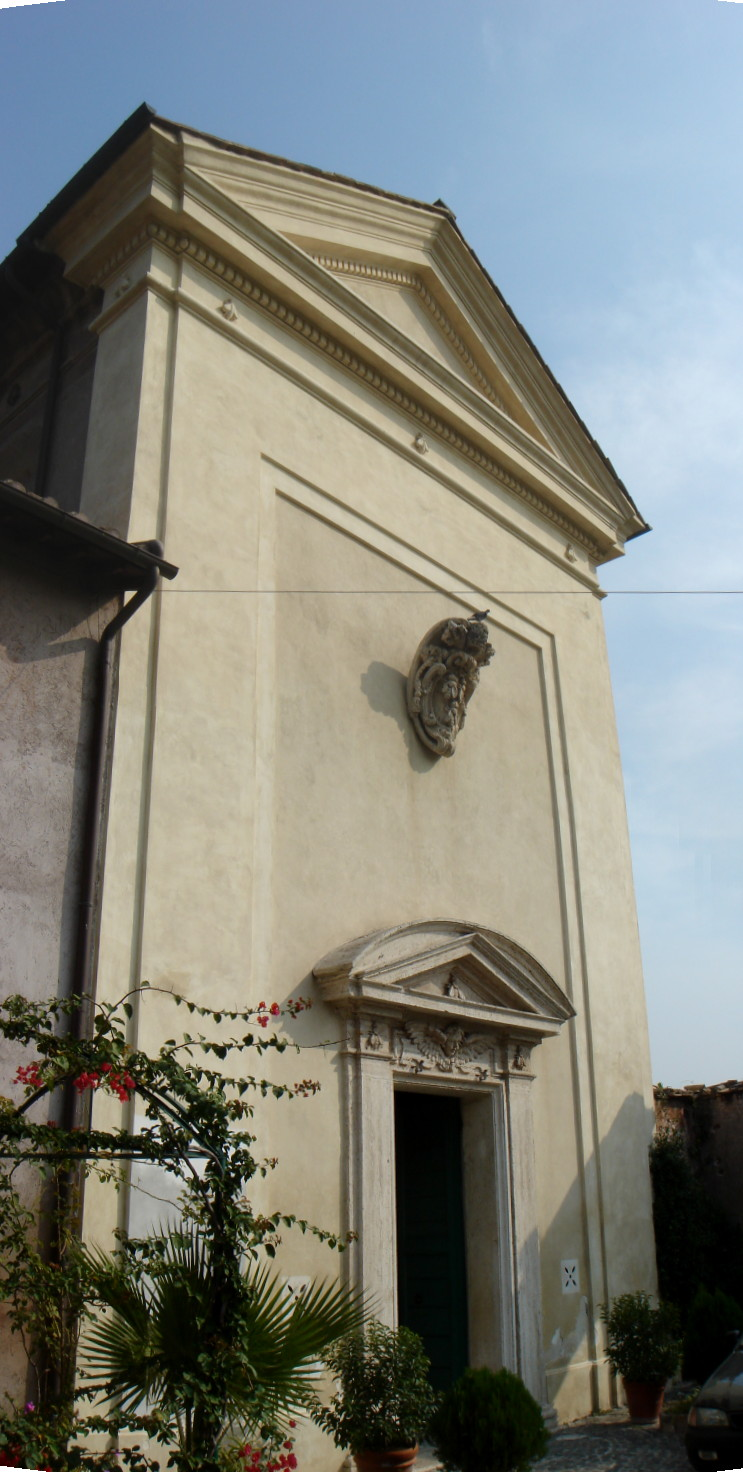
- The church
- Click on the map for a fullscreen view
- 41°53′22.84″N 12°29′19.14″E
- Location: Via di San Bonaventura, Rome
- Country: Italy
- Denomination: Catholic
- Tradition: Latin Church
- Website: Official website

History
- Status: Titular church
- Dedication: Saint Sebastian

Architecture
- Architectural type: Church
- Style: Baroque

Administration
- District: Lazio
- Province: Rome

San Sebastiano al Palatino is a church on the northeastern corner of the Palatine Hill in Rome. It is dedicated to Saint Sebastian, a late-third-century Christian martyr under the reign of Diocletian. According to legend, the church was built on the site of the saint's "first" martyrdom with arrows, which was unsuccessful.

== History and excavation ==
The medieval church is accessed from the Via Bonaventura, from the Forum. It sits on a rectangular terrace, 110 by 150 metres, whose brick substructure dates back to the reign of the final Flavian Emperor, Domitian. Excavations carried out at the beginning of the twentieth century revealed the concrete foundation of a peripteral temple, 60 metres long and 40 metres wide. It may be the remains of the unidentifiable Temple of Divus Augustus, which was dedicated in the first century CE and rebuilt by Domitian after it was destroyed in a fire. It may also be the temple built by the emperor Elagabalus in the third century.

The temple was replaced by a church and an attached monastery in the tenth century. It was dedicated to the Virgin Mary, Saint Sebastian, and Saint Zoticus, which can be read in an inscription that also contains the name of the founder of monastery, a physician named "Peter". Originally the church was known as Santa Maria in Pallara, after the Palladium, the ancient image of Athena from Troy which - along with some of the most sacred objects in pagan Rome - was allegedly kept in a pagan temple on the same site. In 1061, the church was given to the abbot of Montecassino. It was then dedicated to Saint Sebastian.

The structure that stands today is the result of a rebuilding in 1624 by the Barberini family, during the rule of Pope Urban VIII. It is the seat of a Bailiff of the Sovereign Military Order of Malta (currently Prince Urbano Barberini).

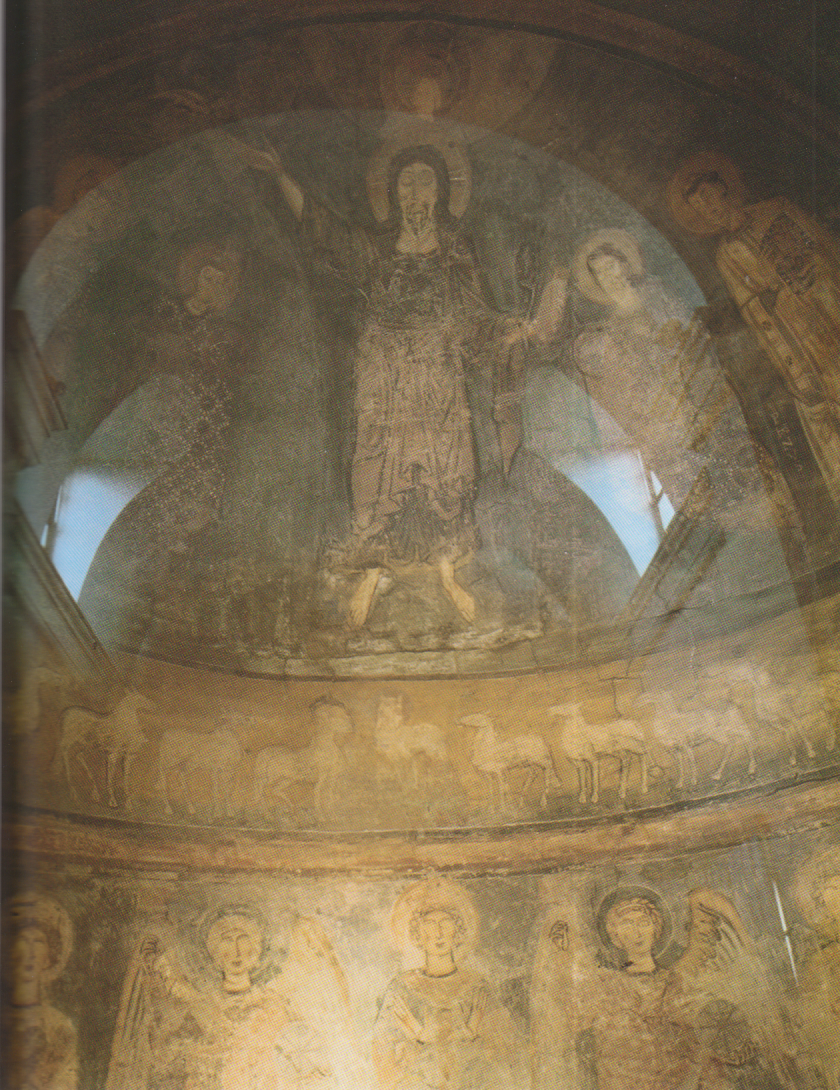
Detail of the fresco, with Jesus at the centre

== Decoration ==
The exterior of the church is relatively unadorned, and the same goes for most of the interior. The apse is decorated with the frescoes that were preserved from the tenth century renovation. The style of the artwork is typical of that employed by medieval Roman workshops. The apse conch is decorated with two registers; the top register contains the figure of Jesus flanked by four saints, Sebastian being on the left. The lower register contains the Virgin Mary, flanked by angels and female saints. The lowest part of the apse was altered and repainted with the busts of Saint Sebastian, Saint Benedict, and Saint Zoticus.

== Saint Sebastian ==
Saint Sebastian was a devout Christian who was educated in Milan. Because of his faithful military service and reliability, he was appointed as a leader of the praetorian guard. In this position, he was forced to conceal his Christian identity. In a community of Christians in Rome, Sebastian was responsible for converting several friends to Christianity, until they were all arrested and martyred; Sebastian was the final martyr. His sentence was one befitting a soldier of the praetorian guard, where he had to act as a target for bow-and-arrow practice. This did not kill him, and he was rescued by Saint Irene of Rome, who nursed him back to health. When he was able, he confronted the emperor Diocletian about his sins, namely the persecution of Christians. The emperor ordered him to be beaten to death, and thrown into the Cloaca Maxima. Sebastian's body was removed by another pious woman, Lucina, and he was buried in the catacombs at a church which would later be called San Sebastiano fuori le mura. He is buried near the tombs of Saint Peter and Saint Paul. His story was recorded in the 5th century.

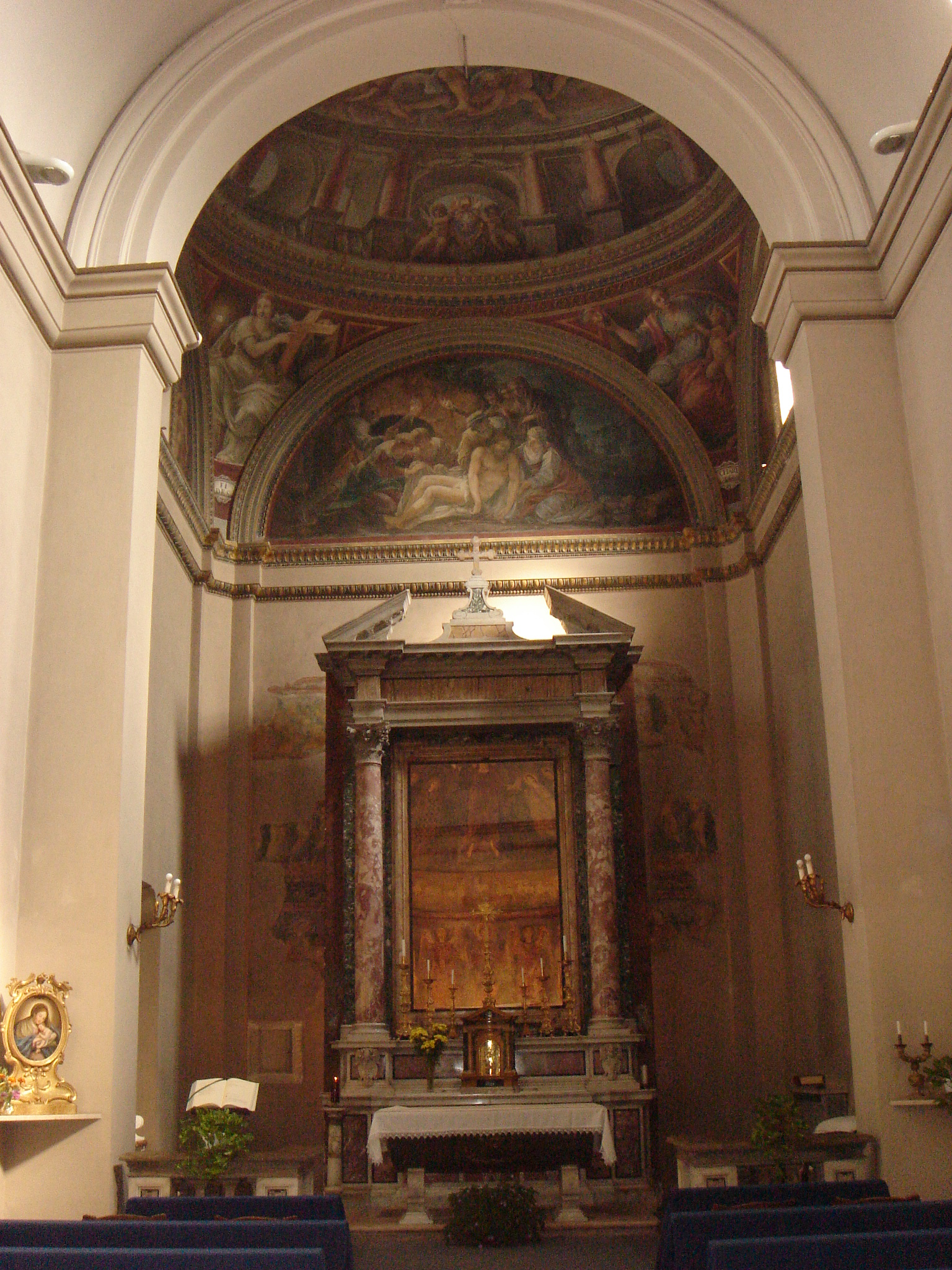
The interior of the church

== Titular church ==
On 5 March 1973, San Sebastiano al Palatino was established as a Cardinal titular church. American Cardinal Edwin Frederick O'Brien is the church's current Cardinal-Deacon, created on February 18, 2012, by Pope Benedict XVI at St. Peter's Basilica.

=== List of Cardinal-Deacons ===
- Edwin Frederick O'Brien (18 February 2012 – present)
- John Patrick Foley (24 November 2007 – 11 December 2011)
- Dino Monduzzi (21 February 1998 – 13 October 2006)
- Yves Marie-Joseph Congar (26 November 1994 – 22 June 1995)
- Ferdinando Giuseppe Antonelli (5 March 1973 – 12 July 1993)
