= Rolandas Makrickas =

Lithuanian Catholic cardinal (born 1972)

His Eminence Rolandas Makrickas
- Cardinal; Archpriest of the Basilica of Santa Maria Maggiore
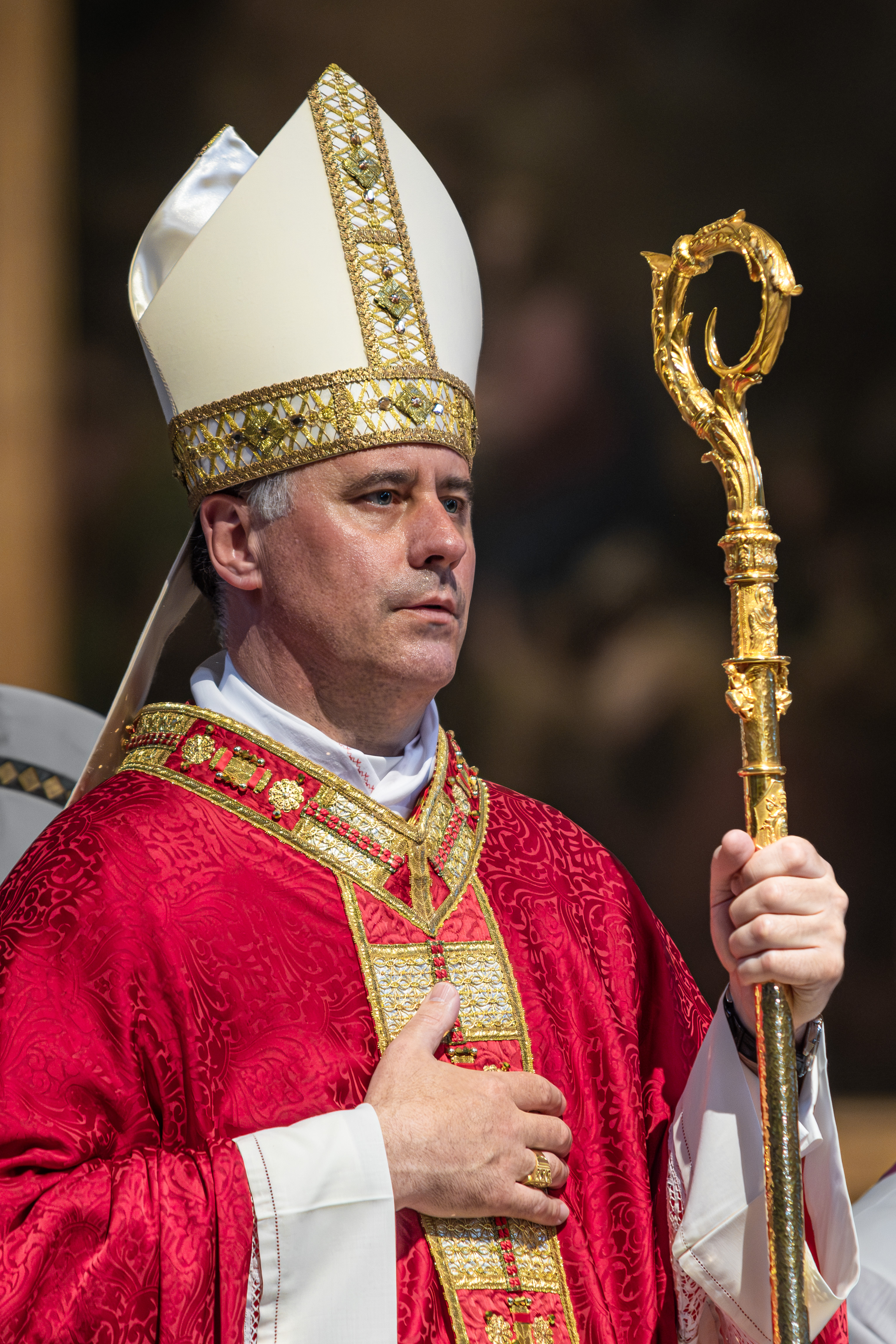
- Makrickas in 2025
- Appointed: 4 July 2025
- Predecessor: Stanisław Ryłko
- Other post: Cardinal-Deacon of Sant'Eustachio (2024–)
- Previous posts: Diplomat of the Holy See (2006–2019); Administrator, Secretariat of State (2019–2021); Coadjutor Archpriest of Santa Maria Maggiore (2023-2025); Titular Bishop of Tolentino (2023–2025)

Orders
- Ordination: 30 July 1996 by Juozas Preikšas
- Consecration: 15 April 2023 by Pietro Parolin
- Created cardinal: 7 December 2024 by Pope Francis
- Rank: Cardinal-Deacon

Personal details
- Born: 31 January 1972 (age 54) Biržai, Lithuanian SSR
- Motto: Deus fidelis manet (Latin for 'God remains faithful')
- Coat of arms

Rolandas Makrickas (born 31 January 1972) is a Lithuanian Catholic prelate serving as archpriest of the Basilica of Santa Maria Maggiore since 2025. He worked in the diplomatic service of the Holy See from 2006 to 2021, when he was given responsibility for reorganizing the administration of the basilica. He was granted the personal title of archbishop in 2023 and made a cardinal in 2024.

== Biography ==
=== Early life and education ===
Makrickas was born on 31 January 1972 in Biržai, in what was then the Lithuanian Soviet Socialist Republic, the youngest of five children. Because Soviet authorities restricted religious practice and catechesis, his early religious education was private and tersely accomplished. The end of the Soviet era allowed him to gain a more extensive understanding of his faith and ways of experiencing beyond ritual. While young, he flew gliders and briefly considered a career in aviation.

He entered Kaunas Priest Seminary in 1990, the second year it operated, and beginning in 1991 lived at the St. Casimir Lithuanian College in Rome while studying philosophy and theology at the Pontifical Gregorian University. He was ordained a priest of the Diocese of Panevėžys on 30 July 1996. From 1996 to 2001 he was under-secretary of the Lithuanian Bishops' Conference and headed the National Committee of the Great Jubilee of 2000. He earned a doctorate in church history at the Gregorian in 2004.

=== Diplomatic service ===
He studied at the Pontifical Ecclesiastical Academy from 2003 to 2006, and joined the diplomatic service of the Holy See on 1 July 2006 and fulfilled assignments first in Bolivia, in Georgia where he witnessed the destruction of the Russo-Georgian War, and in Sweden where the nunciature was responsible for several northern countries. He served in the United States from 2013 to 2017, which included a papal visit. For two years, he was chargé d'affaires in Gabon and counselor in Congo, where he joined in the Church's delivery of social services and managed a construction project.

On 10 August 2019, he joined the Section for General Affairs of the Secretariat of State in Rome as head of administration, the first non-Italian to hold that position. In that role he participated in the reorganization of the Vatican's financial and administrative functions.

=== Basilica of Santa Maria Maggiore ===
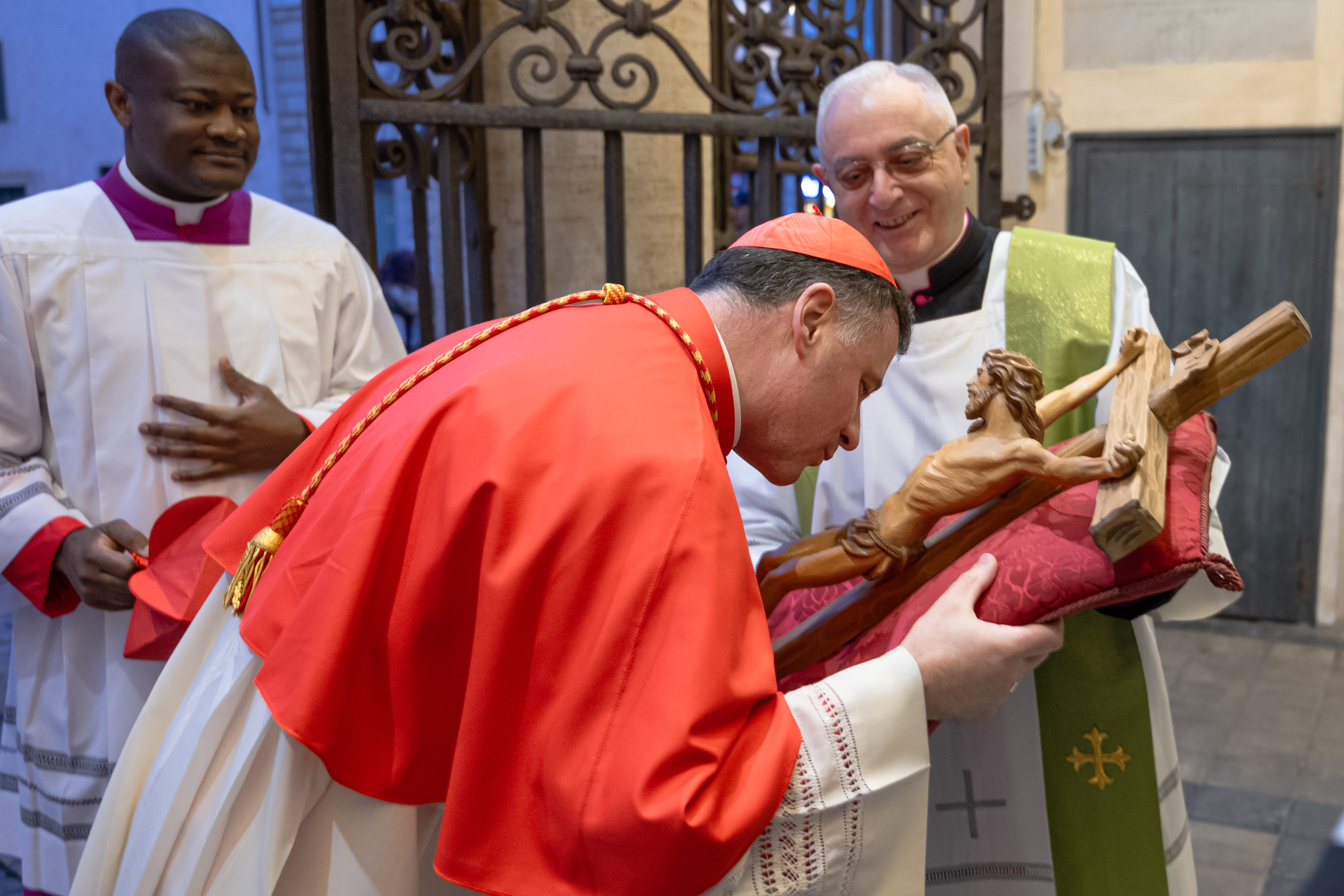
Cardinal Makrickas takes possession of the cardinal title of Sant'Eustachio

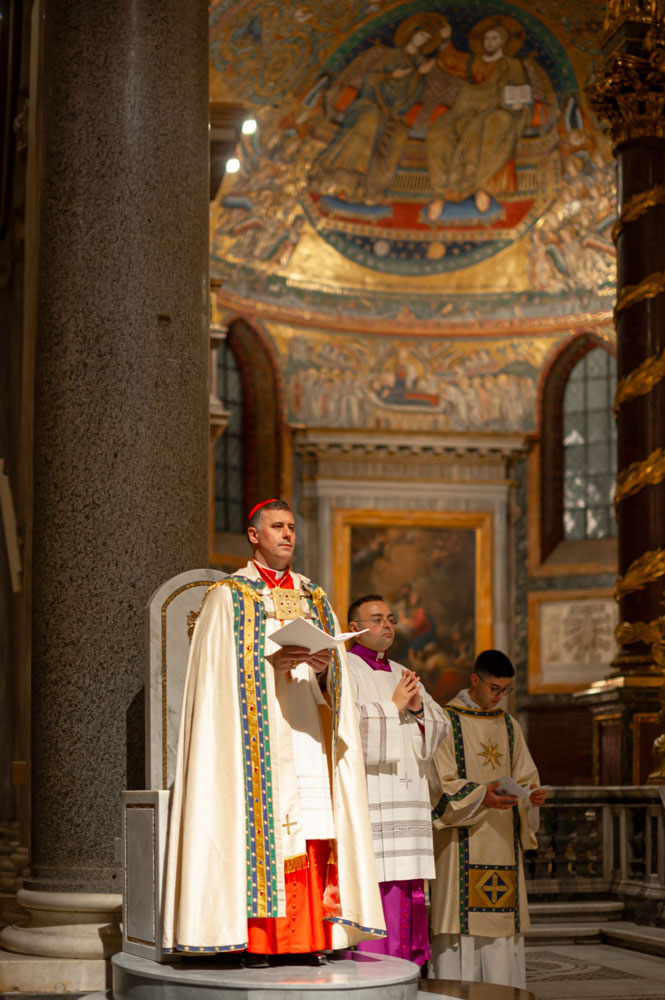
Cardinal Makrickas in 2025 presiding over Solemn Vespers.

On 15 December 2021, Pope Francis appointed him extraordinary commissioner with responsibility for managing the assets of the chapter of the Basilica of Santa Maria Maggiore, citing "the particular complexities of the economic and financial management of the Chapter ... exacerbated by the spread of the [COVID-19] pandemic". (Note: When Makrickas ended his work as commissioner, Pope Francis described his remit differently: "the task of reorganizing the life of the Chapter and the Basilica".) The pope left a meeting to offer him the post in a brief hallway conversation. Despite that characterization of his role, he repeatedly acted as spokesperson for the basilica's events and initiatives.

On 23 February 2023, the pope made him titular bishop of Tolentino with the personal title of archbishop. Makrickas received his episcopal consecration on 15 April from Cardinal Pietro Parolin, with co-consecrators Cardinal Stanisław Ryłko, Archpriest of Santa Maria Maggiore, and Archbishop Edgar Peña Parra.

On 20 March 2024, ending Makrickas' role as commissioner and redefining the role of the Basilica's canons, Pope Francis named him coadjutor archpriest of Santa Maria Maggiore.

Pope Francis announced on 6 October 2024 that he planned to make him a cardinal on 8 December, a date that was later changed to 7 December.

On 7 December 2024, Pope Francis made him a cardinal, creating him Cardinal-Deacon of Sant'Eustachio.

In 2024 in a new statutes that govern the Basilica, he removed the canons from all economic and administrative responsibilities with financial management transferred to a new Administrative Council. The Basilica's governance was divied into two with a new Delegate for Administration and a separate Delegate for Pastoral Care.

In February 2025, Makrickas visited Lithuania for the first time after becoming a cardinal and together with two other Lithuanian cardinals Audrys Bačkis and Sigitas Tamkevičius held a mass in the Vilnius Cathedral on 16 February, commemorating the Independence Day of Lithuania.

He was named in the Testament of Pope Francis as having been given the instructions for Francis' burial at Santa Maria Maggiore.

He participated as a cardinal elector in the 2025 papal conclave that elected Pope Leo XIV.

He succeeded as archpriest of Santa Maria Maggiore upon the 80th birthday of his predecessor, Cardinal Ryłko, on 4 July 2025.

== See also ==
- Catholic Church in Lithuania
- Cardinals created by Pope Francis

== Notes ==
Catholic Church titles
Preceded by Stanisław Ryłko	Archpriest of the Basilica of Santa Maria Maggiore; 4 July 2025 –	Incumbent
