= Mario Nasalli Rocca di Corneliano =

Italian cardinal

His Eminence Mario Nasalli Rocca di Corneliano
- Prefect Emeritus of the Apostolic Palace
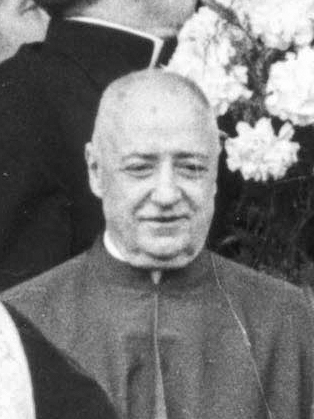
- Church: Roman Catholic Church
- Appointed: 1 April 1967
- Term ended: 9 April 1969
- Predecessor: Giovanni Tacci Porcelli
- Successor: Jacques-Paul Martin
- Other post: Cardinal-Priest of San Giovanni Battista Decollato "pro hac vice" (1979–88)
- Previous posts: Titular Archbishop of Anzio (1969); Cardinal-Priest of San Giovanni Battista Decollato (1969–79)

Orders
- Ordination: 9 April 1927
- Consecration: 20 April 1969 by Paolo Marella
- Created cardinal: 28 April 1969 by Pope Paul VI
- Rank: Cardinal-deacon (1969–79); Cardinal-priest (1979–88)

Personal details
- Born: Mario Nasalli Rocca di Corneliano; 12 August 1903 Piacenza, Kingdom of Italy
- Died: 9 November 1988 (aged 85) Rome, Italy
- Parents: Camillo Nasalli Rocca; Caterina Taffini d'Accegliano
- Education: Pontifical Roman Seminary; Pontifical Roman Athenaeum S. Apollinare; Pontifical Ecclesiastical Academy
- Motto: Ut turres
- Coat of arms

Styles of Mario Nasalli Rocca di Corneliano
- Reference style: His Eminence
- Spoken style: Your Eminence
- Informal style: Cardinal
- See: none

Mario Nasalli Rocca di Corneliano (12 August 1903 – 9 November 1988) was an Italian cardinal of the Catholic Church. He served as Prefect of the Apostolic Palace from 1967 until his death, and was elevated to the cardinalate in 1969.

== Biography ==
Nasalli Rocca di Corneliano was born in Piacenza to Count Camillo Nasalli Rocca and Marchioness Caterina Taffini d'Accegliano. His father died when Mario was a child, and his uncle was Giovanni Nasalli Rocca di Corneliano, who was later Archbishop of Bologna. Nasalli Rocca studied at the Pontifical Roman Seminary, Pontifical Roman Athenaeum S. Apollinare, and the Pontifical Ecclesiastical Academy before being ordained to the priesthood on 8 April 1927.

He then began pastoral work in Rome, and was made a canon of St. Peter's Basilica. After being raised to the rank of a Privy Chamberlain of His Holiness on 22 November 1931, he later became a Domestic Prelate of His Holiness on 1 July 1949. Pope John XXIII named Nasalli Rocca as Master of the Papal Chamber the day after his election, on 29 October 1958. Upon the death of John XXIII on 3 June 1963, Nasalli Rocca and all major Vatican officials, in accord with custom, automatically lost their positions during the sede vacante. He was later confirmed as the papal majordomo by Pope Paul VI on the following 21 June. He also became Prefect of the Apostolic Palace on 1 April 1967.

On 11 April 1969, Nasalli Rocca was appointed Titular Archbishop of Antium by Paul VI. He received his episcopal consecration on the following 20 April from Cardinal Paolo Marella, with Archbishop Diego Venini and Bishop Alberto Scola, serving as co-consecrators, in St. Peter's Basilica. Pope Paul later created Nasalli Rocca Cardinal-Deacon of S. Giovanni Battista Decollato in the consistory of 28 April of that same year. He was one of the cardinal electors who participated in the conclaves of August and October 1978, which selected Popes John Paul I and John Paul II respectively. After ten years' standing as a Cardinal-Deacon, Nasalli Rocca opted to become a cardinal priest, with the same titular church, on 30 June 1979. He then lost the right to participate any future conclaves upon reaching age 80 on 12 August 1983.

Cardinal Nasalli Rocca di Corneliano died in a Roman clinic, where he had been admitted a week earlier, at age 85. He is buried in his native Piacenza.

Catholic Church titles
Preceded by Federico Callori di Vignale	Prefect of the Apostolic Palace; 1967–1988	Succeeded by Jacques-Paul Martin
