= Sapient =

Sapient means to be able to reflect on memories, and or possessing wisdom and may refer to:

- Brian Sapient, co-founder of atheist activist group Rational Response Squad
- Publicis Sapient, a digital consulting firm

== See also ==
- Sapiens (disambiguation)
- Sapient pearwood, a magical plant in Terry Pratchett's Discworld universe; see The Luggage
- Sapientia (disambiguation)
- Sapiential Books, a subset of the books of the Hebrew Bible
