= Sacro Cuore di Cristo Re =

Church of Sacred Heart of Christ the King
- Chiesa del Sacro Cuore di Cristo Re (in Italian)
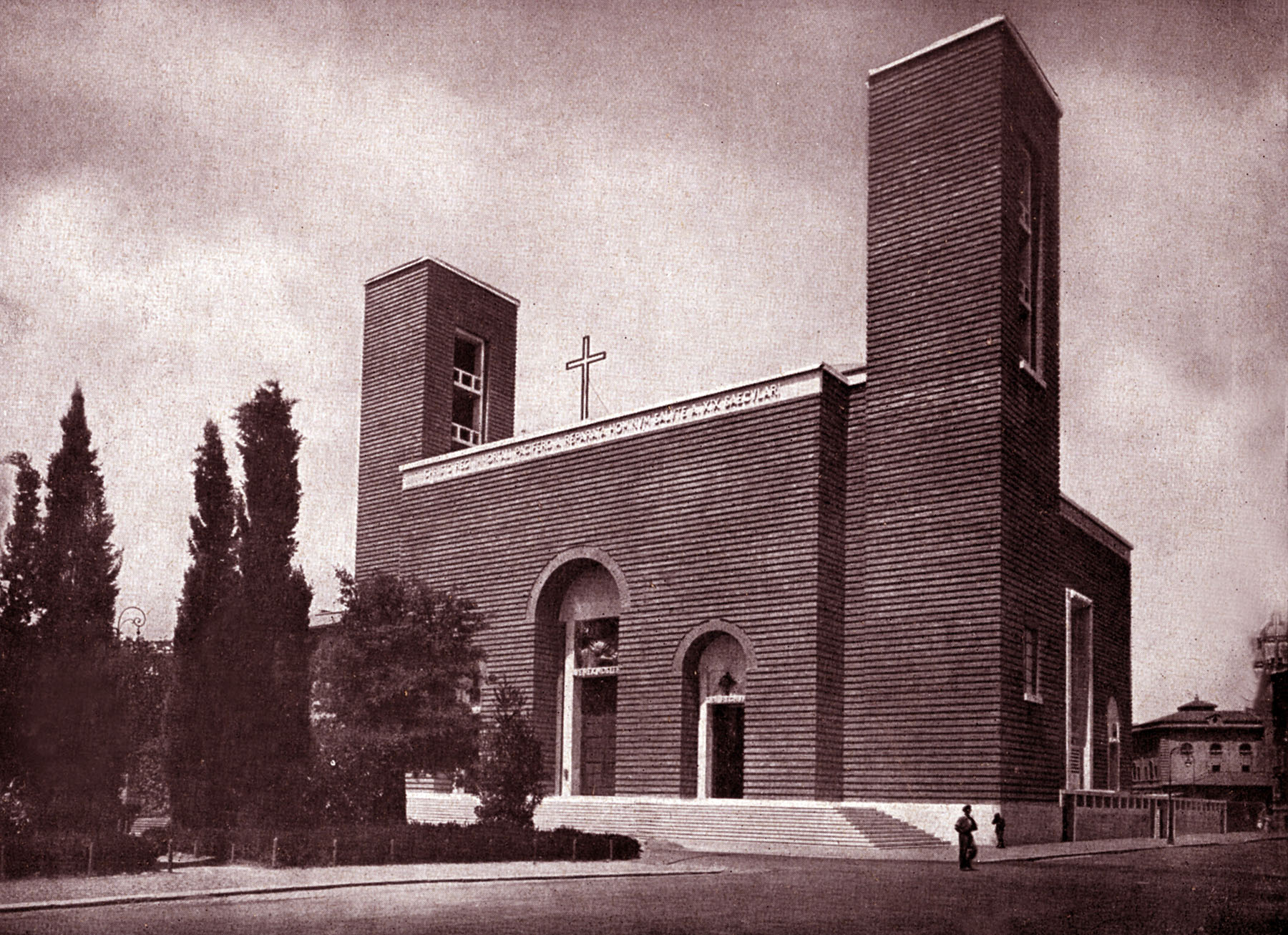
- Facade
- Click on the map for a fullscreen view
- 41°55′2.64″N 12°27′55.25″Eformat
- Location: Viale Giuseppe Mazzini 32, Rome
- Country: Italy
- Denomination: Roman Catholic
- Tradition: Roman Rite

History
- Status: Titular church, minor basilica
- Dedication: Sacred Heart

Architecture
- Architect: Marcello Piacentini
- Architectural type: Church
- Style: Italian rationalism
- Groundbreaking: 1920
- Completed: 1934

Sacro Cuore di Cristo Re is a Roman Catholic church (minor basilica) in Rome, designed between the 1920s and 1930s by Marcello Piacentini.

== History ==
The idea for a new church in the newly developed Quartiere della Vittoria (literally District of Victory, named for the victory in World War I) came from Ottavio Gasparri, member of the Sacred Heart of Jesus religious institute. At first the church was to be named Tempio della Pace, to remember and honour the fallen of World War I. Construction began in May 1920. The original design proposed by Marcello Piacentini was inspired by the churches built in Rome in the 16th century.

Construction halted with the death of Ottavio Gasparri, in 1929. In the next two years Piacentini changed radically the project, being inspired by the emerging Rationalist movement, and the Sacro Cuore di Gesù marked the turning point of the sacred architecture in Rome. The construction started again in 1931 and the church was inaugurated in 1934.

The church became a parish church under Pope Pius XI on 31 October 1926 with the apostolic constitution Regis pacifici. On 5 February 1965 was declared titular church by Pope Paul VI with the apostolic constitution Sacrum Cardinalium Collegium. Later that year, with the motu proprio Recentioris architecturae the church became a minor basilica.

== Design ==
The church has a brick façade with alternate courses raised and recessed; the façade is capped with travertine and the doors and windows are framed with the same material. The floor plan, with a central nave of approximately 70 metres in length and flanked by two aisles, is a hybrid of a Latin cross and a Greek cross. The hemispherical dome is 36 metres high and 20 metres in diameter. Over the main portal there is a high relief by Arturo Martini depicting the sacred heart of Jesus. Around the interior are the Stations of the Cross in bronze by Alfredo Biagini.

== Cardinal-Deacons ==
- Dino Staffa, title pro illa vice (June 29, 1967 – May 24, 1976, appointed Cardinal Priest of Santa Maria sopra Minerva)
- Bernardin Gantin (June 27, 1977 – September 29, 1986, appointed Cardinal Bishop of Palestrina)
- Jacques-Paul Martin (June 28, 1988 – September 27, 1992 deceased)
- Carlo Furno (November 26, 1994 – May 10, 2006, appointed Cardinal Priest of Sant'Onofrio)
- Stanisław Ryłko, (November 24, 2007 – present)

Preceded by Sacro Cuore di Maria	Landmarks of Rome; Sacro Cuore di Cristo Re	Succeeded by Sacro Cuore di Gesù a Castro Pretorio
