= Armenia–Brazil relations =

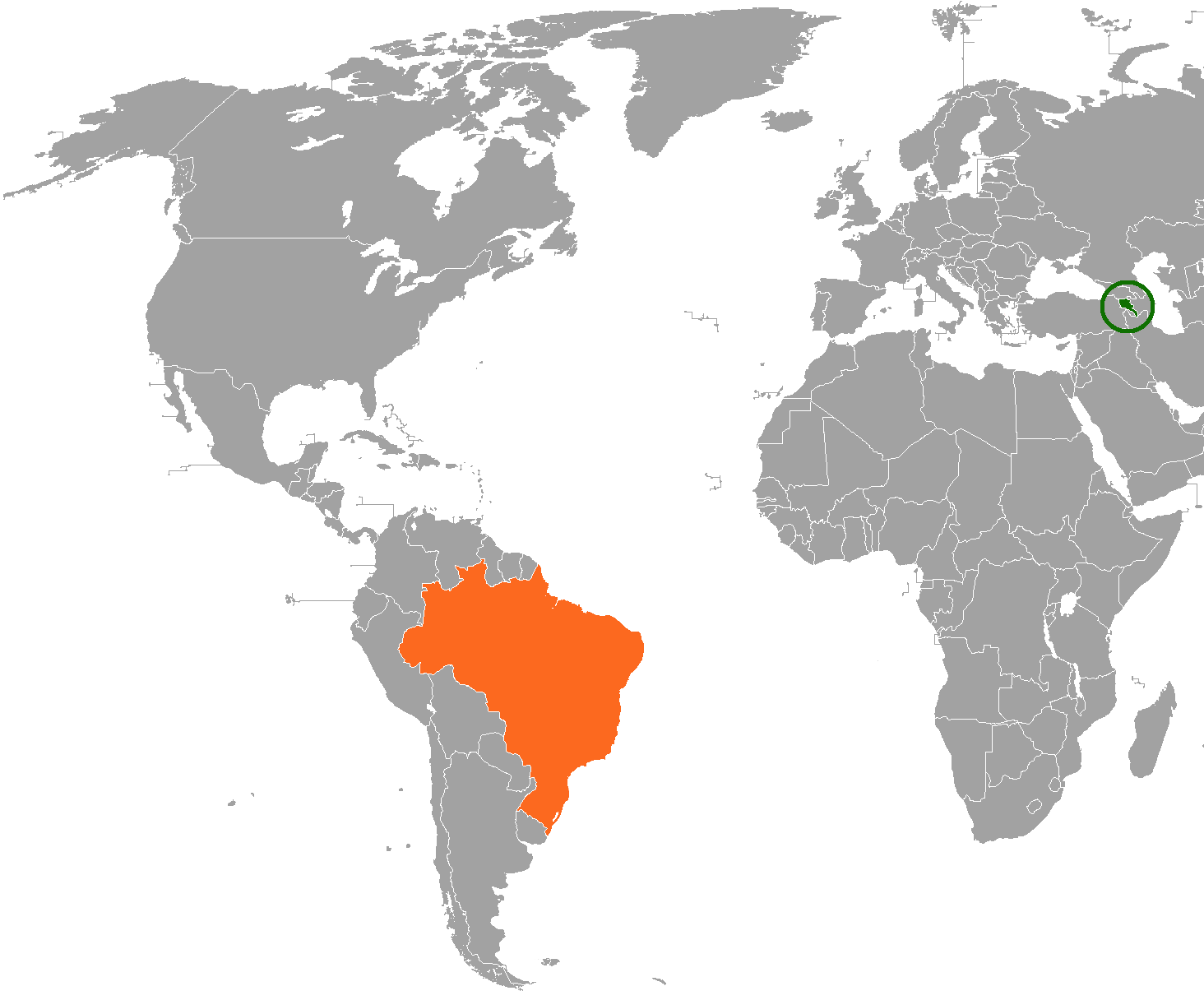

- Armenia: Brazil

Relations between Armenia and Brazil, have existed for decades. The Armenian community in Brazil is the second largest in Latin America (after Argentina) totaling approximately 100,000 members. Armenia has an embassy in Brasília and Brazil has an embassy in Yerevan.

== History ==
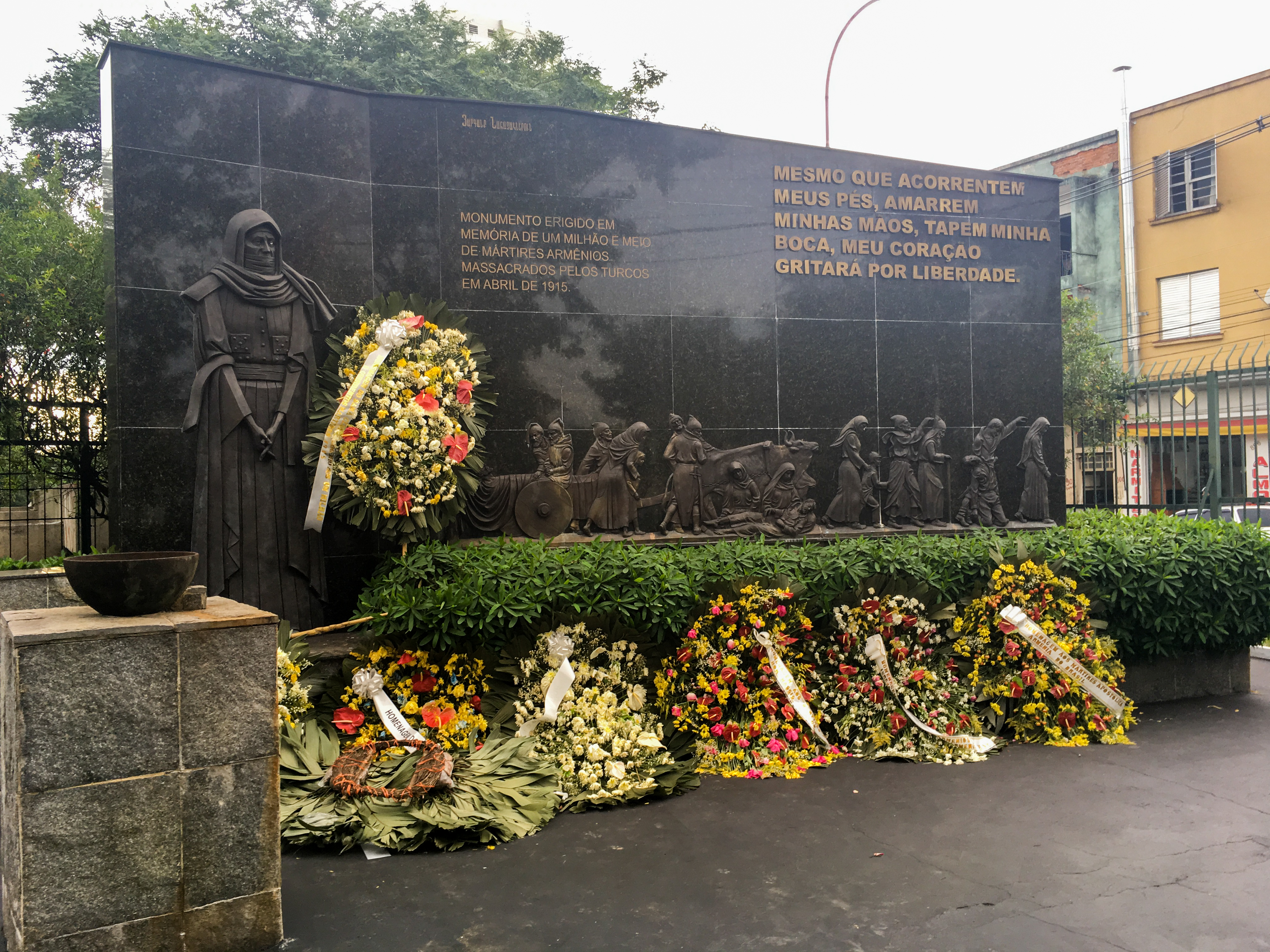
Monument to the victims of the Armenian genocide in São Paulo, Brazil

The first Armenians arrived in Brazil in the late 1800s. The biggest wave of migration to Brazil took place in the 1920s when several thousands Armenians came to Brazil (mainly from Lebanon and Syria) many having survived the Armenian genocide which was carried out by the Ottoman Empire. Most Armenians settled in the São Paulo area. On 26 December 1991, Armenia restored its independence after the Dissolution of the Soviet Union.

In December 1991, Armenian Foreign Minister, Raffi Hovhannissian visited Brazil to pave the way for establishing diplomatic relations between both nations. On 17 February 1992, Armenia and Brazil officially established diplomatic relations. In June 1992, Armenian President Levon Ter-Petrosyan paid an official visit to Brazil. In 1998, Armenia opened a consulate-general in São Paulo. In 2006, Brazil opened an embassy in Yerevan. In 2011, Armenia opened an embassy in Brasília, after which the Armenian consulate-general in São Paulo was transformed into an honorary consulate.

== Armenian genocide recognition ==
In 2015, the Brazilian Federal Senate recognized the Armenian genocide.

== High-level visits ==
High-level visits from Armenia to Brazil

- Foreign Minister Raffi Hovhannissian (1991)
- President Levon Ter-Petrosyan (1992)
- President Robert Kocharyan (2002)
- President Serzh Sargsyan (2016)
- Foreign Minister Edward Nalbandian (2016)

High-level visits from Brazil to Armenia

- Foreign Minister Aloysio Nunes (2017)

== Bilateral relations ==
Armenia and Brazil have signed a few bilateral agreements since the establishment of diplomatic relations between both nations in 1992, such as an Agreement on Cultural Cooperation (2002) and an Agreement for the establishment of visa free regime with respect to diplomatic and service passports holders (2002).

In 1985, the city of São Paulo named a metro station after Armenia. In 2003, a square in downtown Yerevan, capital of Armenia, was named after Brazil.

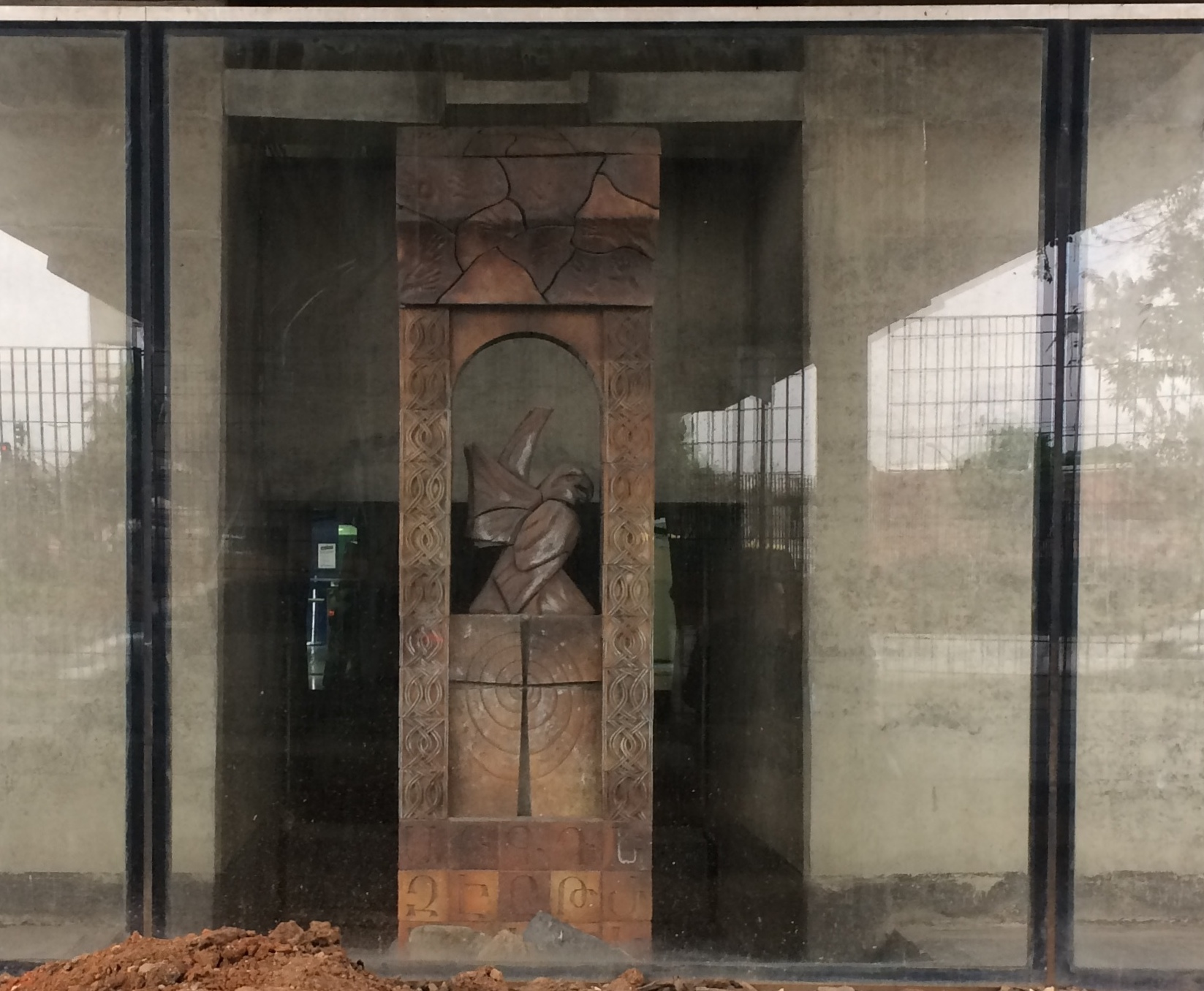
Armenian memorial in the Armênia station of São Paulo Metro

== Resident diplomatic missions ==
- Armenia has an embassy in Brasília.
- Brazil has an embassy in Yerevan.
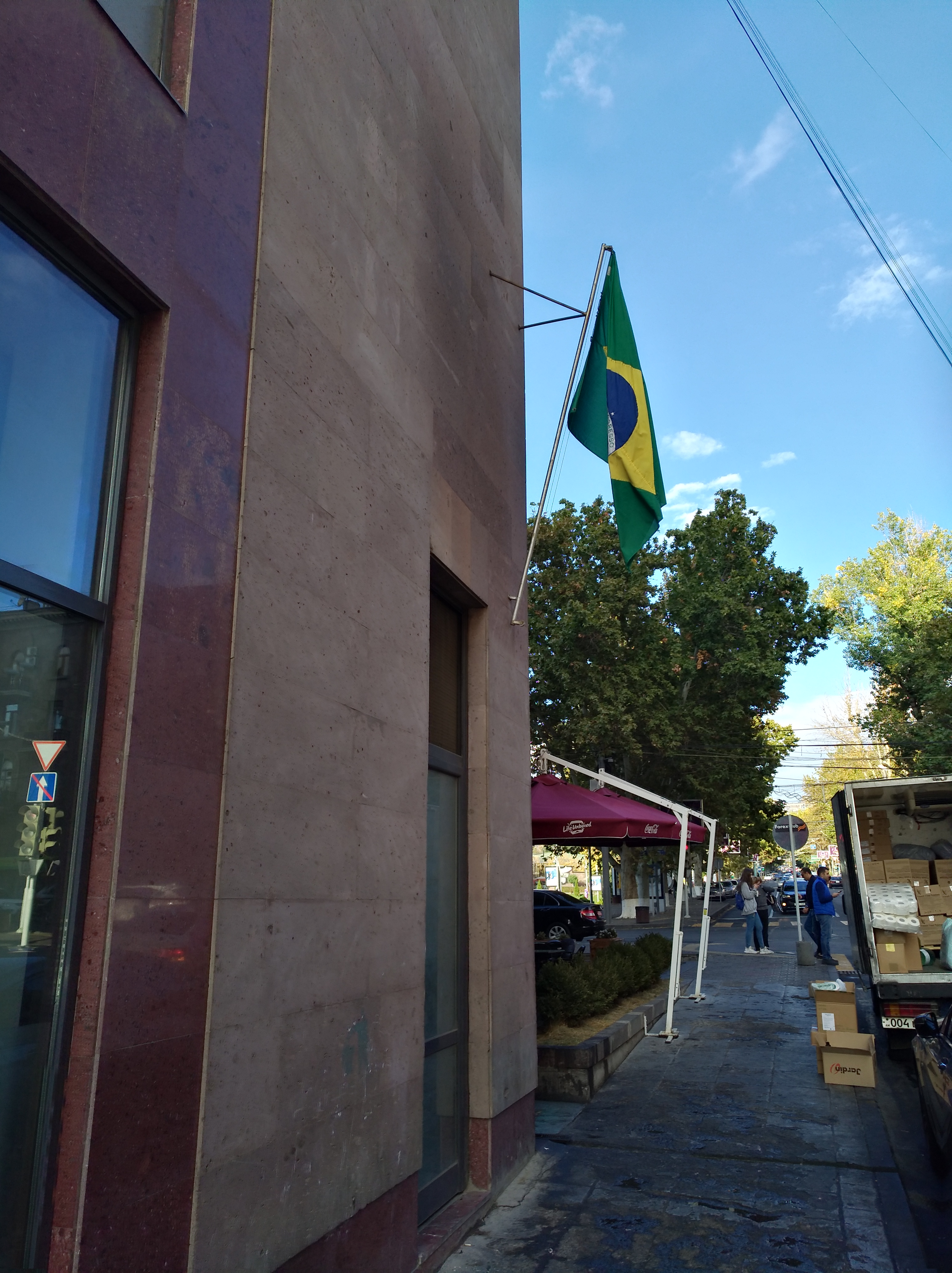
Embassy of Brazil in Yerevan

== See also ==
- Foreign relations of Armenia
- Foreign relations of Brazil
- Armenian genocide recognition
- Armenian Brazilians
- Armênia (São Paulo Metro)
