= Leonardo Sapienza =

Italian Roman-Catholic priest and writer

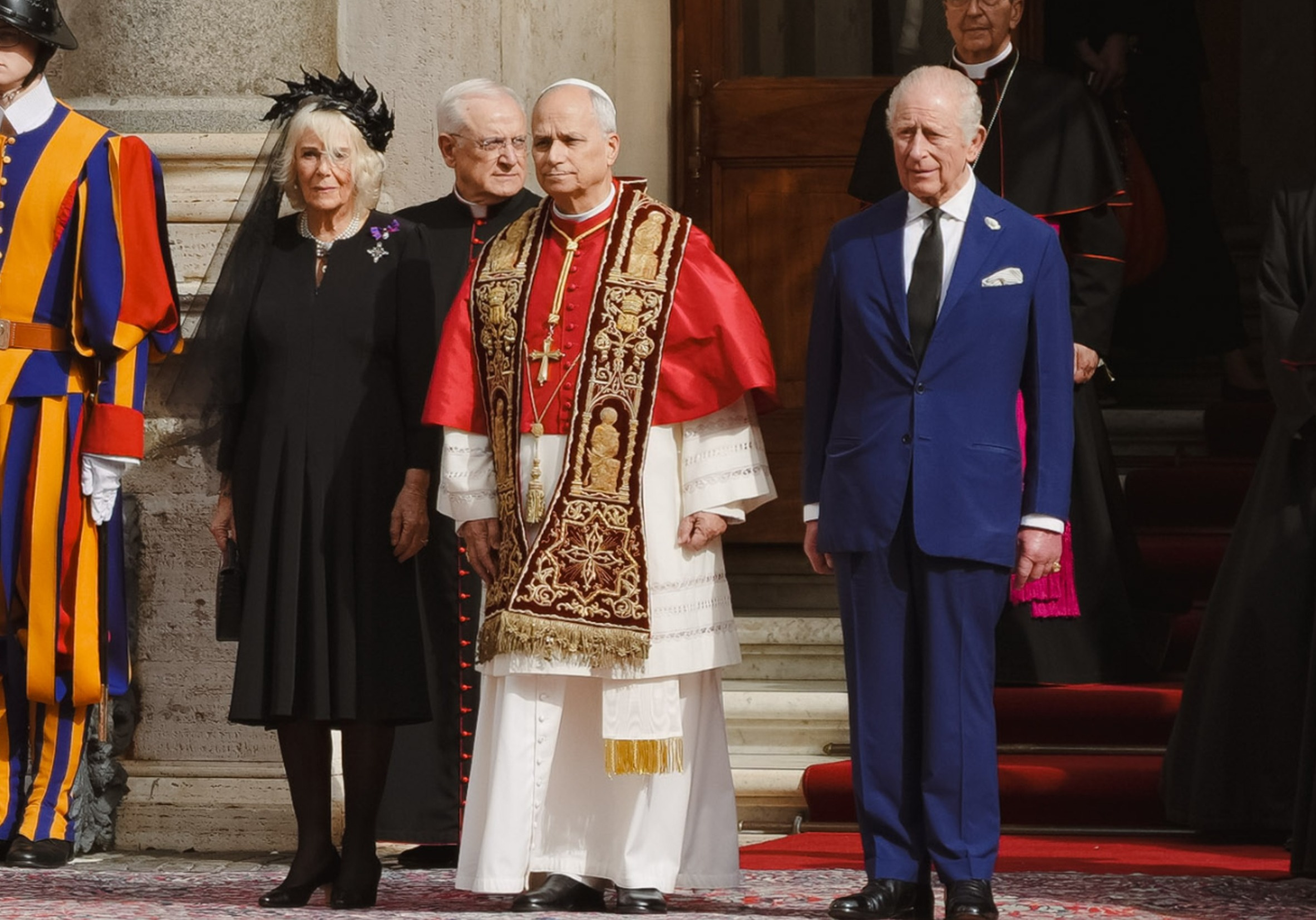
Sapienza behind Pope Leo XIV during the reception of King Charles at the Vatican, 2025

Leonardo Sapienza, RCJ (born 18 November 1952) is an Italian Catholic priest and author. Having joined the Rogationists in 1969 and been ordained a priest in 1978, he worked as a protocol officer within the Vatican. He has served as regent of the Prefecture of the Papal Household since 4 August 2012. As second in command of the Prefecture of the Papal Household, he was acting prefect from 2020 until 2026; this covered both Georg Gänswein's leave of absence from the role and the official vacancy before the appointment of Petar Rajič.

In February 2012, he was made a Protonotary Apostolic de numero by Pope Benedict XVI.

Sapienza has written a number of books on Pope Paul VI.

== Selected works ==
- Sapienza, Leonardo (2012). Paolo VI e la fede. Vatican City: Libreria Editrice Vaticana. ISBN 978-8820987466.
- Sapienza, Leonardo (2018). La barca di Paolo. Cinisello Balsamo (Milano): San Paolo Edizioni. ISBN 978-8892215054.
- Sapienza, Leonardo, ed. (2025). L'anno santo con Paolo VI. Città del Vaticano: Libreria editrice Vaticana. ISBN 978-8826609614.
