= Dino Monduzzi =

Roman Catholic cardinal (1922–2006)

His Eminence Dino Monduzzi
- Cardinal-Deacon of San Sebastiano al Palatino
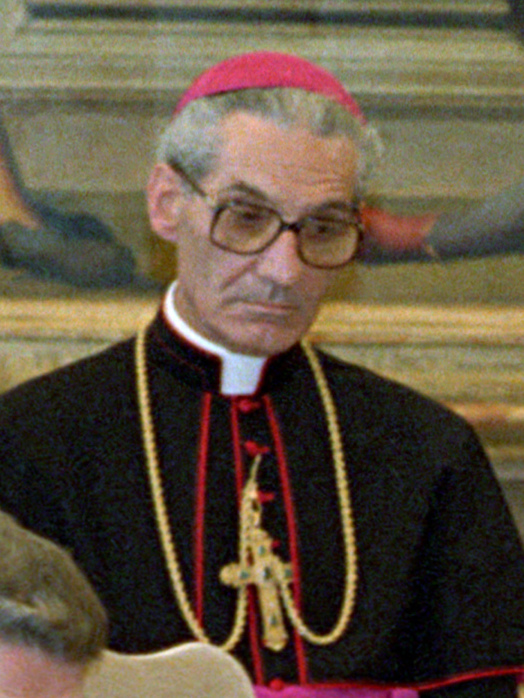
- Church: Roman Catholic Church
- Appointed: 21 February 1998
- Installed: 18 April 1998
- Term ended: 13 October 2006
- Predecessor: Yves-Marie-Joseph Congar
- Successor: John Patrick Foley
- Previous posts: Regent of the Prefecture of the Papal Household (1969–86); Prefect of the Prefecture of the Papal Household (1986–98); Titular Bishop of Capri (1986–98)

Orders
- Ordination: 22 July 1945 by Giuseppe Battaglia
- Consecration: 6 January 1987 by Pope John Paul II
- Created cardinal: 21 February 1998 by Pope John Paul II
- Rank: Cardinal-Deacon

Personal details
- Born: Dino Monduzzi; 2 April 1922 Brisighella, Kingdom of Italy
- Died: 13 October 2006 (aged 84) Vatican City
- Parents: Secondo Damiano Monduzzi; Ida Ragazzini
- Education: Pontifical Lateran University
- Motto: Patientiam praeficere caritati
- Coat of arms

Styles of Dino Monduzzi
- Reference style: His Eminence
- Spoken style: Your Eminence
- Informal style: Cardinal
- See: Capreae (titular)

Dino Monduzzi, ComC, GCIH, ComIH (2 April 1922 – 13 October 2006) was an Italian prelate of the Catholic Church. He was Prefect of the Prefecture of the Papal Household from 1986 to 1998.

== Biography ==
He was born in 1922 to Damiano and Ida (née Ragazzini) Monduzzi in Brisighella, Italy. Monduzzi was ordained to the priesthood by Bishop Giuseppe Battaglia of Faenza on 22 July 1945. He celebrated his first Mass the next day, and after this studies at the Pontifical Lateran University in Rome earning a licentiate in utroque iure.

After involvement in Catholic Action missions, Father Monduzzi began work for the Holy See in the late 1950s as an adjunct (and later secretary) in the Prefecture of the Papal Household, which among other duties arranges papal audiences. In 1961 he was elevated to the rank of monsignor. Monduzzi was named prefect of the Papal Household and titular bishop of Capreae on 18 December 1986, and received his episcopal consecration on 6 January 1987, from Pope John Paul II (with Archbishops Eduardo Martínez Somalo and José Tomás Sánchez as co-consecrators). As Prefect, Monduzzi was responsible for the non-liturgical aspects of papal ceremonies, and the public and private audiences of the pope. He accompanied John Paul II on 130 pastoral pilgrimages and 268 pastoral visits to Roman parishes.

On 7 February 1998, he retired as Prefect of the Papal Household, and was created cardinal-deacon of San Sebastiano al Palatino by John Paul II in the consistory of 21 February 1998. Cardinal Monduzzi finally succumbed to an ongoing illness and died at 1:00 am on 13 October 2006 at the Vatican. Pope Benedict XVI celebrated his funeral Mass on the following 16 October and his remains were then buried in his family tomb in Brisighella.

== Honours ==
- Commander of the Order of Prince Henry, Portugal (31 August 1967)
- Grand Officer of the Order of Merit of the Italian Republic, Italy (22 September 1972)
- Commander of the Order of Christ, Portugal (9 September 1981)
- Grand Cross of the Order of Prince Henry, Portugal (21 December 1990)
- Knight Grand Cross of the Order of Merit of the Italian Republic, Italy (27 November 1992)
- Knight Grand Cross of the Order of Isabella the Catholic, Spain (14 April 1997)
