= Carlo Furno =

Italian cardinal

His Eminence Carlo Furno
- Grand Master Emeritus of the Order of the Holy Sepulchre
- Church: Roman Catholic Church
- Appointed: 21 December 1995
- Term ended: 27 June 2007
- Predecessor: Giuseppe Caprio
- Successor: John Patrick Foley
- Other post: Cardinal-Priest of Sant'Onofrio (2006–15)
- Previous posts: Apostolic Nuncio to Peru (1973–78); Titular Archbishop of Abari (1973–94); Apostolic Nuncio to Lebanon (1978–82); Apostolic Nuncio to Brazil (1982–92); Apostolic Nuncio to Italy (1992–94); Cardinal-Deacon of Sacro Cuore di Cristo Re (1994–2005); Pontifical Legate for the Basilica of Saint Francis of Assisi (1996–98); Archpriest for the Basilica di Santa Maria Maggiore (1997–2004); Cardinal-Priest of Sacro Cuore di Cristo Re "pro hac vice" (2005–06)

Orders
- Ordination: 25 June 1944 by Paolo Rostagno
- Consecration: 16 September 1973 by Paolo Bertoli
- Created cardinal: 26 November 1994 by Pope John Paul II
- Rank: Cardinal-Deacon (1994–2005); Cardinal-Priest (2006–15)

Personal details
- Born: Carlo Furno; 2 December 1921 Bairo, Kingdom of Italy
- Died: 9 December 2015 (aged 94) Agostino Gemelli University Polyclinic, Rome, Italy
- Education: Pontifical Roman Major Seminary; Pontifical Ecclesiastical Academy
- Motto: Ardere et lucere
- Coat of arms

Styles of Carlo Furno
- Reference style: His Eminence
- Spoken style: Your Eminence
- Informal style: Cardinal

Carlo Furno (2 December 1921 – 9 December 2015) was an Italian cardinal of the Catholic Church.

== Early life and career ==
Furno was born in Bairo, Piedmont, in 1921. He was educated at the diocesan College at Ivrea and later at the Seminary of Ivrea, where he studied philosophy and theology. He was sent to the Theological Faculty, Crocetto Salesian Athenaeum in Turin, (1948–1949) and later the Pontifical Roman Seminary, Rome where he took a doctorate in utroque iure, both canon and civil law, (1953). Furno was summoned to the elite Pontifical Ecclesiastical Academy, Rome from 1951 to 1953 where he took practical courses in diplomacy. After his priestly ordination on 25 June 1944 and six years of pastoral work in his home diocese, he began a career in the diplomatic service of the Holy See.

He worked in a subordinate role in Colombia, Ecuador and Jerusalem, and then in the Secretariat of State. Following these assignments and episcopal consecration on 16 September 1973, he served as Apostolic Nuncio (Papal Ambassador) successively to Peru, Lebanon, Brazil and Italy.

== Cardinal ==
He was created Cardinal-Deacon of Sacro Cuore di Cristo Re on 26 November 1994. After ten years, he opted to become Cardinal Priest of that church. From 2005 until his death in late 2015, he was Cardinal-Priest of Sant'Onofrio, in recognition that the church is the Order's headquarters after the 15 August 1948, motu proprio of Pius XII establishing that the Order's headquarters should be transferred from Jerusalem to Rome. Pope John Paul II appointed him Grand Master of the Equestrian Order of the Holy Sepulchre of Jerusalem on 16 December 1995. The aforementioned Order, like the Knights of Malta, is a member of many international bodies and has observer status at others (such as the United Nations).

Cardinal Furno resigned this office in June 2007 and was succeeded by American Archbishop John Patrick Foley, who had been serving as the President of the Pontifical Council for Social Communications, an important department of the Roman Curia.

Cardinal Furno died on 9 December 2015, at the age of 94.

Catholic Church titles
Preceded by Carmine Rocco	Apostolic Nuncio to Brazil; 21 August 1982 – 15 April 1992	Succeeded by Alfio Rapisarda
Preceded by Luigi Poggi	Apostolic Nuncio to Italy and San Marino; 15 April 1992 – 26 November 1994	Succeeded by Francesco Colasuonno
Preceded by Ugo Poletti	Archpriest of the Basilica di Santa Maria Maggiore; 29 September 1997 – 27 May 2004	Succeeded by Bernard Francis Cardinal Law
Preceded by Giuseppe Caprio	Grand Master of the Equestrian Order of the Holy Sepulchre of Jerusalem; 21 December 1995 – 27 June 2007	Succeeded by John Patrick Foley
