= Prefecture of the Papal Household =

Office in charge of the Papal Household

The Prefecture of the Papal Household (Prefettura della Casa Pontificia) is the office in charge of the Papal Household, a section of the Roman Curia containing the Papal Chapel (Cappella Pontificia) and the Papal Family (Familia Pontificia).

The position of prefect has been held by Archbishop Petar Rajič since 30 March 2026.

== Functions ==
According to the Vatican:

It is the task of the Prefecture of the Papal Household to coordinate the services of the Antechamber and to organize the official audiences granted by His Holiness to Heads of State, Heads of Government, Governmental Ministers and other dignitaries, as well as to Ambassadors who come to the Vatican to present their Letters of Credence.

The Prefecture takes care of the preparations for all audiences – private, special and general – and visits from those who are formally received by the Holy Father. It is also responsible for arranging Pontifical ceremonies – except liturgical celebrations – as well as the Spiritual Retreat of the Holy Father, the College of Cardinals and the Roman Curia.

In addition, the Prefecture oversees the appropriate arrangements required each time the Holy Father leaves the Apostolic Palace to visit the city of Rome or travel within Italy.

Created by the 1967 reforms of Pope Paul VI, the Prefecture has competence for matters that once belonged to several offices that have been suppressed: the Ceremonial Congregation, the offices of the Majordomo, the Master of the Chamber, and the Master of the Sacred Apostolic Palaces, and the Heraldic Commission for the Papal Court.

It is headed by a Prefect, assisted by a Regent, each of whom serves for a term of five years.

The Prefecture runs the Apostolic Palace, containing the Papal Apartments, and the Villa Barberini in the town of Castel Gandolfo.

== Papal Chapel and Papal Family ==
The Papal Chapel has a membership that includes the Cardinals, the Patriarchs, the Archbishops who head departments of the Roman Curia, and the secretaries of the Congregations.

The Papal Family has lay members as well as clergy. Among the ecclesiastics who have membership are other high officials of the Roman Curia, but also all apostolic protonotaries, Honorary Prelates and Chaplains of His Holiness, while the lay members include all Gentlemen of His Holiness, the Commandant of the Papal Swiss Guard and the Counsellors of the State of Vatican City.

The Papal Family includes among its members the Theologian of the Pontifical Household, since 2005 Father Wojciech Giertych, and the Preacher to the Papal Household, Roberto Pasolini, OFMCap since 2024.

The Papal Family also includes those who look after the Pope's daily household affairs, such as those who actually keep house and cook for him, including those who may act as his butler.

== List of Prefects of the Papal Household ==
Prefecture of the Papal Household
Pope		Prefects		Regents	
Name	Term	Name	Term	Name	Term
Paul VI	1963–1978	Mario Nasalli Rocca di Corneliano	1968–1969	Vacant (1958–1969)	
Paul VI	1963–1978	Jacques-Paul Martin	1969–1986	Dino Monduzzi	1969–1986
John Paul I	1978	Jacques-Paul Martin	1969–1986	Dino Monduzzi	1969–1986
John Paul II	1978–2005	Jacques-Paul Martin	1969–1986	Dino Monduzzi	1969–1986
John Paul II	1978–2005	Dino Monduzzi	1986–1998	Vacant (1986–1991)	
John Paul II	1978–2005	Dino Monduzzi	1986–1998	Leonardo Sandri	1991–1992
John Paul II	1978–2005	Dino Monduzzi	1986–1998	Vacant (1992–1994)	
John Paul II	1978–2005	Dino Monduzzi	1986–1998	Paolo De Nicolò	1994–2012
John Paul II	1978–2005	James Harvey	1998–2012	Paolo De Nicolò	1994–2012
Benedict XVI	2005–2013	James Harvey	1998–2012	Paolo De Nicolò	1994–2012
Benedict XVI	2005–2013	Georg Gänswein	2012–2023	Leonardo Sapienza	2012–present
Francis	2013–2025	Georg Gänswein	2012–2023	Leonardo Sapienza	2012–present
Francis	2013–2025	Vacant	2023–2026	Leonardo Sapienza	2012–present
Leo XIV	2025–present	Vacant	2023–2026	Leonardo Sapienza	2012–present
Leo XIV	2025–present	Petar Rajič	2026–present	Leonardo Sapienza	2012–present

In addition:

- Stanisław Dziwisz; adjunct prefect 1998–2005
- Edward Daniang Daleng; vice-regent 2025–present

== See also ==
- Hereditary officers of the Roman Curia
- Index of Vatican City-related articles
