= Ferdinando Giuseppe Antonelli =

Catholic cardinal (1896–1993)

His Eminence Ferdinando Giuseppe Antonelli O.F.M.
- Secretary Emeritus of the Congregation for the Causes of Saints
- Church: Roman Catholic Church
- Appointed: 7 May 1969
- Term ended: 2 February 1973
- Successor: Giuseppe Casoria
- Other post: Cardinal-Priest of San Sebastiano al Palatino "pro hac vice" (1983–1993)
- Previous posts: Secretary of the Congregation of Rites (1965–1969); Titular Archbishop of Idicra (1966–1973); Cardinal-Deacon of San Sebastiano al Palatino (1973–1983)

Orders
- Ordination: 25 July 1922
- Consecration: 19 March 1966 by Pope Paul VI
- Created cardinal: 5 March 1973 by Pope Paul VI
- Rank: Cardinal-deacon (1973–1983); Cardinal-priest (1983–1993)

Personal details
- Born: Ferdinando Giuseppe Antonelli; 14 July 1896 Subbiano, Kingdom of Italy
- Died: 12 July 1993 (aged 96) Rome, Italy
- Education: Pontifical University Antonianum; Pontifical Academy of Archaeology
- Motto: Bonum facere et laetari

Styles of Ferdinando Giuseppe Antonelli
- Reference style: His Eminence
- Spoken style: Your Eminence
- Informal style: Cardinal
- See: None

Ferdinando Giuseppe Antonelli O.F.M. (14 July 1896 – 12 July 1993) was an Italian Roman Catholic cardinal. He was the last living cardinal to have been born in the 19th century. At the Time of his death he was the Oldest Member of the College of Cardinals.

== Biography ==
Born in Subbiano, Italy, Antonelli joined the Order of Friars Minor in Florence in 1909, becoming a Professed Member of the Order of Friars Minor in April 1914. He served in the Italian military during World War I. On 25 July 1922, he was ordained a Priest of the Order of Friars Minor. In 1965, Antonelli was appointed secretary of the Sacred Congregation of Rites. Antonelli was a faculty member of the Pontifical Antonianum Athenaeum, Rome, from 1928 to 1965, was Rector Magnifico from 1937 to 1943, and 1953 to 1959. He was the General Definitor of his order from 1939 to 1945. Antonelli attended the Vatican Council II from 1962 to 1965 as an expert.

On 19 February 1966, he was appointed Titular Archbishop of Idicra and was consecrated on 9 March 1966. On 7 May 1969, Antonelli was appointed secretary of the Congregation for the Causes of Saints, and on 5 March 1973, he was elevated to Cardinal-Deacon of San Sebastiano al Palatino, on the same day resigning as secretary of the Congregation for the Causes of Saints.

He was appointed Cardinal-Priest of San Sebastiano al Palatino on 2 February 1983. He died in Rome age nearly 97 in 1993. He was buried in La Pietà chapel in the Franciscan shrine of La Verna.

Records
Preceded by Henri de Lubac	Oldest living Member of the Sacred College; 4 September 1991 – 12 July 1993	Succeeded by Ignatius Kung Pin-Mei
