= Sapientia (disambiguation) =

Sapientia is the personification of wisdom in several religions.

Sapientia may also refer to:

- 275 Sapientia, a very large Main belt asteroid
- Sancta Sapientia or Hagia Sophia, Istanbul, Turkey
- Sapientia University, Transylvania, Romania
- Sapientia University (Japan), now named St. Thomas University in Amagasaki, Hyogo, Japan
- O Sapientia (O Wisdom), one of the O Antiphons (chants) in Western Christian tradition
- The great desk of the Chief Master at King Edward's School, Birmingham

== See also ==
- Sapient (disambiguation)
- Several Latin phrases, mostly school mottoes
