= Novica =

E-commerce website

- Industry: E-commerce
- Founded: 1999
- Founder: Roberto Milk; Andy Milk; Charles Hachtmann; Jose Cervantes; Armenia Nercessian de Oliveira; Michael Burns
- Headquarters: Santa Monica, CA, US
- Area served: Worldwide
- Website: novica.com

Novica is an e-commerce website that enables artisans to sell their handcrafted goods to customers worldwide. Partnered with the National Geographic Society, Novica shows handcrafted works of art, ranging from handmade jewelry to handmade apparel and world-style home decor.

== History ==
The idea behind Novica came to a group of co-founders at Stanford University in 1995 who collectively felt there must be a better way for artisans in developing nations to sell their goods to customers around the world. In 1995, Roberto Milk, went to Mina Olivera and her mother, Armenia Nercessian de Oliveira, a human rights officer with the United Nations Commission on Human Rights who was later featured in Elizabeth Gilbert’s novel Eat, Pray, Love. and together, they came up with the plan behind Novica, along with Milk’s brother, Andy Milk, childhood friend Charles Hachtmann, Stanford roommate Jose Cervantes. In 1999, supported by Michael Burns and other seed investors, they took up an office in Santa Monica, CA and launched the NOVICA.com website. By the end of 1999, they opened their first six regional centers located in Brazil, Peru, Mexico, Indonesia, Thailand and Ghana.

== Merchandise ==
Most products are based in specific cultures and traditions. Artisans make items that are familiar to them and oftentimes, the tradition has been passed down from generation to generation.

== Business advisory services ==
In 2009, Novica began working with the Grassroots Business Fund, a non-profit organization based in Washington, DC, with a mission to build and support enterprises that provide economic opportunities to people at the base of the economic pyramid.
