= Taipei Ricci Institute =

Coordinates: 25°1′8.88″N 121°31′45.28″E

- Abbreviation: TRI
- Predecessor: Ricci Institute, Center for Chinese Studies
- Established: 1966; 60 years ago
- Affiliations: Jesuit, Catholic
- Website: taipeiricciinstitute.com

Taipei Ricci Institute (TRI) in Taipei, Taiwan, is one of four Ricci Institutes.

== History ==
Heir to the spirit of Matteo Ricci’s methods of evangelization in China in the 17th century, the Taipei Ricci Institute was established in 1966 by Father Yves Raguin, S.J. (1912–1998) and other Jesuit sinologists who were working on a multi-linguistic dictionary project launched around 1950 in Macau. Working on Chinese languages and religions, this institution revived the "Bureau d’Etudes Sinologiques" created in 1892 by the French Jesuits of Shanghai and its publication Variétés Sinologiques. The TRI keeps the editorial direction of the Variétés sinologiques today.

What is now known as the "Taipei Ricci Institute" was and is officially named "Ricci Institute, Center for Chinese Studies". The creation of other Ricci Institutes has enlarged the network and the influences of this institution.

In 1996, Benoît Vermander, S.J. succeeded Yves Raguin, taking over the running of the TRI. Accrued interaction with mainland China led to a redefinition of the tasks of the institute, now defined as follows:

to carry on dialogue and reflection towards and within the Chinese world, in order to make China become positive and active partner of globalization, thanks to a reinterpretation of its cultural resources. "Cultural diversity", "sustainable development" and "spiritual empowerment" are the three poles of development that the TRI constructs in confronting challenges and debates present in today’s China.

== Works ==
At the beginning, the TRI had two goals:

- To achieve the preparation and publication of dictionaries, work started in 1950. Since the 1970s, some middle-sized dictionaries have been published: Chinese-French, Chinese-Spanish and Chinese-Hungarian. Le Grand Ricci, the most important dictionary, was published in 2002: It includes seven volumes, 9,000 pages, 13,500 words and more than 300,000 definitions. It is recognized as the most complete Chinese-foreign language dictionary in the world.
- To conduct studies of comparative spirituality, with a special interest for Chinese Taoism and Buddhism. Yves Raguin has published about 20 books on this topic. (See www.riccibase.com.) His works reflect an effort on dialogue with the other religions and trends of philosophical thinking, that were emphasized in Council Vatican II.

== TRI publications ==
Besides the Dictionnaire Ricci de la langue chinoise (or Le Grand Ricci) TRI has authored or published more than 20 books in the field of Chinese studies, in Chinese, French and English, during the last decade, with special emphasis on oracular inscriptions, philosophy of peace and minority languages. Especially noteworthy is the publication of Chinese Christian Texts from the Roman Archives of the Society of Jesus. This collection of 12 volumes contains a selection of hitherto unpublished texts.

=== Renlai monthly ===
Renlai magazine ("human flute-or voice"), a Chinese expression created by Zhuangzi, Taoist philosopher, is a monthly magazine written in Chinese, published in Taipei since January 2004. This magazine is mainly concerned with social, spiritual and cultural topics. Edited by Renlai staff and TRI, the magazine is published in association with the French Jesuit review Etudes. Since 2006, TRI has started an internet magazine eRenlai, available in English, Chinese, both traditional and simplified. Renlai and eRenlai are particularly concerned about questions such as sustainable development, cultural diversity and mobilization of spiritual resources in the Chinese world.

== Bibliography ==
- Raguin, Yves, S.J., The History of the Grand Dictionnaire Ricci de la Langue Chinoise, The Ricci Bulletin 1999–2000, No. 3, January 2000, p. 53-64.
- Raguin, Yves, S.J., Une grande entreprise lexicographique, la collection de dictionnaires chinois des pères jésuites de Taichung (Formose), Etudes, jan 1956, pp. 261–267.
- Vermander, Benoît, S.J., Le Dictionnaire Ricci et les échanges culturels Chine – Occident, Paris: Institut Ricci de Taipei, 2000. (魏明德，沈秀貞譯，利氏漢法字典與中西文化交流，台北：利氏學社，2000)
- Institut Ricci: Le Grand dictionnaire Ricci de la langue chinois, 7 Vols. Paris: Institut Ricci de Taipei, 2001.
- Vermander, Benoît, S.J., The Catholic Church and Chinese Studies in Taiwan: the Contribution of the Taipei Ricci Institute, The Ricci Bulletin 2004, No. 7, February 2004, p. 17-34.

== See also ==
- List of Jesuit sites
