= Li Jinyuan =

Li Jinyuan may refer to:

- Li Jinyuan (painter) (李金远), Chinese painter
- Li Jinyuan (businessman) (李金元), Chinese businessman
