= Ricci Institutes =

The Ricci Institutes, named after the sinologist Matteo Ricci, are research and publication centers directed towards the studies of Chinese ancient and modern culture as well as towards the intercultural dialogue between the Chinese World and the others spiritual traditions in the world. They were directly preceded by the “Bureau d’Études Sinologiques" that pioneered modern sinological research, an organization created by French Jesuits at the end of the 19th century in Shanghai.

There are four institutes in the world:

- The Taipei Ricci Institute, founded in 1966 by Father Yves Raguin, S.J.
- The Paris Ricci Institute, founded in 1972 by Father Claude Larre, S.J.
- The Ricci Institute at Boston College. The institute was originally founded in 1984 by Edward Malatesta, S.J. at the University of San Francisco. After thirty-seven years, it moved to Boston College in September 2021.
- The Macau Ricci Institute, founded in 1999 by Yves Camus, S.J. and Luis Sequeira, S.J.

These institutes are juridically independent and foster different research and publication programs, while cooperating on occasional projects. Although the Ricci Institutes are Jesuit-led works, directors and staff may also be lay persons, cooperating with Chinese or foreign sinologists.

== See also ==
- List of Jesuit sites

== Bibliography ==
- MASSON, Michel, s.j., Reporting on the Individual Reports IRACS’s 2003 Meeting at USF, The Ricci Bulletin 2004, No. 7, February 2004, p. 9–16.
