= Dionisio Cimarelli =

Italian sculptor (born 1965)

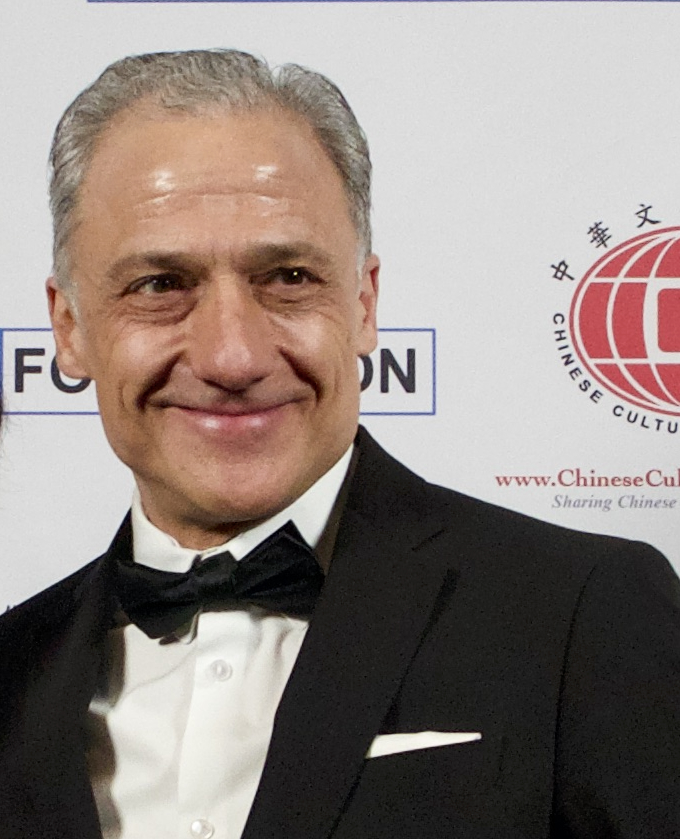
- Dionisio Cimarelli at Harvard Club, New York (2018)
- Born: September 8, 1965; Jesi, Italy
- Education: Accademia di Belle Arti di Carrara; Imperial Academy of Arts; Academy of Fine Arts Prague
- Known for: Artist
- Notable work: Matteo Ricci sculpture
- Style: Abstract and Figurative Sculpture
- Website: dionisiocimarelli.com

Dionisio Cimarelli (born September 8, 1965 in Jesi, Italy) is an Italian sculptor known for his expertise in both classical and contemporary figurative sculptures in particularly in marble and Chinese porcelain and a sculpture of Matteo Ricci. With over three decades of experience, he has contributed to significant restoration projects and influenced future generations through teaching positions at institutions such as The Art Students League of New York, where he was awarded the title of Emeritus Professor, the New York Academy of Art and the Fashion Institute of Technology, in New York City.

His career started at the Accademia di Belle Arti di Carrara, Italy, where he began to hone his skills in classical sculpture. His expertise led him to collaborate on restoration projects at prominent monuments, including the Louvre Museum in Paris and the Royal Stockholm Palace. Throughout his career, his works have been exhibited in galleries and museums such as MOCA Museum of Contemporary Art Shanghai, the Berlin Philharmonie, the Venice Biennale, and the Beijing International Art Biennale, among others. His contributions to the field of sculpture have been recognized with numerous awards, affirming his role in contemporary art.

== Early life ==
He was born in Jesi, and at the age of seven, his family moved to the nearby town of Moie di Maiolati Spontini, the birthplace of the composer Gaspare Spontini. Despite having no familial ties to the arts or exposure to artistic discourse, he displayed an early and profound sensitivity toward the world of art. In 1975, his talent was recognized when he won first prize in the Premio Natale, a local art competition designed exclusively for primary school students.

== Education ==
In 1983, Cimarelli earned a diploma in sculpture at Liceo artistico Edgardo Mannucci (formerly Istituto Statale d'Arte "E. Mannucci") in Ancona, Italy.

In 1989, he graduated in sculpture from the Accademia di Belle Arti di Carrara, Italy. To collect information for his thesis, in 1986 Dionisio traveled to China on the Trans-Siberian Railway to China. The trip was made possible by a letter of invitation from the sculptor Floriano Bodini, then president of the Art Academy. His travel history and his pictures while traveling were published in July 1988 on the Italian magazine “Tuttoturismo” in Milan, Italy.

In 1994, Cimarelli was awarded a diploma in sculpture at Scola prufesciunela per la artejanat artistich (School of specialization in sculpture of wooden figure) in Sëlva di Val Gardena, Italy. In 1995, he enrolled at the University of Paris in Paris, France. In 1997, he studied with sculptor Mikhail Anikushin at the Imperial Academy of Arts in St. Petersburg, Russia. In 1998, he studied at the Academy of Fine Arts, Prague, Czech Republic.

== Work ==
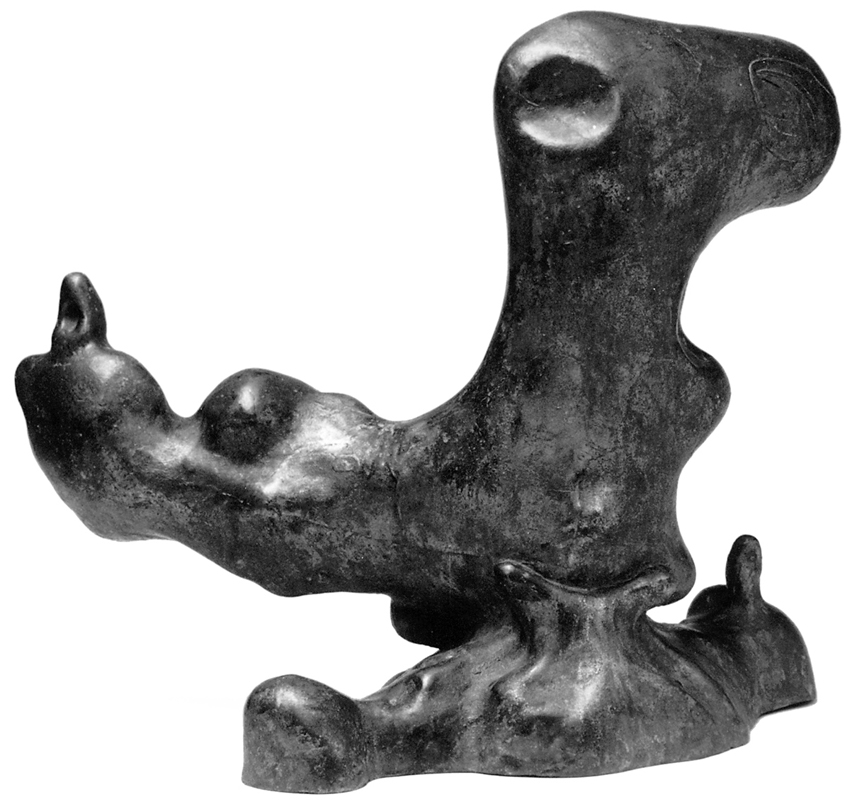
The pleasant dream, 1985 Bronze, H 50 cm

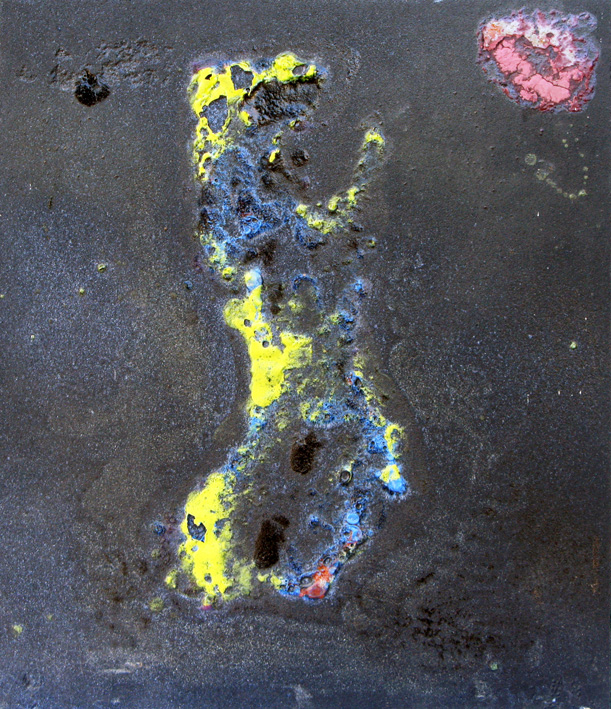
1989 Ceramic

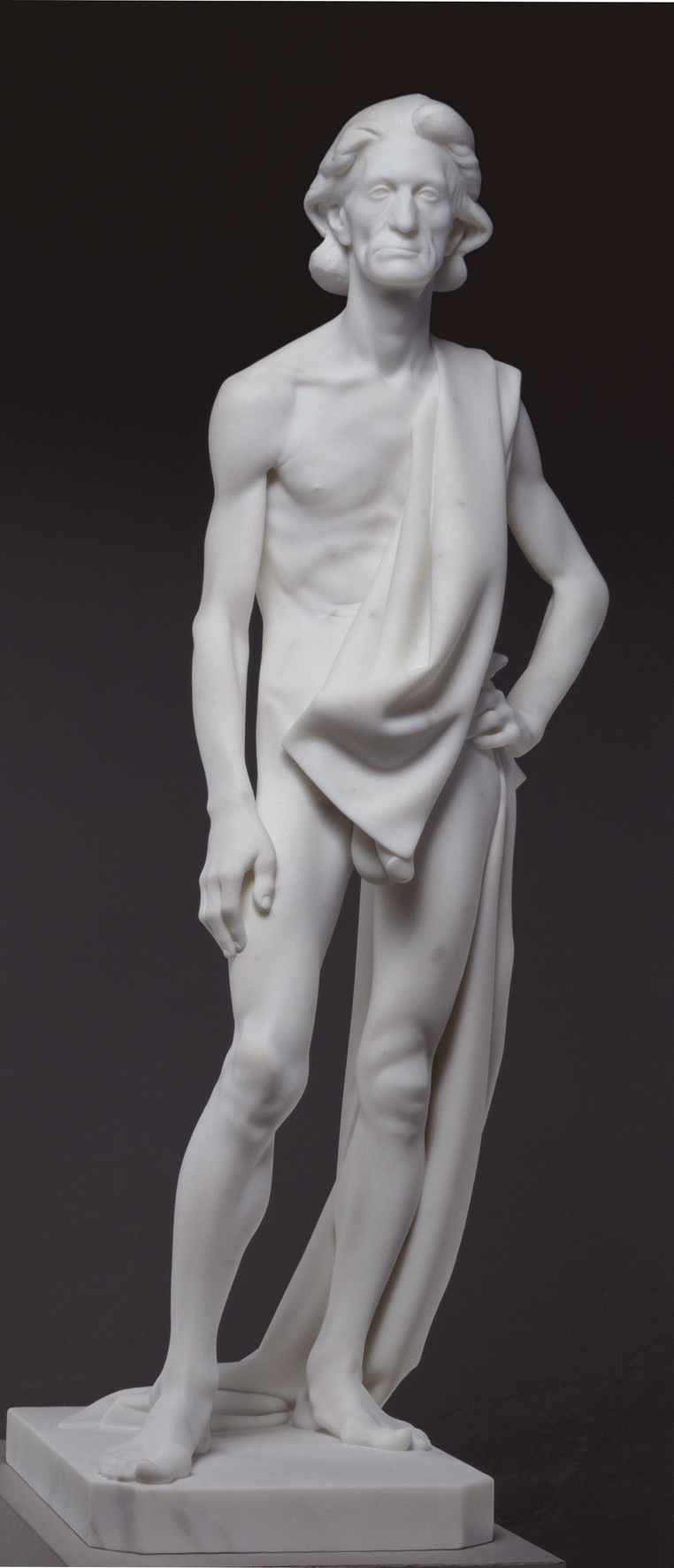
St. John the Baptist 2001, Carrara Marble H.150 cm.

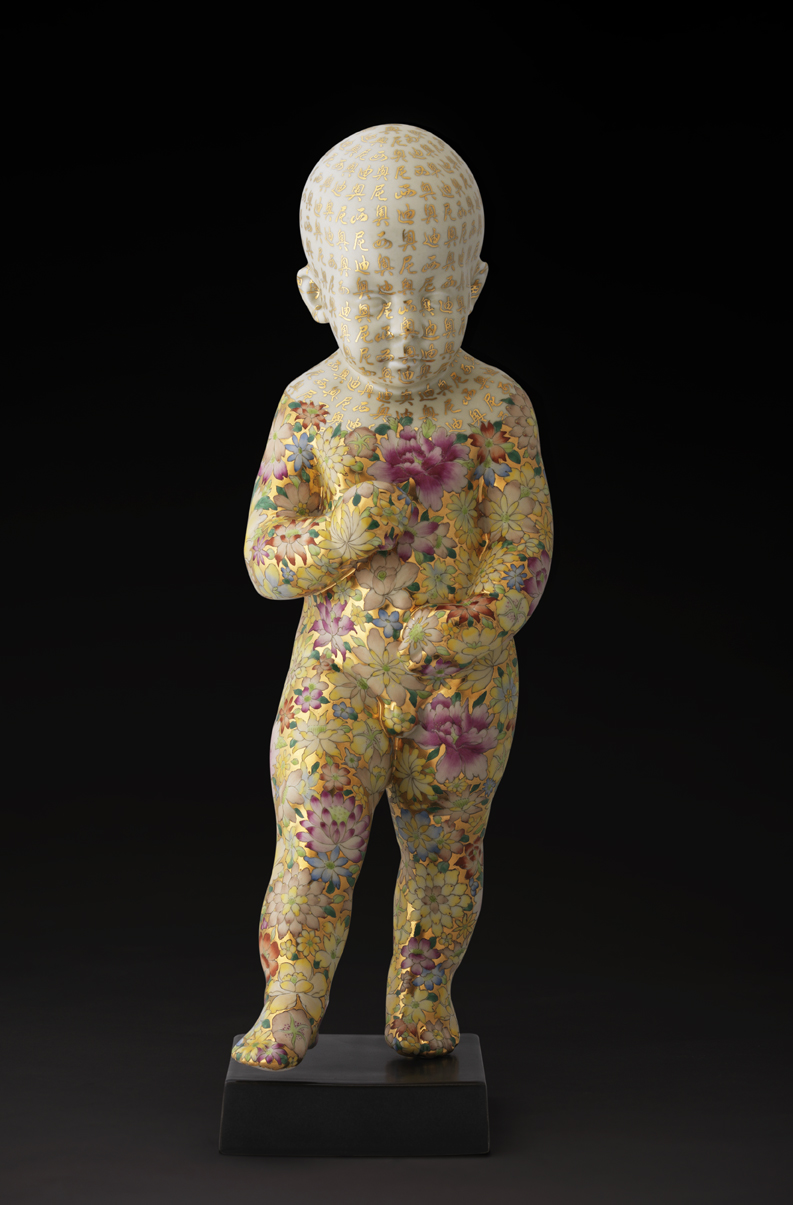
Child N.7, 2008 Chinese Porcelain, H 60 cm

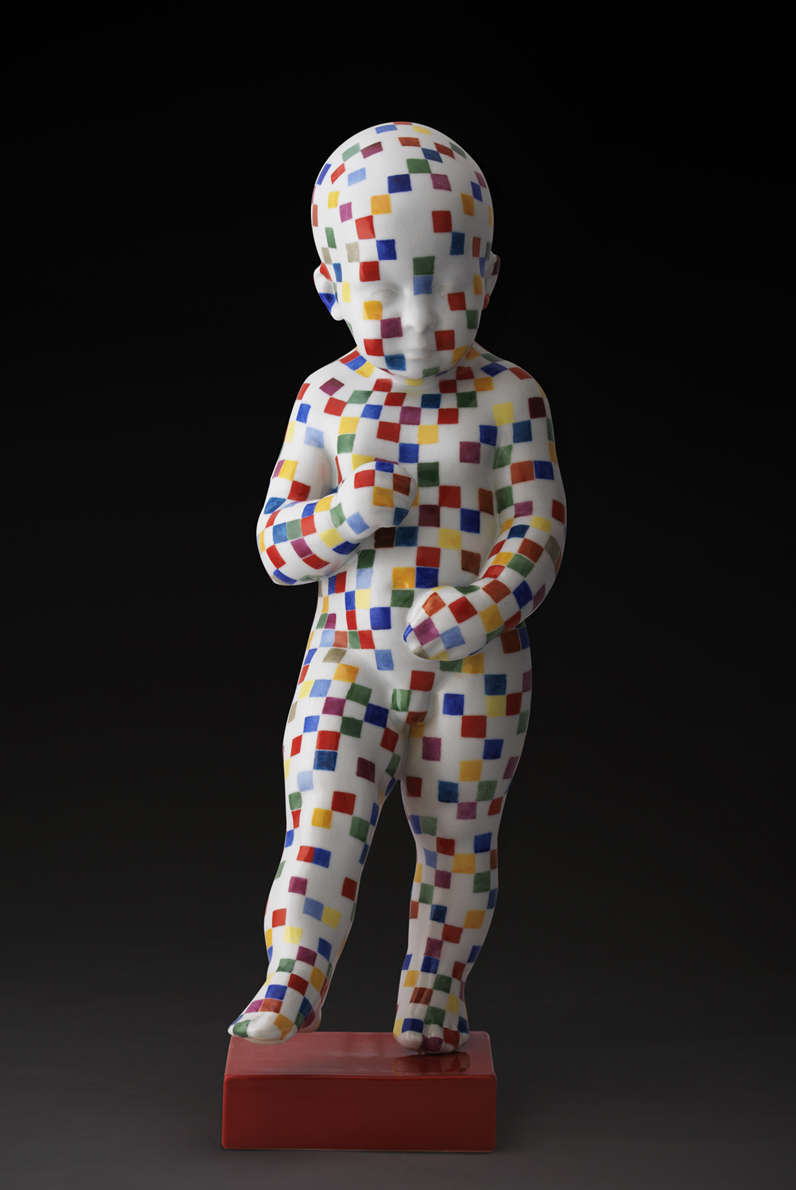
Child, Chinese Porcelain 2008

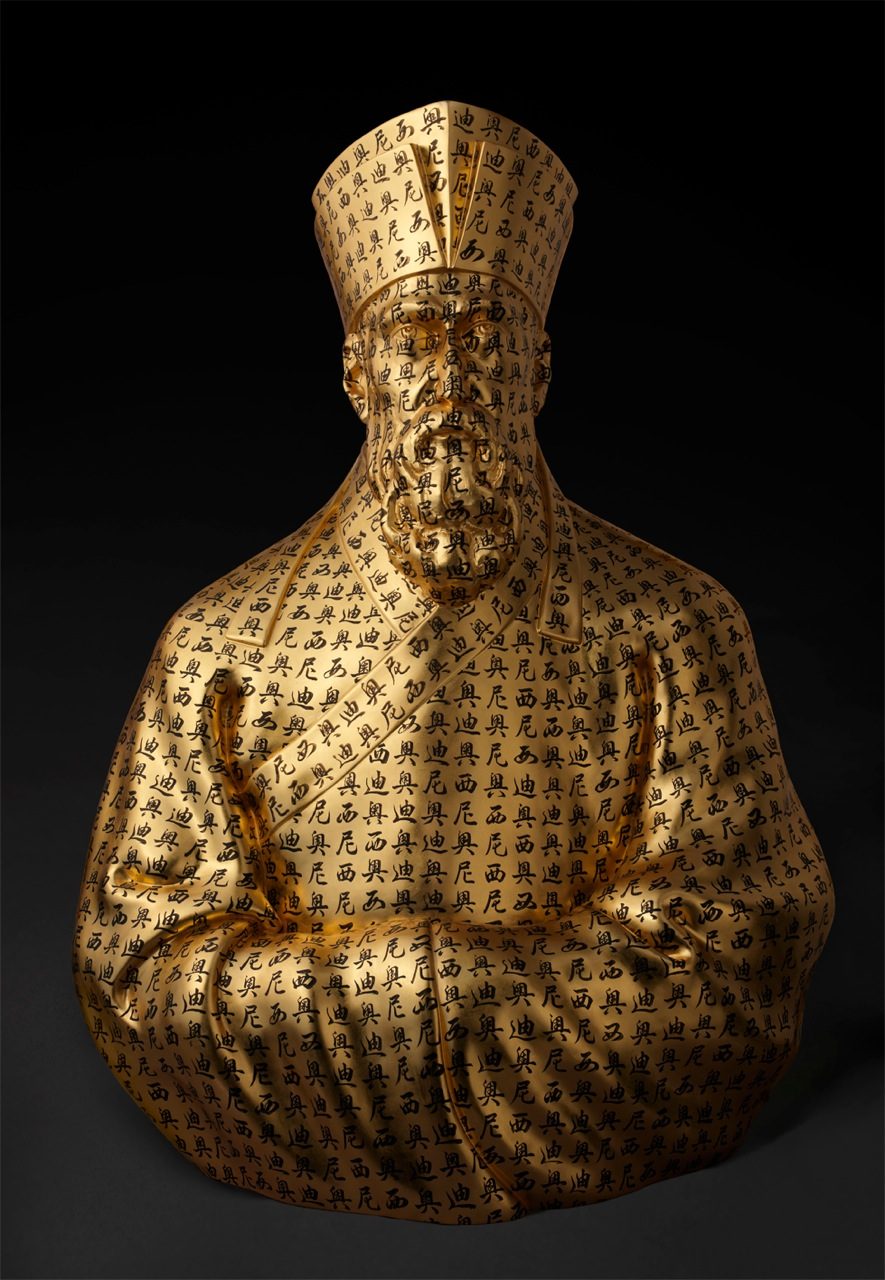
Matteo Ricci, Gilded Fiberglass with 24K Gold Leaf and Calligraphy, 150 cm, 2010

Abstract Beginning his career with the creation of abstract anthropomorphic shapes inspired by surrealism, the artist explored a variety of materials from 1983 to 1990, including terracotta, ceramic, wood, bronze, and marble. These works reflect an experimentation with movement and form, aiming to capture the essence of human and natural elements in non-figurative compositions. His first solo exhibition of abstract sculptures, held at the Berliner Philharmonie in Berlin in 1999 at the invitation of Maestro Claudio Abbado, marked a turning point in his career, introducing his work to an international audience.

Realism The transition to realism in 1991 was profoundly influenced by the artist's restoration work at the Louvre Museum in Paris. During this period, he developed a deep understanding of classical techniques, which he applied to the creation of figurative sculptures. By studying the works of Renaissance and Baroque old masters, he refined his skill in human representation, working with materials such as marble, ceramics, wood and bronze. One of his most significant works from this period is the marble sculpture of St. John the Baptist, created in 2001 and first exhibited in Oslo, Norway. The piece garnered attention for its adherence to realist techniques while also showcasing stylistic innovation.

Figurative Chinese Series From 2007 to 2008, a series of contemporary figurative sculptures in porcelain was developed in Jingdezhen, in the Jiangxi province of China, a city historically renowned as the "capital of porcelain." This series represents a unique synthesis of Eastern and Western traditions, combining aesthetic elements and techniques from both Italian and Chinese heritage. The vibrant and jewel-like surface finishing evoke traditional Chinese glazing methods, while the integration of Italian sculptural aesthetics adds a distinct intercultural dimension. These works have been exhibited in various international galleries and museums, highlighting their contribution to the ongoing cultural dialogue between East and West.

== Restoration ==
Cimarelli has participated in several large sculptural and architectural restoration projects.

- Louvre Museum, Paris (1990-1991): Contributed to the restoration of the Cour Napoléon, part of the largest restoration project at the Louvre in the 20th century, which surrounded the iconic Louvre Pyramid designed by I.M. Pei. This undertaking required the use of modern sculptural techniques combined with classical knowledge, ensuring a harmonious integration between contemporary architectural elements and the museum’s historical fabric.
- Christiansborg Palace Chapel, Copenhagen, Denmark (1995): Responsible for the reconstruction of the sculptures within this historic royal chapel following a significant fire and the collapse of the dome. The restoration project required the use of advanced stucco restoration techniques to repair and reconstruct the neoclassical sculptures, ensuring the preservation of both their structural and aesthetic integrity. This work was essential in maintaining the cultural and historical significance of one of Denmark's most important heritage sites.
- Strasbourg Cathedral, Strasbourg, France (1998): Contributed to the restoration of Strasbourg Cathedral, a UNESCO World Heritage Site. His work focused on the façade and the sculptural and decorative elements, adhering to the Gothic architecture style and using the same materials as those employed during the original construction period.
- Porte d'Aix, Marseille, France (1998): The restoration of this iconic triumphal arch required complex stonework intervention. The focus was on the recovery of the detailed decorative reliefs, which had undergone significant deterioration over time due to exposure to the elements.
- Institution of Civil Engineers Headquarters, London, England (2002): Contributed to the restoration of the historic interior of this landmark building in Westminster, London. The focus was on the reconstruction of its classical Carrara marble and stucco sculptures, ensuring the preservation of the building's architectural integrity and its significance in British engineering history.
- Stockholm Palace and House of Nobility, Stockholm, Sweden (2003)

Restoration work on these two of Stockholm's most important palaces involved the reconstruction of stone sculptures and decorations, utilizing modern techniques and contemporary materials to ensure both aesthetic and structural preservation. These efforts were essential in restoring the grandeur of buildings that hold a central place in Sweden's royal and cultural heritage.

== Zhongkai Sheshan Villas ==
From 2007-2010, Cimarelli served as Art Supervisor for the Zhongkai Sheshan Villas in Shanghai, China. Designed by ten architectural firms from United States, the project consisted of 81 contemporary luxury villas. Four of the villas were designed by Mack Scogin of Mack Scogin Merrill Elam, architect and adjunct Professor of Architecture at Harvard University. Built with stone, marble, wood, and metal, Cimarelli oversaw the quality of materials and construction for the project.

== Matteo Ricci sculpture ==
Inspired by Matteo Ricci since his first visit to China in 1986, this sculpture was created for the Italy Pavilion at the Shanghai World Expo 2010, commemorating the 400th anniversary of Ricci's death. The sculpture, a blend of Italian and Chinese cultural elements, was exhibited throughout the whole duration of the Expo, where it was seen by a large international audience.

Crafted in his Shanghai studio, the sculpture also features calligraphy painted by a Chinese calligrapher, adding an authentic cultural layer to the work. After the Expo, the sculpture was displayed for two years at the Italian Embassy in Beijing and was later acquired by the Government of the Marche Region. It is now permanently installed at the entrance of the Confucius Institute in Macerata, while the original plaster model is permanently exhibited at the entrance of the Consulate General of Italy in Shanghai, symbolizing the enduring cultural exchange between Italy and China.

== Academic Contributions and lectures ==
Cimarelli has served as a visiting scholar at several prestigious institutions, including the Faculty of Fine Arts of Bundipatanasilpa Institute University in Bangkok, Thailand; Wimbledon College of Art in London, England; and King Saud University in Riyadh, Saudi Arabia.

His international lecturing experience spans numerous esteemed universities, such as Sir J.J. School of Art at the University of Mumbai, India; Silliman University in Dumaguete, Philippines; China Academy of Art in Hangzhou, China; China Central Academy of Fine Arts and Beijing Renwen University in Beijing, China; and Ontario College of Art & Design in Toronto, Canada.

He has also been a distinguished guest speaker at various respected venues and events, including the "RISO" Museum of Contemporary Art in Palermo in Italy; High Street Italia Seoul in South Korea, University Club of New York for the Annual Savoy History Lecture, Columbia University. in New York City; Montclair University (New Jersey) USA, The Art Students League of New York; the Italian Cultural Institute in San Francisco, California USA; the Diocesan Museum in Jesi, Italy; and the Beijing International Sculpture Forum organized by the Ministry of Culture of the People's Republic of China and China Sculpture Magazine. Additionally, he has presented at Mingyuan Art Centre and at Shanghai Library in Shanghai, China. In 2019, he was invited to share his extraordinary life and artistic journey at Theatre Carlo Goldoni in Corinaldo and at the Academy of Fine Arts of Macerata, in Italy.

== Awards and recognition ==
- 2024 Inclusion in the Treccani Encyclopedia, Italy
- 2023 Emeritus Instructor Art Students League of New York
- 2019 "Marchigiano of the Year in the world", at Senate of Italy in Rome
- 2015 Permanent Residence United States for Alien of extraordinary ability
- 2011 Civic Commendation Spontini D'Oro, Municipality of Maiolati Spontini, Italy
- 1997 Sculpture Scholarship Ministry of Foreign Affairs, Rome, Italy
- 1996 Sculpture Scholarship National Sculpture Society, New York, NY
- 1995 Sculpture Scholarship New York Academy of Art, New York, NY

== Selected Exhibitions ==
- Berlin Philharmonie, Berlin, Germany
- Wilhelm Galerie, Potsdam, Germany
- Galleri Asur, Oslo, Norway
- Consulate General of Italy, Shanghai, China
- Embassy of Italy, Cultural Institute, Beijing, China
- Italian Center, Shanghai, China
- Beijing International Art Biennale, Beijing, China
- Shanghai International Biennial City Sculpture Exhibition, Shanghai, China
- Dumaguete Terracotta Sculpture Biennale, Dumaguete, Philippines
- Moon River, Contemporary Art Museum, Beijing, China
- MOCA Shanghai, Museum Of Contemporary Art, Shanghai, China
- Chinese International Sculpture Almanac Exhibition, Beijing / Hangzhou, China
- Shanghai Art Museum, Shanghai, China
- Expo 2010, Italian Pavilion, Shanghai, China
- Venice Biennale - Padiglione ITALIA nel Mondo, Venice, Italy
- China Nandaihe International Sculpture Exhibition, Nandaihe, China
- Accademia di Belle Arti di Macerata Macerata, Italy
- The Art Students League of New York, USA

== Film and documentary ==
- Dionisio Cimarelli, Documentary on Oriental Television at Art Channel of Shanghai Media Group in Shanghai, China
