= Matteo Ricci =

Italian Catholic missionary (1552–1610)

Venerable Matteo Ricci SJ
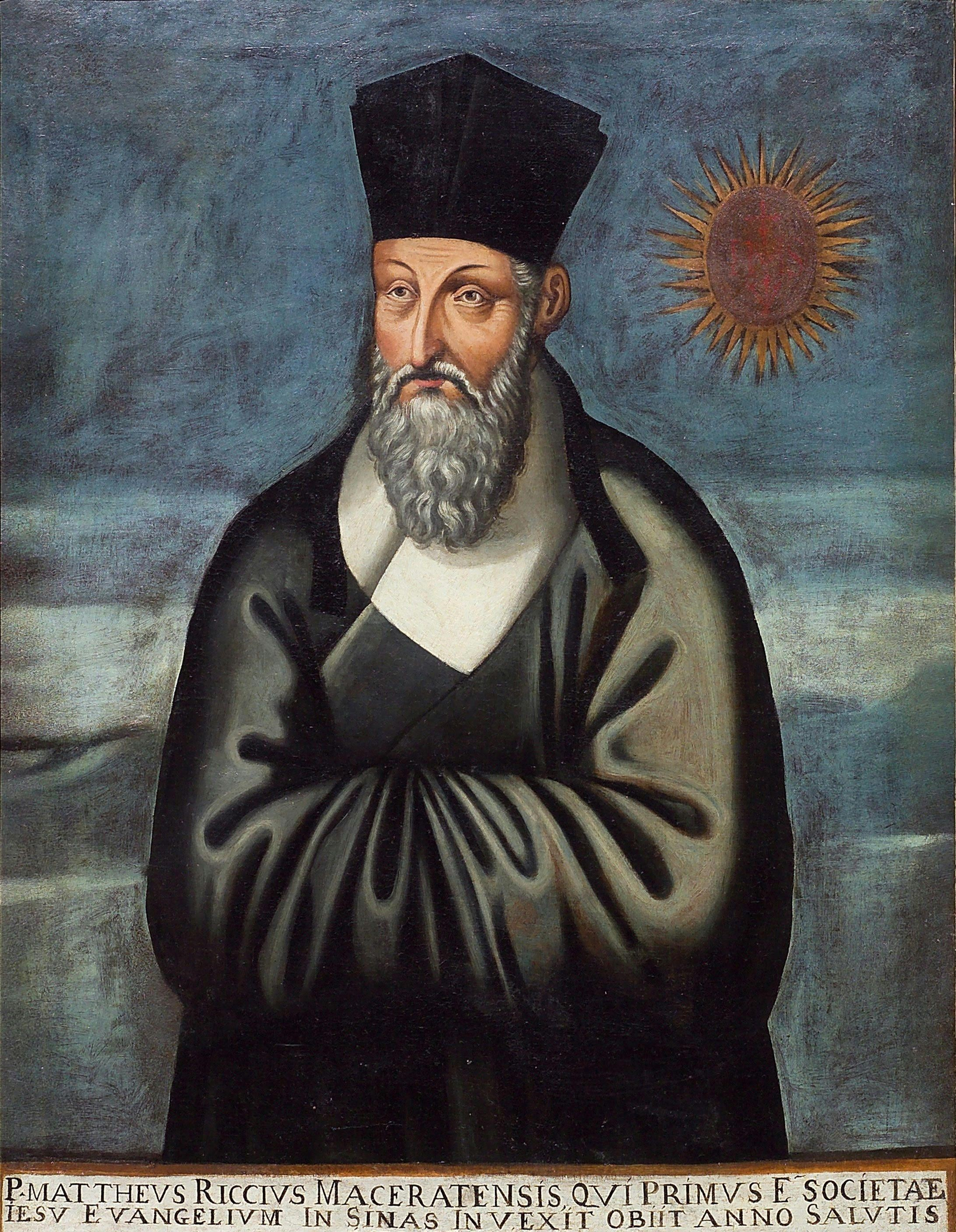
- Chinese portrait of Ricci from 1610
- Born: 6 October 1552; Macerata, Papal States
- Died: 11 May 1610 (aged 57); Beijing, Ming Empire
- Major works: Kunyu Wanguo Quantu

Chinese name
- Chinese: 利玛窦
Transcriptions
Standard Mandarin
- Hanyu Pinyin: Lì Mǎdòu

Matteo Ricci SJ (Italian: [matˈtɛːo ˈrittʃi]; Latin: Matthaeus Riccius; Chinese: 利玛窦; pinyin: Lì Mǎdòu; 6 October 1552 – 11 May 1610) was an Italian Jesuit who served in the court of Ming dynasty China and one of the founding figures of the Jesuit China missions. He created the Kunyu Wanguo Quantu, a 1602 world map written in Chinese characters. In 2022, the Apostolic See declared its recognition of Ricci's heroic virtue, thereby bestowing upon him the honorific of a Venerable.

Ricci arrived at the Portuguese settlement of Macau in 1582 where he began his missionary work in China. He mastered the Chinese language and writing system. He became the first European to enter the Forbidden City of Beijing in 1601 when invited by the Wanli Emperor, who sought his services in matters such as court astronomy and calendrical science. He emphasized parallels between Catholicism and Confucianism, and he converted several prominent Chinese officials to Catholicism. He also worked with several Chinese elites, such as Xu Guangqi, in translating Euclid's Elements into Chinese as well as the Confucian classics into Latin for the first time in history.

== Life ==
Ricci was born on 6 October 1552 in Macerata, part of the Papal States and today a city in the Italian region of Marche. He studied the classics in his native hometown and studied law at Rome for two years. He entered the Society of Jesus in April 1571 at the Roman College. While there, in addition to philosophy and theology, he also studied mathematics, cosmology, and astronomy under the direction of Christopher Clavius. In 1577, he applied for a missionary expedition to the Far East. He sailed from Lisbon, Portugal, in March 1578 and arrived in Goa, a Portuguese colony, the following September. Ricci remained employed in teaching and the ministry there until the end of Lent 1582 when he was summoned to Macau to prepare to enter China. Ricci arrived in Macau in the early part of August.

=== Ricci in China ===
Matteo Ricci
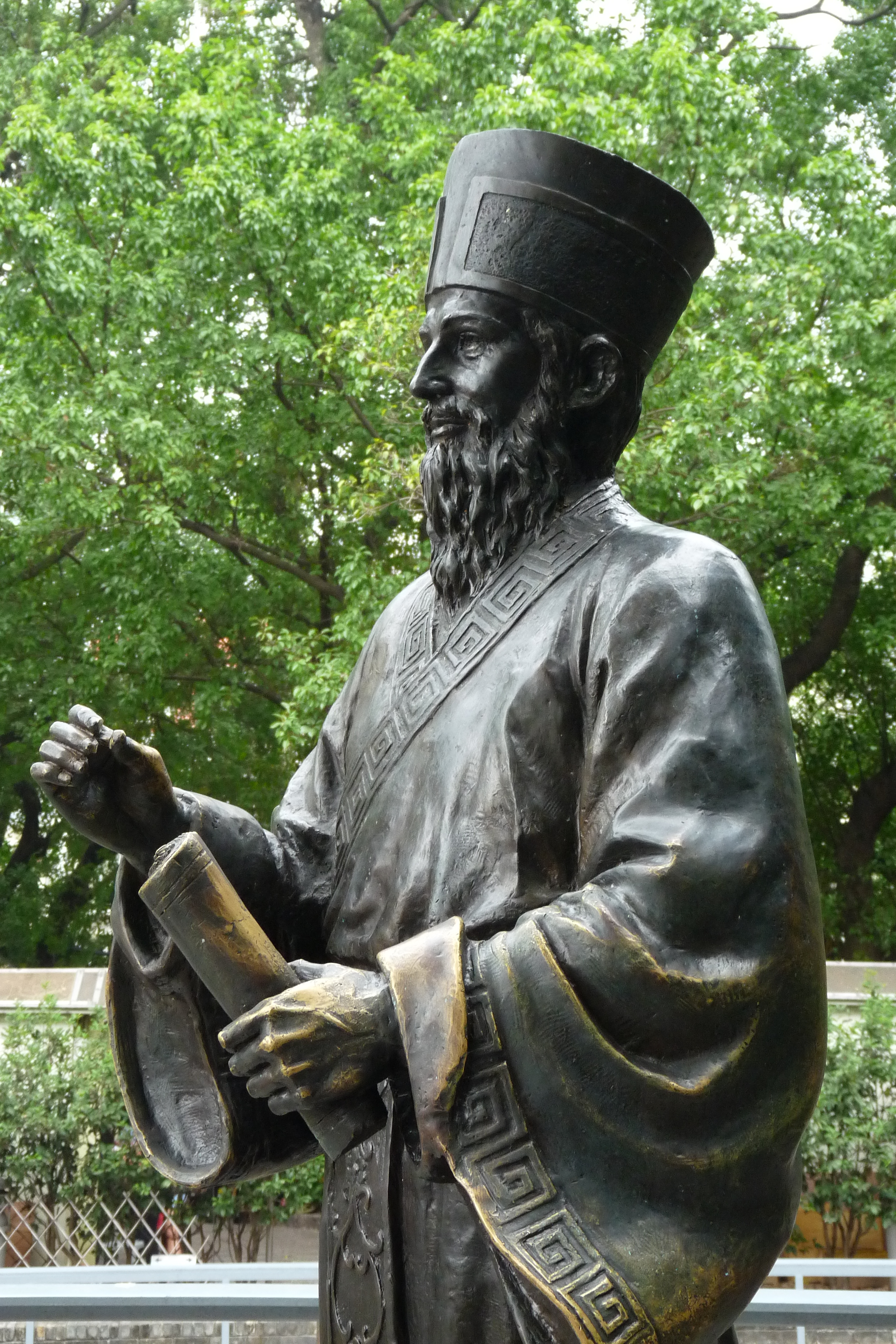
- The statue of Ricci in downtown Macao, unveiled on 7 August 2010, the anniversary of his arrival on the island
- Traditional Chinese: 利瑪竇
- Simplified Chinese: 利玛窦
Transcriptions
Standard Mandarin
- Hanyu Pinyin: Lì Mǎdòu
- Bopomofo: ㄌㄧˋ ㄇㄚˇㄉㄡˋ
- Gwoyeu Romatzyh: Lih Maadow
- Wade–Giles: Li^{4} Ma^{3}-tou^{4}
- Tongyong Pinyin: Lì Mǎ-dòu
- IPA: [lî màtôʊ]
Yue: Cantonese
- Jyutping: lei6 maa5dau6
- IPA: [lej˨ ma˩˧tɐw˨]

Courtesy name: Xitai
- Chinese: 西泰
Transcriptions
Standard Mandarin
- Hanyu Pinyin: Xītài
- Bopomofo: ㄒㄧ ㄊㄞˋ
- Gwoyeu Romatzyh: Shitay
- Wade–Giles: Hsi^{1}-tʻai^{4}
- Tongyong Pinyin: Si-tài
- IPA: [ɕítʰâɪ]

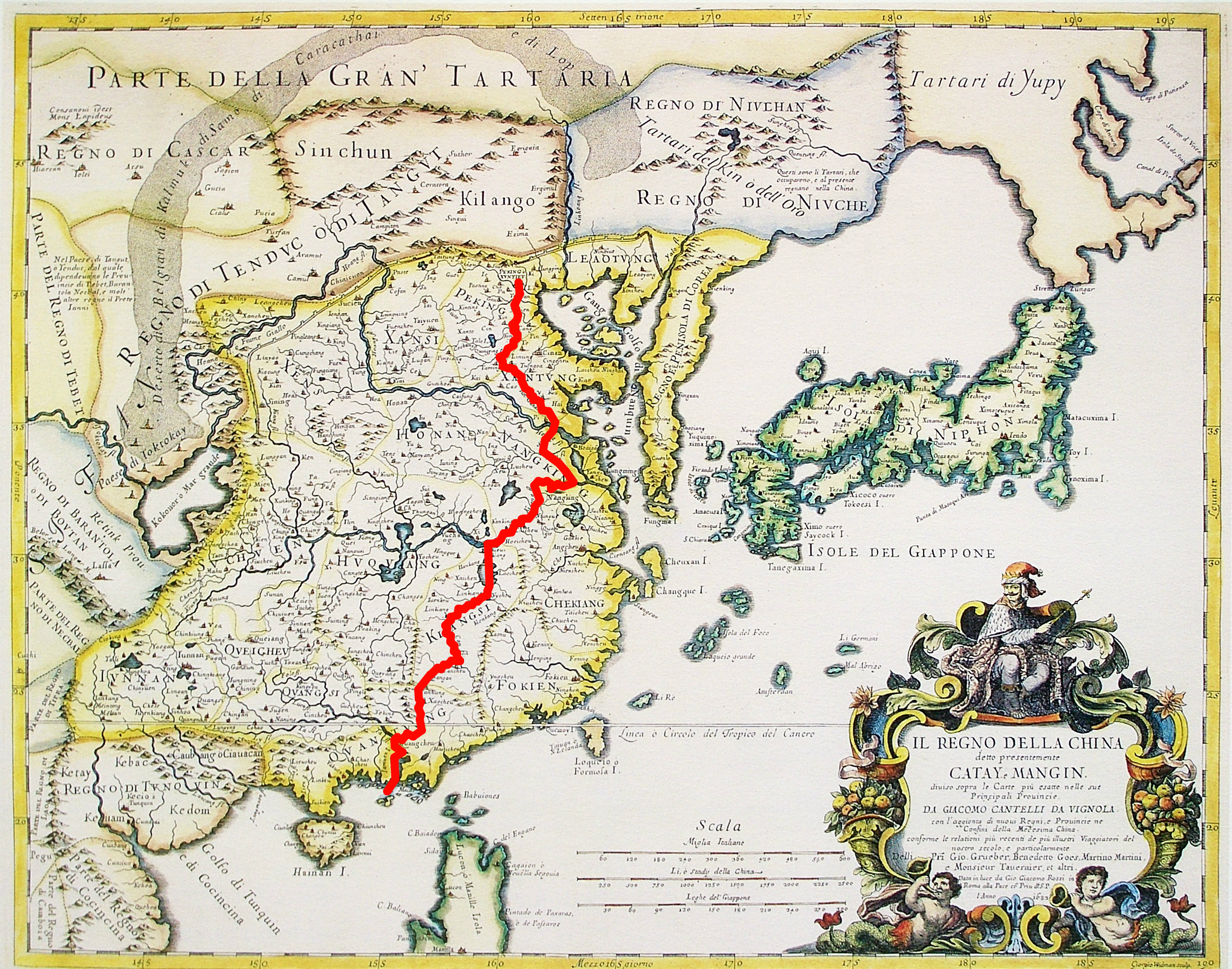
Ricci's way from Macau to Beijing

In August 1582, Ricci arrived at Macau, a Portuguese trading post on the South China Sea. At the time, Christian missionary activity in China was almost completely limited to Macau, where some of the local Chinese people had converted to Christianity. Three years before, Michele Ruggieri was invited from Portuguese India expressly to study Chinese, by Alessandro Valignano, founder of St. Paul Jesuit College (Macau), and to prepare for the Jesuits' mission from Macau into Mainland China.

Once in Macau, Ricci studied the Chinese language and customs. It was the beginning of a long project that made him one of the first Western scholars to master the Chinese script and Classical Chinese. With Ruggieri, he travelled to Guangdong's major cities, Canton and Zhaoqing (then the residence of the Viceroy of Guangdong and Guangxi), seeking to establish a permanent Jesuit mission outside Macau.

In 1583, Ricci and Ruggieri settled in Zhaoqing, at the invitation of the governor of Zhaoqing, Wang Pan, who had heard of Ricci's skill as a mathematician and cartographer. Ricci stayed in Zhaoqing from 1583 to 1589, when he was expelled by a new viceroy. It was in Zhaoqing, in 1584, that Ricci composed the first European-style world map in Chinese, called "Da Ying Quan Tu" (Chinese: 大瀛全圖; lit. 'Complete Map of the Great World'). No prints of the 1584 map are known to exist, but, of the much improved and expanded Kunyu Wanguo Quantu of 1602, six recopied, rice-paper versions survive.

It is thought that, during their time in Zhaoqing, Ricci and Ruggieri compiled a Portuguese-Chinese dictionary, the first in any European language, for which they developed a system for transcribing Chinese words in the Latin alphabet. The manuscript was misplaced in the Jesuit Archives in Rome, rediscovered only in 1934, and published only in 2001.

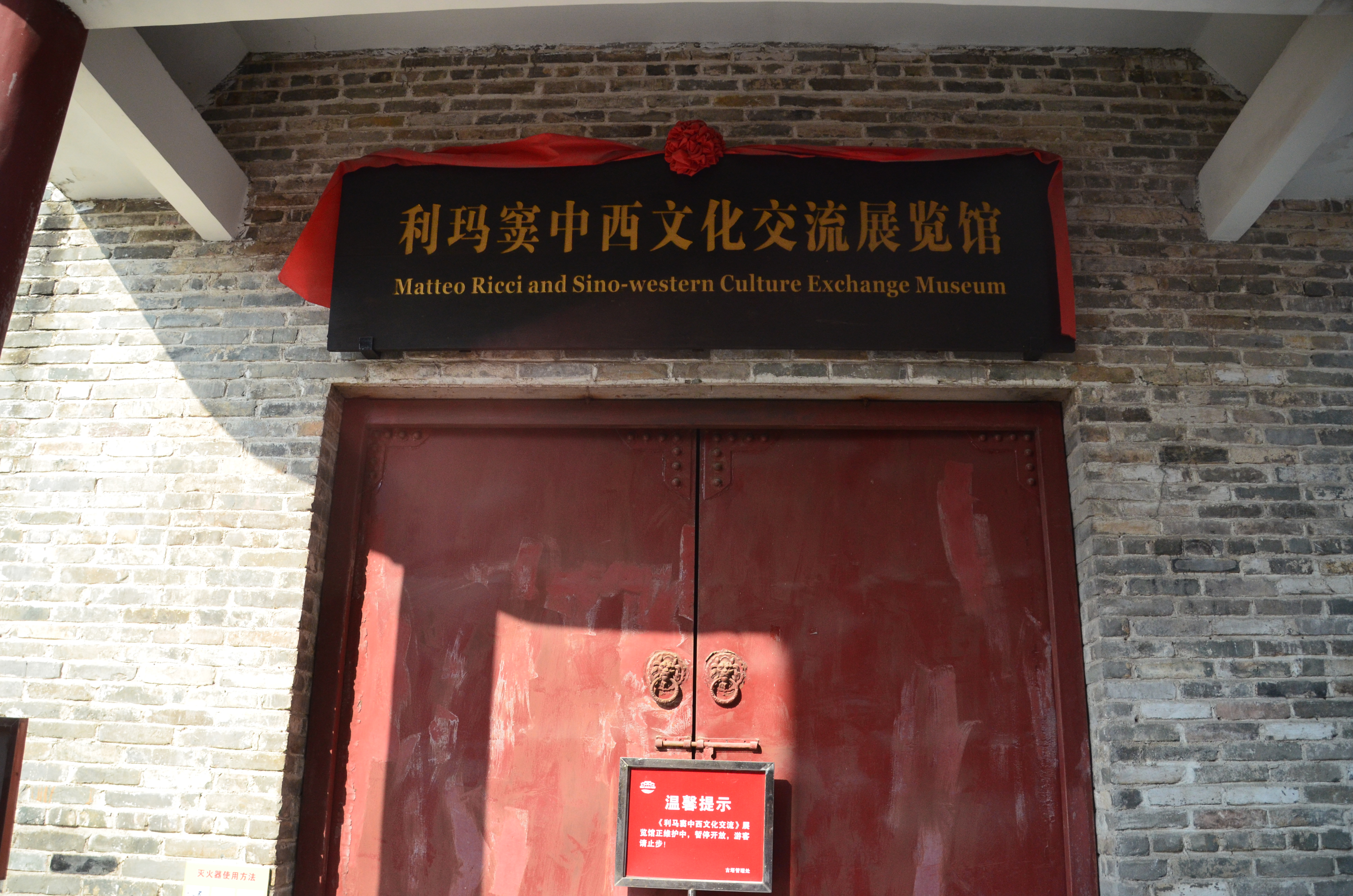
Matteo Ricci Museum in Zhaoqing located on the site of the Catholic Church he helped found called Xianhua Temple (仙花寺)

There is now a memorial plaque in Zhaoqing to commemorate Ricci's six-year stay there, as well as a "Ricci Memorial Centre" in a building dating from the 1860s.

Expelled from Zhaoqing in 1588, Ricci obtained permission to relocate to Shaoguan (Shaozhou, in Ricci's account) in the north of the province, and reestablish his mission there.

Further travels saw Ricci reach Nanjing (Ming's southern capital) and Nanchang in 1595. In August 1597, Alessandro Valignano (1539–1606), his superior, appointed him Major Superior of the mission in China, with the rank and powers of a Provincial, a charge that he fulfilled until his death. He moved to Tongzhou (a port of Beijing) in 1598, and first reached the capital Beijing itself on 7 September 1598. However, because of a Chinese intervention against the Japanese invasion of Korea at the time, Ricci could not reach the Imperial Palace. After waiting for two months, he left Beijing; first for Nanjing and then Suzhou in Southern Zhili Province.

During the winter of 1598, Ricci, with the help of his Jesuit colleague Lazzaro Cattaneo, compiled another Chinese-Portuguese dictionary, in which tones in Chinese syllables were indicated in Roman text with diacritical marks. Unlike Ricci's and Ruggieri's earlier Portuguese-Chinese dictionary, this work has not been found.

In 1601, Ricci was invited to become an adviser to the imperial court of the Wanli Emperor, the first Westerner to be invited into the Forbidden City. This honor was in recognition of Ricci's scientific abilities, chiefly his predictions of solar eclipses, which were significant events in the Chinese world. He established the Cathedral of the Immaculate Conception in Beijing, the oldest Catholic church in the city. Ricci was given free access to the Forbidden City but never met the reclusive Wanli Emperor, who, however, granted him patronage, with a generous stipend and supported Ricci's completion of the Zhifang Waiji, China's first global atlas.

Once established in Beijing, Ricci was able to meet important officials and leading members of the Beijing cultural scene and convert a number of them to Christianity, the most prominent being leading agronomist Xu Guangqi.

Ricci was also the first European to learn about the Kaifeng Jews, being contacted by a member of that community who was visiting Beijing in 1605. Ricci never visited Kaifeng, Henan Province, but he sent a junior missionary there in 1608, the first of many such missions. In fact, the elderly Chief Rabbi of the Jews was ready to cede his power to Ricci, as long as he gave up eating pork, but Ricci never accepted the position.

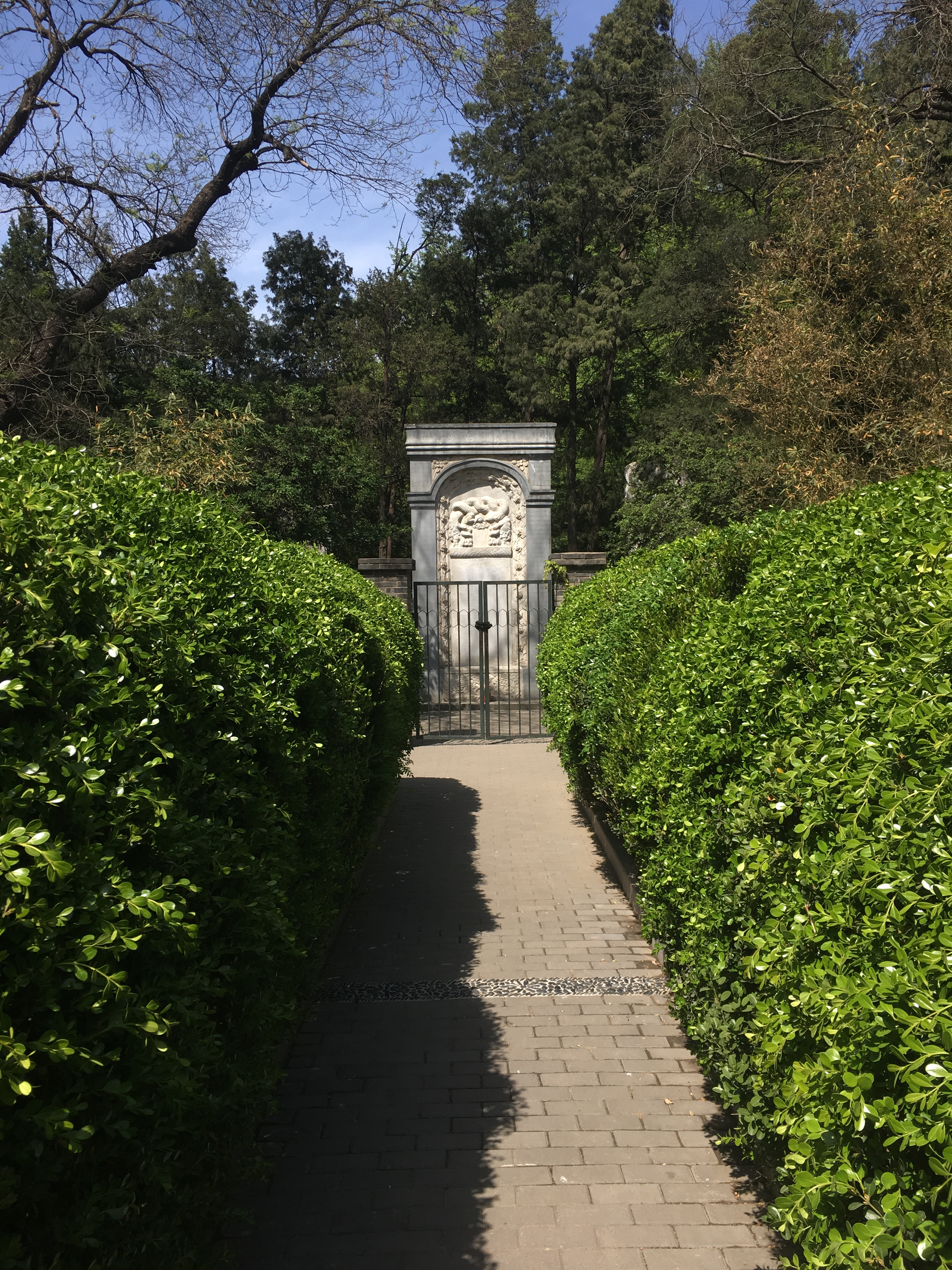
Ricci's grave (利玛窦墓) in Beijing's Zhalan Cemetery

Ricci died on 11 May 1610, in Beijing, aged 57. By the code of the Ming Dynasty, foreigners who died in China had to be buried in Macau. Diego de Pantoja made a special plea to the court, requesting a burial plot in Beijing, in the light of Ricci's contributions to China. The Wanli Emperor granted this request and designated a Buddhist temple for the purpose. In October 1610, Ricci's remains were transferred there. The graves of Ferdinand Verbiest, Johann Adam Schall von Bell, and other missionaries are also there, and it became known as the Zhalan Cemetery, which is today located within the campus of the Beijing Administrative College, in Xicheng District, Beijing.

Ricci was succeeded as Provincial Superior of the China mission by Nicolò Longobardo in 1610. Longobardo entrusted another Jesuit, Nicolas Trigault, with expanding and editing, as well as translating into Latin, those of Ricci's papers that were found in his office after his death. This work was first published in 1615 in Augsburg as De Christiana expeditione apud Sinas and soon was translated into a number of other European languages.

== Approach to Chinese culture ==
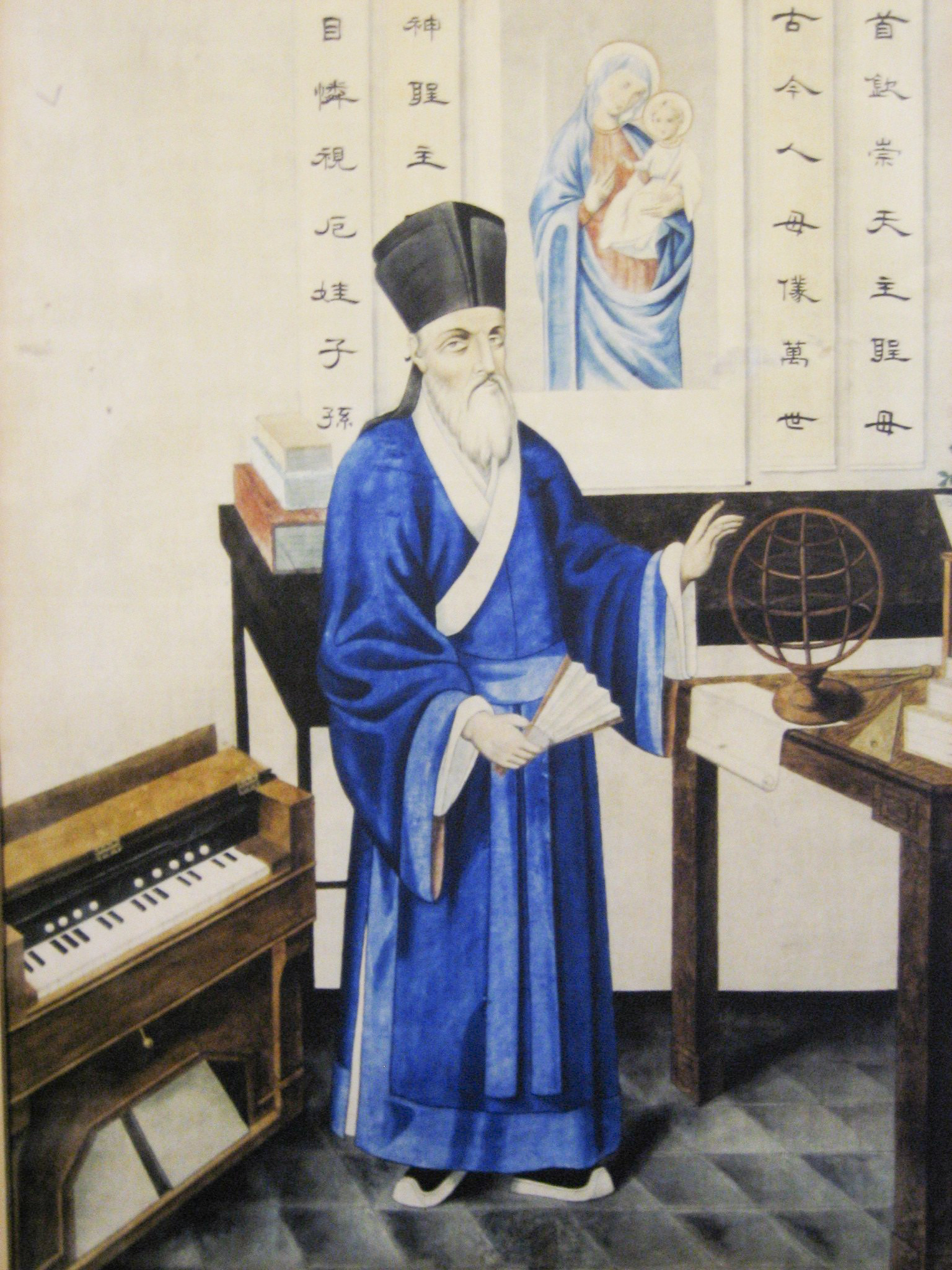
An early 17th-century depiction of Ricci in Chinese robes

Ricci could speak Chinese as well as read and write classical Chinese, the literary language of scholars and officials. He was known for his appreciation of Chinese culture in general but condemned the prostitution which was widespread in Beijing at the time. He also called the Chinese "barbarians" in letters back home to his friends, and opposed what he considered to be anti-Black prejudice among the populace. However, he noted this in the context of his function as a slave catcher for the Portuguese and owning African slaves himself.

During his research, he discovered that in contrast to the cultures of South Asia, Chinese culture was strongly intertwined with Confucian values and therefore decided to use existing Chinese concepts to explain Christianity. With his superior Valignano's formal approval, he aligned himself with the Confucian intellectually elite literati, and even adopted their mode of dress. He did not explain the Catholic faith as entirely foreign or new; instead, he said that the Chinese culture and people always believed in God and that Christianity is the completion of their faith, and explained the tenets of the Catholic faith through existing Chinese precepts and practices. He borrowed an unusual Chinese term, Tiānzhǔ (天主, "Lord of Heaven") to describe the God of Abraham, despite the term's origin in traditional Chinese worship of Heaven. (He also cited many synonyms from the Confucian Classics.)

Ricci took an accommodating approach on various Chinese practices, including rituals such as ancestor worship.Dominican and Franciscan missionaries considered this an unacceptable accommodation and later appealed to the Vatican on the issue. This Chinese rites controversy continued for centuries. In 1721, fallout from the controversy led the Kangxi emperor to expel the Jesuits. The Vatican's most recent statement on the Chinese rites controversy came in 1939. Some contemporary authors have praised Ricci as an exemplar of beneficial inculturation, avoiding at the same time distorting the Gospel message or neglecting the indigenous cultural media.

Like developments in India, the identification of European culture with Christianity led almost to the end of Catholic missions in China, but Christianity continued to grow in Sichuan and some other locations.

Xu Guangqi and Ricci became the first two to translate some of the Confucian classics into a Western language, Latin.

Ricci also met a Korean emissary to China, teaching the basic tenets of Catholicism and donating several books. Along with João Rodrigues's gifts to the ambassador Jeong Duwon in 1631, Ricci's gifts influenced the creation of Korea's Silhak movement.

== Beatification process ==
The cause of his beatification opened in 1984, was reopened on 24 January 2010, at the cathedral of the Italian diocese of Macerata-Tolentino-Recanati-Cingoli-Treia. Bishop Claudio Giuliodori, the apostolic administrator of the Diocese of Macerata, formally closed the diocesan phase of the process on 10 May 2013. The cause moved to the Congregation for the Causes of Saints in 2014. Pope Francis issued a decree on 17 December 2022 that Ricci had lived a life of heroic virtue, thus conferring on him the title of a Venerable.

== Commemoration ==
Ricci is often commemorated as a symbol of cross-cultural understanding, particularly in the Sinosphere. The following places and institutions are named after Ricci:

- Matteo Ricci Pacific Studies Reading Room at The National Central Library of Taiwan
- Ricci Hall, a dormitory at The University of Hong Kong
- Ricci Building, a building at Wah Yan College, Kowloon in Hong Kong
- The Matteo Ricci Study Hall, at the Ateneo de Manila University
- Matteo Ricci College, Kowloon in Hong Kong
- Matteo Ricci College, at Seattle University
- Colégio Mateus Ricci, Macau
- Sekolah Katolik Ricci 1 and 2 in Jakarta, Indonesia
- Taipei Ricci Institute, Taiwan
- Macau Ricci Institute, Macau
- Ricci Institute for Chinese-Western Cultural History at Boston College.
- The Matteo Ricci Seminar and Matteo Ricci Award at Fordham University
- Centro Matteo Ricci, a centre for refugees and asylum seekers run by the Italian branch of the Jesuit Refugee Service in Rome, Italy
- Matteo Ricci Hall-"R" Hall, Ricci Hall Annex-"RA" Hall, two buildings at Sogang University in Seoul, South Korea

In 2010, to commemorate the 400th anniversary of Matteo Ricci's death, the Italy Pavilion at the Shanghai World Expo in China commissioned Italian sculptor Dionisio Cimarelli to create a monumental bust in his honor. This sculpture was later exhibited for about two years at the Italian Embassy in Beijing. Subsequently, the Marche Regional Government purchased the work, while the original model is now permanently exhibited at the main entrance of the Italian Consulate in Shanghai.

In the run-up to the 400th anniversary of Ricci's death, the Vatican Museums hosted a major exhibit dedicated to his life. Additionally, Italian film director Gjon Kolndrekaj produced a 60-minute documentary about Ricci, released in 2009, titled Matteo Ricci: A Jesuit in the Dragon's Kingdom, filmed in Italy and China.

In Taipei, the Taipei Ricci Institute and the National Central Library of Taiwan opened jointly the Matteo Ricci Pacific Studies Reading Room and the Taipei-based online magazine eRenlai, directed by Jesuit Benoît Vermander, dedicated its June 2010 issue to the commemoration of the 400th anniversary of Ricci's death.

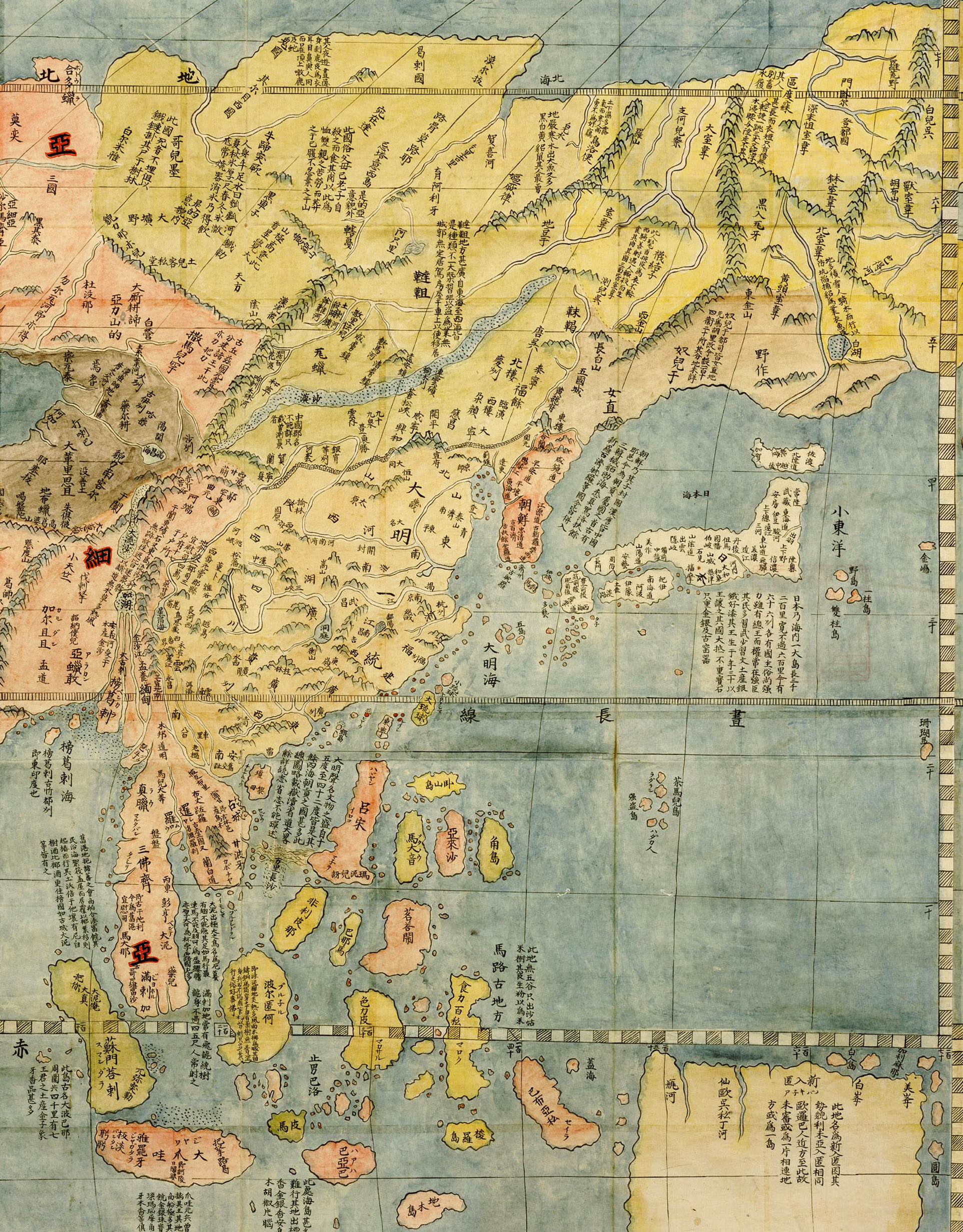
Map of East Asia by Matteo Ricci in 1602

== Works ==
=== The True Meaning of the Lord of Heaven ===
The True Meaning of the Lord of Heaven (天主實義) is a book written by Ricci, which argues that Confucianism and Christianity are not opposed and in fact are remarkably similar in key respects. It was written in the form of a dialogue, originally in Chinese. Ricci used the treatise in his missionary effort to convert Chinese literati, men who were educated in Confucianism and the Chinese classics. In the Chinese Rites controversy, some Roman-Catholic missionaries raised the question of whether Ricci and other Jesuits had gone too far and changed Christian beliefs to win converts.

Peter Phan argues that True Meaning was used by a Jesuit missionary to Vietnam, Alexandre de Rhodes, in writing a catechism for Vietnamese Christians. In 1631, Girolamo Maiorica and Bernardino Reggio, both Jesuit missionaries to Vietnam, started a short-lived press in Thăng Long (present-day Hanoi) to print copies of True Meaning and other texts. The book was also influential on later Protestant missionaries to China, James Legge and Timothy Richard, and through them John Nevius, John Ross, and William Edward Soothill, all influential in establishing Protestantism in China and Korea.

=== Other works ===
Left plates 1–3

Right plates 4–6

Kunyu Wanguo Quantu (坤輿萬國全圖), printed by Matteo Ricci upon request of the Wanli Emperor in Beijing, 1602

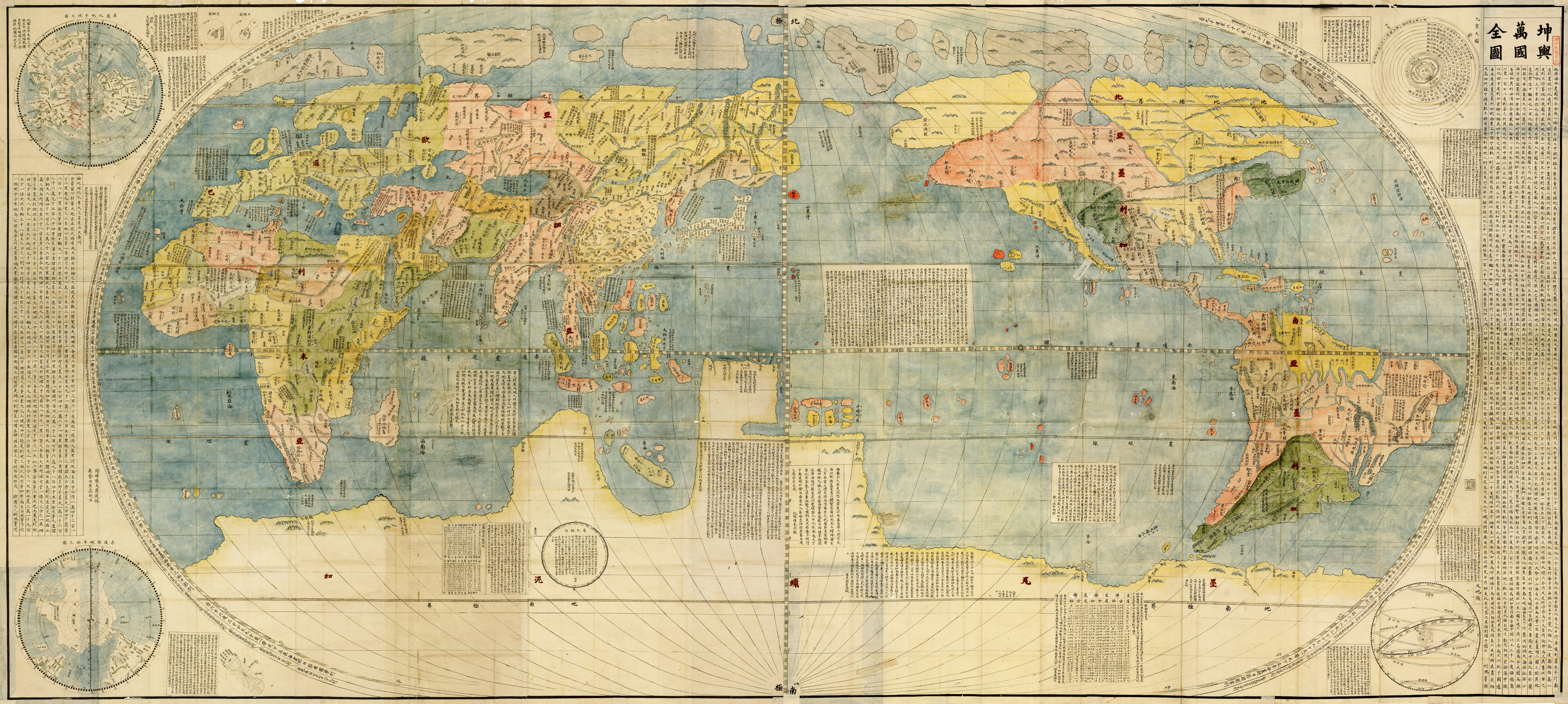
Unattributed, very detailed, two-page colored edition (1604?), copy of the 1602 map with Japanese katakana transliterations of the phonetic Chinese characters

Ricci translated various European scientific works into Chinese. Other works by Ricci include:

- De Christiana expeditione apud Sinas: the journals of Ricci that were completed and translated into Latin by another Jesuit, Nicolas Trigault, soon after Ricci's death. Available in various editions:
  - Trigault, Nicolas S. J. "China in the Sixteenth Century: The Journals of Mathew Ricci: 1583–1610". English translation by Louis J. Gallagher, S.J. (New York: Random House, Inc. 1953)
  - On Chinese Government, an excerpt from Chapter One of Gallagher's translation
  - De Christiana expeditione apud Sinas, full Latin text, available on Google Books
  - A discourse of the Kingdome of China, taken out of Ricius and Trigautius, containing the countrey, people, government, religion, rites, sects, characters, studies, arts, acts; and a Map of China added, drawne out of one there made with Annotations for the understanding thereof (an early English translation of excerpts from De Christiana expeditione) in Purchas his Pilgrimes (1625). Can be found in the "Hakluytus posthumus". The book also appears on Google Books, but only in snippet view.
- An excerpt from The Art of Printing by Matteo Ricci
- Ricci's On Friendship published in Chinese in 1595, translated to English in 2009.
- Ricci's World Map of 1602.
- Rare 1602 World Map, the First Map in Chinese to Show the Americas, on Display at Library of Congress, 12 Jan to 10 April 2010
- The Chinese translation of the ancient Greek mathematical treatise Euclid's Elements (幾何原本), published and printed in 1607 by Matteo Ricci and his Chinese colleague Xu Guangqi
- The Ershiwu Yan or Book of Twenty-Five Paragraphs. A moral treatise published in 1605, the text is a highly redacted and adapted version of the Enchiridion by Epictetus. Ricci took the core ideas from the Enchiridion and condensed them into twenty-five sections. The text is a blend of Stoic philosophy, Christian theology, and Confucian ethics that influenced Chinese converts to Catholicism.

== See also ==
- Christianity in China
- Jesuit China missions
- Religion in China
- Three Pillars of Chinese Catholicism
