= Caritas Bianchi College of Careers =

Hong Kong post-secondary college

Coordinates: 22.3030°N 114.2506°E

- 明愛白英奇專業學校
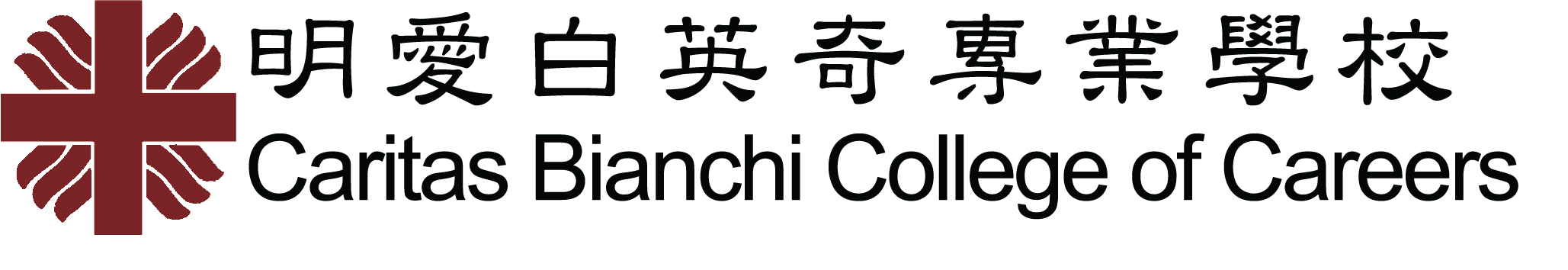
- Other name: CBCC
- Motto: AD Destinatum Prosequor
- Type: Vocational college
- Established: 1971; 55 years ago
- Parent institution: Caritas Hong Kong
- President: Reggie Kwan
- Vice-president: Manhoe Chan, Vice-president (Resources and Finance); Dennis Law, Vice-president (Academic and Quality Assurance); Kat Leung, Vice-president (Administration) and Secretary; Phillips Wang, Vice-president (Research and Advancement)
- Students: 369 (Academic Year of 2014/15)
- Location: 18 Chui Ling Road, Tseung Kwan O, New Territories
- Website: www.cbcc.edu.hk

Chinese name
- Traditional Chinese: 明愛白英奇專業學校
- Simplified Chinese: 明爱白英奇专业学校
- Cantonese Yale: Mìhng'oi Baahkyīngkèih Jyūnyihp Hohkhaauh
Transcriptions
Yue: Cantonese
- Yale Romanization: Mìhng'oi Baahkyīngkèih Jyūnyihp Hohkhaauh
- Jyutping: Ming4oi3 Baak6jing1kei4 Zyun1jip6 Hok6haau6

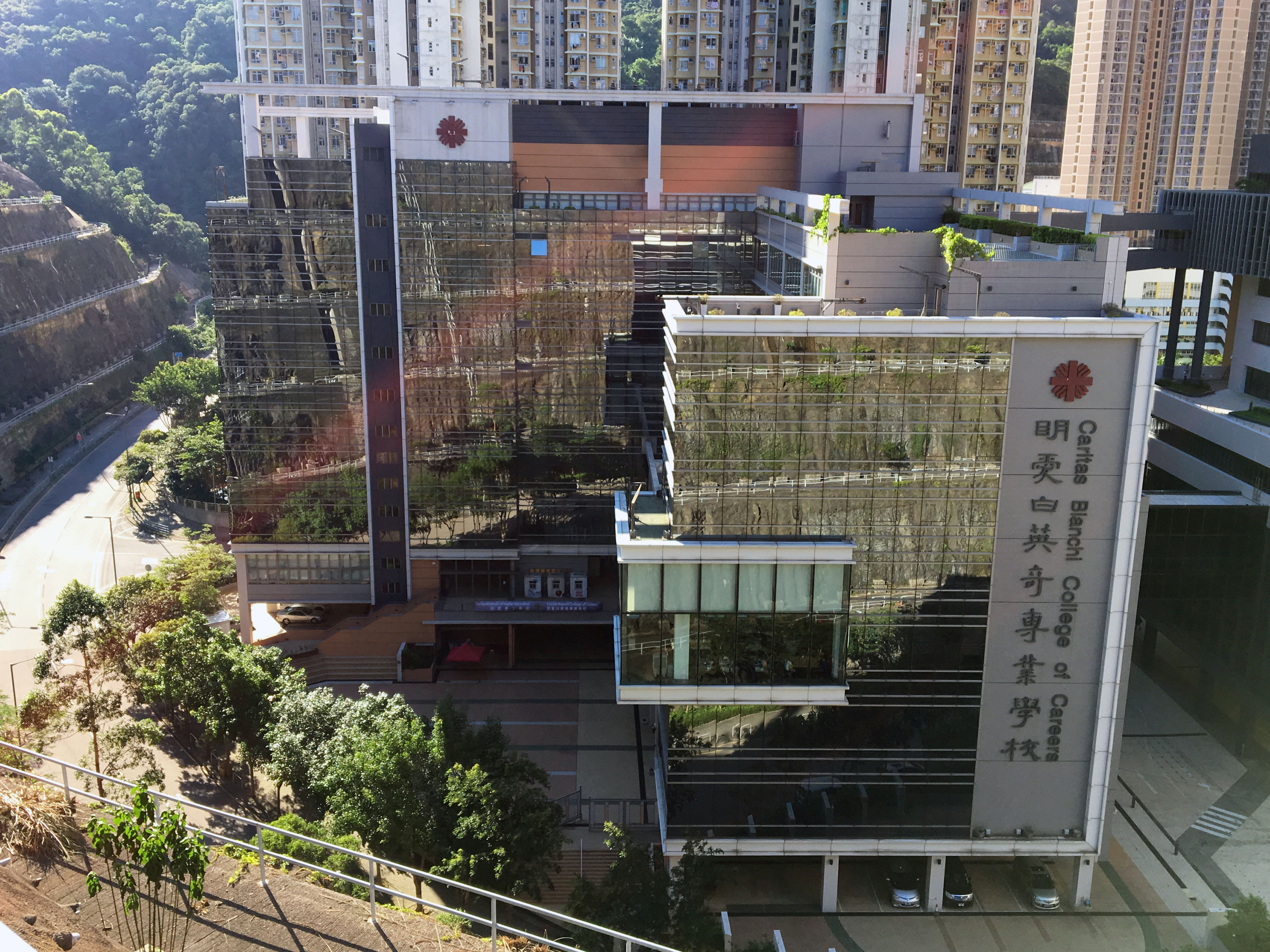
CBCC campus in Tiu Keng Leng, Tseung Kwan O

The Caritas Bianchi College of Careers (CBCC) is a post-secondary vocational college in Hong Kong established in 1971. At present, it mainly offers sub-degree programmes in three general disciplines: business and hospitality management, design and health sciences. It is located at Tiu Keng Leng, Tseung Kwan O, near Tiu Keng Leng station.

== Timeline ==
Caritas Bianchi College of Careers, (formerly known as Bishop Bianchi College of Careers) was founded in 1971 by Caritas Hong Kong. In its initial operation, the college offered a variety of programmes in Accounting, Design, Tourism and Hotel Business at certificate and diploma levels.

In 1997, it became the first institution in Hong Kong and to be granted the approval from the Business & Technology Education Council (BTEC) to offer the two-year BTEC Higher National Diploma (HND) and its foundation programmes.

In 2001, it offered the recognized dual-award Associate Degree programmes in Business and Hospitality Management as accredited by the then Hong Kong Council for Academic Accreditation. In the same year, the College became the first non-University Grants Committee (UGC) funded institution to be registered as an official BTEC registered centre offering a series of BTEC programmes.

In 2002, it offered the accredited associate degree in Design programme. In June of that year, Caritas was given a $15 million "start-up loan" by the Government of Hong Kong to set up a temporary campus for Bianchi College.

In 2004, it offered the one-year top-up Bachelor of Business Administration in Management Programme in collaboration with the Open University of Hong Kong.

In 2005, it offered the one-year top-up Bachelor of Hospitality and Tourism Management Programme in collaboration with the Open University of Hong Kong.

In 2006, it became the first non-UGC funded institution to be granted a piece of land in Tseung Kwan O for the construction of a permanent campus by the government.

In 2007, it offered the one-year top-up bachelor's degree Programmes in the disciplines of Hospitality Management, Fashion Design, Graphic Design and Interior Design in collaboration with the University of Huddersfield.

In 2008, it merged with the Caritas Francis Hsu College administratively to pave the way for the establishment of a catholic university in Hong Kong.

In 2009, the 10-storey new campus in Tseung Kwan O with a floor area of 16,730 sq. m. was in operation.

In 2010, it establish Department of Health Science and planned to offer the Higher Diploma in Pharmaceutical Dispensing Programme.

In 2012, it offered the 2-year Higher Diploma in Pharmaceutical Dispensing Programme.

== Gallery ==
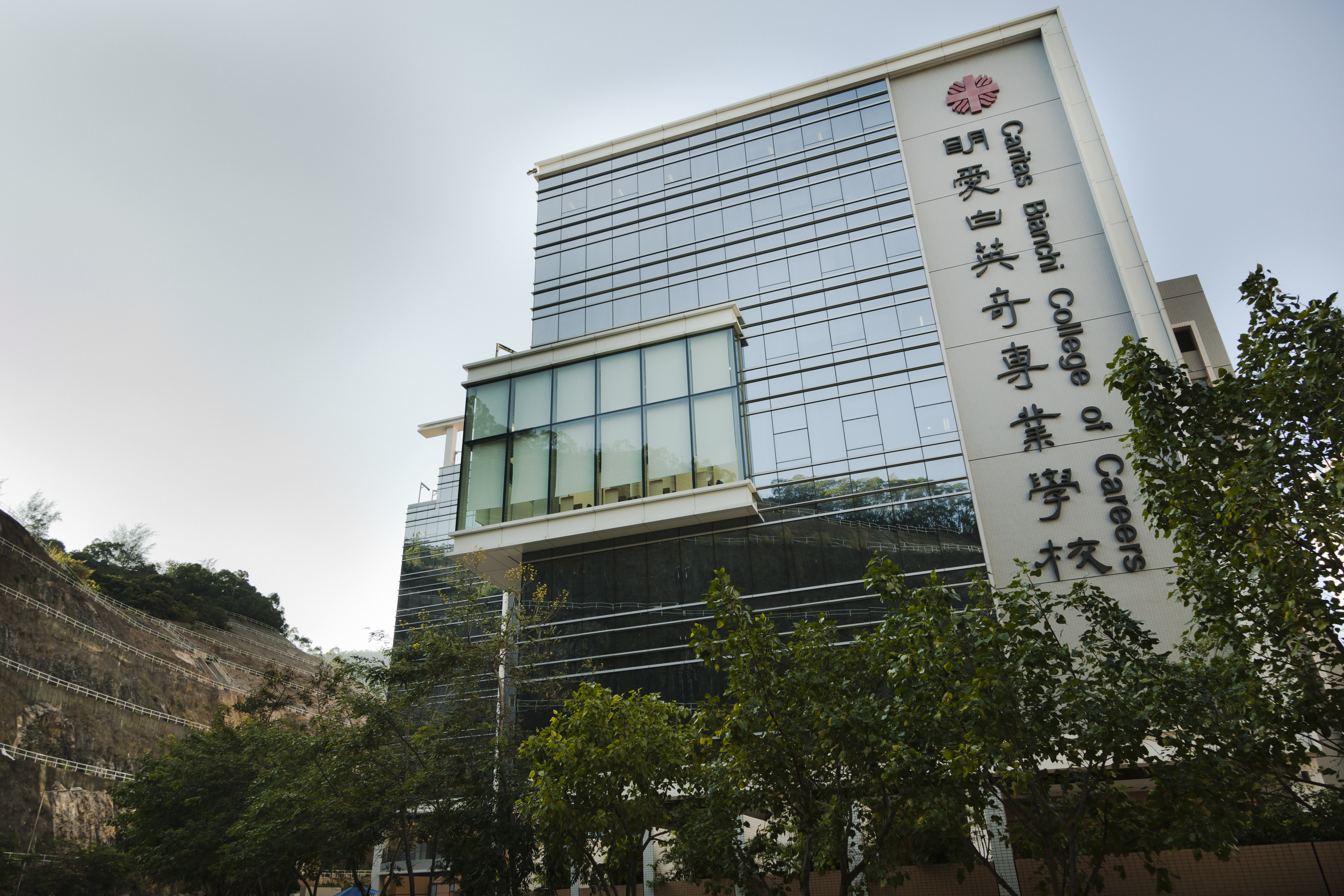
CBCC Campus

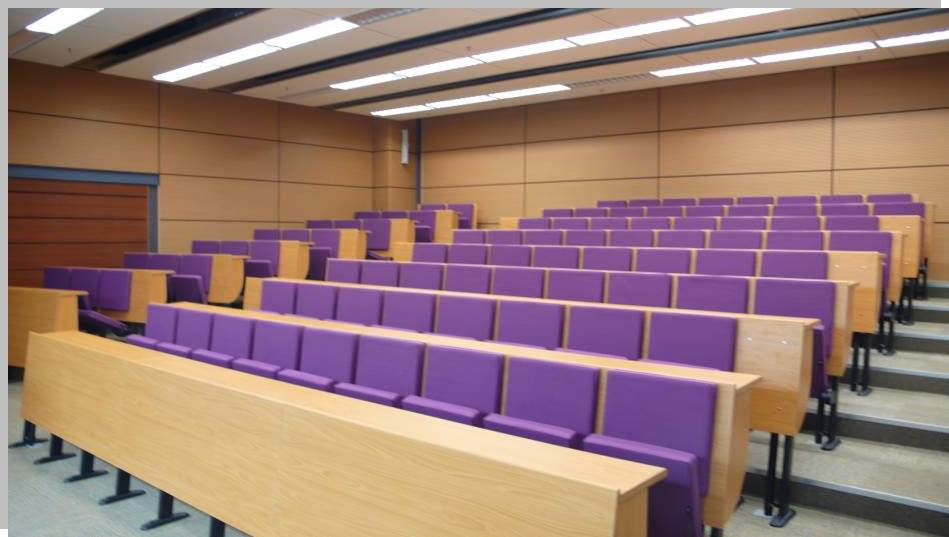
Lecture Theatre

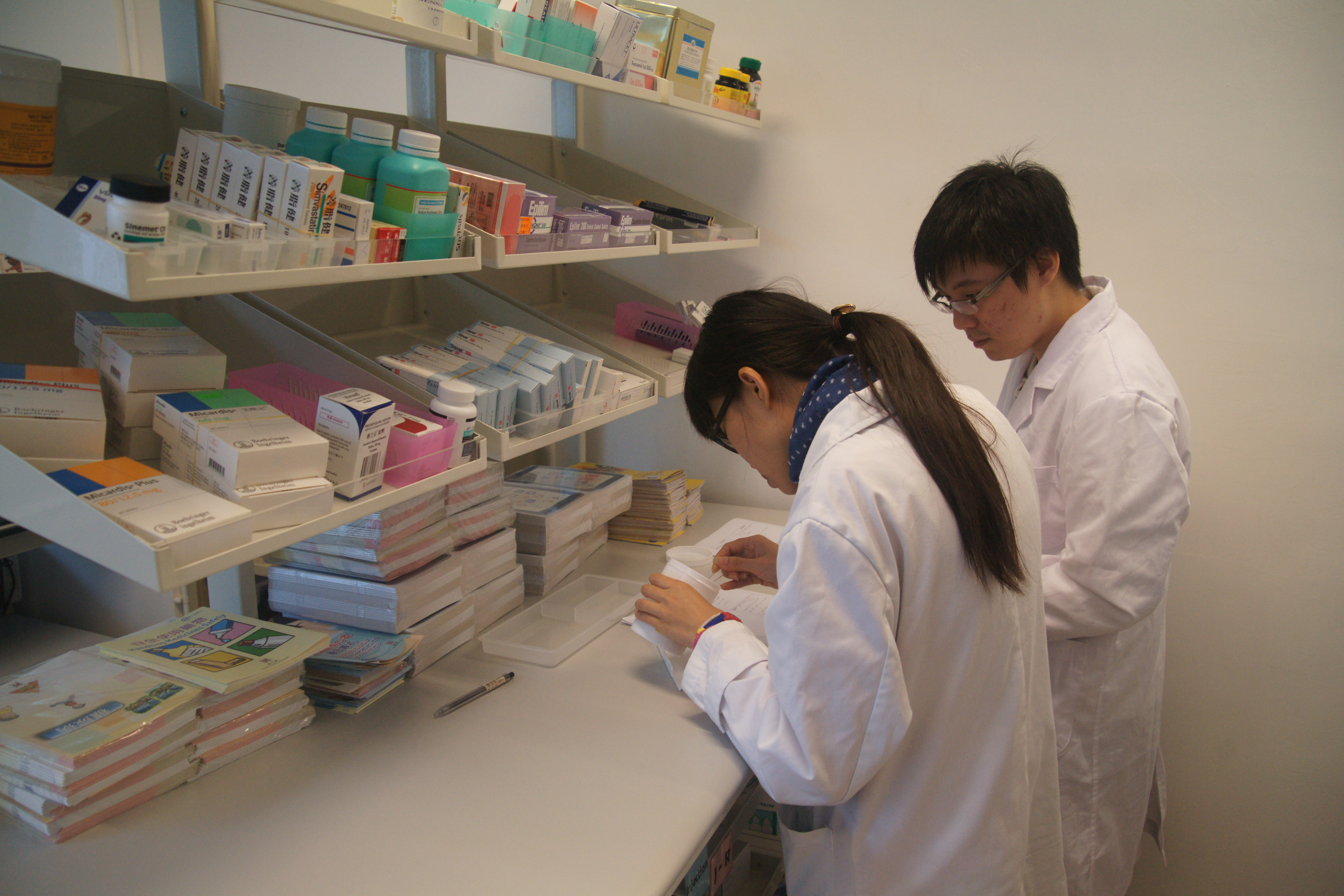
Dispensing Laboratories

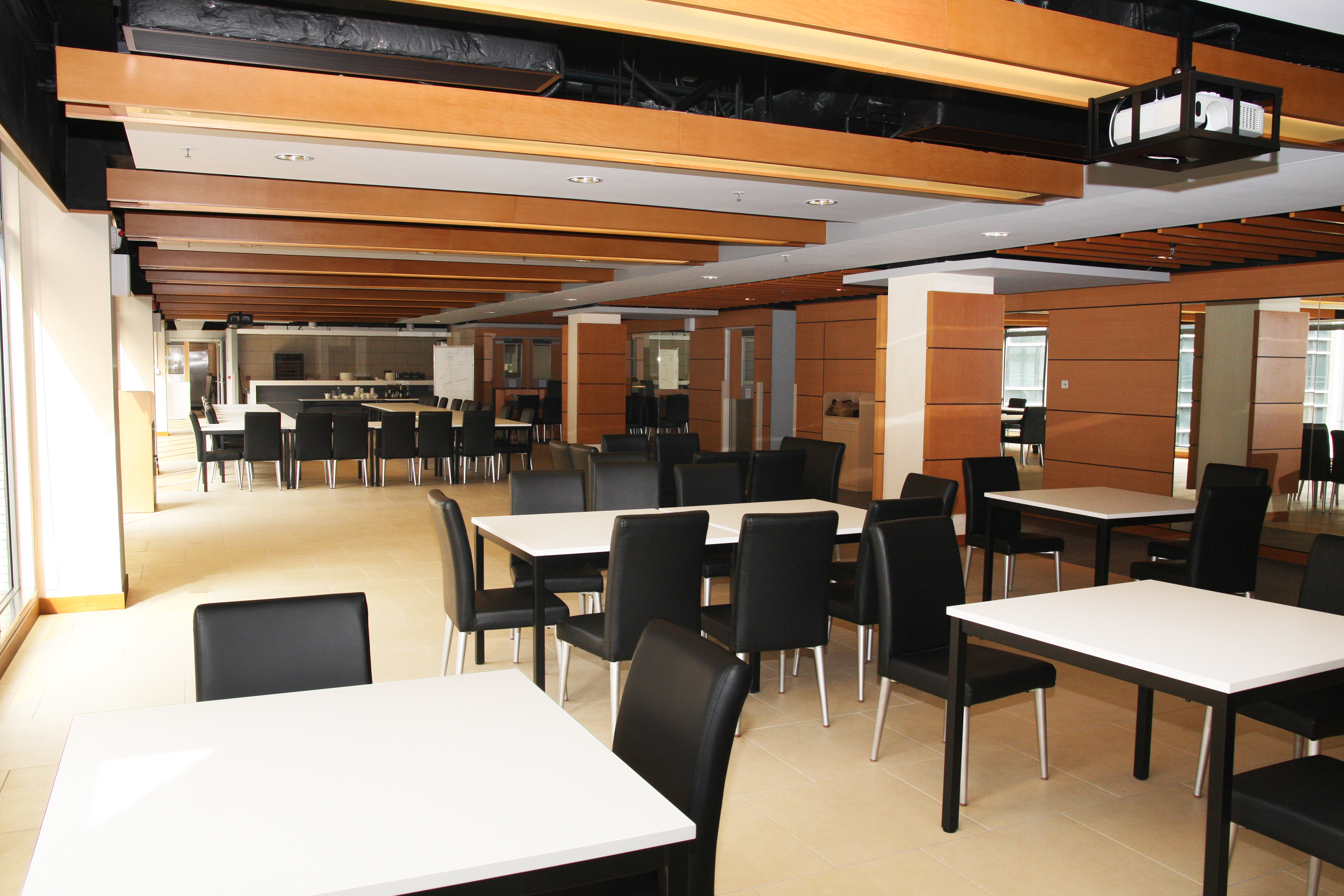
Training Restaurant and Bar

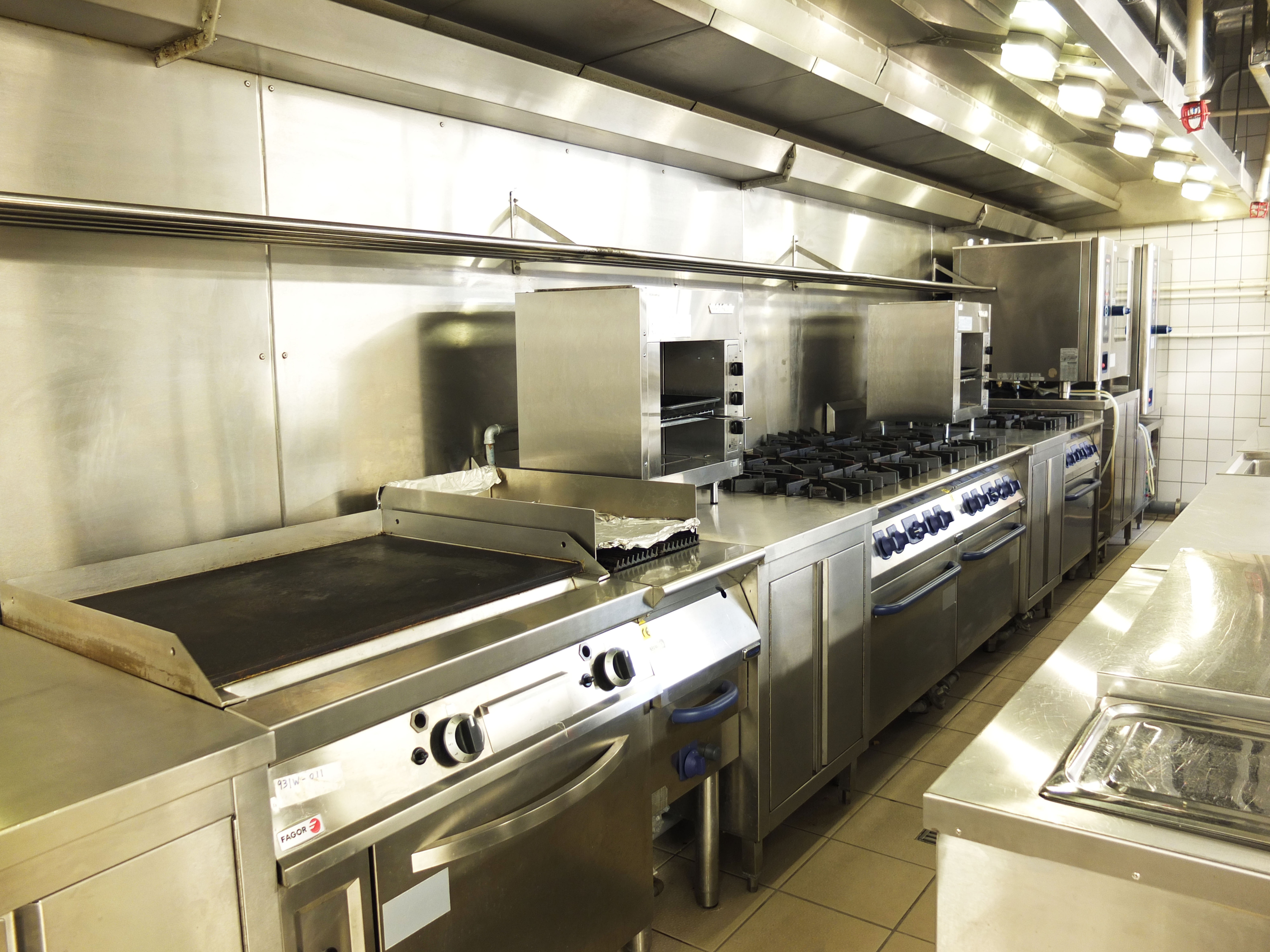
Training Kitchen

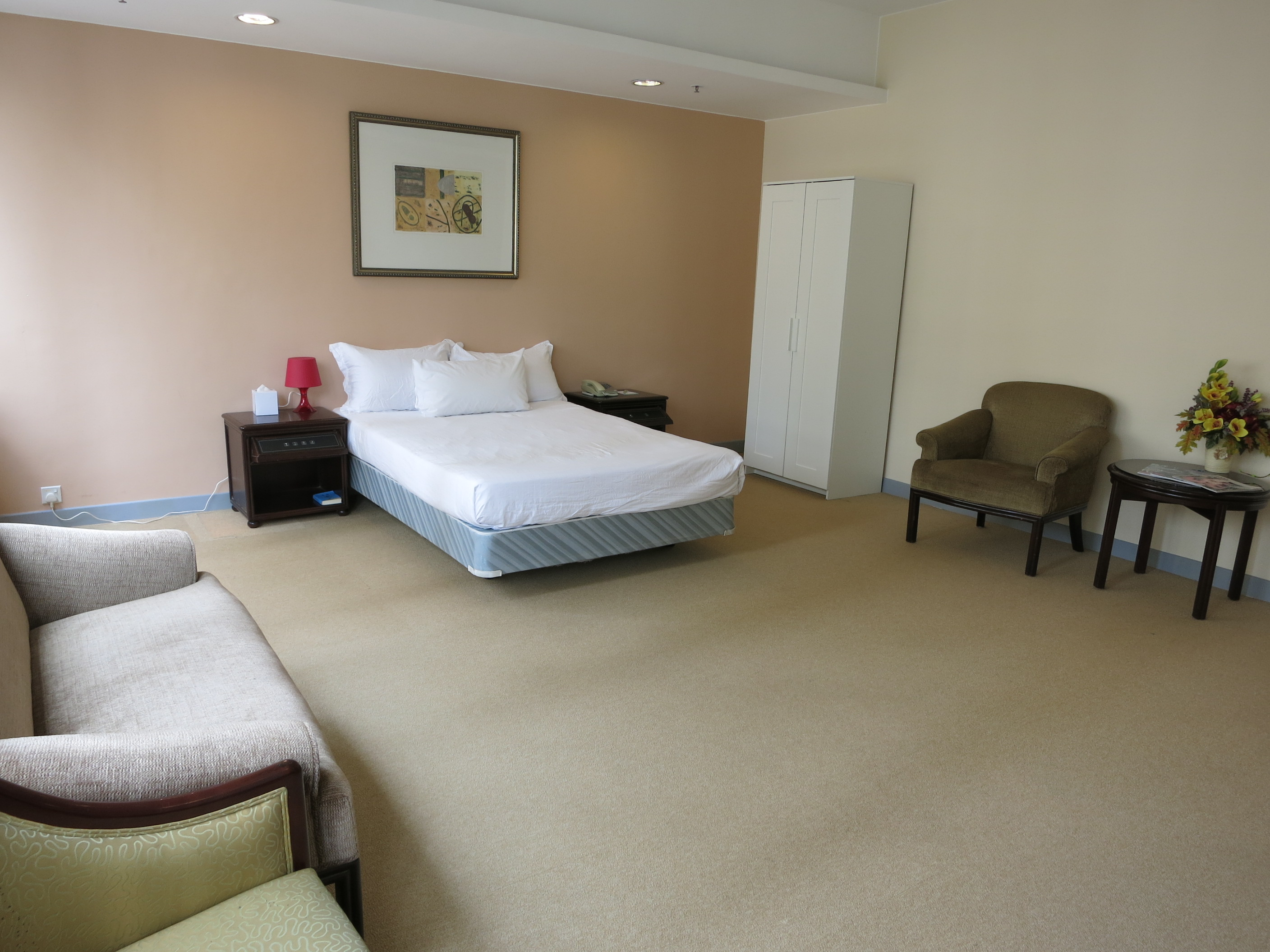
Housekeeping Demonstration Room

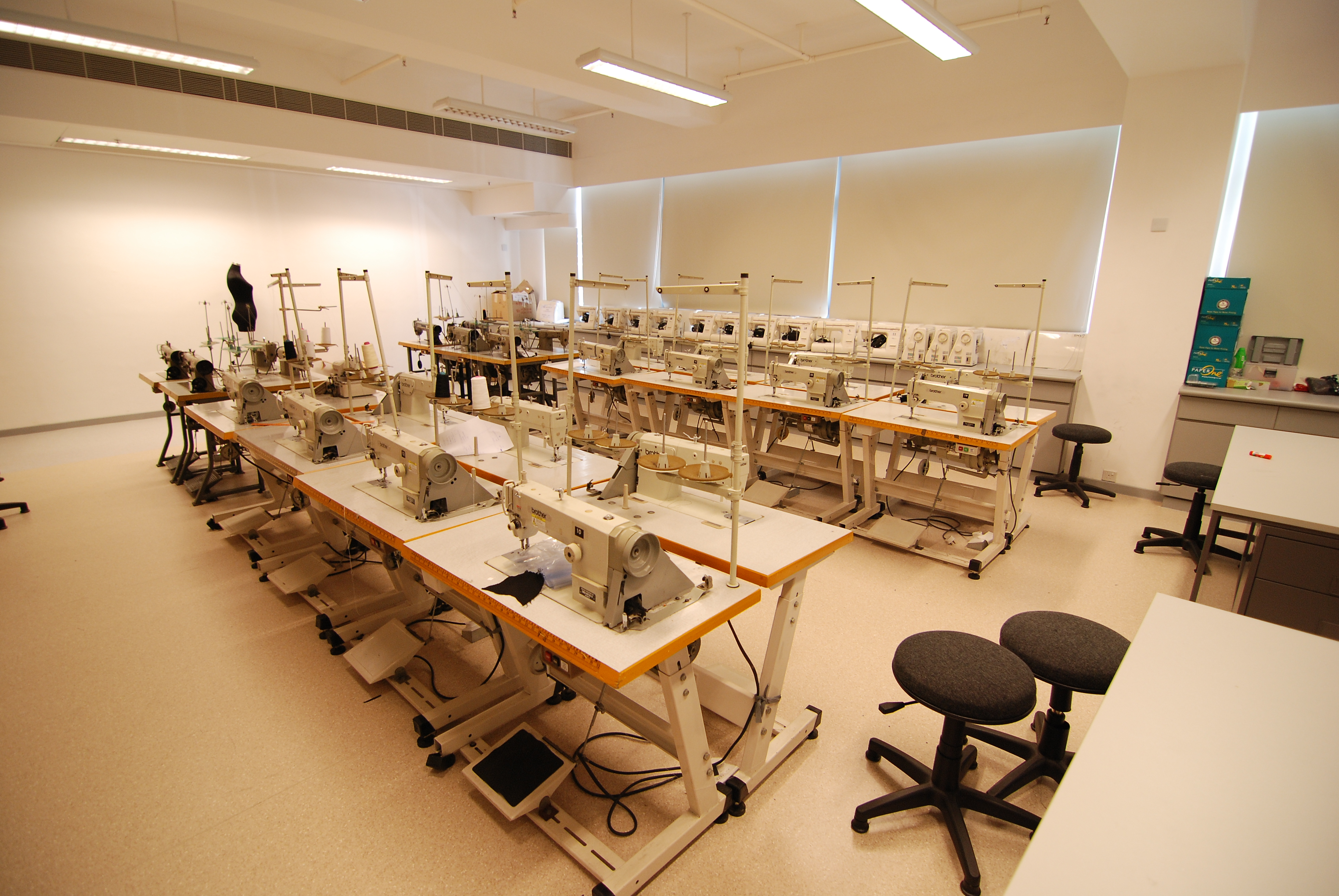
Design Studio

== See also ==
- List of higher education institutions in Hong Kong
- Caritas Hong Kong
