= Grand Ricci =

Chinese–French dictionary

Le Grand Ricci, or Grand dictionnaire Ricci de la langue chinoise (lit. 'The Great Ricci Chinese-Language Dictionary'; traditional Chinese: 利氏漢法辭典; simplified Chinese: 利氏汉法辞典; pinyin: Lìshì Hàn-Fǎ cídiǎn; lit. 'Ricci Chinese–French dictionary'), published in 2001, is a highly comprehensive Chinese–French dictionary, largely focusing on historical Chinese. It takes its name from the 15th century Italian missionary Matteo Ricci.

It is composed of seven volumes of more than 1,200 pages each, identifying 13,500 characters, and about 300,000 entries of terms and expressions. It is, therefore, the largest Chinese–French dictionary yet, and probably the largest dictionary of Chinese into a Western language.

Le Grand Ricci is the most comprehensive up-to-date dictionary of Chinese into a modern Western language, and it has become widely known since its publication in 2001. Though it covers the whole history of Chinese language development, most of the dictionary deals with early and imperial period Chinese-language usage.

It is difficult to imagine any scholar in Chinese studies who will not eagerly welcome this new digital incarnation of the Le Grand Ricci. Le Grand Ricci is to all purposes the most comprehensive bilingual dictionary of Chinese in the Western world. It covers three millennia of the Chinese language, from the Classics to the modern age, and is encyclopedic in its scope. The compilers were able to draw on the full range of French sinological expertise in completing the project. Since its publication Le Grand Ricci has established itself as an indispensable reference tool. Now available online, and easily searchable, its functionality has only further increased.

— Wilt L. Idema, Research Professor of Chinese Literature, Harvard

In May 2010, the DVD version was presented for the first time at the Shanghai Museum. The Ricci dictionary is available as a paid add-on in the Pleco app for Android phones and tablets and Apple iOS.

== History ==
Some of the Jesuits who started the project in 1949:

- Eugène Zsámár s.j. (Hungarian: Zsámár Jenő; 1904–1974)
- Yves Raguin s.j. (1912–1998)
- Claude Larre s.j. (1919–2001)
- Jean Lefeuvre s.j. (1922–2010)
