= Catholic university in Hong Kong =

The idea of establishing Catholic university in Hong Kong was first made by the late Bishop Francis Hsu, a Catholic priest in Hong Kong. By 2015, only Caritas Hong Kong was still endeavoring to achieve this goal, which they achieved in 2024.

== Efforts by Caritas Hong Kong ==
Caritas Hong Kong has been working towards having its two schools, the Caritas Institute of Higher Education and Caritas Bianchi College of Careers, receive self-accreditation status from the Hong Kong government, and then have them become a constituent college of the Catholic University. Caritas Hong Kong aims to establish a Catholic University within 10 years.

By northern summer 2016, a new campus for Caritas Institute of Higher Education will be ready for use. In 2014, school principal Reggie Kwan told reporters the school aims to be recognized as a university by education officials within five years. When that happens, they plan to name the new university "St. Francis University".

On 9 January 2024, the Executive Council approved the institute becoming Saint Francis University, making it the first catholic institute of tertiary education in the city.

== Former efforts by Society of Jesus, Chinese Province ==
On 3 June 2011, the Society of Jesus's Chinese Province announced that it has made an application to the Hong Kong government for a tract of land in Fanling, as a new home for a co-ed, Liberal Arts Catholic university that will host around 3,000 students, all of whom will live on campus, and take courses on Theology and philosophy, among other courses. At the time, the organization announced it has hired a retired American university president as its principal, and other executives have also been hired.

At the time, the Society of Jesus did not rule out cooperation with Caritas Hong Kong, and even stated that students from both schools could be allowed to take courses in each other's institution.

In May 2015, plans by the Society of Jesus to create a Jesuit Liberal Arts College in Hong Kong were cancelled.

== See also ==
- Ricci Hall
