= Ricci Hall =

Coordinates: 22.2839°N 114.1325°E

- Ricci Hall
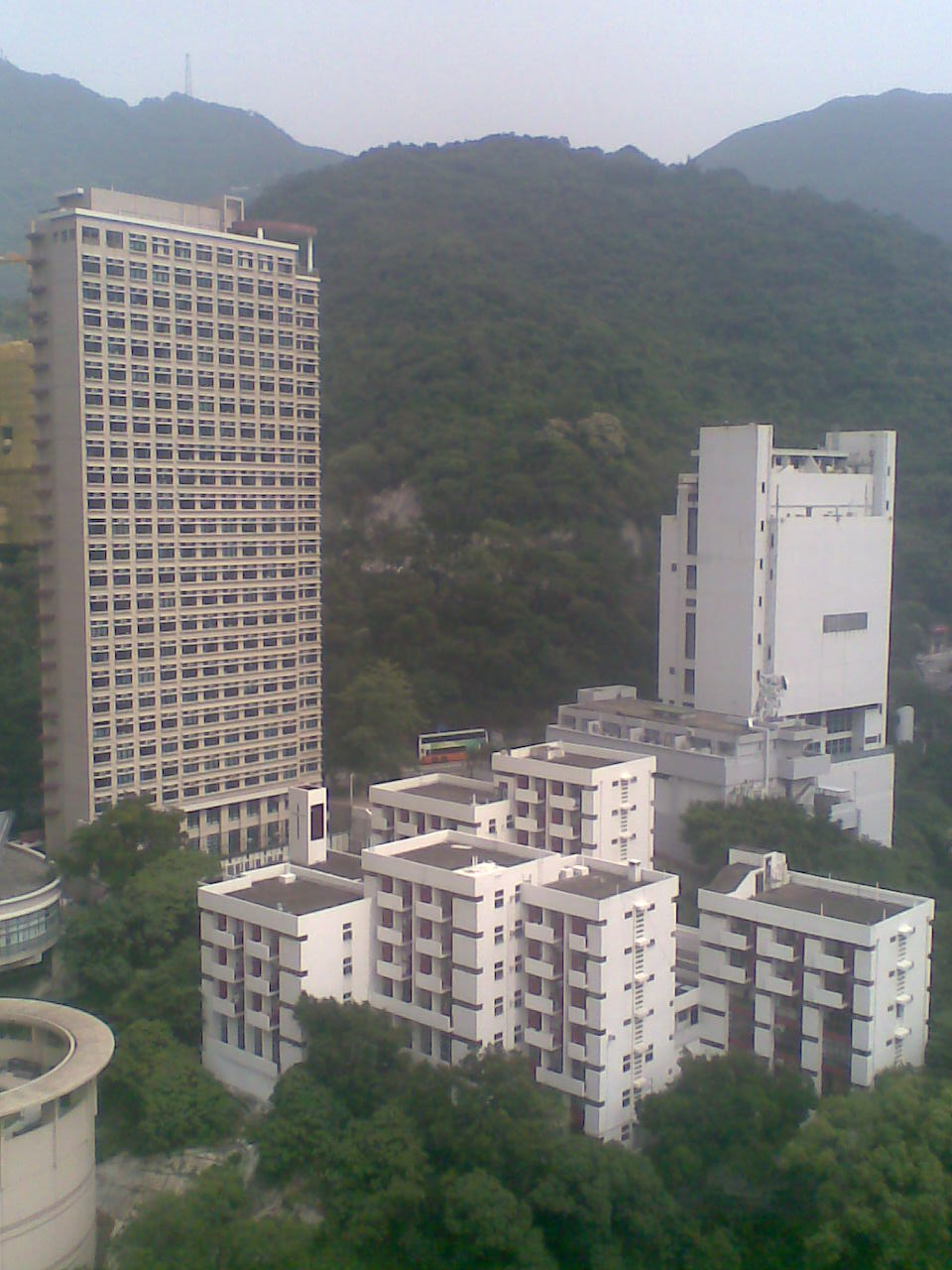
- Ricci Hall (low-rise buildings)
- Interactive map of the Ricci Hall area

General information
- Location: Hong Kong, 93 Pok Fu Lam Road
- Inaugurated: 16 December 1929; 96 years ago
- Renovated: 1990; 36 years ago

Our Lady Seat of Wisdom Chapel
- Our Lady Seat of Wisdom Chapel
- Our Lady Seat of Wisdom Chapel
- Location: 93 Pok Fu Lam Road (利瑪竇宿舍)
- Country: Hong Kong
- Denomination: Catholic
- Website: Official webpage of St. Anthony Church

History
- Founded: 1929; 97 years ago

Administration
- Diocese: Catholic Diocese of Hong Kong
- Parish: Freguesia de Santo António (薄扶林)

Ricci Hall
- Traditional Chinese: 利瑪竇宿舍
- Simplified Chinese: 利玛窦宿舍
Transcriptions
Standard Mandarin
- Hanyu Pinyin: Lì Mǎdòu Sùshè
Yue: Cantonese
- Jyutping: lei6 maa5 dau3 suk1 se3

Ricci Hall (Chinese: 利瑪竇宿舍) is a hall of residence founded in 1929 by the Society of Jesus in memory of Jesuit Matteo Ricci (1552–1610). Located at Pok Fu Lam Road, Ricci Hall is the only Catholic hostel in The University of Hong Kong. In early 1960, it was decided that space of Ricci Hall was inadequate; it should be renovated and rebuilt. On 8 December 1967, the extension of Ricci Hall was inaugurated.

Ricci Hall is a sports-oriented dorm intended primarily for undergraduate students.

== History ==
Ricci Hall Residence, located on Pok Fu Lam Road, is one of the oldest residential halls at the University of Hong Kong. It is a boys-only hall, with great history and deep heritage.

Ricci Hall Residence was officially opened on 16 December 1929 and was established as a residence for students of the University of Hong Kong by the Jesuit Fathers. Located on Pokfulam Road, the Hall was a beautiful old style building with wonderful unobstructed view of the harbour.

It was mainly meant to accommodate Catholic students who came from the Wah Yan College, Hong Kong, Wah Yan College, Kowloon, La Salle College and St Joseph's College, Hong Kong.

Matteo Ricci was chosen as the Patron of the Hall. He is a Jesuit Father famous for his efforts to bring the West to China and China to the West. He is revered for his learning, for initiating a dialogue of cultures and for his knowledge of Chinese literature and philosophy.

In early 1960, it was decided that the space of Ricci Hall Residence was inadequate and it should be renovated and rebuilt. The renovation of the old block of Ricci Hall was completed in 1966, whereas construction of the new block on 8 December 1967.

== Building features ==
Having five separate blocks connected together in order to foster communication among residents, Ricci Hall is unique in the architectural structure. There are total 120 single rooms with a balcony and 16 corridors. The facilities of Ricci Hall include a tennis court, a car park, a dining hall, two libraries, a billiard room, a chapel, a laundry, and 16 pantries at the end of each corridor.

== Motto ==
- Latin: Quantum potes tantum aude
- English: As much as you are able, that you should dare to do
- Chinese: 汝為君子儒 無為小人儒 (論語: 雍也編)

== Emblem ==
Ricci Emblem originated from the emblem in the armour of St Ignatius of Loyola, the founder of the Society of Jesus. The shield in the emblem was divided obliquely: the wolf and hatchet on the right represents Loyola's family and symbolises generosity and hospitality. The helmet on top of the shield symbolises courage, courtesy, honour and spirit of sacrifice. The Latin sentence on the girdle beneath the shield is Ricci Motto.

== Hall Colours ==
Maroon and White

== Students' association ==
All residents are members of Ricci Hall Students' Association Hong Kong University Students' Union (RHSA, HKUSU). The association was established in 1930. Tape Eric Wong is the first Chairperson of RHSA, HKUSU.

== Wardens ==
Ricci Hall wardens:

- Rev. Fr. Daniel McDonald, S.J. (1929-1936)
- Rev. Fr. Brian Kelly, S.J. (1936-1941, 1946-1947)
- Rev. Fr. Fergus Cronin, S.J. (1947-1955)
- Rev. Fr. Herbert Dargan, S.J. (1955-1957)
- Rev. Fr. Richard Harris, S.J. (1957-1962)
- Rev. Fr. Cyril Barrett, S.J. (1962-1969)
- Rev. Fr. D Reynolds, S.J. (1969-1970)
- Rev. Fr. Alfred Deignan, S.J. (1970-1978)
- Rev. Fr. John Russell, S.J. (1978-1990)
- Rev. Fr. Alvaro Ribeiro, S.J. (1990-1992)
- Rev. Fr. Robert Ng, S.J. (1992-1997; 2011-2014)
- Rev. Fr. John Coghlan, S.J. (1997-2010)
- Rev. Fr. John Tang, S.J. (2014-present)

== Prominent Old Boys ==
- 張永霖 Mr. Linus Cheung Wing Lam – Ex-Chairman, Asia Television Limited
- 方心讓 Sir. Harry Fang Sin Yang – Prominent orthopaedic surgeon
- 何鴻燊 Dr. Stanley Ho Hung Sun – Chairman, Shun Tak Group
- 許冠傑 Mr. Sam Hui Koon-kit – Prominent Singer, Actor and composer
- 李柱銘 Mr. Martin Lee – Founding chairman (1994– 2002), the Democratic Party, Hong Kong
- 蘇澤光 Mr. Jack, So Chak Kwong – Chairman of the Hong Kong Trade Development Council
- 孫明揚 Mr. Michael Suen Ming Yeung – Former Secretary for Education, HKSAR
- 黃霑 Dr. James Wong Jum Sum – Prominent Lyricist and composer
- 黃宏發 Mr. Andrew Wong Wang Fat – Former Chairperson, Legislative Council
- 鄔維庸 Dr. Raymond, Woo Wai Yung – Past National People's Congress local deputy
- 余叔韶 Mr. Patrick Yu Shuk-siu – The first local Chinese Crown Counsel
- 梁天琦 Mr. Edward Leung Tin-kei – Spokesman of Hong Kong Indigenous

== See also ==
- List of Jesuit sites
- Catholic university in Hong Kong
