= Li Jinyuan (painter) =

Chinese painter from Chengdu (born 1945)

Li Jinyuan (Chinese: 李金远; born 1945) is a Chinese painter from Chengdu. He specializes in landscapes, using traditional techniques of Chinese ink-wash painting, but he has also devoted much time to oil paintings. He is a retired professor of the Department of Fine Arts, Sichuan Normal University and has been invited to teach and paint in Japan, France, Thailand and Germany. In 2007 he painted The Lenten Veil for the German Catholic charity Misereor.

He has exhibited several times with the French Jesuit Benoît Vermander (a.k.a. Bendu), including in the Réfectoire des Jacobins (Toulouse, 1996), the European Parliament (Strasbourg, 1996), the National Gallery (Beijing, 1997) and the Sichuan Gallery (Chengdu, 1997).

In 1995–1996, at the invitation of the Regional Council, he conducted a series of paintings of landscapes of the Midi-Pyrenees region (Toulouse and surrounding areas). A number of these paintings were reassembled in the Veilleur De Jour collection, published in Toulouse in 1996.

In 2000–2001, for the four hundredth anniversary of the presentation of the missionary Matteo Ricci to the Chinese Emperor (1601), Li Jinyuan departed from Macerata, to follow the trail to Beijing taken by the Italian Jesuit. The resulting series of paintings inspired an exhibition at Sophia University in Tokyo in December 2001.

Between 1995 and 1999, his time spent in France and also in Thailand enhanced the brightness and variety on his palette. From about 1999, he began a stylistic transformation, creating experimental works that mixed Chinese ink with golden acrylic. The oil paintings he created from 2002 to 2003 were characterized by a scarce use of colour and the application of aesthetic principles of contemporary wash painting. The paintings are strikingly dramatic as they were often inspired by the landscapes of ethnic minority areas in Sichuan, which is an economy remarked for its methods of expression.

== Works ==
- Images from the Heart, Aachen Misereor, 2007.
- Misereor, Seilig Seid Ihr: Arbeitsheft zum Hungertuch, Aachen, 2007
- The Divine Quest, Shanghai, Sunbow Art, 2007
- Yuanqi yu liuguang (Breath and Light), Chengdu Contemporary Art Museum, 2002.
- Tianlu licheng (Pilgrim's Progress), Li Jinyuan and Benoit Vermander, Chengdu, Sichuan People's Art Press, 1997.
- Day Watcher /Veilleur de Jour, paintings by Li Jinyuan, text by Benoit Vermander, Toulouse, C.36, 1996
