= Erenlai =

- Discipline: Art, Culture, Society
- Language: English, Simplified Chinese, Traditional Chinese
- Edited by: Cerise Phiv

Publication details
- History: 2006-Present
- Open access: online magazine

Standard abbreviations
- ISO 4: Erenlai

Links
- Journal homepage

eRenlai is a monthly internet magazine concentrating on the cultural, social and spiritual concerns of contemporary Asia and throughout the world. published in English, and traditional Chinese. eRenlai is also a network of readers and project builders who share insights, stories and resources as part of the Pan-Asian community.

== History ==
Renlai magazine (ISSN 1728-5836) was a Taipei-based monthly magazine written and published in traditional Chinese from 2004 to 2013. The magazine was edited by Renlai staff and the Taipei Ricci Institute and was published in association with the French Jesuit review Etudes. Renlai had been the Chinese partner to Etudes since 2005. In 2006, the French sinologist, political scientist and director of the Taipei Ricci Institute Benoît Vermander created eRenlai as an online version of the print magazine. Renlai and eRenlai focus on questions of sustainable development, cultural diversity and the mobilization of spiritual resources in the Chinese world.

== About ==
eRenlai is an Asia-Pacific collection of cultural, social and spiritual concerns and seeks to foster interaction between the youth of Asia and the rest of the world. The magazine's editing line is to concentrate on the link between cultural diversity, sustainable development and spiritual empowerment. Each month's edition focuses on a particular topic and includes documentaries, animations and articles. In addition, new articles and videos are uploaded regularly throughout the month.
