= Benoît Vermander =

French painter (born 1960)

Benoît Vermander (born 1960), also known as Wei Mingde (Chinese: 魏明德) and Bendu (Chinese: 笨笃), is a French Jesuit, sinologist, political scientist, and painter. He is currently professor of religious sciences at Fudan University, Shanghai, as well as academic director of the Xu-Ricci Dialogue Center within the university. He has been director of the Taipei Ricci Institute from 1996 to 2009 and the editor-in-chief of its electronic magazine erenlai. He was a consultor to the Dicastery for Interreligious Dialogue from 2007 to 2025. He holds a M.Phil. in political science from Yale University, a doctorate in the same discipline from Institut d’Etudes Politiques de Paris, a Master of Sacred Theology from Fu Jen Catholic University (Taiwan) and a Doctorate in Sacred Theology from the Jesuit Faculties of Philosophy and Theology of Paris (Centre Sevres).

His research and publications focus on China's model of development and its role in the globalization process, on Chinese religions and spiritual traditions, as well as on the role and status of traditional wisdom, rituals, and civil religion in contemporary societies.

== China's model of development and role in globalization ==
He has highlighted and analyzed the systemic relationship between globalization and the rise of China (La Chine ou le temps retrouvé, les figures de la mondialisation et l’ascension chinoise, Academia-Bruyant, 2008). He has enlarged this research to the external and internal factors explaining the rise of Corporate Social Responsibility in China (Corporate Social responsibility in China, World Scientific, 2014).

His research on the effect of globalization on the Chinese local fabric has also given rise to a case-study on Liangshan Yi Autonomous Prefecture, Sichuan (L’Enclos à moutons, Les Indes savantes, 2007). This case-study was linked to a local developmental project led together with Professor Stevan Harrell, University of Washington, and a group of Yi scholars.

More recently, he highlighted the lessons to be learned from the “First Globalism” (from Marco Polo to Matteo Ricci), contrasting it with past and present imperial temptations. In an op-ed published in Le Monde in February 2025, he warned of the dangers inherent in the reconstitution of alliances between empires modeled after the Triple Alliance.

== Chinese religions and spiritualities ==
Under his Chinese name Wei Mingde, he has published several books in China and Taiwan, some of which are translated from French or English.

Several of his publications deal with the transformations of the Chinese religious landscape and the way Christianity contributes to them while being affected by the trends that redefine China's self-understanding of its cultural tradition (Shanghai Sacred, 2018; Le Christ Chinois, DDB, 1998; Les mandariniers de la rivière Huai, DDB, 2002; L’Empire sans milieu, DDB, 2010). In the latter book and several articles he analyzes how China's religious revival goes along the redefinition of the traditional Chinese religious psyche and societal forms. He also writes on the spiritual dimension of Chinese ancient philosophy and the way its re-interpretation may enrich today's spiritual quest in interreligious perspective. In Shanghai Sacred, published in collaboration with Liz Hingley and Liang Zhang, he combines the study of Chinese religions in urban settings with one of the current expressions of Chinese 'civil religions.'

This research on the genealogy and expression of civil religions is continued, in different context, in Versailles, la République et la Nation, centered on evolving expressions of social sacrality in comparative perspective. In the same line, he has written several contribution on the current trend of “religious sinicization” as well as on China-Vatican relationships.

His book Comment lire les classiques chinois ? (How to read the Chinese classics?) shows the organic unity of the corpus constituted by ancient Chinese classics, built around a reflexive apprehension of our bodily experiences, and traces the way to a shared reading of the classics around which humankind gathers. His research around the Daodejing and its readings across history has been characterized as “an exercise in close reading, a cross-cultural meditation on mystical writings but perhaps, most of all, a work of profound mystical theology”.

== Wisdoms, classics and rituals ==
In several contributions he crossed the study of classical texts with that of rituals and modes of governance of local societies, notably in several Asian contexts, bringing to light the "wisdoms" that the practices of these societies still harbour. This study of the intersections of classics, wisdoms and rituals focuses in particular on the study of civilizational complexes formed around cereal cultures.

== Art ==
Under the art name Bendu, he also creates works of Chinese painting and calligraphy. He studied under the Sichuanese painter Li Jinyuan. In concert with Li Jinyuan, he held expositions at the Réfectoire des Jacobins (Toulouse, 1996), the European Parliament (Strasbourg, 1996), the National Gallery (Beijing, 1997) and Gallery of Sichuan (Chengdu, 1997). He has held solo exhibitions at Fu Jen University (Taipei, 1993), University of San Francisco (1999), The French Institute in Taipei (2002), Chengdu's Academy of Painting and Calligraphy (2002), Beida Centre (Tainan, 2004), Kwanghua Centre (Hong Kong, 2005), the Tibeto-Mongolian Foundation (Taipei, 2008), Sunbow Gallery (Shanghai, 2008), Xuhui Art Museum (Shanghai, 2014), Open Space Gallery in Shanghai (2017), Ancienne Banque de France in Lens, North of France (2019), ICICLE Space in Shanghai (2022) and in Paris (2024), Shanghai Botanical Garden (2025), Fudan Art museum (2025), SoArt Gallery (Shanghai M50, 2025), amongst various other places. In January 2023, his paintings are featured in the opening of the bookshop-gallery "Book Maoxiang" in Suzhou. His works were also the focus of a series of artistic events organized in Parc Hangzhou during autumn 2023. Fudan Art Museum commissioned a roll 40 meters long and 2.50 meters high for its opening in May 2025, a work entitled "The Black Hole of the Unconscious.”

He has published several collections of poems and paintings, in both Taiwan and China.

His art is characterized by the use of audacious calligraphic strokes, the influence of the landscapes and patterns of Tibeto-Burman ethnic groups in south western China and the blending of traditions and techniques.

Some of his works can be seen at this virtual gallery.

=== Artworks and exhibitions ===
- Bendu, A Retrospective Exhibition at Fudan Art Gallery, April–May 2026.
- Translating / Interpreting, SoArt Gallery, M50, Shanghai, June - October 2025.
- 柔之胜刚 The Soft Overcomes the Hard, Shanghai Botanical Museum, April - October 2025.
- 一道更远的光线 Une lumière venue de plus loin, Chengyuan Museum, Chengdu, March - April 2025.
- 生生之道 Natura Naturans, Suzhou, Jilin Lake Museum, October 2024 - December 2024.
- The Allure of the Brush (L'Attrait du trait), Paris, Espace culturel ICICLE, January 19 - February 29, 2024.
- West Lake Script / 西湖剧本, Hangzhou, ArtSpace, August 19 - October 2, 2023.
- The Art of Observing Water / 观水有术. Shanghai, ICICLE Space, 2022.
- Light in the Night. A Dialogue on Art, Philosophy and life between Li Shuang and Benoît Vermander, Shanghai, Shanghai Literature and Art Press, 2019.
- Seeing the Mountain, Drawing the City (with Liang Zhun), Shanghai, Xuhui Art Museum, 2014.
- Taiwan's Color Code (photos albums, bilingual Chinese-English), Shanghai, AZ Cultural Enterprise, 2010.
- Senlin zhong de banmangren (Half-Blind in the Forest), Shanghai, Sunbow Gallery, 2008.
- Youmu jiyi (Nomadic Memory), Taipei, Renlai, 2008.
- Les deux nuits de Jacob (poetry and paintings, French and Chinese), Taipei, Taipei Ricci Institute, 2002.
- Tianlu licheng (Pilgrim's Progress), in collaboration with Li Jinyuan, Sichuan People's Art Press, 1997.
- Chuangsheji (Genesis), Hsinchuang, Fu Jen Faculty of Theology, 1995.

== Distinctions ==
- Corbay Prize (2022), awarded by the Académie des Sciences Morales et Politiques for L'Homme et le grain. Une histoire céréalière des civilisations (Les Belles Lettres).
- Winner of the Annual Best Essay Award delivered by Dao, A Journal of Comparative Philosophy.
- He has been selected in October 2014 as one of the 50 personalities having most influenced the dialogue between China and France in the last 50 years
- Knight in the Ordre des Palmes académiques
- Auguste Pavie Prize (2013) awarded by Académie des Sciences d’Outremer for “Les Jésuites et la Chine”
- Albert Thibaudet Prize (2011) for “L’Empire sans Milieu”

== Selected publications ==
The complete list can be found here.

- 成为黄昏 (Devenir soir/ To become dusk) Shanghai, Wenhui Publishing House, 2026 ISBN 978-7-5496-4689-0
- Comme un arbre vers le ciel, Paris, Salvator, 2026. EAN 9782706730283
- Empty Yet Inexhaustible (Reading the Daodejing with Others). Nagoya, Chisokudo, 2024. ISBN 979-8-3025-9250-7
- 人文与领导力 Humanities and Leadership / Humanités et leadership, Li Shuang 李爽, B. Vermander (eds), Shanghai, Shanghai Commercial Press, 2024. ISBN 978-7-100-23955-4
- Textual Patterns and Cosmic Designs in Early China, May 2024 ISBN 978-1-032-73546-7
- Upon the Rock. The Spiritual Exercises and the Transformation of Christian Existence. (建在磐石上：《神操》與基督徒生活的轉變), Taipei, Manna Culture, 2023 ISBN 978-626-97271-1-7
- The Encounter of Chinese and Western Philosophies. A Critique. De Gruyter, published: September 5, 2023 Open access ISBN 978-3-11-079911-8
- The Power of Ritual. New Perspectives in Social Anthropology. (礼仪之力：社会人类学的新视角), Shanghai, Zhongxi shuju, 2023. ISBN 978-7-5475-2088-8
- Les Exercices Spirituels d’Ignace de Loyola. Une version contemporaine. Paris : Editions Jésuites, 2022 ISBN 978-2-494374-01-0
- Comment lire les classiques chinois ? Paris, Les Belles Lettres, 2022, ISBN 978-2-251-45311-8
- L’Homme et le grain. Une histoire céréalière des civilisations, Alain Bonjean and Benoît Vermander, Paris, Les Belles Lettres, 2021. ISBN 978-2-251-45235-7
- Cereals, Rituals, and Social Structure, In Oxford Research Encyclopedia of Anthropology. Oxford University Press, 2018. Article published April 26, 2021. doi:10.1093/acrefore/9780190854584.013.522
- 《詮釋三角。漢學、比較經學與跨文化神學的形成與互動》[The Hermeneutical Triangle: The Formation and Interaction of Sinology, Comparative Classics and Cross-cultural Theology] 謝華、沈秀臻、魯進、陳文飛 譯。 台北： 台北利氏學社， 2021 ISBN 978-957-29848-8-8, 367 p. Mainland China edition : 诠释三角：汉学、比较经学与跨文化神学的形成与互动; Fudan University Press, 2022. ISBN 978-7-309-15978-3
- Que cette demeure est donc précaire ! De Chine, penser en pandémie, Paris, Lessius, 2020 ISBN 978-2-87299-397-0
- Versailles, la République et la Nation, Paris, Les Belles Lettres, 2018
- Shanghai Sacred. The religious landscape of a global city (with Liz Hingley and Liang Zhang), Seattle University of Washington Press, 2018.
- Dancing over the Bridge. Cross-cultural Dialogue and Encounters (wu zai qiao shang, kuawenhua xinagyu yu duihua, en Chinois), (in collaboration with Lu Jin), Beijing, Peking University Press, 2016.
- Culture et Spiritualité (wenhua yu lingixng, en Chinois) (edited with Claire Shen Xiuzhen), Shanghai, Zhongxi shuju, 2016.
- Corporate Social Responsibility in China: A Vision, an Assessment and a Blueprint, World Scientific, Singapore, 2014.
- Les Jésuites et la Chine, Bruxelles, Lessius, 2012.
- Dialogue as a game (duihua ru youxi), Beijing, Beijing Commercial Press, 2012.(in Chinese)
- A reader of Ancient Roman Religion (gu luoma zongjiao duben), with WU Yaling, Beijing, Beijing Commercial Pres, 2012. (in Chinese)
- L'Empire sans milieu, essai sur la 'sortie de la religion' en Chine, DDB, Paris, 2010.
- Shamanism and Christianity: Religious Encounter among Indigenous Peoples of East Asia (edited by Olivier Lardinois and Benoît Vermander). Taipei, Taipei Ricci Institute, 2008.
- La Chine ou le temps retrouvé, les figures de la mondialisation et l’ascension chinoise. Louvain, Academia-Bruyant, 2008.
- Chine brune ou Chine verte, les dilemmes de l’Etat-parti. Paris, Presses de Sciences Po, 2007.
- Sagesse chinoise et méditation chrétienne. Paris, Arsis, 2007.
- L’enclos à moutons, un village nuosu au sud-ouest de la Chine. Paris, Les Indes savantes, 2007.
- Creeds, Rites and Videotapes: Narrating religious experience in East Asia, edited by Elise Anne DeVido and Benoit Vermander, Taipei, Taipei Ricci Institute, 2004.
- Environmental Protection and Humanist Wisdom (edited by Tyl, D., Vermander, B.). Taipei, Kuangchi Cultural Enterprise, 2002. (in Chinese)
- Peace Education. (ed.), Taipei, Kuangchi Cultural Enterprise, 2001. (in Chinese)
- Les mandariniers de la rivière Huai, le réveil religieux de la Chine, Paris, DDB, 2002
- Heart of Heaven and Heart of Man (edited by Fuxing, D., Shen, V., Vermander, B.). Taipei, Li-hsü publishing house, 1999. (in Chinese)
- Harmony, Exchange and Conflict (edited by Vermander, B.). Chengdu, Sichuan People's publishing house, 1999. (in Chinese)
- Le Christ chinois, héritages et espérance (sous la direction de B. Vermander), Paris, DDB, 1998.
