= List of Roman Catholic bishops of Hong Kong =

Bishops of the Roman Catholic Diocese of Hong Kong

Bishop of Hong Kong
- Bishopric

catholic
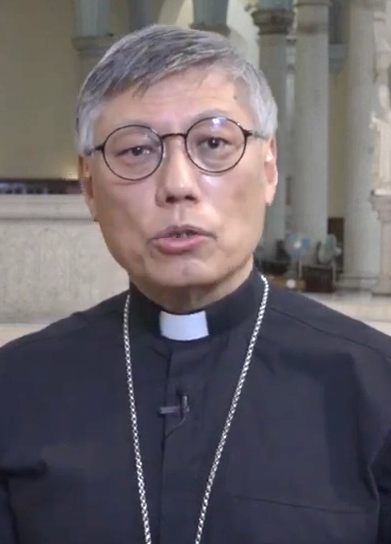
- Incumbent: Stephen Chow

Location
- Ecclesiastical province: Directly subject to the Holy See (de facto); Guangzhou (de jure)

Information
- First holder: Theodore Joset (apostolic prefect); Enrico Valtorta (bishop)
- Formation: 1841 (apostolic prefecture); 1946 (bishopric)
- Cathedral: Cathedral of the Immaculate Conception

Website
- catholic.org.hk/en

The Bishop of Hong Kong is the head of the Roman Catholic Diocese of Hong Kong, who is responsible for looking after its spiritual and administrative needs. The Diocese of Hong Kong is nominally part of the ecclesiastical province of Canton and thus is a suffragan of that archdiocese. However, it has been exempt in practice since 1951, when the People's Republic of China severed diplomatic relations with the Holy See. As a Crown colony of the United Kingdom at the time, Hong Kong was unaffected by this and relations with the Vatican continued unabated. Consequently, the bishop of Hong Kong answers "directly to the Holy See". The current bishop is Stephen Chow.

The diocese began as the Apostolic Prefecture of Hong Kong, which was created on 22 April 1841. Theodore Joset was appointed its first ordinary, and under his reign, the city's first Catholic church was built on Wellington Street. On 2 September 1890, the prefecture was elevated to the status of apostolic vicariate. It was raised to the level of diocese on 11 April 1946, as part of the establishment of the ecclesiastical hierarchy in China under the papal bull Quotidie Nos by Pope Pius XII.

Nine men have been Bishop of Hong Kong; another six were heads of its antecedent jurisdictions. Four bishops – John Baptist Wu, Joseph Zen, John Tong Hon, and Chow – were elevated to the College of Cardinals. Francis Hsu, the ninth ordinary of the diocese, was the first ethnically Chinese bishop of Hong Kong. Tong, whose episcopacy spanned from 2009 to 2017, was the first bishop born in Hong Kong. Wu had the longest tenure as Bishop of Hong Kong, serving for 27 years from 1975 to 2002, while his immediate predecessor Peter Lei held the position for seven months (1973–1974), marking the shortest episcopacy.

== List of ordinaries ==
Key
‡	Denotes bishop who was elevated to the College of Cardinals
MEM PIME	Pontifical Institute for Foreign Missions
OFM	Order of Friars Minor (Franciscan Order)
SDB	Salesians of Don Bosco
SJ	Society of Jesus

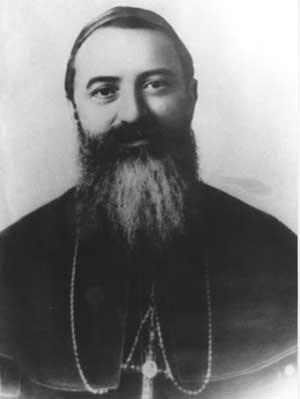
Dominic Pozzoni was Apostolic Vicar from 1905 until his death in 1924.

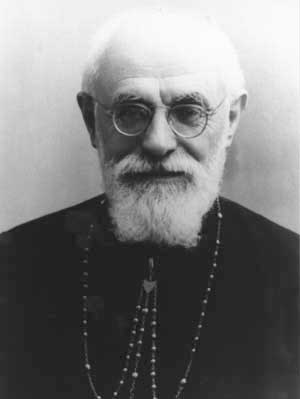
Enrico Valtorta was the last Apostolic Vicar of Hong Kong and its first bishop.

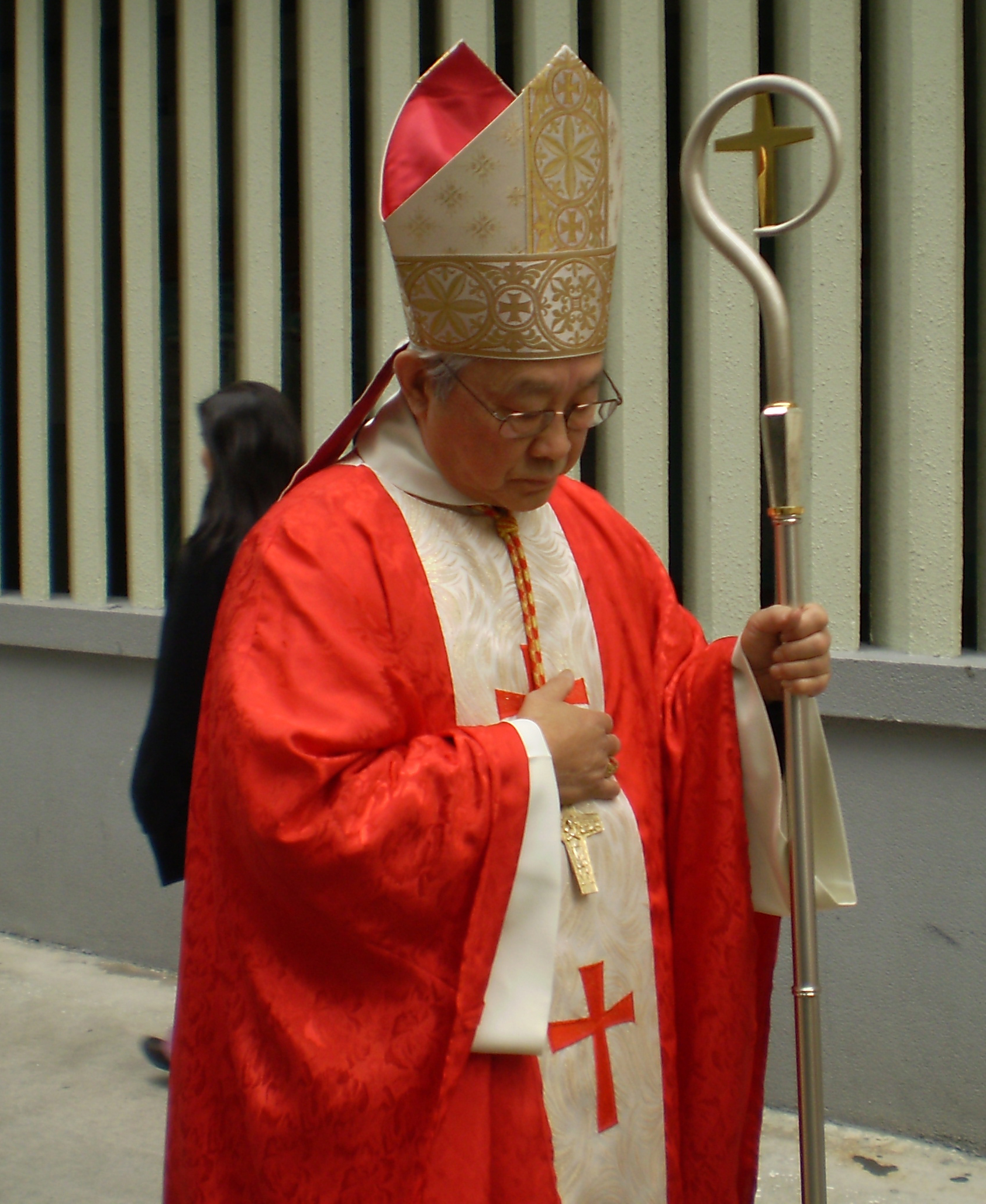
Joseph Zen was appointed coadjutor bishop in 1996, the year before the Handover, to preclude interference from the Chinese government in selecting Cardinal Wu's eventual successor.

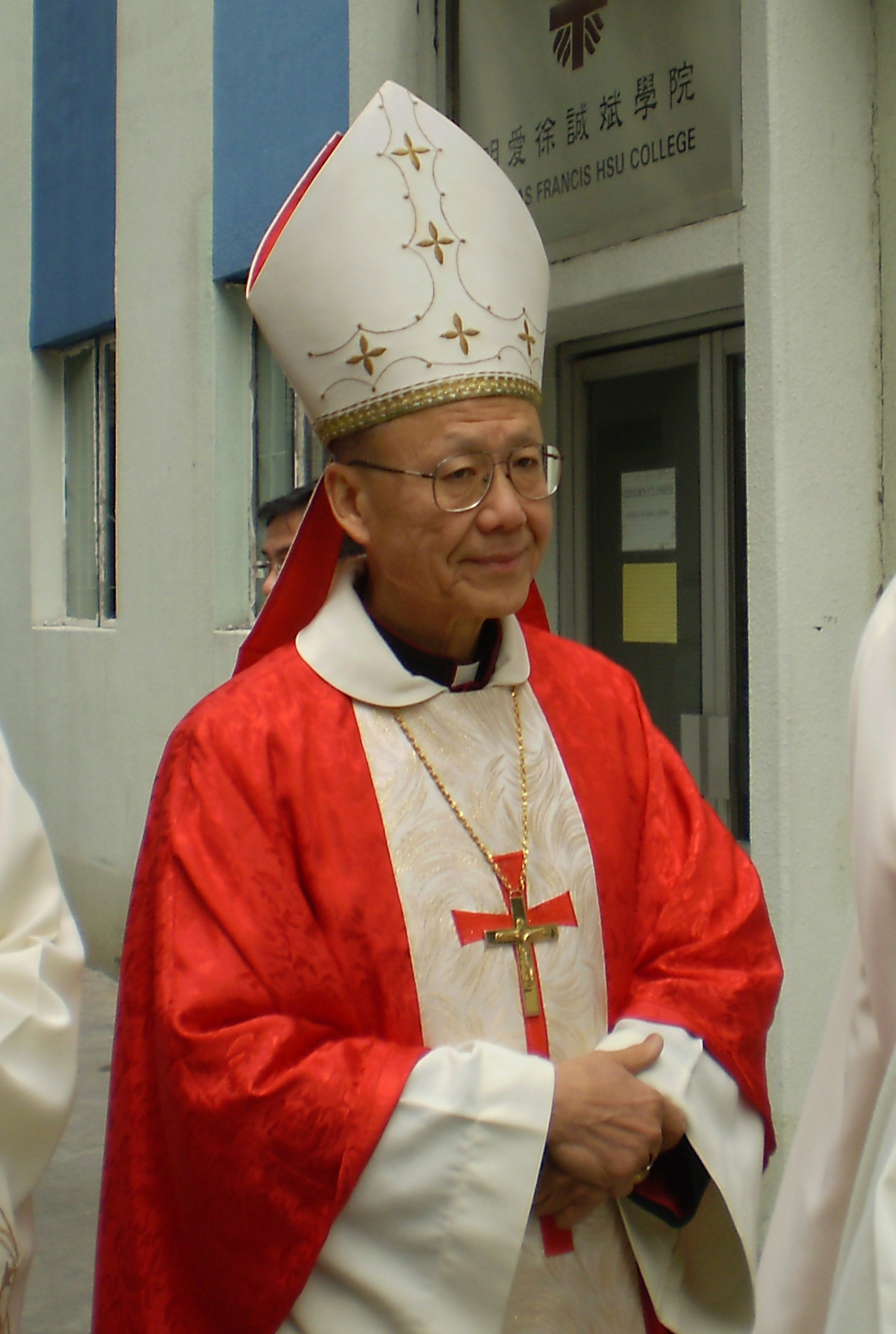
John Tong Hon was the first native-born bishop of Hong Kong.

=== Apostolic Prefects of Hong Kong ===
Apostolic Prefects
From	Until	Incumbent	Notes	Ref(s)
1841	1842	Theodore Joset	Appointed on 22 April 1841. Arrived in Hong Kong on 3 March 1842. Died on 5 August 1842. (Note: Between Joset's death and Feliciani's appointment, the latter served as pro-Apostolic Prefect from 1842 until 1847, followed by Bishop Théodore-Augustin Forcade, MEP (1847–50).)	
1850	1855	Antonio Feliciani, OFM	Appointed on 24 August 1850. Resigned on 20 June 1855. Died on 17 March 1866.	
1855	1867	Luigi Ambrosi	Appointed on 20 June 1855. Died on 10 March 1867. (Note: Between Ambrosi's death and Raimondi's appointment, the latter served as pro-Apostolic Prefect.)	
1868	1874	Timoleon Raimondi, MEM	Appointed on 27 December 1868.	

=== Apostolic Vicars of Hong Kong ===
Apostolic Vicars
From	Until	Incumbent	Notes	Ref(s)
1874	1894	Timoleon Raimondi, MEM	Became the first Apostolic Vicar of Hong Kong on 4 October 1874. Died on 27 September 1894.	
1895	1904	Louis Piazzoli, MEM	Appointed on 11 January 1895. Returned to Italy on 4 August 1904. Died on 26 December 1904.	
1905	1924	Dominic Pozzoni, MEM	Appointed on 12 July 1905. Died on 20 February 1924. (Note: Between Pozzoni's death and Valtorta's appointment, Fr. Giovanni Spada, PIME served as vicar capitular.)	
1926	1946	Enrico Valtorta, PIME	Appointed on 8 March 1926.	

=== Bishops of Hong Kong ===
Bishops
From	Until	Incumbent	Notes	Ref(s)
1946	1951	Enrico Valtorta, PIME	Became the first Bishop of Hong Kong on 11 April 1946. Installed on 31 October 1948. Died on 3 September 1951. (Note: Between Valtorta's death and Bianchi's installation, Fr. Antonius Riganti, PIME served as vicar capitular.)	
1951	1968	Lorenzo Bianchi, PIME	Coadjutor bishop (Note: Under the Code of Canon Law, the coadjutor bishop has the right of succession (cum jure successionis) upon the death, retirement or resignation of the diocesan bishop he is assisting.) from 1949 to 1951. Installed on 26 October 1952, after his release from prison in mainland China. Resigned on 30 November 1968. Died on 14 February 1983.	
1969	1973	Francis Hsu	Auxiliary bishop from 1967 to 1968. Apostolic administrator from 1968 to 1969. First Chinese bishop of the diocese. Died on 23 May 1973. (Note: Between Hsu's death and Lei's appointment, the latter served as vicar capitular.)	
1973	1974	Peter Lei	Auxiliary bishop from 1971 to 1973. Appointed on 21 December 1973. Died on 23 July 1974. (Note: Between Lei's death and Wu's consecration on 25 July 1975, Fr. Gabriel Lam served as vicar capitular.)	
1975	2002	John Baptist Wu^{‡}	Appointed on 5 April 1975. Elevated to cardinal on 28 June 1988. Died on 23 September 2002.	
2002	2009	Joseph Zen, SDB^{‡}	Coadjutor bishop from 1996 to 2002. Elevated to cardinal on 24 March 2006. Retired on 15 April 2009, after reaching the mandatory retirement age of 75.	
2009	2017	John Tong Hon^{‡}	Auxiliary bishop from 1996 to 2008. Coadjutor bishop from 2008 to 2009. First bishop born in Hong Kong. Elevated to cardinal on 18 February 2012. Retired on 1 August 2017, after reaching the mandatory retirement age of 75. Apostolic administrator from 2019 to 2021 following the death of his successor, Michael Yeung.	
2017	2019	Michael Yeung	Auxiliary bishop from 2014 to 2016. Coadjutor bishop from 2016 to 2017. Died on 3 January 2019.	
2021	present	Stephen Chow, SJ^{‡}	Appointed on 17 May 2021. Elevated to cardinal on 30 September 2023.	
