= St. Joseph's Church, Hong Kong =

Catholic church on the Mid-Levels, Victoria City Hong Kong

Coordinates: 22°16′39″N 114°09′29″E

St. Joseph's Church
- 聖若瑟堂
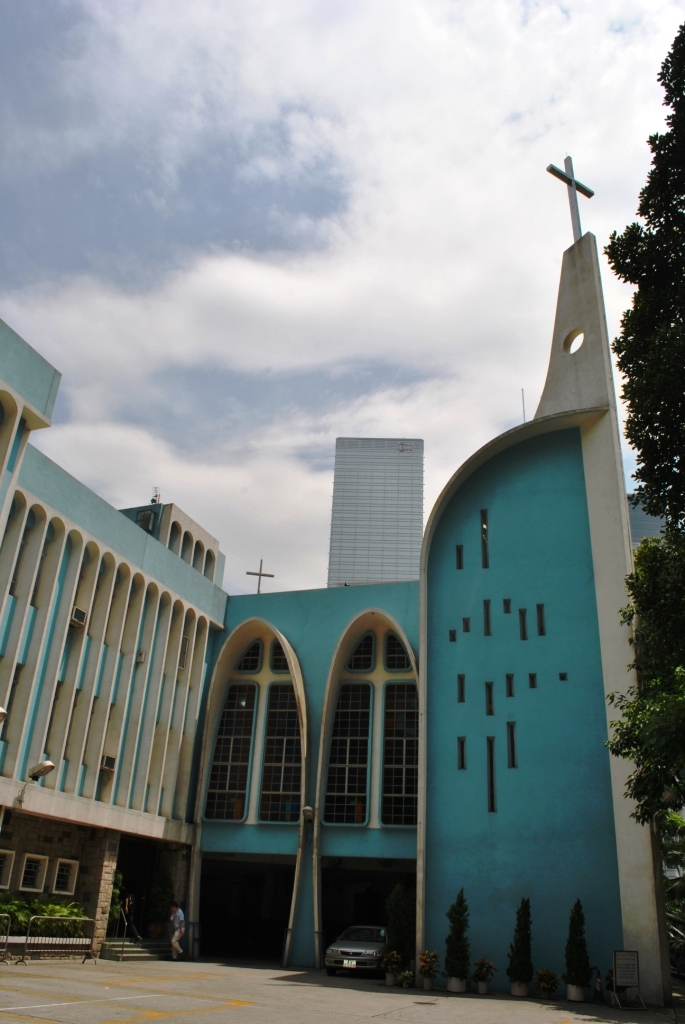
- St. Joseph Church, Central, Hong Kong.
- St. Joseph's Church
- Location: 37 Garden Road, Central, Hong Kong
- Website: www.stjosephs.hk

History
- Status: Parish Church
- Founded: 1871; 155 years ago

Administration
- Diocese: Hong Kong

Clergy
- Bishop: Stephen Chow
- Priest: Joseph Tan Lei Tao

St. Joseph's Church (Chinese: 聖若瑟堂) is a Catholic Church in Garden Road on the Mid-levels, Victoria City, Hong Kong officiated and blessed on 20 November 1872. It was among the three remaining Catholic churches in the colony during the time; the others being the Immaculate Conception Cathedral and Our Lady of Mount Carmel Church.

It was established by Bishop Timoleon Raimondi, the last prefect and the first vicar apostolic of the colony. The construction of the church was attributed to the dedication and efforts of many parties, including the Hong Kong Government, local Christian communities as well as Jewish agencies. It was demolished during the 1874 Hong Kong typhoon, and was later redeveloped in 1876. It was erected as a parish church on 25 January 1949.

== Architectural Detail ==
"St. Joseph the Worker" relief sculpture as seen from Garden Road.

The church was rebuilt in 1966 and the new building opened on 1 June 1968. The front facade of the church features a relief sculpture of St. Joseph by Francis Borboa, where St. Joseph is seen holding a bow saw and a hammer, signifying his profession as a carpenter.

== See also ==
- List of Catholic churches in Hong Kong
