= Raimondi College =

- 高主教書院
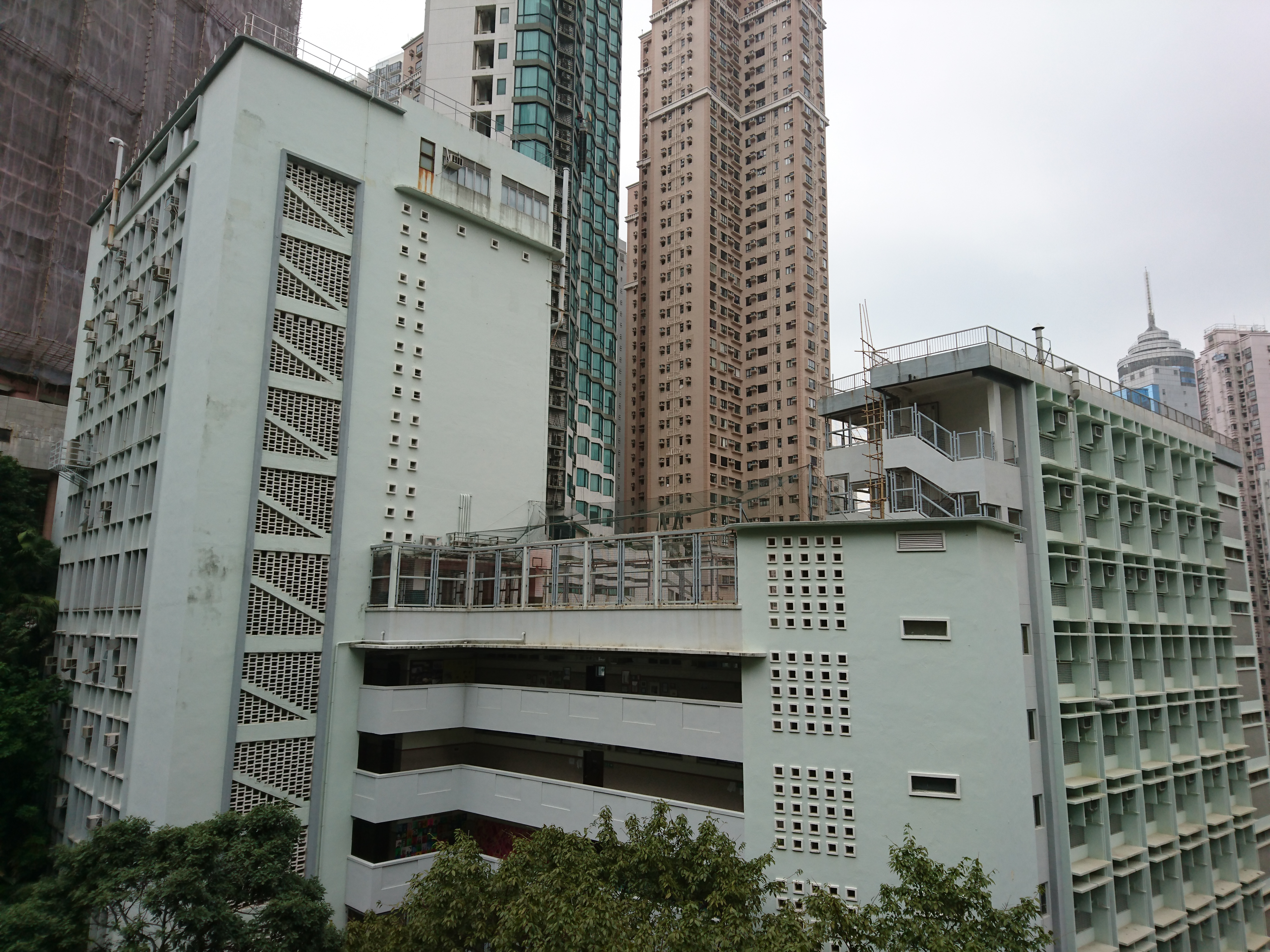

Location
- 2 Robinson Road, Mid-Levels, Hong Kong

Information
- Type: Subsidized School
- Motto: In Constantia Fortitudo (堅毅力行)
- Religious affiliation: Catholic
- Established: 1958
- School district: Central and Western District
- Headmaster: Ho Tai On (何泰安)
- Faculty: Wong Sui Kung
- Language: English
- Area: 10,200 sqm
- Color: Green
- Yearbook: The Raimondian
- Website: www.raimondi.edu.hk

Raimondi College is an English-Cantonese college founded in 1958 by the Roman Catholic Diocese in British Hong Kong. The school building is located at in Mid-Levels West, Central, near the Hong Kong Caritas headquarters and the Cathedral of the Immaculate Conception.

== History ==
=== Founding ===
Raimondi College takes its name from a PIME missionary, Bishop Gao Leimen. Gao was born in 1827. From 1874 to 1894, he went to Hong Kong to preach from Milan, Italy, and became the first apostolic vicar of Hong Kong.

In 1955, Hong Kong Wah Yan College moved to its current Queen's Road East campus in Wanchai. In 1958, when the Pontifical Institute for Foreign Missions celebrated the 100th anniversary of its service in Hong Kong, Raimondi College was built by the then Bishop Lorenzo Bianchi, inviting the visiting Prefect of the Holy See's Communication Department Cardinal Ya Jing’an, who presided over the ordination of the school.

=== Post Founding ===
The Old Student Association, Parent-Teacher Association and Student Association were established in 1961, 1966 and 1969 respectively. During this period, with the completion of the Secondary Six Building (now Block C), three classes of Form Six preparatory courses were opened in 1967. In 1978, Raimondi College became a subsidized school.

=== Recent Events ===
Raimondi College has taught in English since its founding. The Education Bureau officially approved the use of English as the main teaching language in 1998, becoming one of the 114 English-taught secondary schools in Hong Kong.

In 2008, Raimondi College ushered in its 50th anniversary. In the same year, it announced that the primary school would move to Shiu Fai Terrace, Stubbs Road, Wan Chai, which was the former St. Margaret's College campus. The primary and secondary schools were also converted into co-educational schools at the same time.

In 2018, students bid for dry good stalls at Lai Chi Kok government office and managed to secure a stall. They sold customized neon lights, tote bags and stuffed animal toys designed by students.

In 2024, Raimondi College has officially become a Band 1A secondary school in Hong Kong, making it in the top 9% academically of all secondary schools in all of Hong Kong.

== School Campus ==
The school campus is composed of three buildings. The main building is 165 feet high and has 14 floors, the largest in Hong Kong. The secondary school covers an area of 10,200 square meters. It is equipped with 8 playgrounds in total. However, the 8/f basketball playground has been closed temporarily due to fire safety regulations.The school also has a primary school and a kindergarten in Wan Chai and North Point.

=== Location ===
The school building is located at in Mid-Levels West, Central, near the Hong Kong Caritas headquarters and the Cathedral of the Immaculate Conception. Raimondi College is located on relatively elevated terrain. The land belonged to the Cathedral in the early days, and later became the main campus of Wah Yan College in 1921. The site It is still under the management of the Catholic Diocese of Hong Kong.

== School Curriculum ==
There are about 2,100 students in all primary and secondary schools. The school uses continuous assessment to provide appropriate feedback during the learning process to improve learning effectiveness. The school provides enrichment courses for students, such as mathematics group, science group, Chinese debate and English debate.
