= Feliciani =

Feliciani is an Italian surname. Notable people with the surname include:

- Anthony Feliciani (1804–1866), Italian priest and the second Prefect Apostolic of Hong Kong
- Mario Feliciani (1918–2008), Italian actor and voice actor
- Porfirio Feliciani (died 1634), Italian Roman Catholic prelate who served as Bishop of Foligno
