= St. Louis School, Hong Kong =

Coordinates: 22°17′09″N 114°08′15″E

St. Louis School Chinese: 聖類斯中學

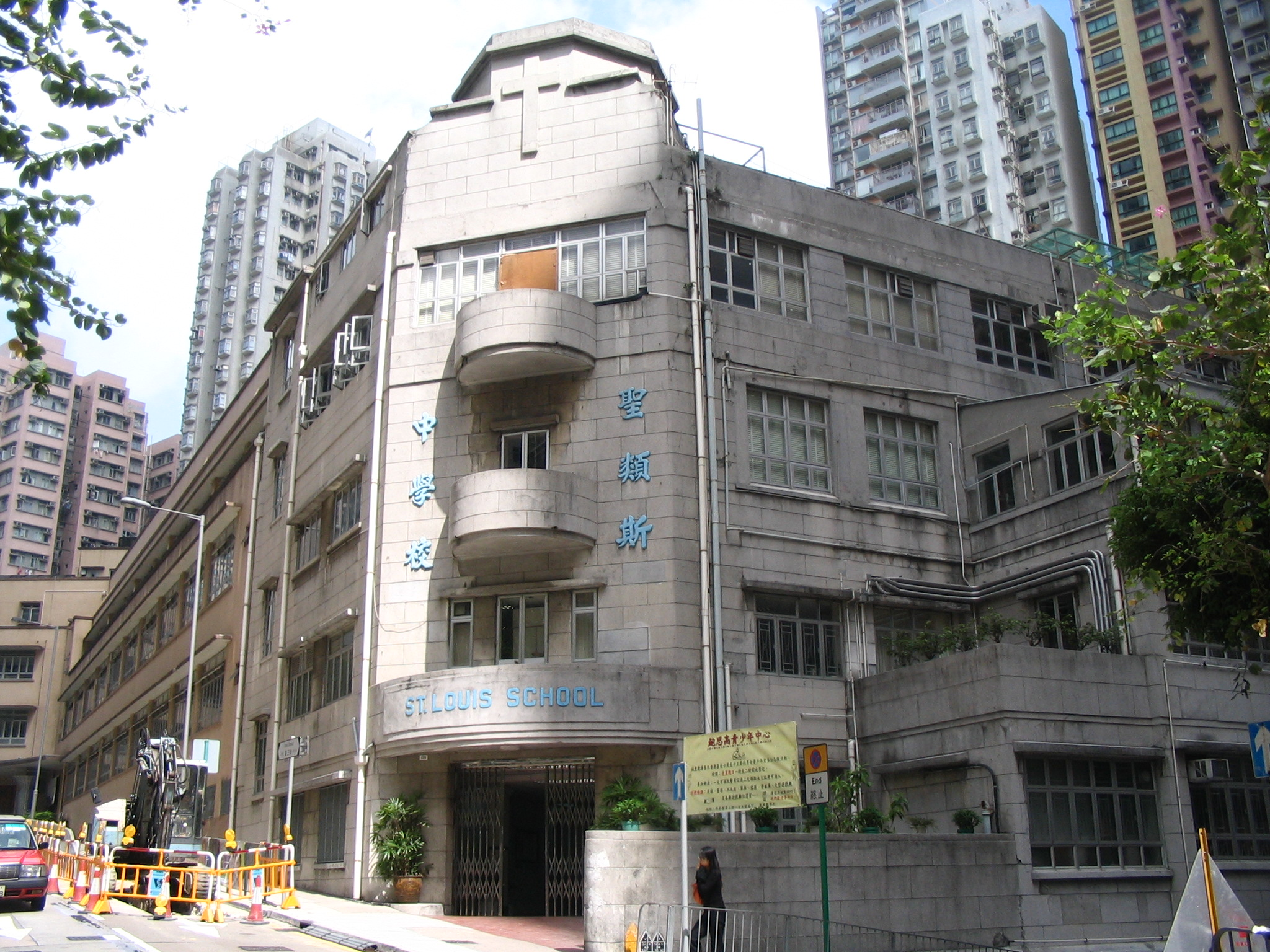
- East Wing of St. Louis School at the corner of Third Street and Kwong Fung Lane.

Location
- 179 Third Street; Sai Ying Pun; Hong Kong

Information
- School type: Grant-in-aid, Secondary school
- Motto: Scientia et Pietas ("Knowledge and Piety"); Chinese: 學問與虔敬並重
- Religious affiliation: Roman Catholic
- Patron saint: St Aloysius
- Established: 1864; 162 years ago (as West Point Reformatory)
- Founder: Fathers of the Catholic Mission
- Authority: Society of St. Francis de Sales a.k.a. Salesians of Don Bosco; Chinese: 鮑思高慈幼會
- President: Rev. Fr. Dr. Matthew Chan Hung-Kee 陳鴻基神父, B.A. (Hons), B.T.(Hons), M.Ed., D.Ed. (Hons) (Supervisor)
- Principal: Dr. Victor Yick Ho-Kuen (易浩權博士) (BSc, PGDE, MEd, MA, DEd)
- Teaching staff: 55
- Grades: S.1 - S.6
- Gender: Male
- Enrolment: 710 (2021 school year)
- Language: English
- Campus size: 10,000 m²
- Houses: Rose, Tulip, Thistle, Shamrock, Lily
- Colours: Red, blue, white
- Song: "All Hail, All Hail"
- Publication: Aloysians; Chinese: 博藝
- Feeder schools: St Louis School (Primary Section)
- Scout Group: 16th Hong Kong Group
- Website: www.stlouis.edu.hk

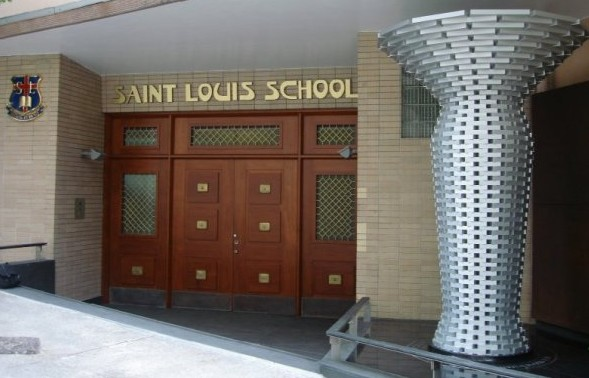
Vase of Champion and entrance along Third Street.

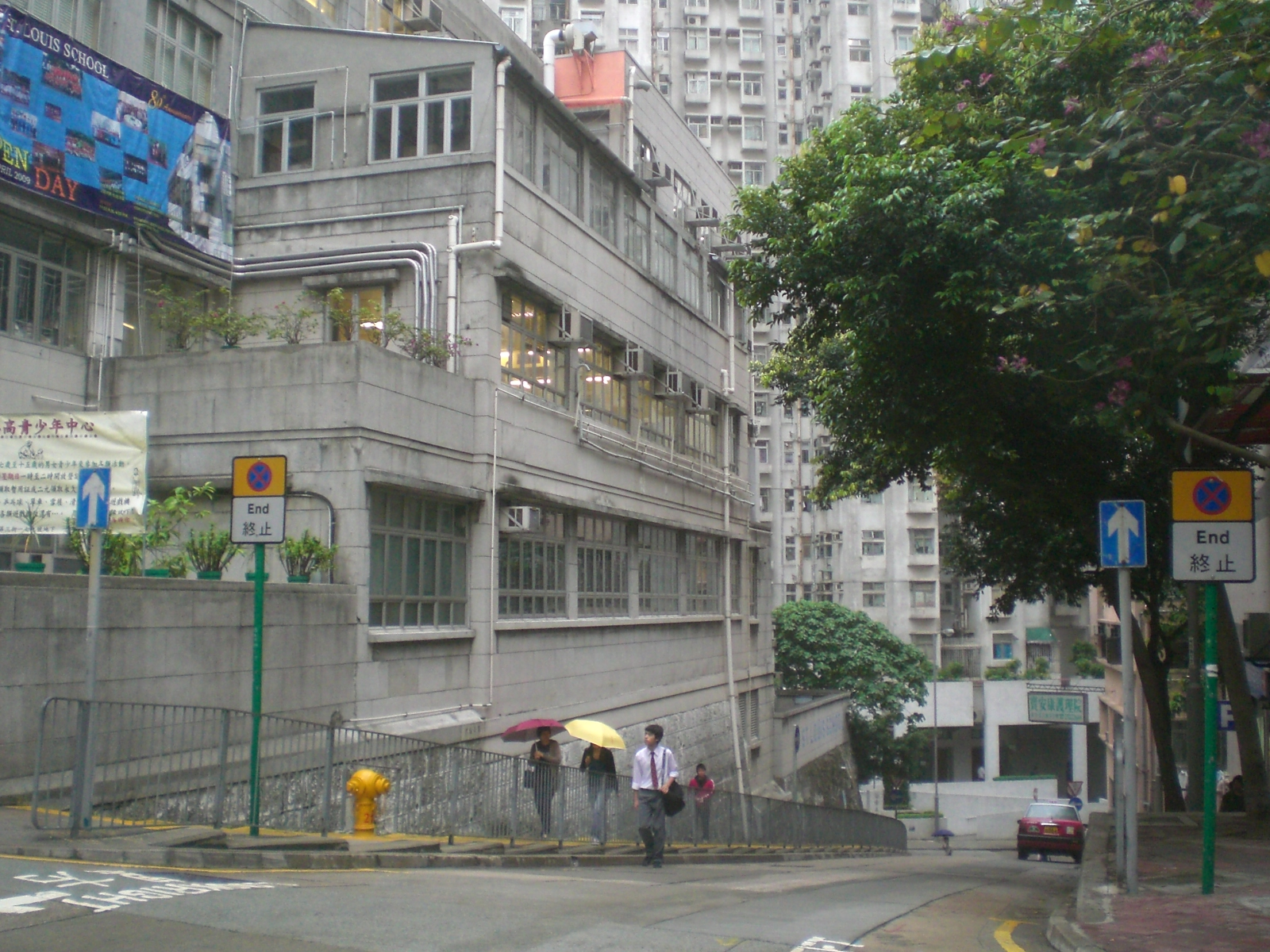
Facade along Kwong Fung Lane.

St. Louis School (Chinese: 聖類斯中學), in Sai Ying Pun (historically West Point, Hong Kong) is a private, Catholic primary and (government-subsidised) secondary English grammar school. There are about 800 secondary students and 350 primary school students.

== History ==
=== Early history ===
During the 1840s, the present location of St. Louis School was the site of a small battery, called the West Point Battery or Elliot's Battery.

St. Louis School was founded in 1864 by the Fathers of the Catholic Mission; St Aloysius was chosen as the patron of the school. The school was initially known as the West Point Reformatory. The Brothers of the Christian Schools (commonly known as the La Salle Brothers) succeeded the Fathers in the management of the school in 1875 and managed the school until 1893.

In 1921, Dominic Pozzoni, the ordinary of Hong Kong, asked the Maryknoll Fathers to take over. Some of the boys were orphans while the rest were remanded by the Hong Kong government, the government giving a small monthly grant for each student. The Maryknoll Fathers renamed the school St Louis Industrial School and equipped it with a printing press. The students became expert in this, and seven years later when the Paris Foreign Missions Society started their polyglot press at Nazareth in Pokfulam, they took into their employ many of these boys.

When Brother Albert Staubli arrived, he added manual training to its curriculum in the way of carpentry. The American Maryknoller Fr James Edward Walsh, who was one of the first four American missioners to arrive in China and the last Western missioner to be released by the Communist China in 1970, spent some time at the school too.

Early in 1926, Maryknoll's father superior and one of the co-founders, Fr James Anthony Walsh, visited to his fledgling mission fields in South China and spent some weeks in Hong Kong before visiting Kongmoon (now called Jiangmen) and Kaying (in Meixian). In the course of his stay, the position of the industrial school was reviewed and it was eventually handed back to the diocese.

=== Salesian Fathers ===
In 1927, the school was given to the Salesian Fathers and has been run by them since then. The year 1927 is now regarded as the founding year of today's school. The school was transformed from a vocational school to an English grammar school in 1948.

== Facilities ==
The school consists of four wings: East, North, Central and West. The oldest one is the East Wing (Block A), which was built in 1936. The North Wing was damaged by a typhoon in 1942, and a new building was subsequently erected. The Central and West Wings were constructed and opened in 1941 and 1967, respectively.

The school's sports facilities include a football playground (with a stand for about 1,100 people), a basketball court and a covered playground.As of 2025 they added a basketball machine that the primary section and secondary section can use

== Principals and Rectors ==
- 1927-1934: Fr Vincenzo Bernardini; 1st Rector and Principal
- 1934-1937: Fr Teodor Wieczorek; 2nd Rector and Principal
- 1937-1946: Fr John Guarona; 3rd Rector and Principal
- 1946-1949: Fr Pietro Pomat; 4th Rector and Principal
- 1949-1955: Fr John Clifford; 5th Rector and Principal
- 1955-1958: Fr Bernard Tohill; 6th Rector and Principal
- 1958-1964: Fr Lam Yum-ching; 7th Rector and Principal
- 1964-1970: Fr John Foster; 8th Rector and Principal
- 1970-1976: Fr Alexander Smith; 9th Rector and Principal
- 1976-1982: Fr Giuliano Carpella; 10th Rector and Principal
- 1982-1988: Fr Luigi Rubini; 1st Supervisor
- 1982-1986: Fr Patrick Deane; 11th Rector and Principal
- 1988-1994: Fr Clement Wong; 2nd Supervisor
- 1986-2016: Fr Simon Lam; 12th Principal; 3rd Supervisor 1994–2016
- 2000-2003: Fr Alphonsus Cheng; 14th Rector
- 2001-2002: Fr Joseph So; 13th Principal
- 2002-2012: Fr Peter Ng; 14th Principal
- 2012–2016: Dr Yip Wai-Ming; 15th Principal
- 2016–Present: Fr. Matthew CHAN Hung-Kee; 4th Supervisor 2016–present
- 2016-2021: Mr Peter Yu Lap-Fun, 16th Principal
- 2021–present: Dr Victor Yick Ho-Kuen; 17th Principal

== Conservation ==
The East Wing of St. Louis School, built in 1936, is listed as a Grade II historic building, "Buildings of special merit; efforts should be made to selectively preserve". St. Louis School is part of the Central and Western Heritage Trail, Western District and the Peak Route.
