= Enrico Valtorta =

20th-century Italian Catholic bishop

His Excellency, The Most Reverend Enrico Valtorta
- Bishop of Hong Kong
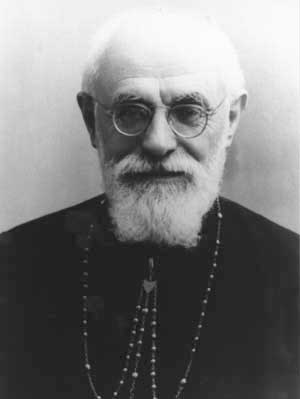
- Diocese: Hong Kong
- Appointed: 8 March 1926 (as Vicar Apostolic); 11 April 1946 (as Bishop)
- Installed: 13 June 1926 (as Vicar Apostolic); 31 October 1948 (as Bishop)
- Term ended: 3 September 1951
- Predecessor: Dominic Pozzoni (as Vicar Apostolic)
- Successor: Lorenzo Bianchi

Orders
- Ordination: 30 March 1907
- Consecration: 13 June 1926

Personal details
- Born: 14 May 1883 (Pentecost Monday) Carate Brianza, Italy
- Died: 3 September 1951 (aged 68) Hong Kong
- Buried: Crypt at Cathedral of the Immaculate Conception, Hong Kong
- Denomination: Catholic
- Motto: Ponere Vitam
- Coat of arms

Styles of Enrico Valtorta
- Reference style: The Right Reverend
- Spoken style: Your Excellency
- Religious style: Monsignor
- Posthumous style: none

Enrico Pascal Valtorta (Chinese: 恩理覺) (14 May 1883 – 3 September 1951) was the last Apostolic Vicar and the first Roman Catholic bishop of Hong Kong.

He was born in Italy at Carate Brianza, and was ordained priest in Milan on 30 March 1907 for the Pontifical Institute for Foreign Missions (PIME).

He arrived in Hong Kong on 5 October 1907 and from 1909 to 1911 was apostolic missionary for Nam Tau (San On District) and Sai Kung (New Territories); Rector of St. Joseph's Church at Garden Road and teacher at seminary in 1913; chaplain to Victoria Gaol (1921–1925). Appointed 4th Vicar Apostolic of Hong Kong on 8 March 1926, was consecrated titular bishop of Lerus on 13 June 1926. Hong Kong Apostolic Vicariate was raised to a diocese on 11 April 1946. Bishop Valtorta was installed as bishop of the Hong Kong Diocese on 31 October 1948. He died in Hong Kong in 1951.

Valtorta College in Tai Po was named after him.

== See also ==
- Catholic Diocese of Hong Kong

Catholic Church titles
Preceded by Dominic Pozzoni	Vicar Apostolic of Hong Kong; 1926–1946	Elevated to diocese
New diocese	Bishop of Hong Kong; 1946–1951	Succeeded by Lorenzo Bianchi
Preceded by Louis Couppé	— TITULAR — Bishop of Lerus; 1926–1946	Succeeded by Emile-Arsène Blanchet
