= Louis Piazzoli =

The Very Reverend Louis Piazzoli
- Vicar Apostolic of Hong Kong
- Diocese: Hong Kong
- Installed: 12 May 1845 (as Vicar Apostolic)
- Term ended: 26 December 1904
- Predecessor: Timoleon Raimondi (as Vicar Apostolic)
- Successor: Dominic Pozzoni (as Vicar Apostolic)

Orders
- Ordination: 1 September 1868

Personal details
- Born: 12 May 1845 Bergamo, Italy
- Died: 26 December 1904 (aged 59) Hong Kong
- Buried: Cemetery of Villa Grugana di Calco of the PIME Missionaries, Italy (1904-2014); Crypt at Cathedral of the Immaculate Conception, Hong Kong since 2014
- Denomination: Catholic

Louis Piazzoli, PIME (12 May 1845 – 26 December 1904) was the Apostolic Vicar of Hong Kong from January 11, 1895 to 1904.

== Biography ==
Born in Bergamo, Italy, Piazzoli was ordained as a priest on 1 September 1868.

Piazzoli arrived in Hong Kong in 1869. He was one of the first missionaries to reach Tai Po. In 1870, he left the mission station in Ting Kok and started his missionary work in Sham Chung, helping the farmers build a dam.

Appointed Vicar Apostolic of Hong Kong on 11 January 1895 and ordained Bishop on 19 May 1895. He died in Hong Kong.

Piazoli's remains were return to Italy, but return to Hong Kong in 2014 to rest at the crypt at Cathedral of the Immaculate Conception.

== See also ==
- Pontifical Institute for Foreign Missions

Catholic Church titles
Preceded by Timoleon Raimondi	Vicar Apostolic of Hong Kong; 1895–1904	Succeeded by Dominic Pozzoni
Diocese restored as a titular see	— TITULAR — Bishop of Clazomenae; 1895–1904	Succeeded by William Cotter
