= Octaba =

Ancient Roman–Berber city in late antiquity

Africa Proconsularis (125 AD)

Octaba was an ancient Roman–Berber city in the province of Africa Proconsularis and Byzacena in late antiquity. Its exact location is now lost, but it was in the Sahel region of Tunisia.

In antiquity, Octaba was the seat of an ancient bishopric which survived till the 7th century. The only known bishop of this diocese is Albinus, who took part in the synod gathered in Carthage by the Vandal king of Huneric in 484, after which he was exiled.

Octaba was restored in name in the 20th century, as a titular bishopric of the Roman Catholic Church. The current bishop is Bernhard Haßlberger, who replaced David Edward Foley in 1994. The current titular bishop Bernhard Hasslberger, is auxiliary bishop of Munich and Freising.

== See also ==
- Peter Lei
