= Antonio Feliciani =

Italian priest

Antonio Feliciani, O. F. M. (Chinese: 裴神父 or 傅安當, 4 October 1804 – 17 March 1866) was an Italian priest and the second Prefect Apostolic of Hong Kong.

== Biography ==
Feliciani was born in Marano, Italy in 1804. He joined the Order of the Friars Minor in 1823 and was then sent to Macau in 1833 as an assistance to the procurator. Afterwards, he was sent to Shansi, China, as a missionary. In 1838, he was recalled to Macau again to assist the procurator and operate a seminary for seminarians from Shanxi.

In March 1842, he and Theodore Joset, the first Prefect Apostolic of Hong Kong, along with other priests and seminarians, were banished from Macau and arrived at Hong Kong. After the death of Joset in August 1842, Feliciani was appointed by the Holy See as the pro-Prefect Apostolic on 19 March 1843, which was intended to be a temporary position.

He led the church out of the many troubles caused by the rather unsettled and confused situation of Hong Kong, and diligently coordinated the mission work in China. To sustain the financial position of the Prefecture, he had made substantial investment in real estates, including a large area in Wanchai such as the present St. Francis Street and Star Street.

On repeated requests from Feliciani himself, he was relieved from the duty of pro-Prefect in Oct 1847 by the Holy See, and handed the responsibility of the prefecture to Bishop Augustin Forcade, who was then the Vicar Apostolic of Ryukyu. However, Bishop Forcade resigned in September 1849, and Feliciani was re-appointed to be the Prefect Apostolic on 24 August 1850.

His administration lasted for about 5 years, and again resigned on 20 June 1855. He left Hong Kong in October 1856 and went to work first in Shantung (from 1856 to 1859) and then in Shansi, where he was appointed vicar general and rector of seminary.

Feliciani died in Shansi, China on 17 March 1866, at the age of 69.

== See also ==
- Catholic Church in Hong Kong
- Roman Catholic Diocese of Hong Kong

Catholic Church titles
Preceded by Theodore Joset	Prefect Apostolic of Hong Kong; 1842–1847 (ad interim)	Succeeded by Théodore Augustin Forcade
Preceded by Théodore Augustin Forcade	Prefect Apostolic of Hong Kong; 1850–1855 (ad interim)	Succeeded by Aloysius Ambrosi
