= Peter Lei =

His Excellency, The Most Reverend Peter Lei
- Bishop of Hong Kong
- Diocese: Hong Kong
- Installed: 22 April 1974
- Term ended: 23 July 1974
- Predecessor: Francis Hsu
- Successor: John Baptist Wu
- Previous posts: Auxiliary Bishop of Hong Kong (1971–1973); Titular Bishop of Octaba (1971–1973)

Orders
- Ordination: 6 July 1952 by Antonio Riberi
- Consecration: 8 September 1971 by Francis Hsu

Personal details
- Born: 29 March 1922 Canton, Republic of China
- Died: 23 July 1974 (aged 52) St Paul's Hospital, Causeway Bay, British Hong Kong
- Buried: Crypt at Cathedral of the Immaculate Conception, Hong Kong
- Denomination: Catholic
- Residence: Hong Kong
- Education: Regional Seminary of South China
- Motto: Per Crucem Ad Lucem
- Coat of arms: Peter Lei's coat of arms

Styles of Peter Lei
- Reference style: His Excellency; The Most Reverend
- Spoken style: Your Excellency
- Religious style: Bishop

Ordination history of Peter Lei
History
Priestly ordination
- Ordained by: Antonio Riberi
- Date: June 26, 1955
Episcopal consecration
- Principal consecrator: Francis Hsu
- Co-consecrators: Stanislaus Lo Kuang, Paulo José Tavares
- Date: September 8, 1971
- Place: Cathedral of the Immaculate Conception, Hong Kong

Bishop Peter Lei Wang-Kei (李宏基主教; 29 March 1922 – 23 July 1974) was the fourth Roman Catholic bishop of Hong Kong.

== Biography ==
Born in Nam Hoi, Canton, Lei was ordained priest on 6 July 1955 and appointed Auxiliary Bishop of Hong Kong 3 July 1971, appointed Titular Bishop of Octaba 8 September 1971.

He was sworn in as the Vicar Capitular on 23 May 1973. Appointed Bishop of Hong Kong on 21 December 1973 and installed on 22 April 1974, he died not long afterwards on 23 July 1974 of sudden heart attack.

His remains were buried in St. Michael's Cemetery in Happy Valley, and later exhumed and re-buried in the Crypt at the Cathedral of the Immaculate Conception.

== See also ==
- Catholic Diocese of Hong Kong

Catholic Church titles
Vacant Title last held by Francis Hsu	Auxiliary Bishop of Hong Kong; 1971–1973	Vacant Title next held by John Tong
Preceded by Francis Hsu	Bishop of Hong Kong; 1973–1974	Succeeded by John Baptist Wu
Preceded by Ernesto Sena de Oliveira	— TITULAR — Bishop of Octaba; 1971–1973	Succeeded by David Edward Foley
