= Dominic Pozzoni =

Italian bishop (1861–1924)

The Most Reverend Dominic Pozzoni
- Vicar Apostolic of Hong Kong
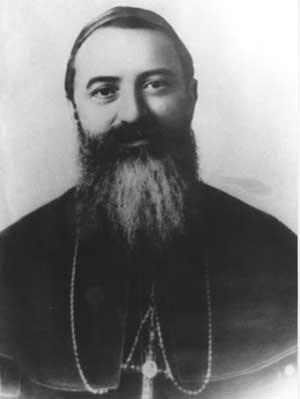
- Diocese: Hong Kong
- Installed: 12 July 1905 (as Vicar Apostolic)
- Term ended: 1924
- Predecessor: Louis Piazzoli (as Vicar Apostolic)
- Successor: Enrico Valtorta (as Vicar Apostolic)

Orders
- Ordination: 1 March 1885

Personal details
- Born: 22 December 1861 Italy
- Died: 20 February 1924 (aged 62) Hong Kong
- Buried: Crypt at Cathedral of the Immaculate Conception, Hong Kong
- Denomination: Catholic

Dominic Pozzoni (22 December 1861 – 20 February 1924) was titular Bishop of Tavia and the third Apostolic Vicar of Hong Kong. He was a member of the Milan Foreign Missions (M.F.M.).

== Life ==
Dominic Pozzoni was born in Paderno d'Adda, Italy 22 December 1861. In 1882 he entered the Lombardy Seminary for Foreign Missions in Milan. He was ordained a priest on 1 March 1885 and arrived in Hong Kong on 19 December 1885. Pozzoni was assigned to Sai Kung to assist Monsignor Luigi Piazzoli.

Pozzoni was appointed vicar apostolic on 26 May, 1905, and consecrated at the Cathedral of the Immaculate Conception (Hong Kong) in 1906.

In 1921, Bishop Pozzoni requested the Maryknoll Fathers to take over staffing St. Louis School. Some of the boys were orphans while the rest were remanded by the Hong Kong government, the government giving a small monthly grant for each student. The Maryknoll Fathers renamed the school 'St Louis Industrial School' and equipped it with a print shop to teach the boys a trade.

In 1923 Pozzoni suggested that Maryknoll Sisters staff the anticipated Kowloon Hospital. However, the government withdrew its offer in the face of objections by English residents who opposed the sisters both for their being American and Catholic.

He died in the French Hospital in Hong Kong 20 February 1924.

== Sources ==
- Bishop Dominic Pozzoni, P.I.M.E.

Catholic Church titles
Preceded by Louis Piazzoli	Vicar Apostolic of Hong Kong; 1905–1924	Succeeded by Enrico Valtorta
Diocese restored as a titular see	— TITULAR — Bishop of Tavium; 1905–1924	Succeeded by Godric Kean
