= Francis Hsu =

Chinese clergyman

His Excellency, The Most Reverend Francis Hsu Chen-Ping
- Bishop of Hong Kong
- Diocese: Hong Kong
- Installed: 30 November 1968
- Term ended: 23 May 1973
- Predecessor: Lorenzo Bianchi
- Successor: Peter Lei
- Previous posts: Auxiliary Bishop of Hong Kong (1967–1968); Titular Bishop of Horrea (1967–1969); Apostolic Administrator of Hong Kong (1968–1969)

Orders
- Ordination: 14 March 1959
- Consecration: 7 October 1967 by Lorenzo Bianchi

Personal details
- Born: 20 February 1920 Shanghai, Republic of China
- Died: 23 May 1973 (aged 53) British Hong Kong
- Buried: Crypt at Cathedral of the Immaculate Conception, Hong Kong
- Denomination: Catholic
- Residence: Hong Kong
- Education: Oxford University; St. John's University, Shanghai
- Motto: Laetus Serviam
- Coat of arms: Francis Hsu Chen-Ping's coat of arms

Styles of Francis Hsu Chen-Ping
- Reference style: His Excellency; The Most Reverend
- Spoken style: Your Excellency
- Religious style: Bishop

Ordination history of Francis Hsu
History
Priestly ordination
- Date: 14 March 1959
- Place: Rome, Italy
Episcopal consecration
- Principal consecrator: Lorenzo Bianchi (Hong Kong)
- Co-consecrators: Stanislaus Lo Kuang (Taipei); Petrus Tou Pao-zin (Hsinchu)
- Date: 7 October 1967
- Place: Cathedral of the Immaculate Conception, British Hong Kong
Episcopal succession
Bishops consecrated by Francis Hsu as principal consecrator
- Peter Lei: 8 September 1971

Francis Hsu Chen-Ping (simplified Chinese: 徐诚斌; traditional Chinese: 徐誠斌; pinyin: Xú Chéngbīn; 20 February 1920 – 23 May 1973), was a Chinese clergyman. He was the third bishop and the first ethnically-Chinese bishop of the Roman Catholic Diocese of Hong Kong.

Born into a Methodist family in Shanghai, Hsu joined the Catholic Church when he was teaching at a National Central University in Nanking between 1944 and 1947. He studied at St. John's University, Shanghai in 1936. He was awarded Master of Arts from Merton College, Oxford.

Hsu escaped to Hong Kong in 1950 after the Kuomintang left mainland China. He was later ordained a Priest in Rome on 14 March 1959. Hsu was the editor of Kung Kao Po, a Catholic newspaper in Hong Kong, from 1959 to 1965. On 1 July 1967, he was appointed Auxiliary Bishop of Hong Kong and Titular Bishop of Orrea. After the resignation of Lorenzo Bianchi in 1969, he was appointed bishop of Hong Kong.

Francis Hsu died in Hong Kong on 23 May 1973 from a heart attack.

== See also ==
- Roman Catholic Diocese of Hong Kong

Catholic Church titles
First	Auxiliary Bishop of Hong Kong; 1967–1969	Vacant Title next held by Peter Lei
First	Apostolic Administrator of Hong Kong; 1968–1969	Vacant Title next held by John Tong Hon
Preceded by Lorenzo Bianchi	Bishop of Hong Kong; 1969–1973	Succeeded by Peter Lei
Preceded by Francis Patrick Carroll	— TITULAR — Bishop of Horrea; 1967–1969	Succeeded by Alphonse U Than Aung
