= Our Lady of Mount Carmel Church (Hong Kong) =

Church building in Hong Kong

- 聖母聖衣堂
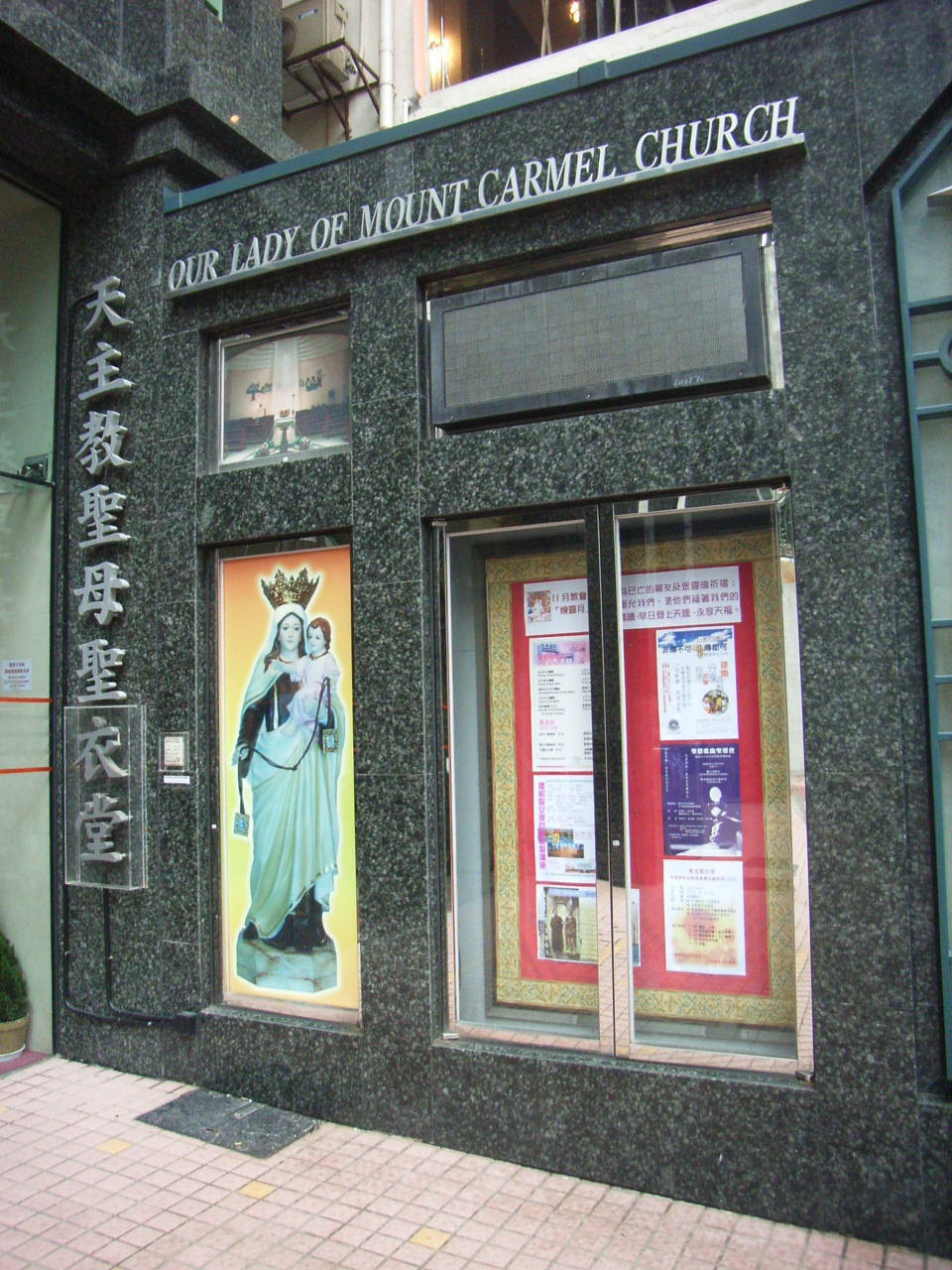
- Our Lady of Mount Carmel Church in Star Street, Hong Kong.
- Our Lady of Mount Carmel Church
- 22.27589°N 114.16851°E
- Location: 1 Star Street, Central, Hong Kong
- Website: www.olmcchurch.org.hk

History
- Former name: St. Francis Xavier Chapel
- Status: Parish Church
- Consecrated: 10 November 2001; 24 years ago

Administration
- Diocese: Hong Kong

Clergy
- Bishop: Stephen Chow
- Priest: Thomas Law Kwok Fai

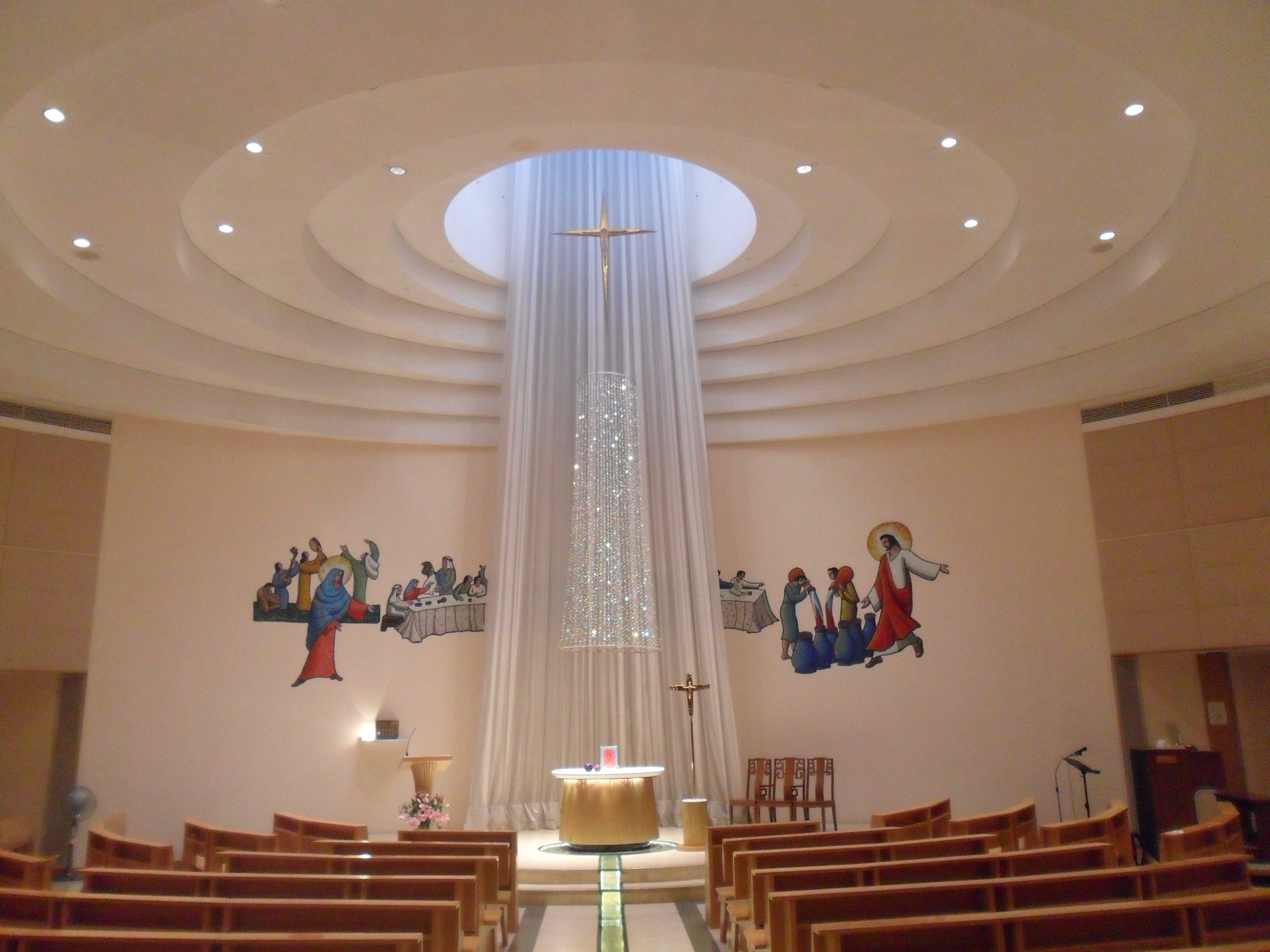
Interior of Our Lady of Mount Carmel Church.

Our Lady of Mount Carmel Church (Chinese: 聖母聖衣堂) is a Roman Catholic church in the Diocese of Hong Kong. It is located in the Wanchai district at 1 Star Street. The church is unique being located within a private multi-storey residential building, rather than a stand-alone structure. The current parish priest is Rev. Thomas Law Kwok-Fai.

== History ==
The current church situated in the historical site of St. Francis Xavier Chapel, which was the place of worship for Catholic faithful in the Wanchai area as early as 1845. There were religious communities, Catholic hospital, and homes for abandoned babies and blind women. As the number of faithful grew, the parish priest, Father James Zilioli, and the Wanchai faithful were determined to build a new church.

The preparation effort started from 1934, but due to financial difficulty, construction work could only be able to start by the end of February 1949. The new church, named as named “Holy Souls Church”, was finally opened on 19 July 1950, which was the feast day of Our Lady of Mount Carmel. In 1957, the church was renamed to "Our Lady of Mount Carmel Church”.

In the 1990s, the Diocese sold the property to secure funding for other purposes. With the dedication of the Diocese and assistance of local parishioners, agreement was reached with the developer to accommodate a church within the new premises.

The new church was officially opened and consecrated on 10 November 2001 by Cardinal John Baptist Wu Cheng-chung. The Bishop of Hong Kong

== Church design ==
The signature design of the church is a big skylight above the altar, with small sparkling pieces of crystal beads hanging down and a suspended golden cross. On the wall behind the altar, there is a mosaic depicting the scene in the Wedding at Cana by Mexican artist, Francisco Borboa. There are also flowing water running from the altar to the baptismal font at the entrance of the church.

== See also ==
- List of Catholic churches in Hong Kong
