= Timoleon Raimondi =

Timoleon Raimondi (5 May 1827 – 27 September 1894) (Chinese: 高雷門) was the Last Prefect and First Vicar Apostolic of Hong Kong (17 November 1874).

Raimondi was born in Milan, Italy. He was the younger brother of Antonio Raimondi, a prominent naturalist who worked in Peru. Timoleon was ordained as a priest on 25 May 1850. He was appointed as prefect of Hong Kong in Hong Kong on 27 December 1868.

Raimondi was also:

- Titular Bishop of Achantus and Hong Kong – 4 October 1874
- Titular Bishop of Achantus – 22 November 1874

He died in Hong Kong on 27 September 1894.

Raimondi College in the Mid-Levels, Hong Kong Island was named after him.

Catholic Church titles
Preceded by Luigi Ambrosi	Prefect Apostolic of Hong Kong; 1868–1874	Elevated to apostolic vicariate
New title	Vicar Apostolic of Hong Kong; 1874–1894	Succeeded by Louis Piazzoli
Preceded by Hugh Conway	— TITULAR — Bishop of Achantus; 1874–1894	Succeeded by John Joseph Clancy
