= Cathedral of the Immaculate Conception (Hong Kong) =

- English: Cathedral of the Immaculate Conception; Cantonese: 聖母無原罪主教座堂
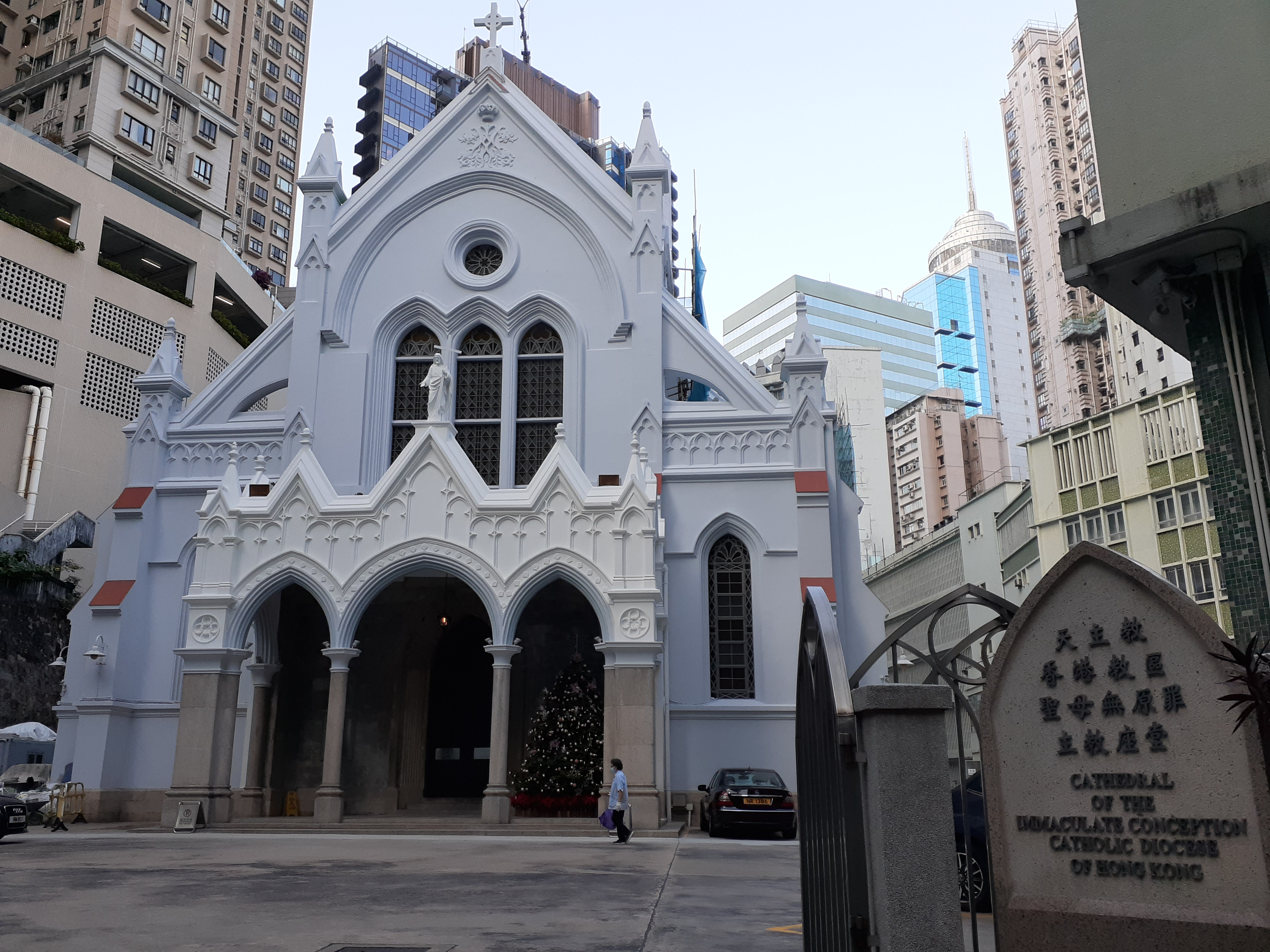
- Cathedral of the Immaculate Conception
- Cathedral of the Immaculate Conception
- 22°16′43.24″N 114°09′14.01″E
- Location: 16 Caine Road, Hong Kong
- Country: Hong Kong, China
- Denomination: Catholic

History
- Status: Cathedral
- Consecrated: 8 December 1938

Architecture
- Functional status: Active
- Heritage designation: Grade I Historic Building
- Architect: Crawley and Company
- Style: Gothic Revival
- Groundbreaking: 8 December 1883
- Completed: 7 December 1888

Administration
- Diocese: Hong Kong

Clergy
- Bishop: Stephen Chow
- Rector: Dominic Chan (parish priest)

The Cathedral of the Immaculate Conception (Chinese: 聖母無原罪主教座堂) is a late 19th-century English Gothic Revival church that serves as the cathedral of the Diocese of Hong Kong, which is effectively coterminous with the territory. It is located at 16 Caine Road, in the Mid-Levels area on the northern shore of Hong Kong Island.‌

Groundbreaking and construction of the cathedral began in 1883 after the previous cathedral, on Wellington Street at its junction with Pottinger Street, was destroyed by fire. Built from brick and stone, the new cathedral was designed by the London-based architectural firm Crawley and Company. The church opened on 7 December 1888, the day before the Feast of the Immaculate Conception, and was consecrated in 1938. Three years later, it was damaged during the Battle of Hong Kong, but remained untouched throughout the subsequent Japanese occupation which lasted until 1945. At the turn of the century, the cathedral underwent an extensive and costly programme of refurbishment, which was completed in 2002. The cathedral is listed as a Grade I historic building by the Antiquities and Monuments Office of the Hong Kong Government and the Antiquities Advisory Board.

== History ==
=== Original structure (1843–1859) ===
After the First Opium War, Hong Kong was ceded to the British in the Treaty of Nanking and the colony soon became a popular stopover for missionaries travelling onwards to China. The parish was established in 1842 by Theodore Joset, the first Prefect Apostolic of Hong Kong, and work began on a new and permanent church soon afterwards. The new church was located at the junction of Pottinger Street and Wellington Street. Construction was completed in 1843. Within the next few years, the number of Catholics in the parish grew significantly, partly due to the emigration of people from neighbouring Macau. The Portuguese colony was in gradual decline, and many people who resided there sought better opportunities in the young and prospering colony of Hong Kong.

=== Second cathedral (1859) ===
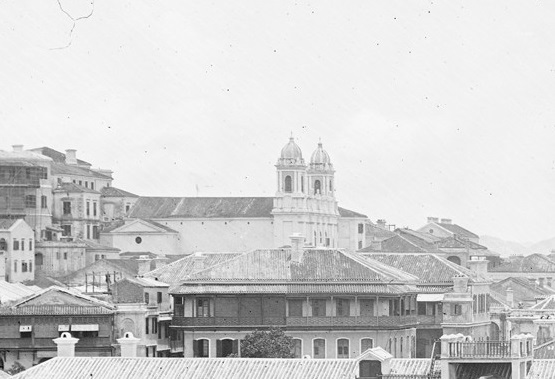
Hong Kong Catholic cathedral (second generation), circa 1870.

In 1859, just sixteen years after it was built, the church was destroyed by fire. This was not uncommon, however, as devastating fires frequently plagued the developing colony, and a new cathedral was quickly built on the same site. It featured iconic twin steeples at its façade. However, the Victoria Harbour waterfront district where the church was situated became more overcrowded with the rapid growth of Hong Kong at the time, and it became apparent that a permanent and larger cathedral was necessary. As a result, plans were made for a new church on a more elevated ground in the Mid-Levels, located close to the Hong Kong Zoological and Botanical Gardens.

=== Present-day cathedral ===
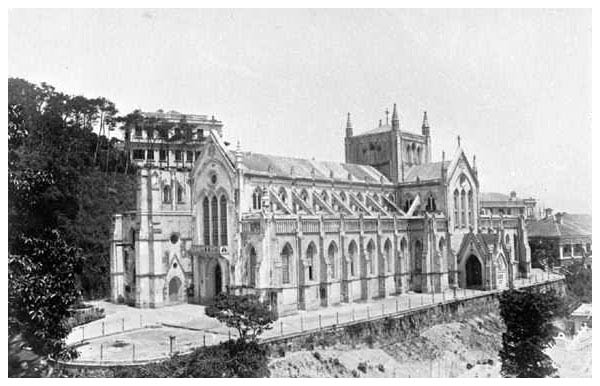
The cathedral in 1897.

A new site for the cathedral was selected above Caine Road by the Glenealy Ravine and the cornerstone of the new church was laid on 8 December 1883. Crawley and Company of London were hired to be the architects and five years later, construction was completed. The church opened on 7 December 1888, the vigil of the Feast of the Immaculate Conception, and was blessed one day later. The construction of the cathedral cost US$15,400, and since a Catholic church can only be consecrated once it has become free from debt, the cathedral did not have its rite of consecration held until 8 December 1938, one day after the fiftieth anniversary of its opening. The ceremony was officiated by the vicar apostolic of Hong Kong Enrico Valtorta, the bishop of Macau José da Costa Nunes and the bishop emeritus of Canton; three of the cathedral's altars were also consecrated.

During the Second World War, the cathedral suffered damage on its anniversary in 1941, when a Japanese shell was dropped onto it during the Battle of Hong Kong. However, it survived the war relatively unscathed due to a decree made a century before. When the mission in Hong Kong was first established in 1841, Pope Pius IX ruled that, although the colony was under British rule, the Prefecture Apostolic should remain under the administration of the Pontifical Institute for Foreign Missions (PIME), a missionary society from Italy. As a result, the Japanese treated the cathedral as being under the sovereignty of the Kingdom of Italy, with whom they were not at war. Because of this, the cathedral was spared from being ransacked and plundered by the occupying forces and its archives were preserved better than other churches throughout Hong Kong, having been left "relatively unscathed."

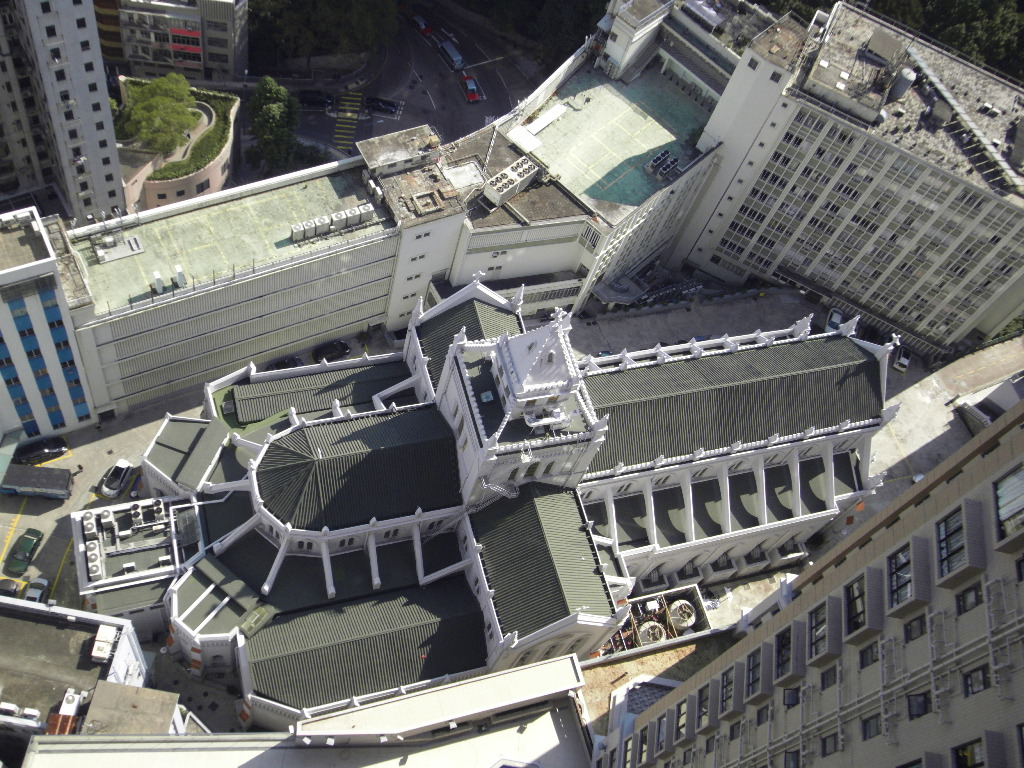
Cathedral of the Immaculate Conception

After the conclusion of the war, the cathedral underwent a series of renovations. The roof – which was previously made of timber – was replaced with a concrete one in 1952 due to damage from termites. The reordering of the sanctuary took place in 1969 after the Second Vatican Council, in which the main altar was moved to the cathedral's crossing. In 1988, air conditioning was installed and the roof underwent reparation.

Significant leaks in the roof were reported in 1997 and a massive restoration project took place. This entailed fixing the roof, repainting the walls and the niche housing the statue of the Immaculate Conception, replacing tiles, enhancing the lighting and sound system and installing new stained glass windows in the Chapel of Our Lord's Passion, which was rededicated to the Chinese Martyrs. The renovation was completed on 8 December 2002 and cost a total of US$1.1 million. The project's success in preserving the building's heritage resulted in the cathedral being given an honourable mention at the 2003 UNESCO Asia Pacific Heritage Awards for Culture Heritage Conservation and presented with the award on its anniversary in 2003.

The cathedral holds a Red Mass every other year for the Judiciary, alternating with the Anglican St. John's Cathedral in hosting the annual opening of the Assizes.

== Architecture ==
=== Interior ===
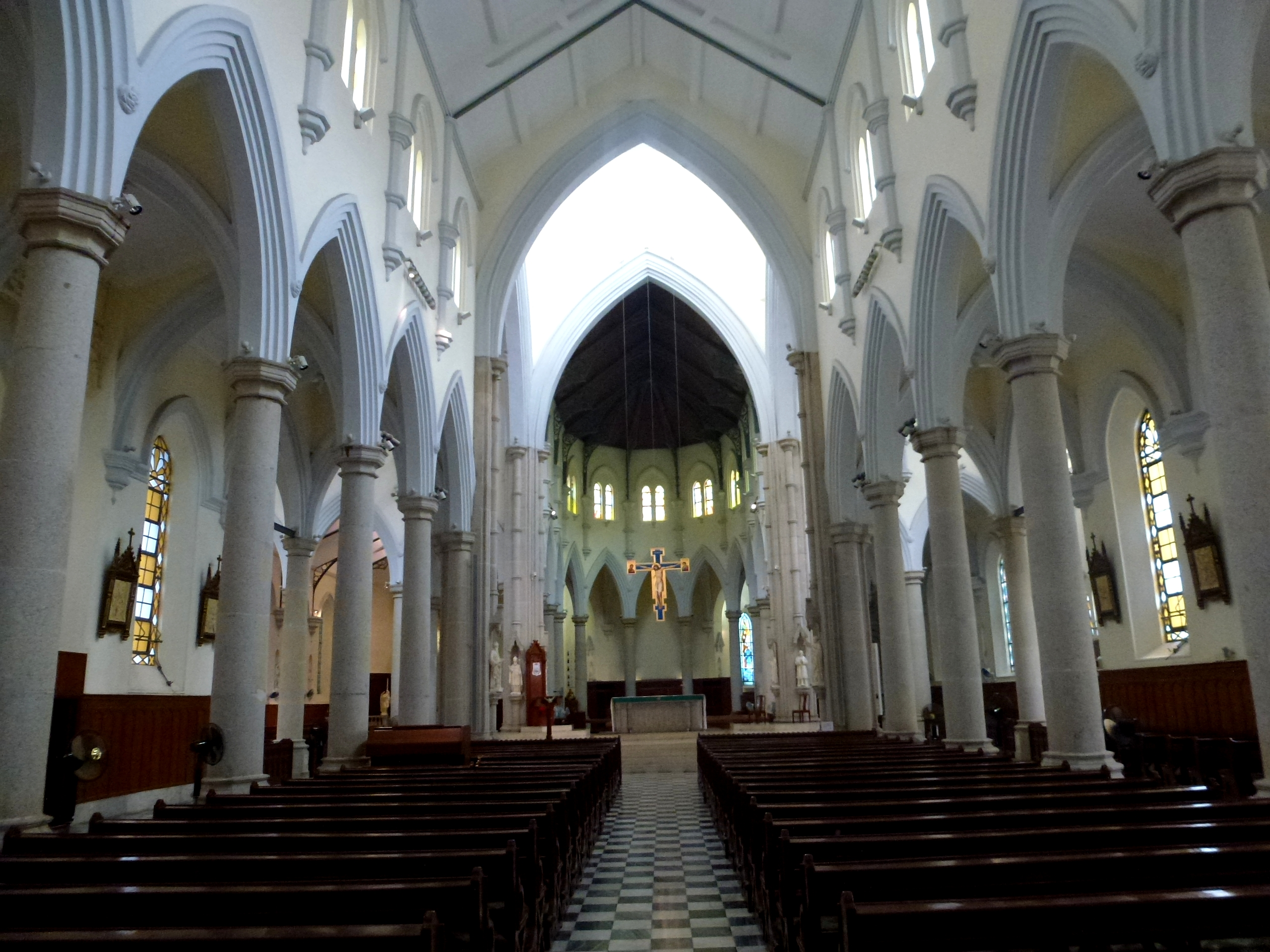
Interior of the Cathedral

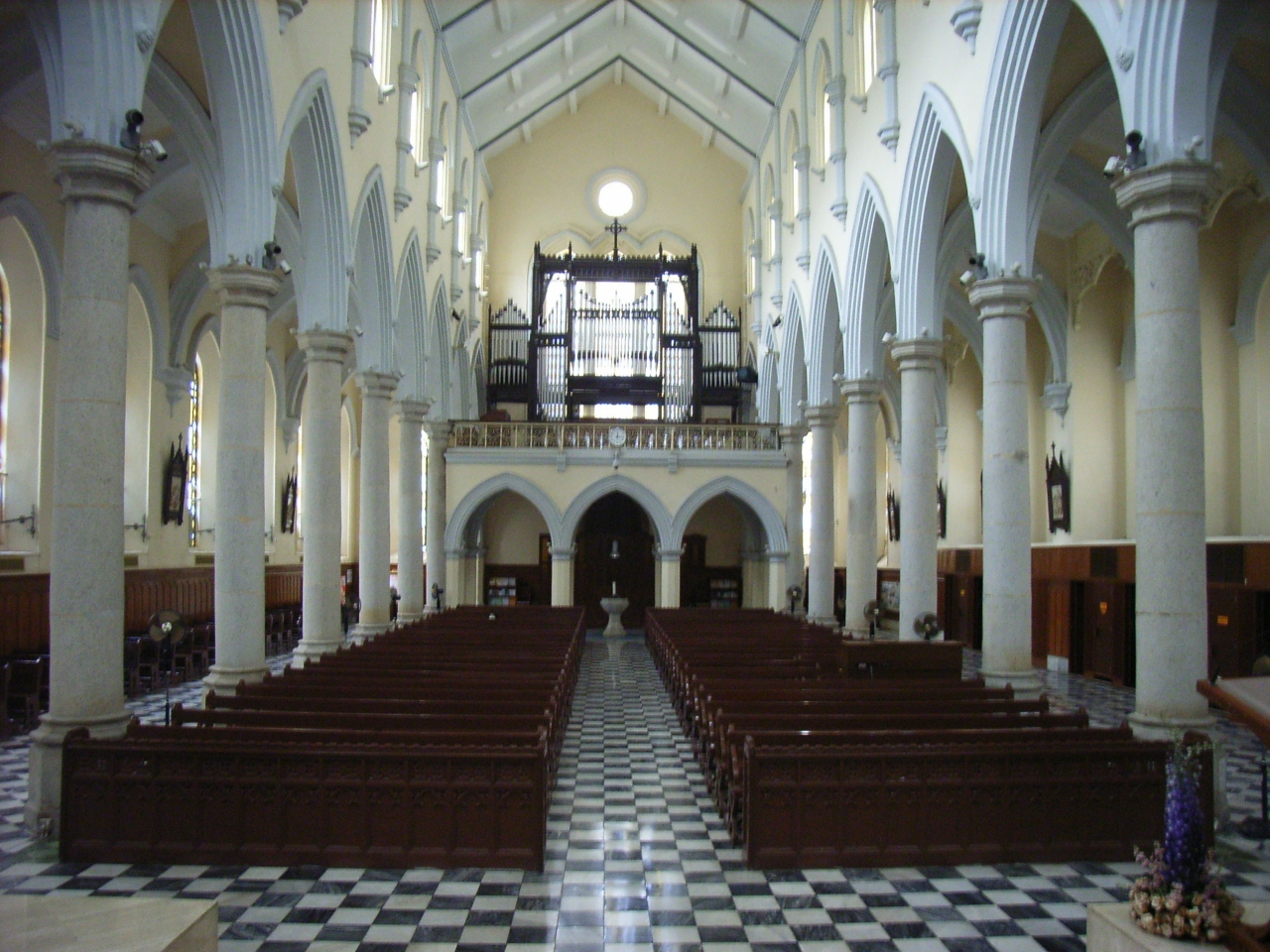
Interior of the Cathedral

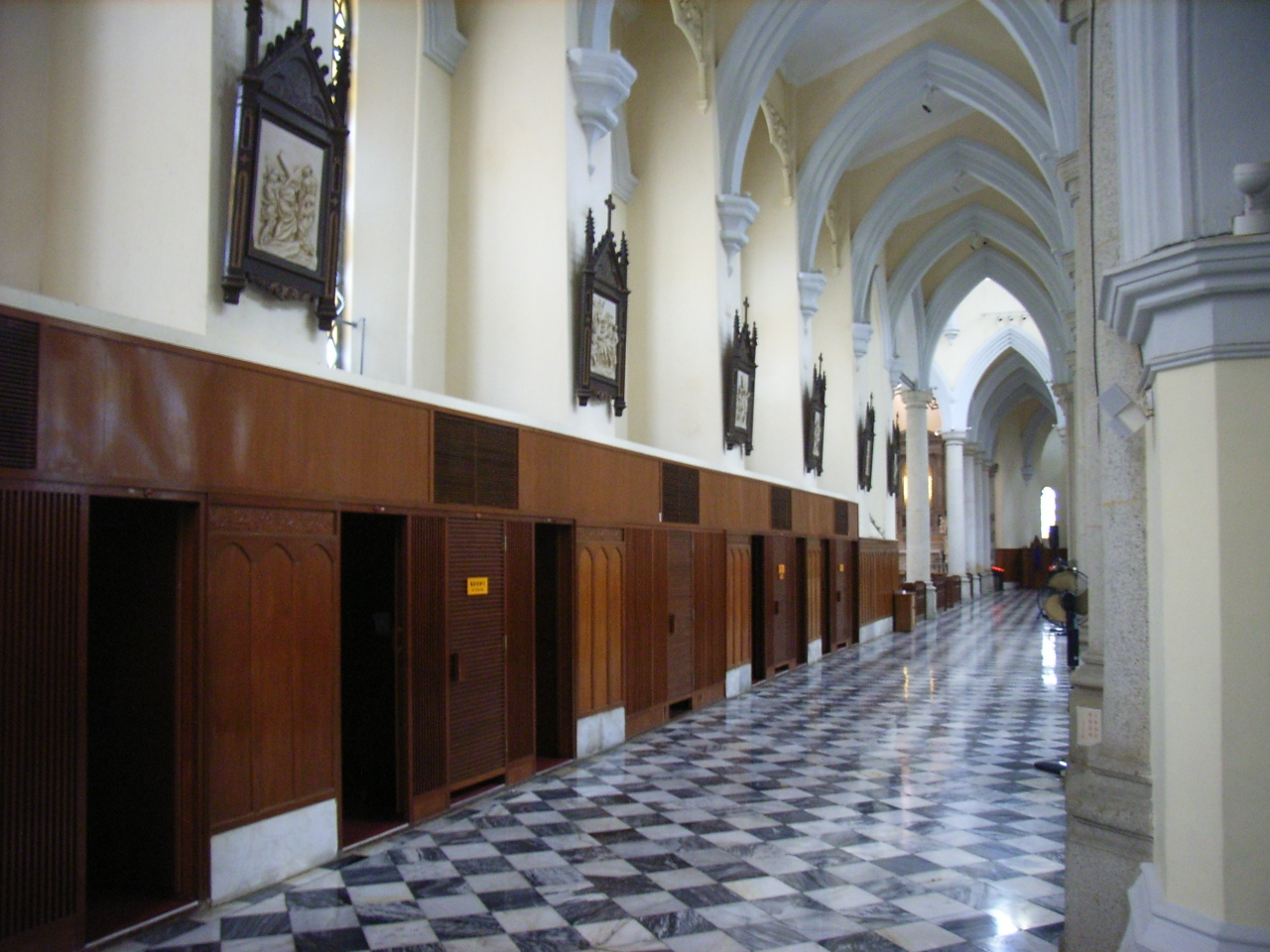
Interior of the Cathedral

The cathedral, built in an English Gothic style, is cruciform in the shape of the Latin cross. The exterior walls of the church were built from brick and stone, while its base and columns were made of granite. Its dimensions are 82 m (269 ft) long, 40 m (131 ft) wide and 23.7 m (78 ft) tall, with the tower at the centre rising to 33.7 m (111 ft).

=== Altar of St. Joseph ===
Located to the right of the main altar and sanctuary is the side altar of St. Joseph. It was given to the cathedral by King Victor Emmanuel II of Italy and the donation was facilitated by Joseph Mary Sala, an expatriate living in Hong Kong who was from the nobility of Italy. It is adorned by the royal coat of arms of the House of Savoy; this conspicuous symbol of Italy was said to have helped the cathedral identify itself as Italian rather than British, and thus, remain untouched throughout the Japanese occupation of Hong Kong, as the Kingdom of Italy and Empire of Japan were both signatories to the Tripartite Pact.

=== Altar of the Sacred Heart ===
Located to the left of the main altar is the side altar of the Sacred Heart. It was previously used as the high altar of the original cathedral at Wellington Street. It now houses the Blessed Sacrament – serving as the cathedral's main tabernacle after the removal of the high altar in 1969 – and is reserved for Eucharistic adoration.

=== Chapel of Our Lord's Passion (now Chapel of Chinese Martyrs) ===
Located to the right of the cathedral's sacristy is the side chapel of Our Lord's Passion. Given by J.J. Braga, a parishioner from Portugal, it was rededicated to the Chinese Martyrs after the 1997–2002 renovation. The chapel was chosen out of the four to commemorate the then-newly canonised saints because it was the most thematically similar, in that the martyrs gave up their lives for the faith, emulating Jesus' sacrifice to save mankind. New stained glass windows were installed depicting the saints.

=== Crypt ===
A crypt was constructed beneath the former Chapel of St. Anthony in 2009 to house the remains of former bishops of Hong Kong. This consists of two vicar apostolics, Timoleon Raimondi and Dominic Pozzoni, and five of the six deceased bishops – Enrico Valtorta, Lorenzo Bianchi, Francis Hsu, Peter Lei, and John Baptist Wu. Bianchi's remains were interred later than the others (apart from Wu) due to the fact that he was buried in Milan, Italy. Some of his remains had to be transported back to Hong Kong. Since the cathedral was a graded building, the diocese had to apply for the Buildings Department's permission. Wu's remains were interred in September 2022, twenty years after his death, after burial at St. Michael's Catholic Cemetery in Happy Valley in 2002 while the remains of Michael Yeung are buried at St. Michael's Catholic Cemetery.

The inspiration for the crypt came from the design of a traditional Chinese family house, which would contain the remains of ancestors. The bishop at the time, Joseph Cardinal Zen, felt that the crypt would be a "symbolic move to inherit the teachings of previous generations in order to inspire future ones." Because the cathedral is a Grade I historic building, prior approval had to be obtained from the Buildings Department before any construction work could be carried out.

== Treasures ==
=== Relics of the Chinese Martyrs ===
Shortly after the canonisation of the 120 Chinese Martyrs on 1 October 2000, the relics of sixteen of them were placed at the Chinese Martyrs' Chapel (formerly the Chapel of Our Lord's Passion). They are stored in a relic box – designed locally by Sister Paola Yue – that is situated at the foot of the side altar.

=== Relic of Pope John Paul II ===
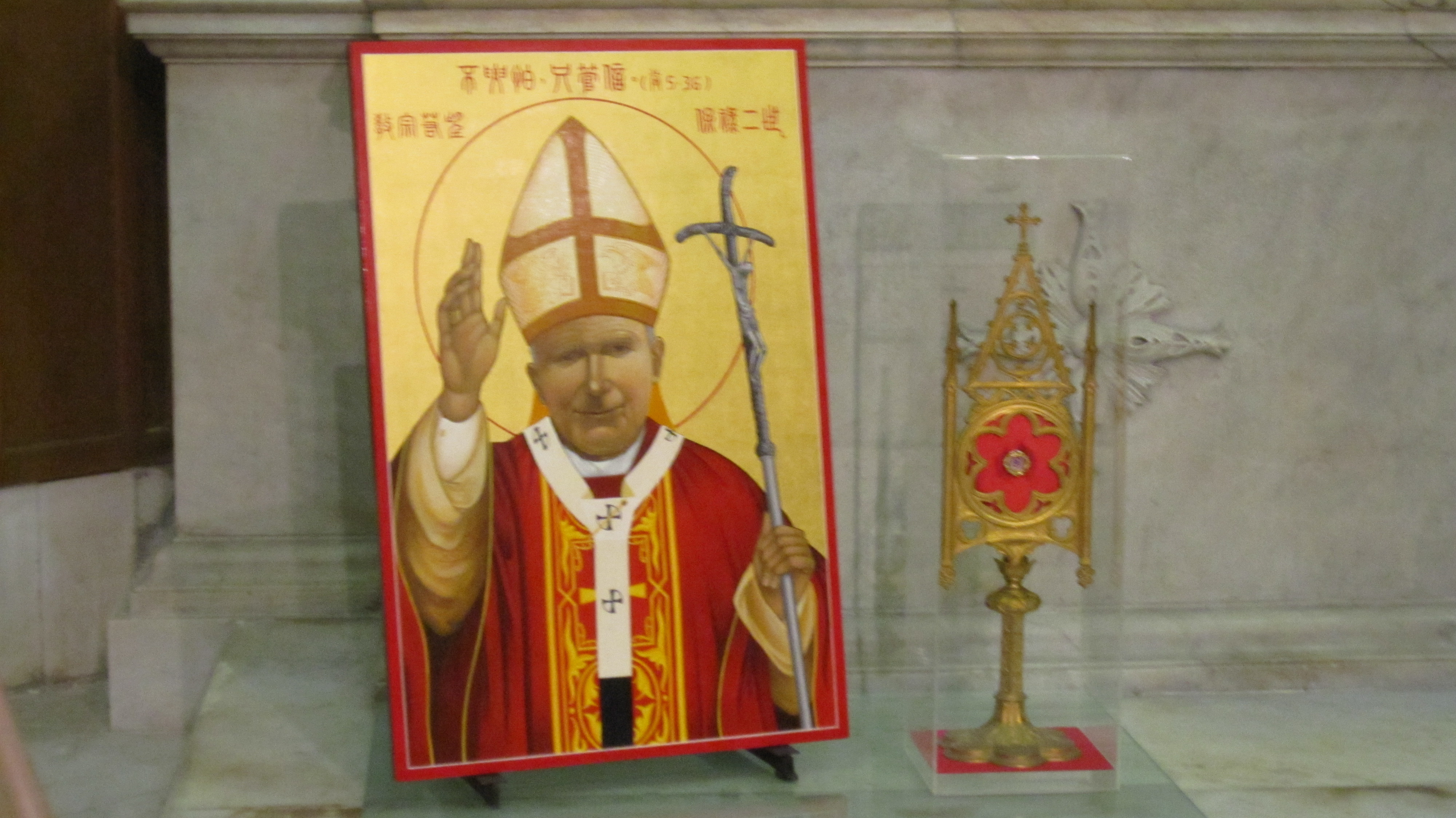
A lock of Pope John Paul II's hair is housed at the cathedral as a relic.

In November 2011, a lock of John Paul II's hair was brought to the cathedral after the Holy See granted the Diocese of Hong Kong a relic from the late pontiff. The diocese had earlier requested this, since they felt this would symbolically accomplish the Pope's longtime dream of visiting China. He had constantly stated his intent of visiting the country, but never did so due to the longstanding tensions and strained relations between China and the Holy See. Bishop John Tong expressed his hope that the relic would be able to venerated by the Mainland Chinese faithful who visited Hong Kong, the only city on Chinese soil and the first city in Asia to house a relic of John Paul II. It is currently displayed in the same chapel as the bishops' crypt.

=== Relic of Blessed Gabriele Allegra ===
The relic of Blessed Gabriele Allegra, being the bone from his right middle finger, was placed at the Chinese Martyrs' Chapel. He was known for accomplishing the first complete translation of the Catholic Bible into the Chinese languages.

== Cathedral Clergy ==
Position	Name	Diocese / Religious Order
Cathedral Rector / Parish Priest	Rev. Fr. Dominic Chan	Diocese of Hong Kong
Assistant Parish Priest	Rev. Fr. Gabriel Altamirano Ortega	Guadalupe Missionaries
Assistant Parish Priest	Rev. Fr. Francis Choi	Diocese of Hong Kong
Permanent Deacon	Rev. Deacon Simon Tam	Diocese of Hong Kong
Permanent Deacon	Rev. Deacon Victor Lee	Diocese of Hong Kong

== See also ==
- Catholic Marian church buildings
- List of 19th-century buildings and structures in Hong Kong
- List of cathedrals in Hong Kong
- List of Catholic churches in Hong Kong
- Places of worship in Hong Kong
- List of cathedrals in Asia
