= Théodore-Augustin Forcade =

French Catholic archbishop

His Excellency, The Most Reverend Théodore-Augustin Forcade MEP
- Archbishop of Aix-en-Provence and Arles and Embrun
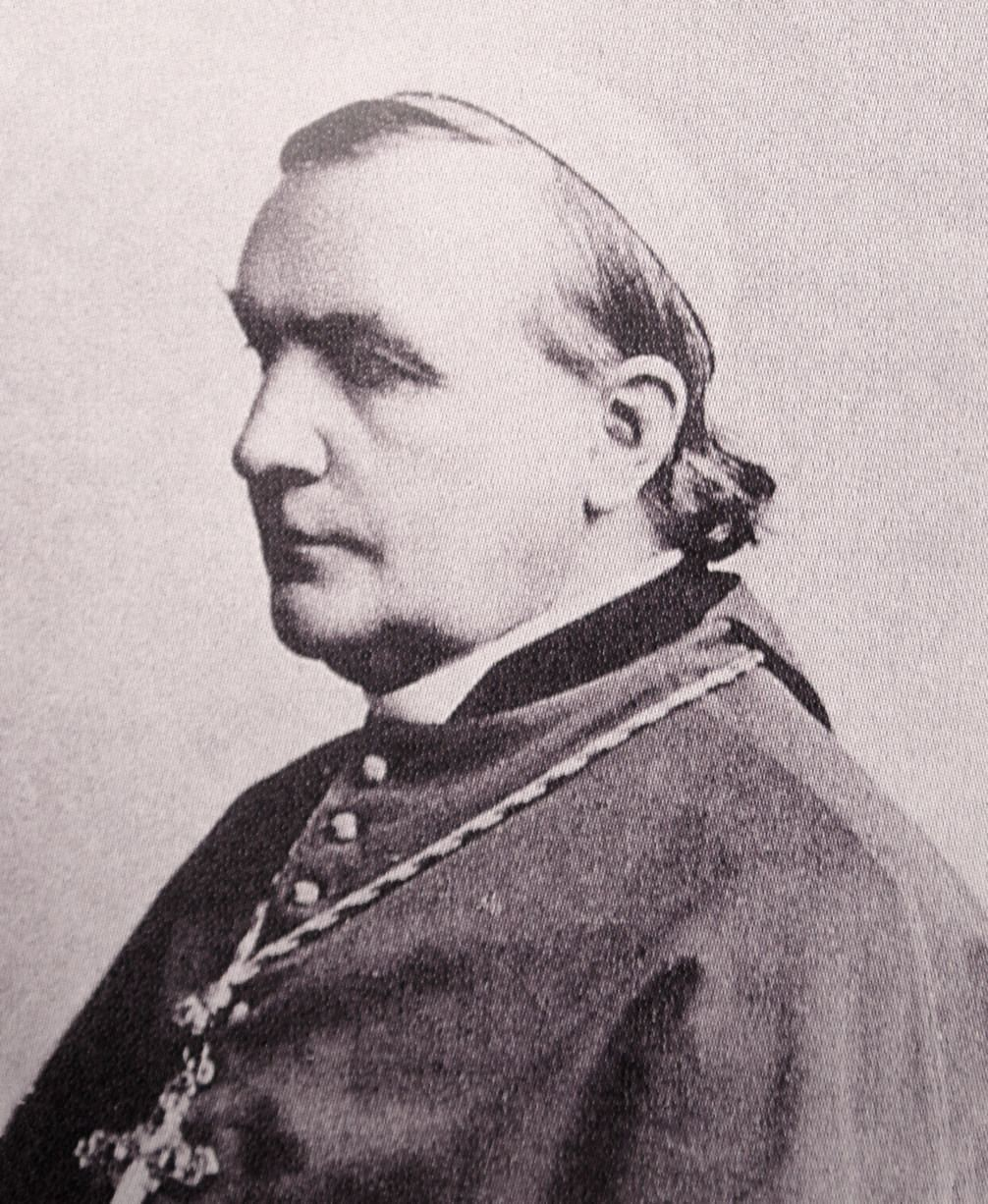
- Church: Catholic Church
- Archdiocese: Archdiocese of Aix-en-Provence and Arles and Embrun
- In office: 25 July 1873 – 12 September 1885
- Predecessor: Georges Chalandon
- Successor: Xavier Gouthe-Soulard
- Previous posts: Bishop of Nevers (1861-1873); Bishop of Guadeloupe and Basse-Terre (1853-1861); Titular Bishop of Samos (1846-1853); Vicar Apostolic of Japan (1846-1852)

Orders
- Ordination: 16 March 1839
- Consecration: 21 February 1847 by Giuseppe Maria Rizzolati

Personal details
- Born: 2 March 1816 Versailles, Seine-et-Oise, Kingdom of France
- Died: 12 September 1885 (aged 69) Aix-en-Provence, Bouches-du-Rhône, French Republic
- Motto: Fortitudo Mea Dominus
- Coat of arms

Théodore-Augustin Forcade (1816–1885) was a French Catholic prelate who served as Archbishop of Aix-en-Provence from 1873 to 1885.

== Biography ==
Théodore-Augustin Forcade was born on 2 March 1816 in Versailles, near Paris.

Forcade was ordained priest at the Paris Foreign Missions Society in 1839.

He served as the Apostolic Vicar of Japan from 1846 to 1852, as the Pro-Prefect Apostolic of Hong Kong from 1847, as the Bishop of Basse Terre from 1853 to 1860, and as the Bishop of Nevers from 1860 to 1873.

He served as the Archbishop of Aix-en-Provence from 1873 to 1885.

He died on 12 September 1885 in Aix-en-Provence.
