= Theodore Joset =

Swiss priest

Theodore Joset (Chinese: 若瑟神父; 7 October 1804 – 5 August 1842) was a Swiss priest and the first Prefect Apostolic of Hong Kong.

== Early life ==
Josef was born in Courfaivre, Switzerland in 1804. He was ordained as a diocesan priest at Fribourg in 1831.

== Career ==
After his ordination, Joset spent two years at Saignelégier. He was then appointed as the representative of the Sacred Congregation for the Propagation of the Faith in the Portuguese colony of Macau. He departed for China on 13 August 1833 and arrived 15 months later in Macau on 15 November 1834.

Josef was to assist Raphael Umpierres, the Procurator of the mission at Macau, and then succeeded the position in 1835. On 17 December 1839, he was also appointed consul general to Charles Albert, King of Sardinia.

=== Apostolic Prefecture in Hong Kong ===
The need for pastoral care in Hong Kong had come to the attention of Josef during the First Opium War. The British troops stationing in Hong Kong, many of them were Irish and Catholic, had no army chaplains, and only had Macau to look to for religious support. Given the alarming rate of illness and death among British soldiers there, Josef realized that the services of Catholic priests had become an urgent requirement in Hong Kong.

Fr. Joset then wrote to Rome from Macau and urged the Church to recognize Hong Kong's situation and the need to begin a mission there. Consequently, Pope Gregory XVI decreed to create an Apostolic Prefecture that would include "Hong Kong with the surrounding six leagues," and would be independent of the Macau Diocese, on 22 April 1841. This was only 3 months after the British first hoisted their flag in Hong Kong and well before the signing of Treaty of Nanking, which would formally cede Hong Kong to Britain, in August 1842. Joset was appointed as Hong Kong's first Prefect Apostolic.

Joset's action and the Church's response enraged the Portuguese authorities in Macau, who claimed jurisdiction on Hong Kong. He, along with other priests and Chinese seminarians, were banished from Macau by the Macau authorities.

=== Work in Hong Kong ===
Joset and the other banished priests and seminarians arrived in Hong Kong on 3 March 1842. The prime concern of the newly established Apostolic Prefecture was to serve the religious needs of Irish soldiers. Joset not only diligently carried on his duties as procurator, but also started at once to build the Mission House, arrange for a site and building materials for the church, and level sites for the cemetery, the seminary, and other institutions. He oversaw the laying of foundation stone of the first Catholic church in Hong Kong dedicated to the Immaculate Conception in Wellington Street on 7 June 1842.

== Death and burial ==
After arriving in Hong Kong, Joset died of a fever on 5 August 1842, at the age of 38. After his death, Joset was remembered as the founder of Hong Kong's Catholic Church.

He was laid to rest behind the main altar of the Catholic Cathedral of the Immaculate Conception, beneath a marble slab on which said: “ Here awaiting the Resurrection are the mortal remains of Theodore Joset, Swiss priest of the Propaganda Fide, Apostolic Representative, Procurator of China, First Apostolic Prefect of Hong Kong and of all the Missions. He lived thirty-eight years and died on the 5th of August 1842.”

== See also ==
- Catholic Church in Hong Kong
- Roman Catholic Diocese of Hong Kong
