= Lorenzo Bianchi =

20th-century Italian Catholic bishop

His Excellency, The Most Reverend Lorenzo Bianchi
- Bishop Emeritus of Hong Kong
- Diocese: Hong Kong
- Installed: 26 October 1952
- Term ended: 30 November 1968
- Predecessor: Enrico Valtorta
- Successor: Francis Hsu
- Previous posts: Coadjutor Bishop of Hong Kong (1949–1951); Titular Bishop of Choma (1949–1951); Titular Bishop of Sorres (1968–1976)

Orders
- Ordination: 23 September 1922
- Consecration: 9 October 1949 by Enrico Valtorta

Personal details
- Born: 1 April 1899 Corteno, Italy
- Died: 13 February 1983 (aged 83) Brescia, Italy
- Denomination: Catholic
- Motto: Respice Stellam
- Coat of arms

Styles of Lorenzo Bianchi
- Reference style: His Excellency; The Right Reverend
- Spoken style: Your Excellency
- Religious style: Monsignor
- Posthumous style: none

Lorenzo Bianchi (Chinese: 白英奇; 1 April 1899 – 13 February 1983) was born in Italy, at Corteno, near Brescia. Mons. Lorenzo Bianchi was ordained a Priest of the Pontifical Institute for Foreign Missions (PIME) on 23 September 1922 and arrived in Hong Kong on 13 September 1923.

== Career ==
In 1924, Bianchi worked in Sai Kung, New Territories; from 1925 to 1929 in Swa Bue, Hoi Fung District; from 1930 to 1941 (and for a 2nd time from 1948 to 1949) he was the director of Hoi Fung District. He was appointed as coadjutor bishop of Hong Kong on 21 April 1949 and was consecrated titular bishop of Choma on 9 October 1949 and returned to Hoi Fung. He succeeded his predecessor on 3 September 1951 and, after he was released from China, was installed on 26 October 1952. He resigned on 30 November 1968 and was appointed the titular bishop of Sorres until 10 October 1976. He returned to Italy on 19 April 1969 and died there on 13 February 1983.

The Caritas Bianchi College of Careers (CBCC) in Hong Kong is named after Bianchi.

== See also ==
- Catholic Diocese of Hong Kong

Catholic Church titles
First	Coadjutor Bishop of Hong Kong; 1949–1951	Vacant Title next held by Joseph Zen
Preceded by Enrico Valtorta	Bishop of Hong Kong; 1951–1968	Succeeded by Francis Hsu
First	— TITULAR — Bishop of Choma; 1949–1951	Succeeded by Luigi Carlo Borromeo
First	— TITULAR — Bishop of Sorres; 1968–1976	Succeeded by Franz Josef Kuhnle
