= Diocese of Hong Kong =

Diocese of the Catholic Church

Coordinates: 22.2787°N 114.1538°E

Diocese of Hong Kong Dioecesis Sciiamchiamensis 天主教香港教區
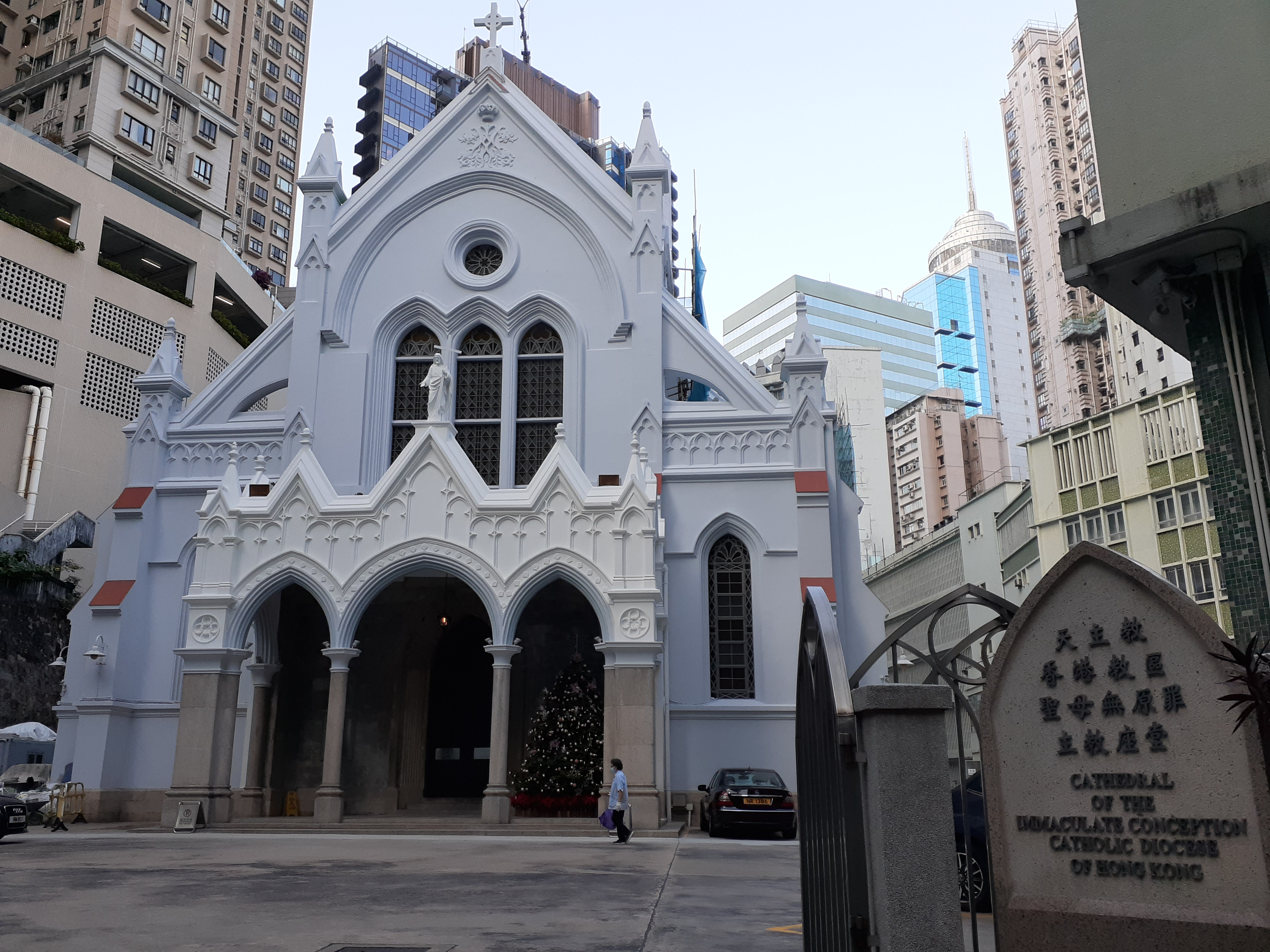
- Cathedral of Hong Kong

Location
- Territory: Hong Kong
- Ecclesiastical province: Guangzhou, China (de jure); Exempt (de facto)

Statistics
- Area: 1,104 km^{2} (426 sq mi) (de facto)
- Population: Total; Catholics: (as of 2015); 7,374,900 (de facto); 581,000 (7.9%)

Information
- Denomination: Catholic
- Sui iuris church: Latin Church
- Rite: Roman Rite
- Cathedral: Cathedral of the Immaculate Conception

Current leadership
- Pope: Leo XIV
- Bishop: Stephen Chow Sau-yan
- Auxiliary Bishops: Joseph Ha
- Vicar General: Peter Choy Wai-man; Paul Kam Po-wai; Joseph Chan Wing-chiu
- Bishops emeritus: Joseph Zen Ze-kiun; John Tong Hon

Diocese of Hong Kong

Chinese name
- Traditional Chinese: 天主教香港教區
- Simplified Chinese: 天主教香港教区
Transcriptions
Standard Mandarin
- Hanyu Pinyin: Tiānzhǔjiào Xiānggǎng jiàoqū
- Yale Romanization: Tyānzhǔjyào Syānggǎng jyàochyū
Yue: Cantonese
- Yale Romanization: Tínjyǔgáau Heūnggóng Gāauàu
- Jyutping: tin^{1} zyu^{2} gaau^{1} hoeng^{1} gong^{2} sing^{3} gaau^{1} au^{1}

Latin name
- Latin: Dioecesis Sciiamchiamensis

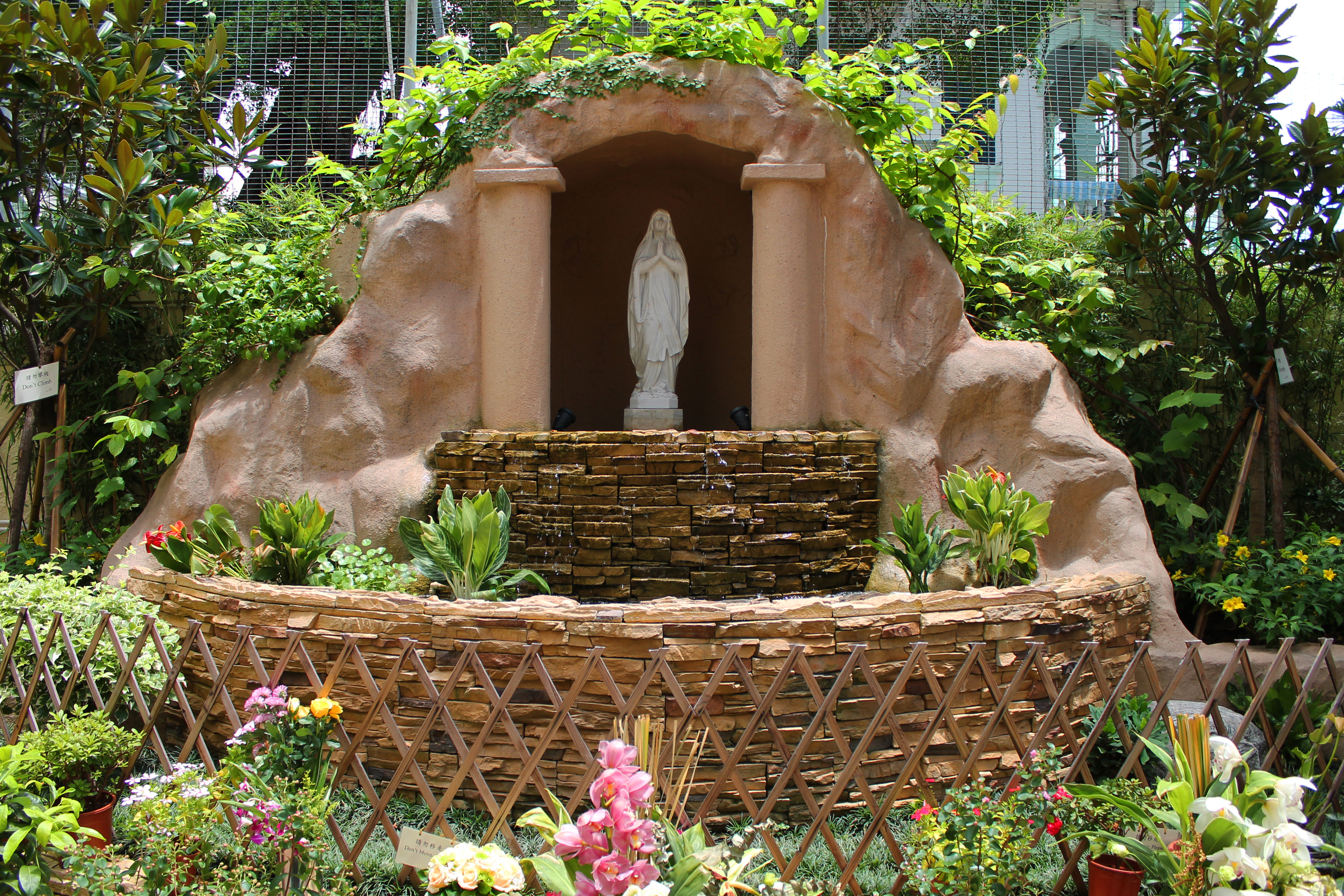
Grotto at Catholic Centre in the Kowloon area of Hong Kong

The Diocese of Hong Kong (Chinese: 天主教香港教區; Latin: Dioecesis Sciiamchiamensis) is a Latin Church diocese of the Catholic Church. The diocese takes its name from the see city, the metropolitan area where the bishop resides.

The Diocese of Hong Kong is a de jure suffragan diocese of the Archdiocese of Guangzhou (Canton). However, in practice it is an immediate subject of the Holy See. Also in theory, not only Hong Kong, but also a small part of Guangdong province belongs to the diocese. In practice, however, the diocese only comprises the Hong Kong Special Administrative Region.

There were about 395,000 local Catholics as of August 2022, and 169,000 Filipino Catholics in Hong Kong. Most Hong Kong Catholics are Chinese. However, there are also various national groups of Filipino, Korean, Japanese, Indian, French and German Catholics. They are served by 279 priests, 36 deacons, 62 brothers and 419 sisters. There are 52 parishes, comprising 39 churches, 28 chapels and 24 halls for religious purposes including the celebration of the liturgy. As of 2022, the diocese has 249 Catholic schools and kindergartens, having a total of over 136,000 pupils.

The Bishop emeritus of Hong Kong is Joseph Cardinal Zen Ze-kiun, SDB (Chinese: 陳日君). He is regarded by some to be politically 'controversial' due to his 'anti-Beijing' views and his strong ties with the pro-democracy camp. However, Zen has constantly personally maintained that he is very patriotic to his country, and that he has been upset that he has been denied the right to return to mainland China.

The current Bishop of Hong Kong is Stephen Chow, SJ (Chinese: 周守仁), who was appointed by Pope Francis in 2021. He took over from Cardinal John Tong Hon, who served as Apostolic Administrator following the death of Michael Yeung Ming-cheung in 2019.

The cathedral of the Diocese of Hong Kong is the Cathedral of the Immaculate Conception, located on Caine Road, Mid Levels.

== History ==
The organisation of what would become the Diocese of Hong Kong began immediately after the establishment of Hong Kong as a British colony.

=== Prefecture apostolic ===
In 1841 Pope Gregory XVI created a prefecture apostolic comprising "Hong Kong with the surrounding six leagues" independent from the Diocese of Macau, but under the authority of the bishop of Macau. Given the alarming rate of illness and death among British soldiers, the initial need for the establishment of the prefecture was the spiritual care of the British (Irish Catholic) soldiers stationed in the newly established colony.

Theodore Joset, a Swiss diocesan priest, and former procurator of the mission at Macau, became the first prefect apostolic. In 1842, at the junction of Pottinger Street and Wellington Street, he laid the foundation stone for the first Catholic church in Hong Kong. It was dedicated to the Immaculate Conception.

Following Joset's death in 1842, Anthony Feliciani became Prefect Apostolic of Hong Kong. The St. Francis Xavier Chapel, for Catholic faithful in the Wan Chai area was founded in 1845. Feliciani coordinated the mission work in China, and made substantial purchases of land in the Starstreet Precinct, the earliest burial ground assigned by the Hong Kong Government for the non-Chinese population.

The prefecture functioned much as a mission, but was intended from its inception to become a diocese. In the first ten years, the missionaries built churches, schools, a seminary, and institutions for the sick, elderly, and orphans. In response to the request of Prefect Apostolic Théodore-Augustin Forcade, four Sisters of Saint Paul of Chartres arrived in Hong Kong on 12 September 1848. The Sisters first task was to establish a home for unwanted babies, mostly girls, abandoned.

In 1858, the first missionaries, members of the Seminary of Foreign Missions of Milan (now PIME) arrived; they were designated to take over the administration of the mission in time. They set about enlarging the cathedral, which, however, burnt down on 18 October 1859. It was rebuilt and blessed on 18 March 1860.

By 1860, the physical territory had spread well beyond the initial six leagues surrounding Hong Kong to include the San On District (新安縣), the Kowloon Peninsula, Sai Kung Peninsula, and Nam Tau.

=== Vicariate apostolic ===
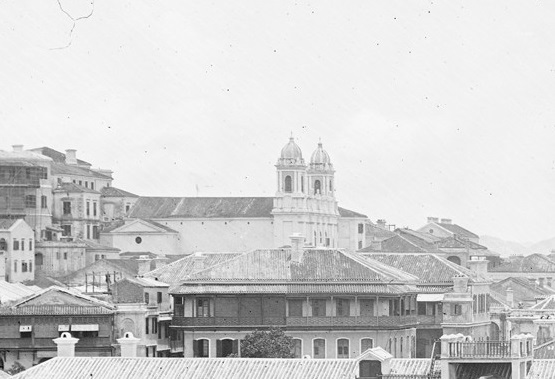
Hong Kong Catholic cathedral, circa 1870.

In 1874 the Hong Kong Prefecture was raised to a vicariate apostolic and entrusted to the Seminary of Foreign Missions of Milan. While the prefecture had been run by missionary priests, a vicariate was the intermediary step before becoming a diocese, and required a bishop to run it. Since the territory was not yet a diocese, the bishops were called "titular bishop" of another place (where they had no ecclesiastical authority). The bishops were under the direct authority of the pope, exercising their power in his name, rather than being vested with the office belonging to a diocese.

The first vicar apostolic was Bishop Giovanni Timoleon Raimondi (consecrated 22 November 1874), who died at Mission House, Glenealy, Hong Kong, on 27 September 1894. In 1880, the vicariate hosted the first synod of the fifth ecclesiastical region of the Catholic Church in China; (it hosted a second synod in 1891, and a third in 1909). In 1883, the foundation stone of a new cathedral was laid. This is the present Immaculate Conception Cathedral. It was built in 1888 and consecrated in 1938.

Raimondi was succeeded by Bishops Louis Piazzoli (born 1849) and Dominic Pozzoni (born 1851) elected 26 May 1905. The vicariate continued to grow. In 1875, the Brothers of the Christian Schools founded St Joseph's College, Hong Kong’s oldest Catholic boys’ school. The Sisters of Canossa also established a presence in Hong Kong.

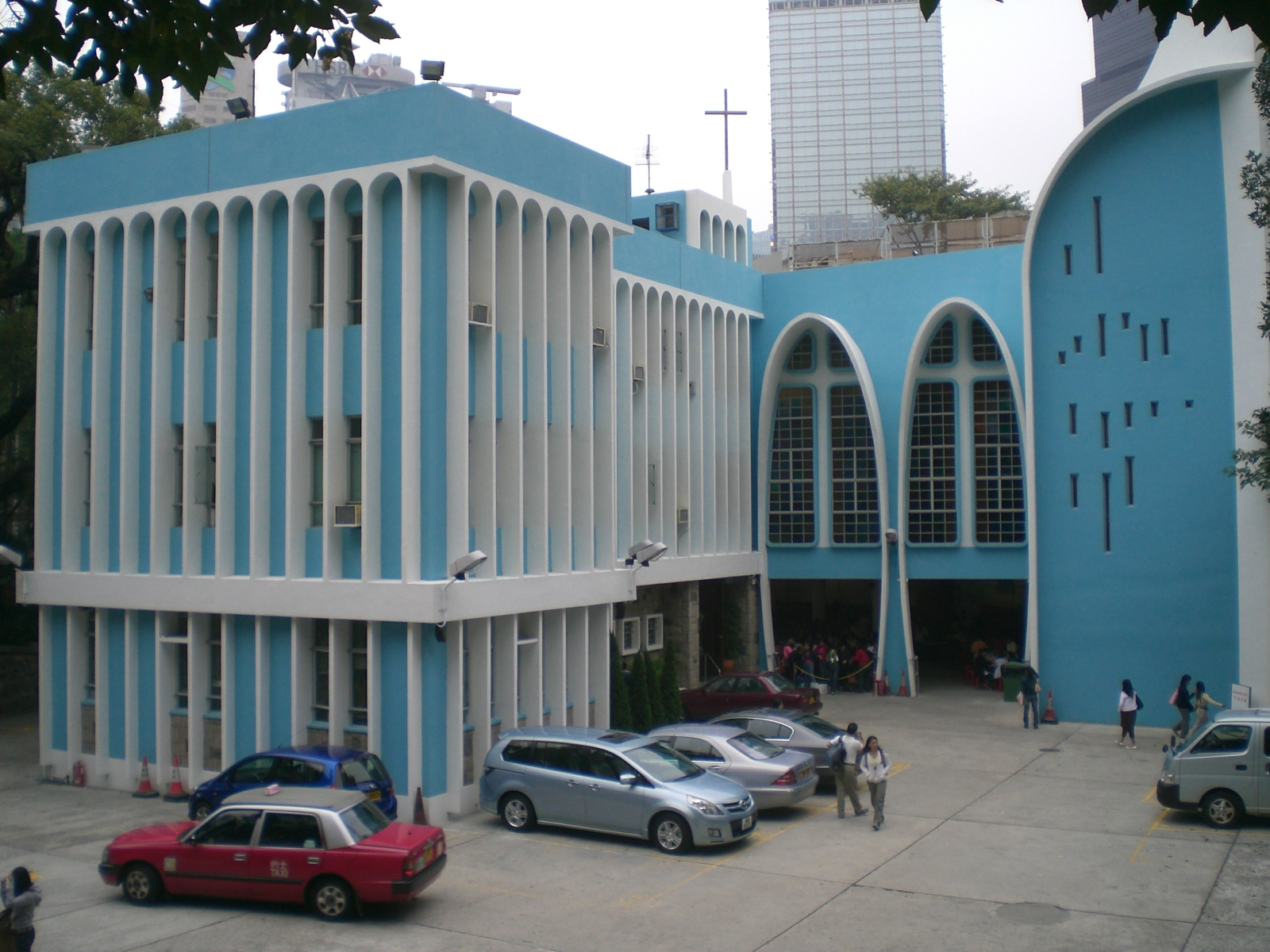
St Joseph's Church, Garden Road

Besides Hong Kong Island, the vicariate included Kowloon (which became part of the colony in 1860), Lantau Island (part of the colony since 1898) and the three continental districts of San-on (新安), Kwei Hsin (歸善), and Hoi Fung (Haï-fung) (海豐).

Churches with resident priests were the cathedral (Glenealy), St. Joseph's [commons] (Garden Road), St. Francis (Wan Chai), Church of the Sacred Heart (West Point), Church of St. Anthony‌ (West Point). The Société des Missions Etrangères de Paris had a procurator, a sanitorium (Béthanie in Pok Fu Lam) and a printing office (Nazareth) at Hong Kong.

In 1875 the Société des Missions Etrangères de Paris established in Pok Fu Lam, Béthanie a sanitorium to serve as a place for priests and missionaries from all over Asia to recover from tropical diseases before returning to their missions. With the 1894, bubonic plague outbreak, much of the population left Hong Kong. John Douglas Lapraik sold the family estate at Pok Fu Lam, Douglas Castle, to the French Mission. The building soon turned into a monastery and was renamed, Nazareth. The building went through a major renovation which included a printing house that operated one of the busiest bible printing and translation facilities of the early 20th century in Asia.

More missionaries arrived from many orders throughout the 1920s and 1930s, building more churches, schools, and hospitals. In 1935, the Dominicans established St. Albert's Priory (aka. St. Albert the Great's Priory), a House of Studies for the whole Far East, at the foot of Mount Nicholson, a place that came to be known as Rosary Hill. The priory closed and the students moved to the Philippines in 1959, and the premises have since been occupied by Rosaryhill School, with part of the site becoming Villa Monte Rosa.

During World War II, the Japanese occupation stopped almost all activities. Missionaries evacuated, and were variously interned, released, and expelled. After the war, reconstruction began immediately.

=== Diocese ===
On 11 April 1946 Pope Pius XII established the episcopal hierarchy in China, raising all the apostolic vicariates to dioceses, Hong Kong among them. Since then, the Hong Kong Diocese is directly responsible to the pope. Enrico Valtorta became the first bishop of Hong Kong.

In 1949 refugees fleeing the Chinese communist regime began to pour into Hong Kong, including many Catholics and clergymen from all over China; despite nominal diocesan jurisdiction within China proper, diocesan activities were effectively restricted to the boundaries of the Colony. In 1952, the diocese opened seven new chapels for refugees.

In 1969 Bishop Francis Hsu became, after the resignation of Lorenzo Bianchi, the first ethnically Chinese bishop of Hong Kong.

On 29 May 1988 John Baptist Wu, the fifth bishop, was named a member of the College of Cardinals by Pope John Paul II. He was the first cardinal from the Hong Kong diocese.

On 18 August 1991, an Open Forum on "Elections 1991", jointly organised by the Council of Priests, the Justice and Peace Commission, the Central Council of Catholic Laity and the Catholic Institute for Religion and Society, was held in the nine constituencies of Hong Kong, Kowloon and the New Territories in order to encourage the faithful to take an active part in the direct elections to the Legislative Council on 15 September. Church organisations also made a similar appeal to the faithful and ordinary citizens through publications, questionnaires and advertisements in newspapers.

On 15 April 1993 the diocese was re-divided into nine deaneries. The Council of Priests was reorganised with all the deans included as ex officio members.

After the death of Cardinal Wu on 23 September 2002, his coadjutor Joseph Zen Ze-kiun became the 6th bishop of Hong Kong.

On 8 July 2004 the Legislative Council passed the Education (Amendment) Bill 2002. Under the amended ordinance, which would be effective on 1 January 2005, every aided school would be required before 2010 to form an incorporated management committee (IMC) whose members should include elected representatives of teachers, parents of students and alumni, as well as other independent persons, with a view to promoting a school-based management. It was the concern of the Church that, as a sponsoring body, she would no longer be empowered in the future to supervise the schools under her sponsorship, nor be able to achieve her goals and objectives in Catholic education. On 5 June 2005, Zen announced that, if the Legislative Council passed the donation to support schools to create incorporated management committees on 8 July 2005, he would appeal against the decision to the court. After the Government decided to give up some of its main objectives and the diocese subsequently decided to support the motion.

On 22 February 2006, Pope Benedict XVI announced that Bishop Joseph Zen would be raised to the College of Cardinals. He was made a cardinal at a consistory held on 24 March. Zen was an outspoken supporter of democracy and a critic of the People's Republic of China. His views on government policies were often at odds with those of Hong Kong's former Chief Executive Donald Tsang Yam-kuen, who is also a Catholic.

On 15 April 2009. Pope Benedict XVI appointed coadjutor Bishop John Tong Hon as the 7th bishop of the Diocese of Hong Kong after Zen's resignation. Tong was named a member of the College of Cardinals on 19 February 2012. On 1 August 2017, Pope Francis accepted Tong's resignation, which allowed coadjutor Bishop Michael Yeung Ming Cheung to succeed him as the 8th bishop of the Diocese of Hong Kong. Due to Yeung's unexpected death on 3 January 2019, the de facto practice after the handover of having a coadjutor bishop succeed an outgoing bishop could not be followed. His death was shortly followed by the Anti-Extradition Law Amendment Bill Movement, which sharply divided the people of Hong Kong, including Catholics. These circumstances made it difficult to appoint a bishop that could pastorally navigate the social climate of the time, and it was not until May 2021 that Pope Francis was finally able to appoint Jesuit priest Stephen Chow as the 9th bishop of Hong Kong.

== Politics ==
Catholics in Hong Kong tend to support the pro-democracy camp. Despite this there are also many Catholics that support the pro-Beijing camp. Notably, former Chief Executive of Hong Kong Donald Tsang, Carrie Lam and current Chief Executive of Hong Kong John Lee are Catholics.

In July 2022, the Vatican's unofficial representative in Hong Kong, monsignor Javier Herrera-Corona, warned that religious freedom had ended in Hong Kong due to pressure from mainland Chinese authorities, with one person summarizing the monsignor's message as "Hong Kong is not the great Catholic beachhead it was."

In May 2023, the United States government released the 2022 Report on International Religious Freedom, which stated religious leaders reported that they were self-censoring politically sensitive content, and not appointing clergy members who were critical of the Hong Kong government.

In May 2023, the diocese announced that it would not hold any commemorations for the Tiananmen Square massacre, an annual tradition in Hong Kong since 1989 that was last celebrated in 2021.

== Leadership ==
=== Ordinaries ===
Below is a list of individuals who have led the Diocese of Hong Kong and its antecedent jurisdictions since its founding.

==== Apostolic Prefects ====
- Theodore Joset (22 April 1841 – 5 August 1842)
- Antonio Feliciani (11 December 1842 – 10 May 1847) as Prefect Apostolic ad interim
- Théodore Augustin Forcade (10 May 1847 – 12 September 1885) as Pro-Prefect Apostolic
- Antonio Feliciani (24 August 1850 – 20 Jun 1855) as Prefect Apostolic ad interim
- Aloysius Ambrosi (20 June 1855 – 10 March 1867) – formerly Luigi Ambrosi
- Timoleon Raimondi (17 November 1867 – 27 December 1868) as Pro-Prefect Apostolic
- Timoleon Raimondi (27 December 1868 – 4 October 1874)

==== Apostolic Vicars ====
- Timoleon Raimondi (4 October 1874 – 27 September 1894)
- Louis Piazzoli (11 January 1895 – 26 December 1904)
- Dominic Pozzoni (12 July 1905 – 20 February 1924)
- Giovanni M. Spada (20 February 1924 – 8 March 1926) as Vicar Capitular
- Enrico Valtorta (8 March 1926 – 31 October 1948)

==== Bishops ====
- Enrico Valtorta (31 October 1948 – 3 September 1951)
- Lorenzo Bianchi (3 September 1951 – 30 November 1968)
- Francis Hsu (29 May 1969 – 23 May 1973)
- Peter Lei (21 December 1973 – 23 July 1974)
- Cardinal John Baptist Wu (25 July 1975 – 23 September 2002)
- Cardinal Joseph Zen (23 September 2002 – 15 April 2009)
- Cardinal John Tong (15 April 2009 – 1 August 2017)
- Michael Yeung (1 August 2017 – 3 January 2019)
- Cardinal Stephen Chow (4 December 2021 – present)

=== Apostolic administrators ===
- Francis Hsu (30 November 1968 – 29 May 1969)
- Cardinal John Tong (5 January 2019 – 4 December 2021)

=== Coadjutor bishops ===
Under the Code of Canon law, the coadjutor bishop has the right of succession (cum jure successionis) upon the death, retirement or resignation of the diocesan bishop he is assisting. All coadjutor bishops eventually succeeded to become head of the Diocese of Hong Kong.

- Lorenzo Bianchi (21 April 1949 – 3 September 1951)
- Joseph Zen (13 September 1996 – 23 September 2002)
- John Tong Hon (30 January 2008 – 15 April 2009)
- Michael Yeung (13 November 2016 – 1 August 2017)

=== Auxiliary bishops ===
Unlike coadjutors, auxiliary bishops do not have the right of succession, per canon 975, §1 of the 1983 Code of Canon Law. Hsu, Lei, Tong, and Yeung went on to become Bishop of Hong Kong.

- Francis Hsu (1 July 1967 – 30 November 1968)
- Peter Lei (3 July 1971 – 8 September 1971)
- John Tong (13 September 1996 – 30 January 2008)
- Michael Yeung (11 July 2014 – 13 November 2016)
- Stephen Lee (11 July 2014 – 23 January 2016)
- Joseph Ha (11 July 2014 – Present)

=== Other priests of this diocese who became bishops ===
- Savio Hon, former Secretary of the Congregation for the Evangelization of Peoples from 2010 to 2017, He is now the Titular Archbishop of Sila and Apostolic Nuncio to Malta and Libya.

== Education ==
In the period before the handover of Hong Kong and in the period immediately after, the diocese had what the South China Morning Post referred to as "tight control" over the diocesan-operated schools. The 2004 school governance ordinance required each school to establish an incorporated management committee (IMC) that would manage each school. The diocese argued that this contradicted the Hong Kong Basic Law's article 141, which states that the management systems established by religious schools would continue as is.

== See also ==
- Anglican Diocese of Hong Kong Island
- Catholic Church in China
- Catholic Church in Macau
- Catholic Church in Taiwan
- List of Catholic Churches in Hong Kong
- Christianity in Hong Kong
- Sino-Vatican relations
