= Wah Yan =

Wah Yan may refer to:

- Wah Yan College, Hong Kong
- Wah Yan College, Kowloon
- Wah Yan College Cats
- Wah Yan Dramatic Society
- Wah Yan One Family Foundation
