= Wah Yan College =

Wah Yan College may refer to:

- Wah Yan College, Hong Kong, in Wan Chai, Hong Kong Island
- Wah Yan College, Kowloon, in Yau Ma Tei, Kowloon
