= Lutheran School For The Deaf =

Deaf school in Hong Kong

- Chinese: 路德會啟聾學校

Location
- 89 Hing Shing Road, Kwai Chung, New Territories; 22.3595988°N 114.1254036°E

Information
- Type: Deaf
- Motto: Chinese: 聾人得恩 (Blessing the Deaf)
- Religious affiliation: Protestantism
- Established: 1968; 58 years ago
- Founder: The Lutheran Church Hong Kong Synod
- President: Chen Yuxin; Chinese: 陳煜新
- Principal: Xu Jiaen; Chinese: 許加恩
- Gender: Mixed
- Enrollment: 64
- Capacity: 110
- Area: 4800 m^{2}
- Website: www.lsd.edu.hk

Chinese name
- Traditional Chinese: 路德會啟聾學校
- Simplified Chinese: 路德会启聋学校
Transcriptions
Standard Mandarin
- Hanyu Pinyin: Lùdéhuì Qǐlóng Xuéxiào
Yue: Cantonese
- Yale Romanization: Louhdāk'wúi káilùhng hohkhaauh
- Jyutping: lou6 dak1 wui2 kai2 lung4 hok6 haau6

The Lutheran School For The Deaf (Chinese: 路德會啟聾學校; Cantonese Yale: Louhdāk'wúi káilùhng hohkhaauh) is a special school for the deaf in Hong Kong founded by the Lutheran Church Hong Kong Synod. It provides primary and secondary education for the deaf. Students must be designated as having "severe hearing impairment" (hearing of both ears is impaired) to enroll with arrangement from the Education Bureau.

== History ==
The Lutheran School For The Deaf is founded in 1968. It was established on Cherry Street, Hong Kong. The school had to rent a part of Concordia Seminary in Yau Yat Tsuen due to insufficient classrooms for a time. In February 1990, a new campus in Kwai Chung finished . Both the primary and secondary department moved to the new campus.

In 2012, the school obtained HK$2.9 million from the Quality Education Fund to implement the Sign Assisted Instruction Programme from February 2012 to January 2015. In 2015, the school secured a further HK$2.4 million from the fund to continue the programme to July 2017.

From the 2018/19 academic year, with the dissolution of Chun Tok School, Lutheran School For The Deaf became the sole provider of primary and secondary education in the territory.

In January 2023, the school announced that all students were required to learn the national anthem and that it planned to add a choral component to the song.

== Curriculum ==
Lutheran School For The Deaf follows the mainstream academic structure, providing six years of free primary education, four years of free junior secondary education, and three years of free senior secondary school. Students enroll in the Hong Kong Diploma of Secondary Education on third grade of senior secondary education. Courses are taught by teachers that have been trained in special education. Both verbal and sign language instruction are used during lessons.

== Special education service ==
=== Deaf student support service ===
The school operates five centres around Hong Kong: on Hong Kong Island and in eastern New Territories, Kowloon, western New Territories, and Kwai Chung. These provide support services for deaf primary and secondary students.

=== Speech therapy service ===
A speech therapy service includes assessment, treatment, and counselling services for parents and teachers.

=== Hearing service ===
Hearing services include hearing aid checking, cochlear implant checking, battery purchasing service, earmould checking, and hearing assessment.

== Controversy ==
The principal of the school, Xu Jiaen, is also a member of the executive committee of the Hong Kong Society for the Deaf (香港聾人福利促進會). There were deaf reporting there were three members in the committee violating the society constitution as their total term lengths are longer than the upper limit of 30 years, so they were not elected properly. They also said they were suppressed when questioning during member meetings. The society responded by saying that the society constitution did not impose restrictions on total term length so the members were elected properly, but did not elaborate much beyond that.
