= Sign Assisted Instruction Programme =

Education programme

- Formation: February 2012; 14 years ago
- Founder: Lutheran School For The Deaf (funded by the Quality Education Fund)
- Type: Assisted instruction programme
- Purpose: Deaf education
- Website: www.lsd.edu.hk/hs

The Sign Assisted Instruction Programme (Chinese: 手語輔助教學計劃) is carried out by the Lutheran School For The Deaf starting from February 2012 with funding from the Quality Education Fund.

== Background ==
Most deaf students have cochlear implants subsidized by the Hong Kong government installed, but the senior communications officer of Equal Opportunities Commission, Chen Jie-zhen, pointed out that the ability of cochlear implants is limited. There are reports from students stating that only faint sounds can be heard most of the time and the implant cannot resolve learning difficulties. The Lutheran School For The Deaf teaches verbally, assisted by sign language so that students can learn more easily.

However, Hong Kong lacks an unified and complete sign language. Most sign languages are created by different local deaf organizations so a vocabulary may have several expressions. Moreover, most vocabularies are about daily life and specialized vocabularies related to education are insufficient.

== Goals ==
From February 2012 to January 2015, a three-year plan is carried out. The goals are:

1. Ensure teachers teach both verbally and with sign language
2. Establish a sign language education resource center
3. Sort out common sign language vocabularies to help deaf students systematically construct one common sign language to facilitate communication and learning
4. Develop specialized vocabularies for school subjects to help deaf students understand course content and consolidate learnt materials
5. Provide sign language training for teachers to facilitate teaching
6. Promote atmosphere of learning sign language
7. Support learning of sign language by relatives of deaf students
8. Provide deaf students and special needs teaching staff with channels for learning sign language to assist in learning and teaching

From February 2015 to July 2017, a two-year plan is carried out. The goals are:

1. Optimize visual sign language dictionary continuously to help deaf students balance sign language and oral development
2. Develop convenient sign language learning tool to promote development of sign language
3. Create a good listening atmosphere to decrease learning differences
4. Help teachers and deaf students to develop continuously
5. Develop perks of deaf students and provide vocational sign language training
6. Facilitate communication between deaf students and their parents
7. Promote sign language and deaf culture to foster school communion and professional interschool exchanges

== Reception ==
The founder of Silence, Polly Lam, said that the number of special schools for the deaf in Hong Kong has decreased from three to one. She also pointed out that previous special schools do not teach sign language so students who are deaf completely are forced to listen with little hearing ability or lip read. As a result, students cannot learn fully. Even if the family can afford tutoring, it wastes time. It makes students lose interest in learning and feel frustrated.

== See also ==
- Lutheran School For The Deaf
- Hong Kong Sign Language
- Deafness
