= Duel to the Death =

1983 Hong Kong film by Ching Siu-tung

- Theatrical poster
- 生死決
- Directed by: Ching Siu-tung
- Written by: Ching Siu-tung; David Lai; Manfred Wong
- Produced by: Raymond Chow
- Starring: Norman Chui; Damian Lau; Flora Cheong-Leen; Eddy Ko
- Cinematography: Danny Lee; Lau Hung-chuen
- Edited by: Peter Cheung
- Music by: Michael Lai
- Production company: Paragon Films
- Distributed by: Golden Harvest
- Release date: 13 January 1983
- Running time: 86 minutes
- Country: Hong Kong
- Language: Cantonese

Duel to the Death (生死決) is a 1983 Hong Kong wuxia film directed by Ching Siu-tung in his directorial debut, and written by Ching, David Lai and Manfred Wong. It starred Norman Chui, Damian Lau, Flora Cheong-Leen, and Eddy Ko. The film was released theatrically in Hong Kong on 13 January 1983.

== Synopsis ==
The film is set in 16th-century China. Every ten years, the greatest swordsmen from China and Japan would challenge each other to a duel to the death to defend their country's honor. As the date of the next duel approaches, Bu Qingyun and Hashimoto Ichirō (Note: The English subtitles on the 2021 Blu-ray release by Eureka Entertainment refer to the Japanese characters by different names than those used in previous international releases of the film. Norman Chui's character is referred to as "Miyamoto Ichiro" instead of the previous name "Hashimoto", while Eddy Ko's character is called "Kaneda", not "Kenji". According to Frank Djeng's audio commentary, this is because the translated names used on previous editions were mistranslated, and the replacement names are more accurate.), who represent China and Japan respectively, uncover a plot to rig the fight.

Bu is a peaceful and contemplative swordsman who was trained by Shaolin monks and a mischievous hermit, while Hashimoto is a pitiless yet honorable samurai. One night, Hashimoto is attacked by a masked man, whom he kills after a brief but intense clash. The masked man turns out to be Hashimoto's sensei, who hopes that his death will strengthen Hashimoto's resolve before the duel.

In the days leading to the duel, ninjas acting on the Shōgun's order work with Chinese collaborators to kidnap famous fighters and sabotage the duel so that Hashimoto will be killed. This plan will supposedly benefit both sides: the Chinese will enjoy the glory of victory, while the Japanese get to study and improve on Chinese martial arts. However, both Hashimoto and Bu are unwilling to go along with the plan, the former wanting only a fair duel and the latter refusing to be a pawn in the Shōgun's game.

Together, Bu and Hashimoto fight the conspirators and free the captives. Afterwards, Bu sees no point in proceeding with the duel, having grown weary of the bloodshed it has caused. Hashimoto, however, believes it is his duty to finish what he set out to do, so he kills Bu's master to force Bu to fight him.

The two swordsmen clash in a gravity-defying duel around a rocky coastline, with both mortally wounding each other. Hashimoto cuts off Bu's right arm and fingers on his left hand, while Bu spears Hashimoto through the torso. The duel ends inconclusively as either side waits to see who falls dead first.

== Cast ==
- Norman Chui as Hashimoto Ichirō
- Damian Lau as Bu Qingyun
- Flora Cheong-Leen as Xiahou Shengnan
- Eddy Ko as Kenji
- Chang Chung as Xiahou Yuan

== Release and reception ==
Duel to the Death was released on January 13, 1983, grossing a total of HK$5,158,322. In the Hong Kong film magazine City Entertainment Film Biweekly, a reviewer complimented the film as "quite outstanding" praising the editing and refreshing action scenes while finding that some characters were not drawn out enough. It was screened at the 30th Hong Kong International Film Festival in April 2006 as part of "A Tribute to Action Choreographers" event.

In 2014, Time Out polled several film critics, directors, actors and stunt actors to list their top action films; Duel to the Death was listed at 92nd place on this list. In the publication's subsequent list, published in 2020, the film was listed in the 100th position.

=== Award nominees ===
| Award | Date of ceremony | Category | Recipient(s) | Result | Ref. |
|---|---|---|---|---|---|
| Hong Kong Film Awards | 1984 | Best Editing | Peter Cheung | Nominated | |
| Hong Kong Film Awards | 1984 | Best Action Choreography | Ching Siu-tung | Nominated | |
