= Alan Hoo =

Hong Kong barrister

Alan Hoo Hong-ching SBS, SC, JP
- 胡漢清
- Born: 5 October 1951 (age 74); Hong Kong
- Education: St. Paul's College; London School of Economics
- Political party: Liberal Party
- Spouses: Flora Cheong-Leen (m. 1992; div. 1992) Yu Wai-man (m. 1999; div. 2008) Liz Kong (m. 2012)
- Children: 3

Alan Hoo Hong-ching, SBS, SC, JP (Chinese: 胡漢清; born 5 October 1951) is a Hong Kong barrister and politician. He is the chairman of the Basic Law Institute, Hong Kong member of the Chinese People's Political Consultative Conference (CPPCC) and vice-chairman of the Liberal Party.

== Biography ==
Hoo was born in 1950 in Hong Kong and was educated at the St. Paul's College. He later studied law at London School of Economics and was called to the Bar in England in 1973 and in Hong Kong in 1975. He became Queen's Counsel in 1990.

He was a member of the 400-member Selection Committee which was responsible for electing the first Chief Executive in 1996. The Selection Committee was replaced by the Election Committee in which Hoo has been a member through the Legal subsector until he was defeated in 2006. He returned to the Election Committee through Chinese People's Political Consultative Conference (CPPCC) subsector in 2011, in which he has been a Hong Kong delegate of the national advisory body. He was made Justice of the Peace in 2002 and was awarded Silver Bauhinia Star (SBS) in 2004.

Hoo had been the leading pro-Beijing voice in the legal sector. In 2010, he criticised the Civic Party and the League of Social Democrats launching the "Five Constituencies Referendum" movement to trigger a de facto referendum by resigning members of the Legislative Council from each constituency. He said the move challenged the Chinese sovereignty and urged the government to amend law to fill the loophole.

In 2014 in response to the Occupy Central plan put forwarded by the pro-democrats to occupy the financial district in Hong Kong to pressure to the government to implement universal suffrage, Hoo said that the People's Liberation Army (PLA) should act on the basis of the national security law with the vacuum left by the absence of the Hong Kong Basic Law Article 23.

He joined the pro-business Liberal Party in 2015 during the time the party leader James Tien was stripped of his seat in the CPPCC after Tien urged Chief Executive Leung Chun-ying to consider stepping down at the height of the 2014 Hong Kong protests. He became the vice-chairman of the party in October 2016.

In April 2016, Alan Hoo called on the Hong Kong government to immediately arrest members of newly-formed political parties, Demosisto and Hong Kong National Party (HKNP) of committing treason and sedition, over their advocacy on the Hong Kong independence.

In May 2017, Hoo shocked the public when he said all Hong Kong underground spaces belong to China. The remarks came when he argued for the Chinese officers' right to enforce mainland laws beneath the ground level in the cross-border terminus of the Guangzhou-Shenzhen-Hong Kong Express Rail Link Hong Kong Section. Hoo cited the 1997 decree by the PRC State Council which stipulated Hong Kong’s border details in which Hoo argued that the city’s autonomy only covered the land and sea "surfaces". Local legal professionals dismissed Hoo's remarks as "absurd" and legally erroneous.

== Personal life ==
He married Flora Cheong-Leen, a fashion designer and daughter of politician Hilton Cheong-Leen in 1992, but the marriage lasted only three months. He remarried in 1999 to Yu Wai-man and had two children. The couple divorced in 2008. In 2012, he married Liz Kong Hei-man and had a daughter together.

In 2013, Hoo's mother Linda Chuan Yun-chuu called a press conference alleging that her only son had barred her from their Pok Fu Lam home and a home she owned in Shanghai. She also claimed that Hoo had refused to take her phone calls for six months or to return HK$11 million in cash. Hoo denied the accusations and stressed that he loved his mother very much. The two parties issued a joint statement three weeks later stating that they had reached a "satisfactory" conclusion.
