= Wah Yan College Cats =

Hong Kong non-profit organization

- Logo of Wah Yan College Cats
- Traditional Chinese: 華仁爱貓組
- Simplified Chinese: 华仁爱猫组
Transcriptions
Standard Mandarin
- Hanyu Pinyin: Huárén Àimāozǔ
Yue: Cantonese
- Jyutping: wa4 jan2 oi3 maau1 zou2

Wah Yan College Cats is a non-profit organization in Wah Yan College, Hong Kong, which originally aims at looking after homeless cats which appeared in the campus of the college. It is the first to adopt the concept of college cats in Hong Kong. The teacher adviser is Ivy Ip Li Lan-Hing. The slogan of the organization is "Respect & Protect Life".

== Work ==
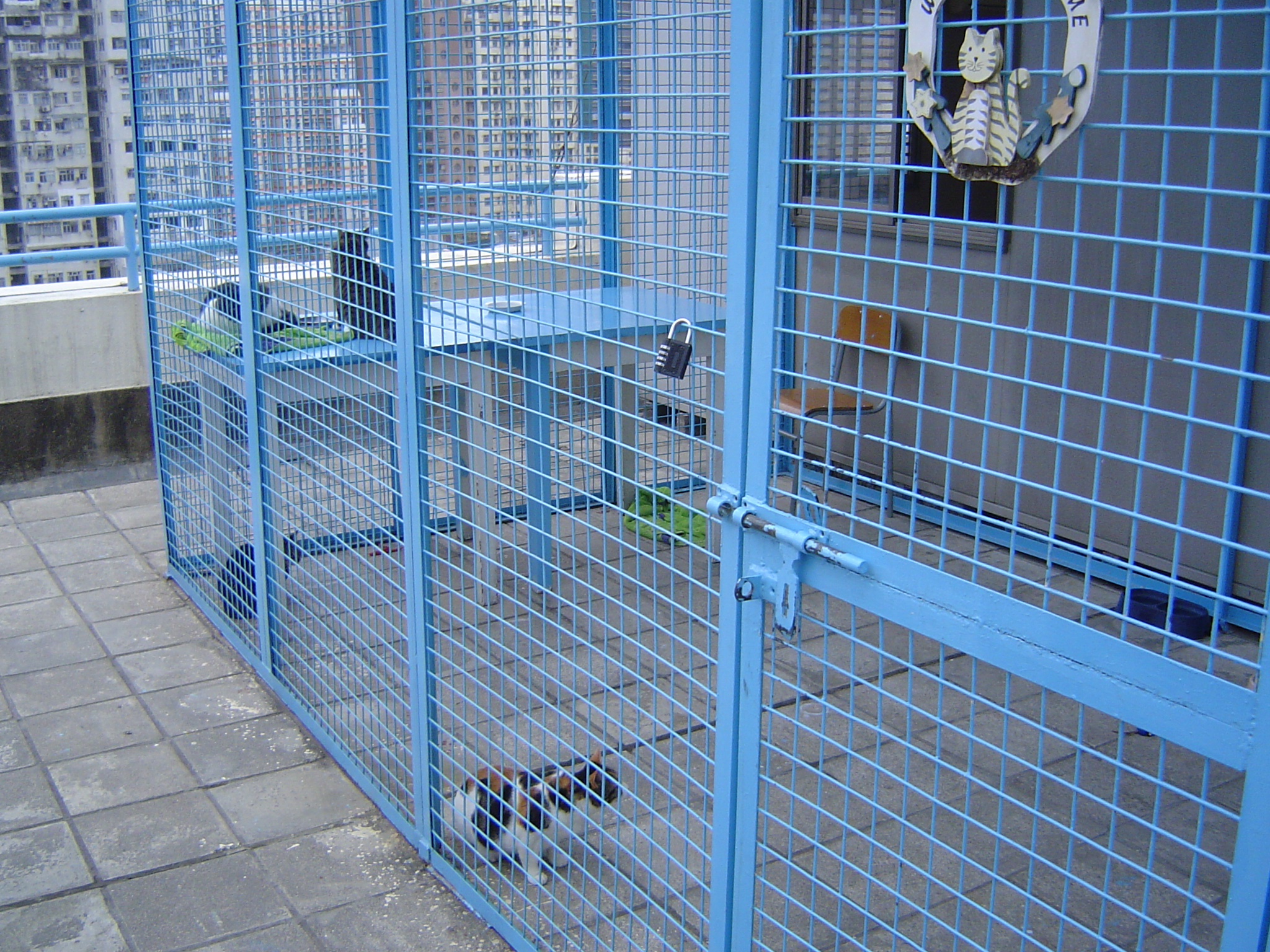
Cat house

The students in the organization are responsible for looking after the cats every day. Since establishment, the organization has taken care of about 40 cats. Apart from daily duties, the organization also promotes the message of protecting animals, and periodically writes articles for a cat magazine.

== History ==
Wah Yan College Cats dates back to 1993, when a cat appeared in the campus of Wah Yan College, Hong Kong. It was fed by the students and teaching staffs, and later more cats appeared. The club was made official by the school in 1999, and the organization was temporarily situated in a small underground room below the school canteen.

In 2000, the organization successfully applied for a fund of HK$98,000 from the Quality Education Fund in order to build a cat house, with a size of 180 square feet (17 m^{2}).

== See also ==
- Wah Yan College, Hong Kong
