= Wah Yan College, Kowloon =

All-boys secondary school in Hong Kong

Wah Yan College Kowloon
- 九龍華仁書院

Location
- 56 Waterloo Road; Yau Ma Tei; Hong Kong; 22.314577°N 114.17351°E

Information
- School type: Grant-in-aid, Secondary school
- Motto: Latin: In Hoc Signo Vinces; English: By this sign, you shall conquer
- Religious affiliation: Roman Catholic (Jesuits)
- Established: 20 November 1924; 101 years ago
- Founder: TSUI Yan Sau, Peter
- Status: Active
- Authority: Society of Jesus
- Medium of instruction: English
- School code: WYK
- President: Dr. SO Ying Lun (Supervisor)
- Principal: CHOW Tze Sze, Cecilia
- Grades: F.1 – F.6 (Formerly F.1 - F.7)
- Gender: Male
- Campus size: 41,000 square metres (4.1 ha)
- Campus type: Urban
- Colour: Green
Sports
Athletics baseball basketball football badminton cross country fencing	ice hockey orienteering swimming table tennis water polo
- Publication: Shield
- Newspaper: Signum
- Alumni: See below
- Sister school: Wah Yan College, Hong Kong
- Website: www.wyk.edu.hk

Wah Yan College, Kowloon
- Traditional Chinese: 九龍華仁書院
- Simplified Chinese: 九龙华仁书院
Transcriptions
Standard Mandarin
- Hanyu Pinyin: Jiǔlóng Huárén Shūyuàn
Yue: Cantonese
- Jyutping: gau2 lung4 wa4 jan2 syu1 jyun2

Wah Yan College Kowloon (WYK; Chinese: 九龍華仁書院; demonym: Wahyanite, pl.: Wahyanites) is a Catholic secondary school for boys run by the Chinese Province of the Society of Jesus. It is located in Kowloon, Hong Kong, and is a grant-in-aid secondary school using English as the primary medium of instruction. The total land area of its campus is among the largest for Hong Kong secondary schools, and it's one of the most prestigious schools in Hong Kong.

== History ==
=== Formative years ===
Established on 1 December 1924 as a branch of Wah Yan College, Hong Kong, by Mr. Peter Tsui Yan Sau (徐仁壽, formerly a teacher at St. Joseph's College), Wah Yan College Kowloon is one of the oldest and most prestigious secondary schools in Hong Kong, and was the first English-speaking college to be administered by local Chinese. During the 1930s, Mr. Tsui, himself a devout Catholic, saw the need of the pupils for greater spiritual guidance, and decided to gradually hand over the administration to the incoming Jesuits who were looking to serve in some local educational establishments. Besides the two Wah Yan Colleges, the Jesuits also sought to form a Catholic University in Hong Kong. But with the University of Hong Kong already established in 1911, the Jesuit fathers turned to organizing a Catholic hostel for its male students, which became Ricci Hall of the university. Mr. Tsui left Hong Kong and became a successful rubber planter and hotelier in Kota Kinabalu, British North Borneo (now Sabah, Malaysia). He died in Hong Kong on 19 February 1981, at the age of ninety three.

=== Pre-war developments ===
Before the Second World War, the school was located on Portland Street and then moved to Nelson Street in 1928. Under the auspices of A. E. Wood, Secretary for Education, the school was added to the Grant List and hence under Government subsidies. A satellite campus was opened at 103 Austin Road to cater to students in senior year. The premises became Tak Sun Primary School after the war. A South China Morning Post article in 1928 reported WYK to be the largest school in Hong Kong with a student population of 500. Despite new facilities, however, seniors had to cross Victoria Harbour for laboratory lessons at the Wah Yan College, Hong Kong.

In 1941 when Hong Kong was attacked by the Japanese forces, the Jesuits of the college helped organise the evacuation of the Kowloon civilians to the Island as they closed down the school. During the occupation, the Japanese prohibited its resumption on political grounds. The Nelson Street campus was so thoroughly looted that Mr. Chow Ching-nam (周淸霖), then Principal, could only salvage a small portion of school registers and documents, and the students had to bring in their own chairs when the college reopened after the war.

=== Expansion and maturity ===
Around 1947, the school authorities began the search for a new campus as its enrolment further increased. A proposed acquisition of a site on Ho Man Tin Hill Road was turned down. After negotiations with the Government of Hong Kong, a piece of former paddy field was granted and it moved to the current premises on Waterloo Road in 1952. This portion of land was large by Hong Kong standards, making WYK one of the largest campus in the urban Hong Kong area. This precedent was soon followed in the case of land provision for the Hong Kong campus, where the plot granted by the Government was also of significant size. The present campus was opened by the then Governor Alexander Grantham in 1953.

Also in the campus is the St. Ignatius Chapel, under the parish of St. Teresa's Church. Fr Stephen Law is the rector.

The school hymn of Wah Yan College Kowloon is Our Captain and Our King. The origin of the hymn is unclear, but it is believed to have originated from Northern England in the 18th century.

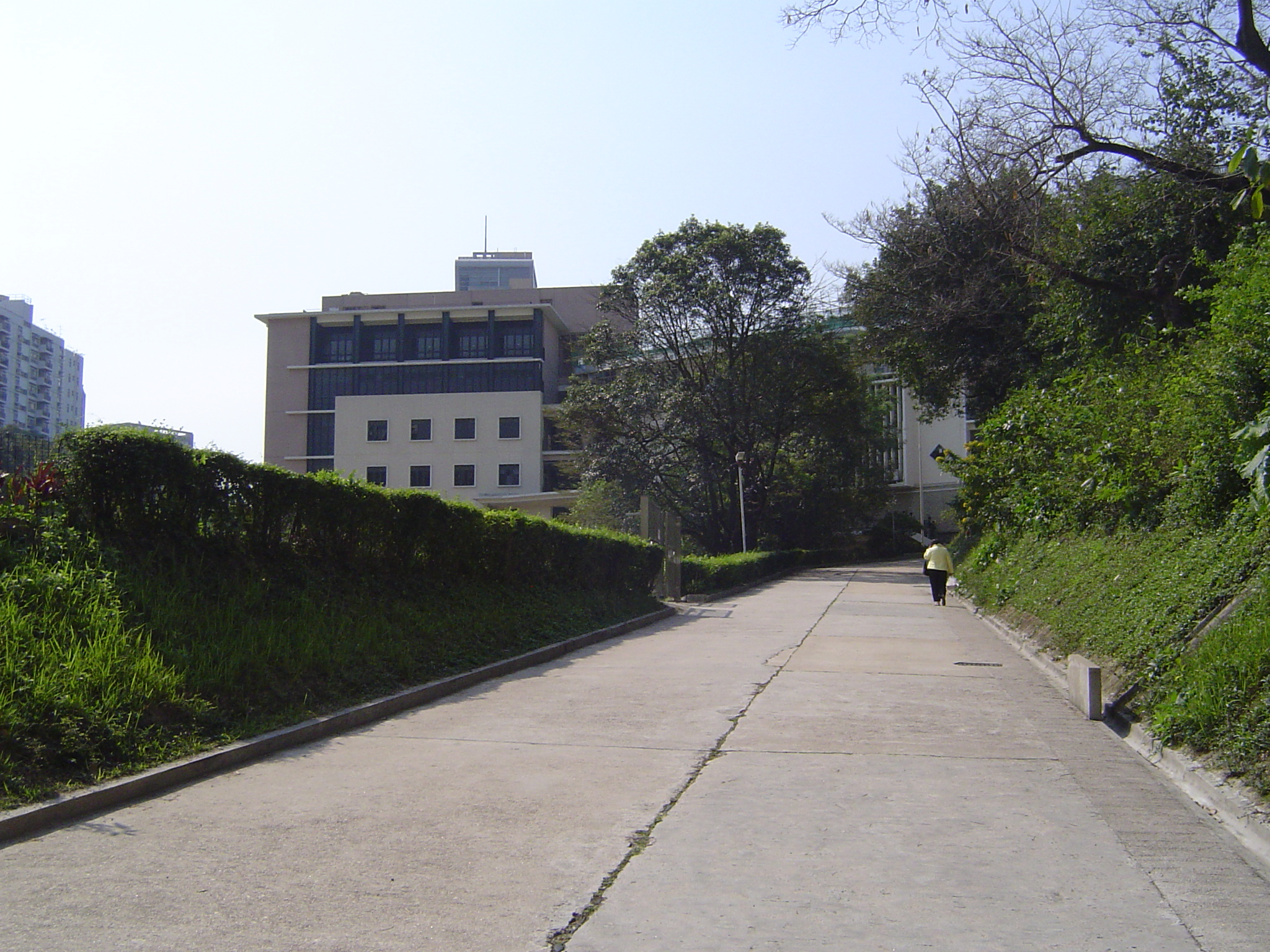
Wah Yan College, Kowloon

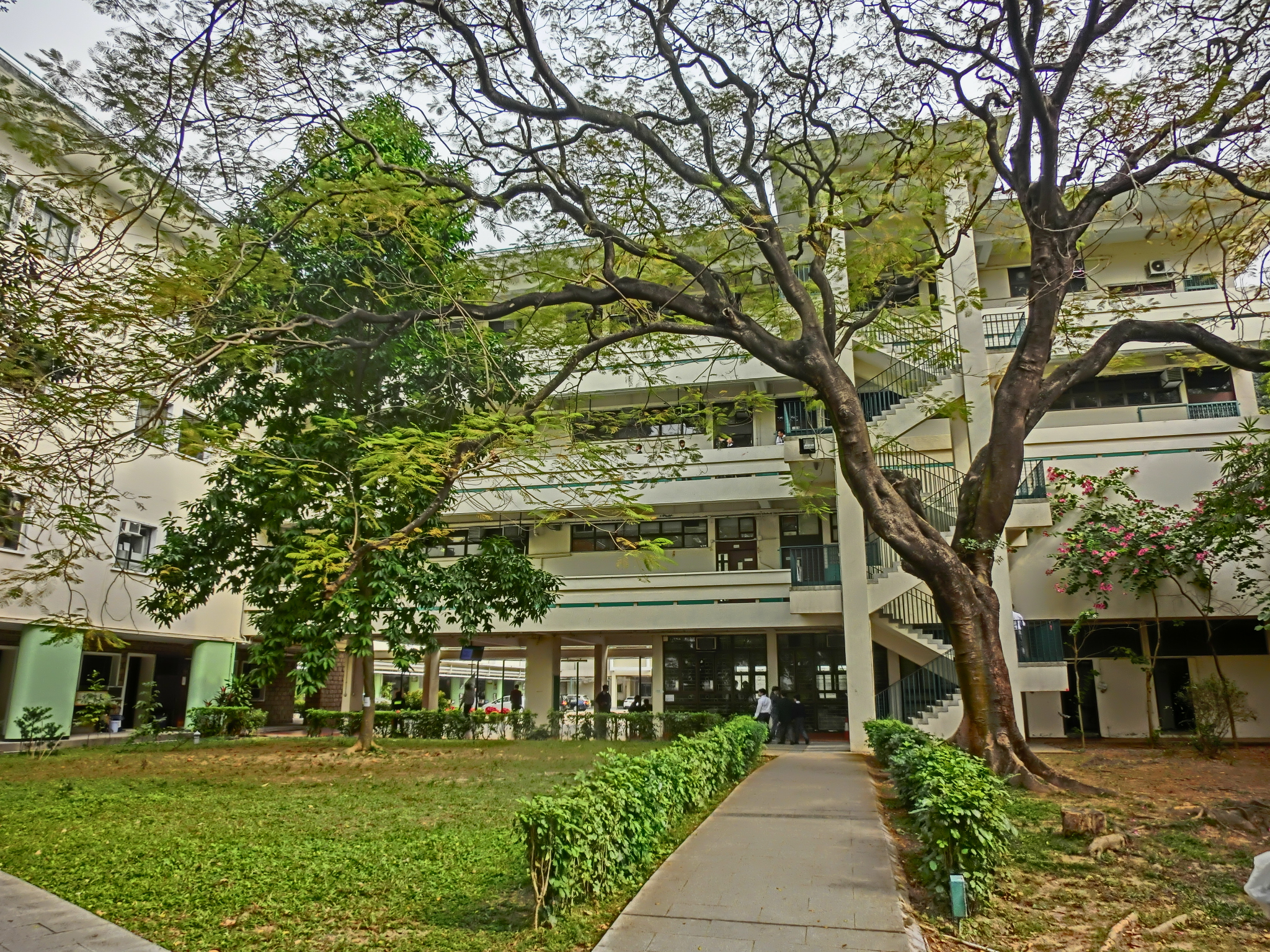
Photo taken from the West Gate, showing the main building (left) with the new additions Law Ting Pong building (right)

== Results of public examinations ==
Wah Yan College, Kowloon, has produced 8 perfect scorers "10As" in the history of Hong Kong Certificate of Education Examination (HKCEE) and 1 "Top Scorers" / "Super Top Scorers" in Hong Kong Diploma of Secondary Education Examination (HKDSE).

7 x 5** "Top Scorers" are candidates who obtained perfect scores of 5** in each of the four core subjects and three electives.

8 x 5** "Super Top Scorers" are candidates who obtained seven Level 5** in four core subjects and three electives, and an additional Level 5** in the Mathematics Extended (M1/M2) module.

== Notable alumni ==
=== Current Legislative Council Members ===
- TSE Paul (謝偉俊), member of the Legislative Council (Tourism FunctionalElection ConstituencyCommittee)

=== Politics ===
- LEE Martin Chu-ming (李柱銘), founding chairman of the Democratic Party
- LEECharles Yeh-kwongLee (李業廣), former member of the Executive Council of Hong Kong and former Chairman of Hong Kong Exchanges and Clearing Limited
- LAU Hon-chuen (劉漢銓), former chairman of the Hong Kong Progressive Alliance
- LEE John Ka-Chiuchiu (李家超), Chief Executive of Hong Kong
- LEE Philip S. (李紹麟), former Lieutenant Governor of Manitoba, Canada
- LEONG Alan Kah-kit (梁家傑), former leader of the Civic Party, former chairman of the Hong Kong Bar Association and candidate for Hong Kong Chief Executive Election in 2007
- SHIU Sin-por, head of the Central Policy Unit
- TO James Kun-sun (涂謹申), former member of the Legislative Council (Kowloon West)
- WONG Ernest Kwok Chung (王國忠), member of the New South Wales Legislative Council, Australia
- HOHo Kai-ming (何啟明), Under Secretary for Labour and Welfare, former member of the Legislative Council (Labour Functional Constituency)
- HO Kai-ming (何啟明), Under Secretary for Labour and Welfare, former member of the Legislative Council (Labour Functional Constituency)

=== Law ===
- LEONG Arthur Siu-chung (梁紹中) GBSLeong, Chief Judge of the High Court (2000-2003)
- Neoh, Anthony (梁定邦), senior counsel

=== Business ===
- CHAN John Cho-chak (陳祖澤), former chairman of Hong Kong Jockey Club; former managing director of Kowloon Motor Bus (1933) Ltd.
- YING Michael Lee-Yuen (刑李源), former chairman of Esprit Holdings Limited.
- NG Stephen Tin-hoi (吳天海), deputy chairman and managing director of Wharf Holdings Limited (九龍倉集團有限公司); chairman, deputy chairman of Wheelock and Company Limited (會德豐有限公司)
- YING Michael Lee-Yuen (刑李源), former chairman of Esprit Holdings Limited.

=== Medicine ===
- KWONG Yok Lam (鄺沃林), Chair Professor in Haematology and Haematological Oncology at the Department of Medicine of the University of Hong Kong

=== Academia ===
- MAK Tak Wah (麥德華)(class of 1962), Professorprofessor at the University of Toronto and the University of Hong Kong, Fellow of the Royal Society, Fellow of the Royal Society of Chemistry, Fellow of the Royal Society of Canada, Foreign Associate of the United States National Academy of Sciences, Founding Fellow of the Hong Kong Academy of Sciences, Awardee of the Canada Gairdner International Award; scientist (discoverer of T cell receptors, a key component of the human immune system),
- TSO Wung-Wai (曹宏威), an adjunct professor at the Chinese University of Hong Kong, also an active politician in Hong Kong

=== Entertainment ===
- Kenneth TSANG (曾江), actor in Hollywood productions such as Die Another Day
- CHAN Koon Chung (陳冠中), author of "The Fat Years (盛世)"

== See also ==
- Education in Hong Kong
- Wah Yan College, Hong Kong
- Wah Yan One Family Foundation
- List of secondary schools in Hong Kong
- List of buildings and structures in Hong Kong
- List of Jesuit sites
- Fo Pang
