= Lutheran Church-Hong Kong Synod =

The Lutheran Church—Hong Kong Synod (Chinese: 香港路德會) is a confessional Lutheran (信義宗) church body in Hong Kong. The LCHKS has nearly 40 congregations. The LCHKS grew from the China mission of The Lutheran Church – Missouri Synod (LCMS), which was established in the early 1900s. Many of the LCHKS parishes and schools are listed below.

== History ==
In 1915, missionaries were sent to China by The Lutheran Church–Missouri Synod (LCMS). The missionaries preached the Gospel along the Yangtze River (Changjiang) in Hupeh and Szechwan.

Following the Chinese Civil War, LCMS missionaries Rev. Wilbert Holt, Gertrude A. Simon, Martha Boss, and Lorraine Behling relocated from China to Hong Kong. From 1950 to 1954, the LCMS missionaries founded the Concordia Bible Institute to provide theological training to people in Hong Kong.

The Hong Kong Mission developed into an independent local church and registered as The Lutheran Church—Hong Kong Synod (LCHKS) in 1977. Currently, the LCHKS has about 9.000 baptized members.

In March 2018, the Asian headquarter of LCMS International Mission moved from Hong Kong to Taiwan, and LCMS sold three properties which was used by the gospel ministry of LCHKS. The move caused the LCHKS to suspend the partnership with LCMS.

Currently, the LCHKS is operating schools at kindergarten, primary, secondary levels serving nearly 20,000 students throughout Hong Kong.

== Partial list of congregations ==
=== Hong Kong Island ===
- Abiding Grace Lutheran Church (路德會永恩堂), Concordia Lutheran School-North Point
- Advent Lutheran Church of the Deaf (路德會主臨聾人堂), North Point
- Church of All Nations (路德會萬邦堂), Repulse Bay
- Eternal Life Lutheran Church (路德會永生堂), in Sai Wan Ho
- Grace Lutheran Church (路德會恩典堂), Sai Ying Pun
- Morning Star Lutheran Church (路德會晨星堂), Wan Chai
- Zion Lutheran Church (路德會錫安堂 ), North Point

=== Kowloon ===
- Cheung Sha Wan Lutheran Church (路德會頌恩堂(長沙灣)), Camp Street
- Christ Saviour Lutheran Church (路德會教主基督堂), Sham Shui Po
- Concordia Lutheran Church (路德會協同堂), in Yau Yat Tsuen
- Elim Lutheran Church (路德會以琳堂) - San Po Kong
- Holy Trinity Lutheran Church (路德會聖三一堂), in Kwun Tong Lutheran College, Kwun Tong.
- Hong Kong Lutheran Church for the Deaf (路德會香港聾人堂), Wong Tai Sin.
- Loving Shepherd Lutheran Church (路德會牧愛堂), in the Lutheran Church Hong Kong Synod-Martha Boss Lutheran Community Centre, Ho Man Tin
- Mung Yan Lutheran Church (路德會蒙恩佈道所), in Sau Mau Ping.
- Nathan Road Lutheran Church (路德會頌恩堂), in Tsim Sha Tsui,
- Redemption Lutheran Church (路德會救恩堂), Wong Tai Sin.
- Resurrection Lutheran Church (路德會復活堂), Sham Shui Po
- Saviour Lutheran Church (路德會救主堂), Sham Shui Po
- St Mark's Lutheran Church (路德會聖馬可堂), Yau Tong
- St Matthew's Lutheran Church (路德會聖馬太堂), in St. Matthew's Lutheran School (Sau Mau Ping), Lower Ngau Tau Kok Estate
- St Matthew's Lutheran Church (Branch) (路德會聖馬太堂(分堂)), in St. Matthew's Lutheran School, Lower Ngau Tau Kok Estate, Ngau Tau Kok
- St Philip Lutheran Church (路德會聖腓力堂), in Tsui Ping North Estate, Kwun Tong
- Sharon Lutheran Church (路德會沙崙堂), in Sharon Lutheran School, Tai Kok Tsui.
- Shepherd Lutheran Church (路德會牧民堂), in To Kwa Wan
- True World Lutheran Church (路德會真道堂), in Hung Hom

=== New Territories ===
- Abiding Spirit Lutheran Church (路德會沐靈堂), Gertrude Simon Lutheran College in Yuen Long
- Amazing Grace Lutheran Church (路德會沐恩堂), in Ma Kam Ming Charitable Foundation Ma Chan Duen Hey Memorial College, Tseung Kwan O
- Holy Cross Lutheran Church (路德會聖十架堂), in Tuen Mun
- Kowloon Deaf Lutheran Church (路德會九龍聾啞堂), in Lutheran School for the Deaf, Kwai Chung.
- Life Lutheran Church (路德會生命堂), in Sha Tin.
- Loving Heart Lutheran Church (路德會愛心堂), in Leung Kui Kau Lutheran Primary School, Sha Tin.
- Rock of Ages Lutheran Church (路德會恩石堂), in Kwai Chung
- St James Lutheran Church (路德會聖雅各堂), Tsuen Wan
- St John's Lutheran Church (路德會聖約翰堂), Tseung Kwan O

== Partial list of schools ==
=== Secondary schools ===
- Concordia International School (協同國際學校)
- Concordia Lutheran School, Kowloon (路德會協同中學)
- Concordia Lutheran School－North Point (北角協同中學)
- Gertrude Simon Lutheran College (路德會西門英才中學)
- Lui Ming Choi Lutheran College (路德會呂明才中學)
- Lui Cheung Kwong Lutheran College (路德會呂祥光中學)
- Ma Kam Ming Charitable Foundation Ma Chan Duen Hey Memorial College (馬錦明慈善基金馬陳端喜紀念中學)
- Lutheran School for the Deaf (路德會啟聾學校)
- Saviour Lutheran School (路德會救主學校)

=== Primary schools ===
- St. Matthew's Lutheran School (Sau Mau Ping) (路德會聖馬太學校(秀茂坪))
- Holy Cross Lutheran School (路德會聖十架學校)
- Sharon Lutheran School (路德會沙崙學校)
- Lui Cheung Kwong Lutheran Primary School (路德會呂祥光小學)
- Leung Kiu Kau Lutheran Primary School (路德會梁鉅鏐小學)
- Lutheran Tsang Shing Siu Leun School (香港路德會增城兆霖學校)

=== Kindergartens ===
- Chan Mung Yan Lutheran Kindergarten (路德會陳蒙恩幼稚園)
- Kin Sang Lutheran Kindergarten (路德會建生幼稚園)
- Hong Kong Lutheran Church Kwun Tong Kindergarten (香港路德會官塘幼稚園)
- Loving Heart Lutheran Kindergarten (路德會愛心幼稚園)
- Lui Cheung Kwong Lutheran Kindergarten (路德會呂祥光幼稚園)
- Rock of Ages Lutheran Kindergarten (路德會恩石幼稚園)
- Redemption Lutheran Kindergarten (路德會救恩幼稚園)
- Sharon Lutheran Church Kindergarten (路德會沙崙堂幼稚園(正校))
- Sharon Lutheran Church Kindergarten (Tsz Oi Branch) (路德會沙崙堂幼稚園(慈愛分校))
- St. James Lutheran Kindergarten (路德會聖雅各幼稚園)
- St. Philip Lutheran Kindergarten (路德會聖腓力堂幼稚園)
- Zion Lutheran Kindergarten (路德會錫安堂幼稚園)

== See also ==
- List of Lutheran denominations

== Print sources ==
- Our China Mission. Men and Missions IV. St. Louis: Concordia Publishing House, 1926.
- One Cup of Water International Lutheran Women's Missionary League (ILWML) paperback book, edited by Joyce Kerper Brauer, 1997.
