= Fo Pang =

Village in Hong Kong

Coordinates: 22.3145°N 114.1749°E

Fo Pang (Chinese: 火棚) is an area located in a valley of Kowloon, Hong Kong. It is at the northeast of Danger Flag Hill and south of Ho Man Tin proper. It is about present-day Wylie Road and east of Wah Yan College, Kowloon.

== History ==
At the time of the 1911 census, the population of Fo Pang was 180. The number of males was 126.

Before the construction of the college, the No. 1 Kowloon Cemetery for Europeans was located in the area and closed on 15 December 1933.

== Transportation ==
The East Rail line of the MTR passes through the area.
