= Kwong Yok Lam =

Hong Kong Haematologist

Professor Kwong Yok Lam
- 鄺沃林
- Education: Wah Yan College, Kowloon, University of Hong Kong
- Known for: Research on Oral Arsenic Trioxide, Acute Promyelocytic Leukaemia, T-cell lymphoma, Hematopoietic stem cell transplantation, CAR-T
- Scientific career
- Fields: Haematology
- Workplaces: University of Hong Kong
- Thesis: Cytogenetics and molecular genetics of haematological disorders (1995)
- Website: https://medic.hku.hk/en/Staff/University-Academic-Staff/Prof-KWONG-Yok-Lam/Prof-KWONG-Yok-Lam-Profile

Kwong Yok Lam (Chinese: 鄺沃林) is a Hong Kong haematologist. Prof Kwong is the Chair Professor and Chief of the Division of Haematology, Oncology and Bone Marrow Transplantation at the Department of Medicine, School of Clinical Medicine, the University of Hong Kong. He specialises in haematology and haematopathology. His clinical work focuses on the management of haematological malignancies. His research centres on the molecular pathogenetic pathways and novel treatment modalities in a variety of haematological neoplasms. Prof Kwong has pioneered the development and use of oral arsenic trioxide in the treatment of acute promyelocytic leukaemia and other blood cancers.

== Career ==
Kwong graduated from Wah Yan College, Kowloon in 1976. He obtained his MBBS degree with honours from the Faculty of Medicine of the University of Hong Kong at the top of his class with the John Anderson Gold Medal, CP Fong Gold Medal in Medicine, Digby Memorial Gold Medal in Surgery, Nesta and John Gray Gold Medal in Surgery, and Gordon King Prize in Obstetrics and Gynaecology in 1983. He then received his MRCP in 1986; FRCPath in 1991; FHKCP, FHKAM (Medicine), FHKCPath, and FHKAM (Pathology) in 1993; MD (HK) in 1995, and FRCP (Edin) in 1997. Kwong was also awarded a Croucher foundation-sponsored Fellowship at The Royal Marsden Hospital in 1987.

Kwong Yok-lam, in collaboration with Professor Cyrus Kumana, developed an innovative treatment for acute promyelocytic leukaemia at the University of Hong Kong. This oral arsenic-based drug, arsenic trioxide, created without external funding, has shown remarkable success with a cure rate of 98.2%. The treatment, safer and more cost-effective than intravenous arsenic, has replaced traditional bone marrow transplants in Hong Kong. This breakthrough marks Hong Kong's first drug invention.

In 2025, Kwong along with Dr Harinder Gill and Dr Alfred Tan Keng-Tiong from the University of Hong Kong developed an oral formulation of arsenic trioxide (Oral-ATO; ARSENOL) for the treatment of acute promyelocytic leukaemia.
