= Mount Parish =

Hill in Wan Chai, Hong Kong

Coordinates: 22.2743°N 114.1762°E

- Chinese: 巴里士山
Transcriptions
Standard Mandarin
- Hanyu Pinyin: Bālǐshì Shān
Yue: Cantonese
- Jyutping: baa1 lei5 si6 saan1

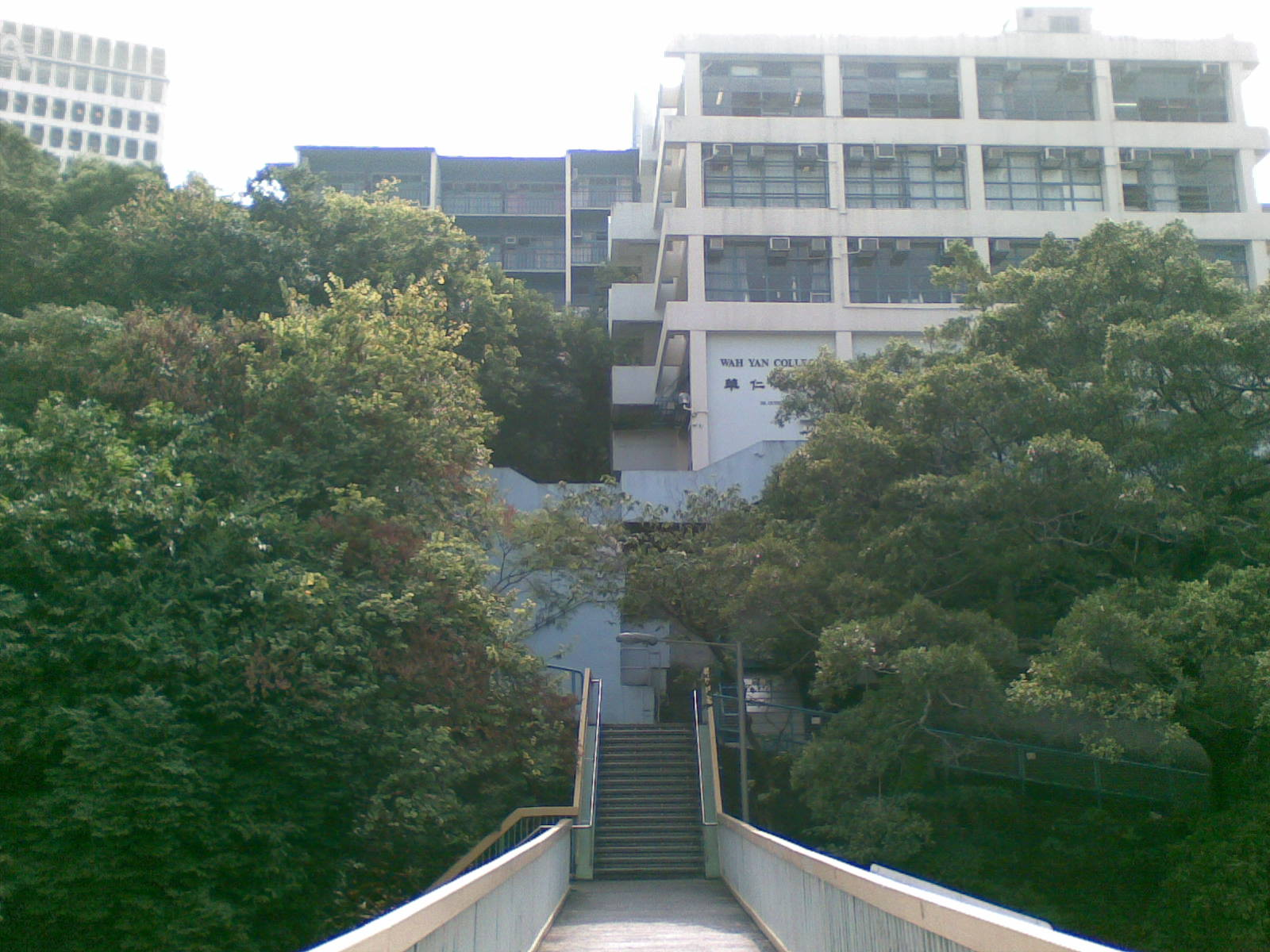
Mount Parish

Mount Parish is a hill in Wan Chai, Hong Kong, to the south of Queen's Road East, between Kennedy Road and Stubbs Road.

== History ==
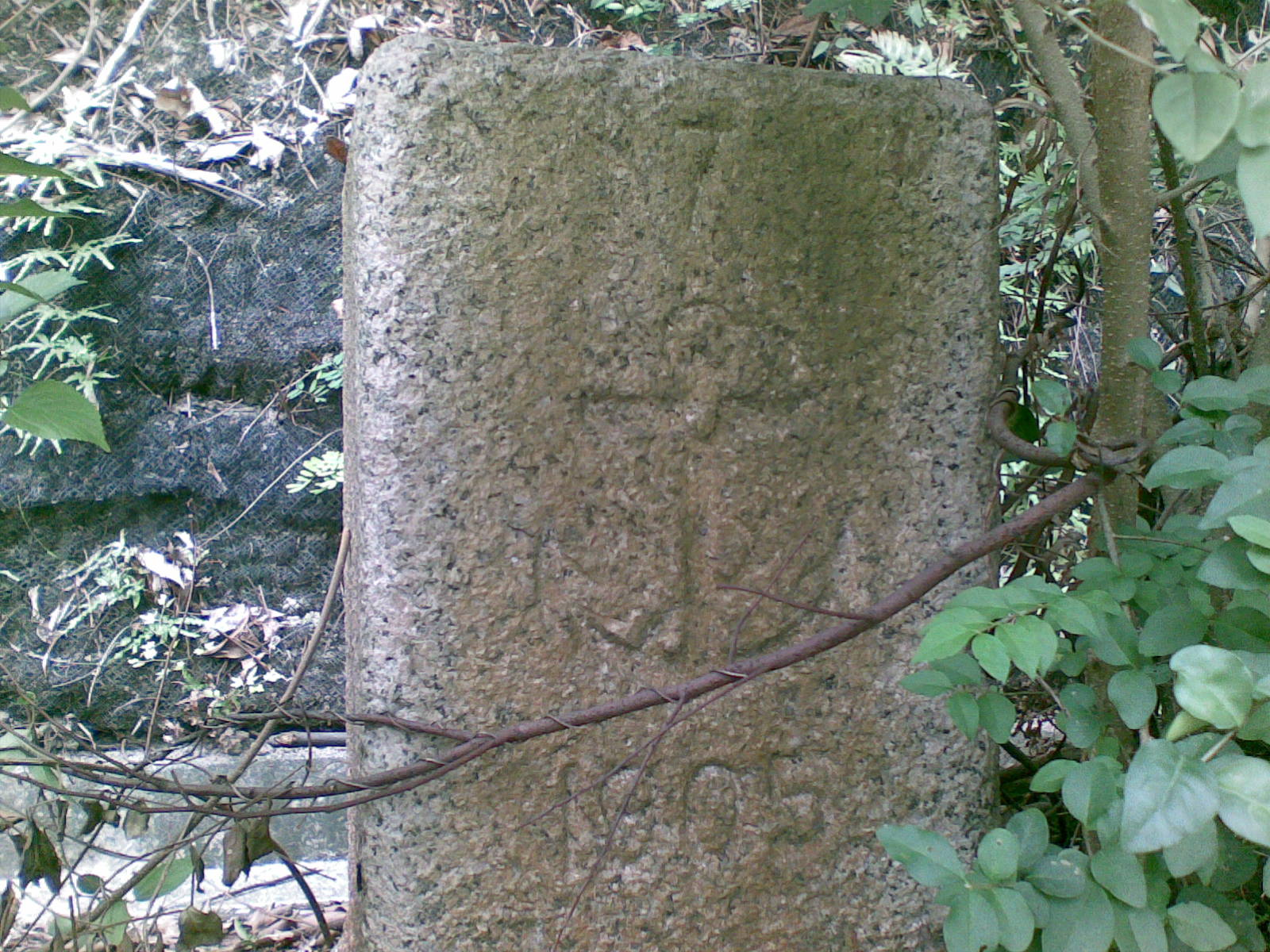
The pillar at the foot of the hill

In 1873 the Royal Navy bought the Seaman's Hospital in Wan Chai, which was running at a loss, using the money obtained by selling the hospital ship, HMS Melville. The Seaman's Hospital was renamed the Royal Naval Hospital, and the hill where the hospital stood was named Mount Shadwell, after Vice-Admiral Charles Shadwell, the Commander-in-Chief on the China Station. By 1931 the Infectious Diseases Hospital has been built on the neighbouring hill, which was renamed Mount Parish, after Commodore John E. Parish, the Naval Officer commanding in Hong Kong between 1873 and 1876. A granite pillar at the foot of the hill, beside Queen's Road East, acted as a boundary stone of Royal Navy lands. The pillar is inscribed with a '7', an anchor, and the year '1905'.

With the start of the Second World War, the Hong Kong Government built a network of air raid protection tunnels in order to prepare for a possible war with the Japanese Army. During the Battle of Hong Kong, the defenders of Hong Kong fought the Japanese in order to prevent the latter from advancing into Central. The buildings were damaged during the war.

After the war, the Ruttonjee Sanatorium took over the site of the Naval Hospital on Mount Shadwell. In the early 1950s the Infectious Diseases Hospital was demolished in order to make way for a new campus of Wah Yan College, Hong Kong, opened in 1955. By 1990 the name of Mount Parish has been dropped off from the map.

== Wahyanite campus ==
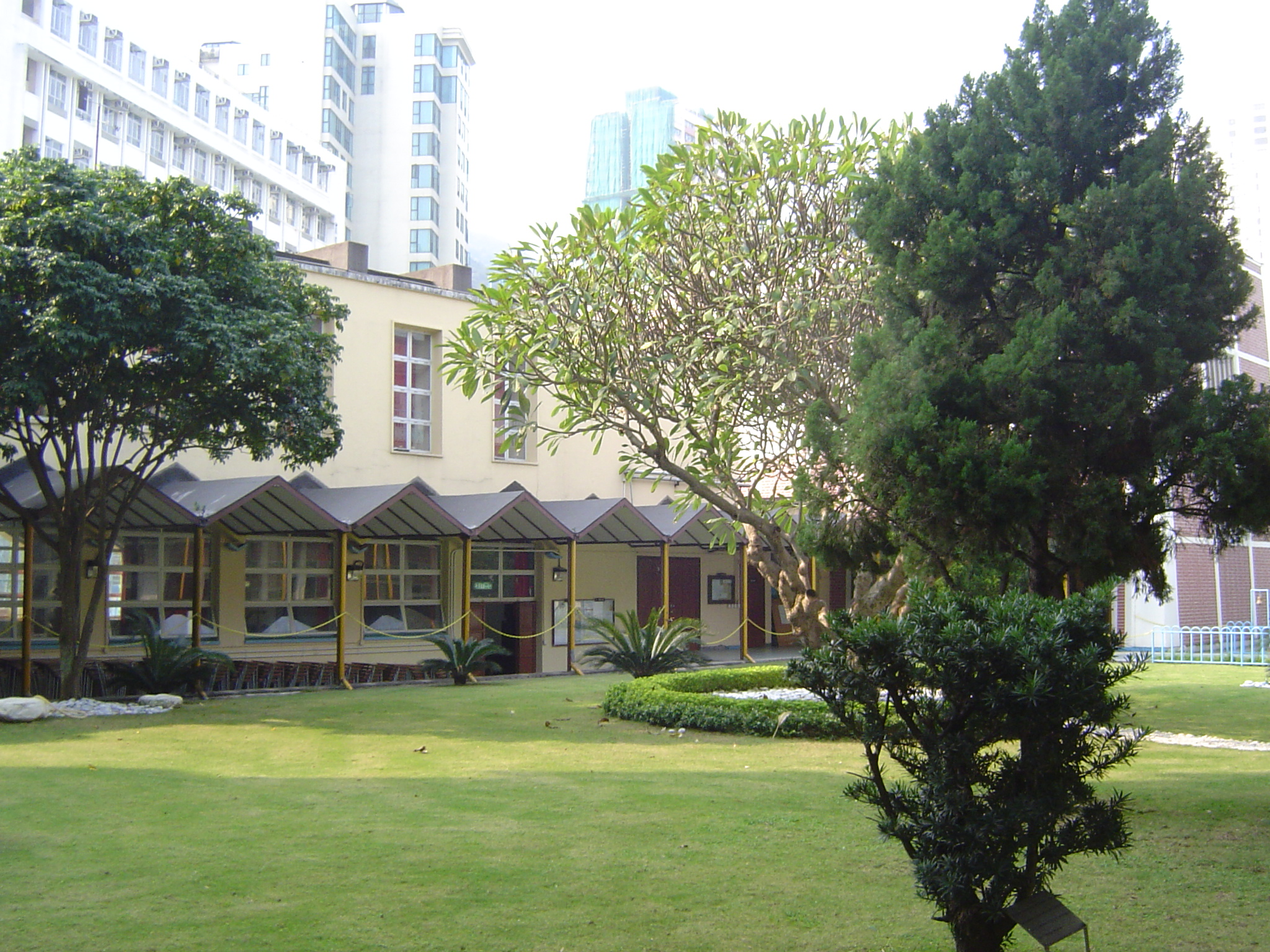
Wahyanite Campus

The campus of Wah Yan College, Hong Kong still stands at the top of the mount and covers an area of 20,000 square metres (220,000 sq ft). It was completed and officially opened on 27 September 1955 by the then Governor Sir Alexander Grantham, replacing the old campus at Robinson Road. It was designed by Professor Gordon Brown of the University of Hong Kong, containing classrooms, laboratories, a hall and a chapel.

An extension to the campus was completed in 1987 and named Gordon Wu Hall, after Sir Gordon Wu, a businessman who was an alumnus of the school. In 1992 a landslide at Mount Parish caused the death of a driver, who was buried alive in his car at Kennedy Road. The landslide prompted the rebuilding of six classrooms, to be reopened in 1998. In 2003 the music room was rebuilt into a six-storey complex. A plan to rebuild the hall was proposed in 2011. Construction work is undergoing. The old hall will be replaced with a six-storey complex, doubling its original size in terms of land mass.

== Air raid precaution tunnels ==
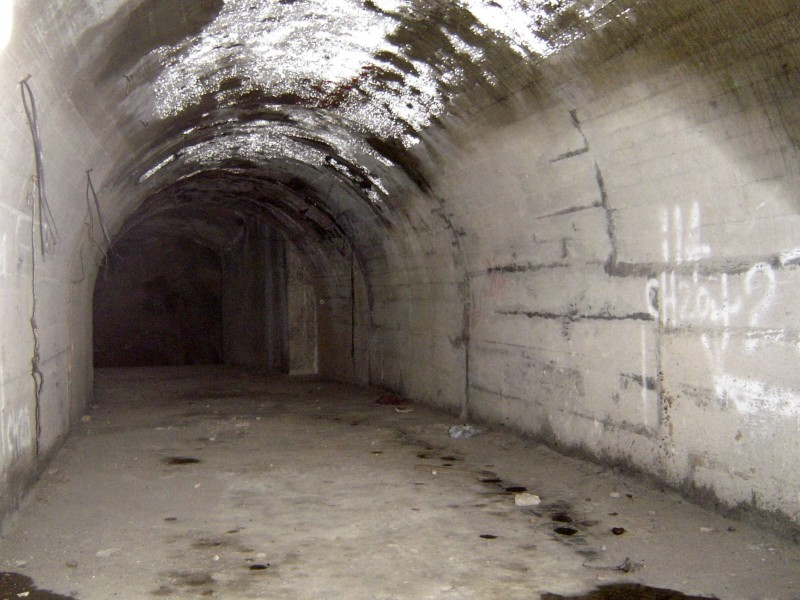
Interior of the ARP tunnels

Plan of the ARP tunnels

There is a network of air raid precaution (ARP) tunnels under Mount Parish, which was built by the Government some time before the Battle of Hong Kong in 1941. Like the other 28 ARP tunnels in Hong Kong, the purpose was to provide protection for citizens from air raids by the Japanese Air Force. The total length of the tunnels is 1.8 km, with two ventilation shafts and 13 portals numbered from 71 to 83, along the slope beside Stubbs Road, Queen's Road East and Kennedy Road. Most of the portals were filled in after the war, leaving only three portals which are currently accessible by related government staff, those with numbers 72, 80 and 81. Surveys made in the late 1970s and early 1980s revealed that the tunnels are divided into three levels, with connecting slopes between them.

In the evening of 24 December 1941, Major-General C. M. Maltby warned that the advancing Japanese forces might use the ARP tunnels for infiltration. The next day, which was Christmas Day, his dispatch reported at noon that Japanese artillery opened up at a large scale, and hand-to-hand fighting was reported by the defence forces on Mount Parish. Soon Mount Parish fell into Japanese hands. The defence forces then fought around Wan Chai Market in an attempt to stop enemy advance into Central, and at one time fired at the ARP tunnel exits using an 18-pounder gun to force the enemies out the tunnels. However within several hours Maltby advised the Governor that no further military resistance was possible, and the Governor surrendered to the Japanese, ending the Battle.

In the 1960s and 70s, a total of 55 cubic metres of radioactive waste was disposed of inside the ARP tunnels. The waste in the tunnels caused some safety concerns. In 1991, a Government report recommended the transfer of the waste to a special dedicated handling facility. On 19 January 2001 a man was found within the tunnels. He was examined at the scene by health physicists, and no radioactivity was found on his body and clothing. After that the Government built a new radioactive waste storage facility on Siu A Chau, and the waste that used to be in the tunnel was transferred to the new facility in 2005. The new facility was opened officially on 24 June 2006.
