= Flora Cheong-Leen =

Hong Kong actress and fashion designer

- 張天愛
- Born: Flora Zeta Elizabeth Cheong-Leen; November 20, 1959 (age 66); British Hong Kong
- Occupations: Fashion designer; former actress
- Spouses: Anthony (m. 1979; div. 1981) Michael Ying (m. 1987; div. 1990) Alan Hoo (m. 1992; div. 1992) Russell Wong (m. 2003; div. 2012)
- Children: 1
- Father: Hilton Cheong-Leen

Chinese name
- Traditional Chinese: 張天愛
- Simplified Chinese: 张天爱
Transcriptions
Standard Mandarin
- Hanyu Pinyin: Zhāng Tiān ài
Yue: Cantonese
- Jyutping: zoeng1 tin1 oi3

Flora Zeta Elizabeth Cheong-Leen (born November 20, 1959) is a Hong Kong actress and fashion designer.

== Biography ==
Cheong-Leen was born in Hong Kong. Her father Hilton Cheong-Leen was born in Georgetown, British Guyana and is of Chinese descent and her mother Pauline Chow is from Beijing.

She studied in the United Kingdom and France. After returning to Hong Kong, Cheong-Leen was selected as leading actress in 10 full-length motion pictures including Life after Life (Cinema City), Duel to the Death (Golden Harvest), Chasing Girl (Cinema City), Return of the Deadly Blade (Champion International Film), Lung Gem Wei (Golden Harvest), and Cactus. After a brief career as a film actress, she went on to create fashion designs and costumes.

Cheong-Leen launched her first clothing line, Pavlova, in 1981. Pavlova was followed by the Tian Art label, and Cheong-Leen couture collection.

== Personal life ==
Cheong-Leen has been married and divorced four times. She has a daughter, Claudine, with her second husband, Michael Ying.
