= Wah Yan One Family Foundation =

- Traditional Chinese: 家一華仁
- Simplified Chinese: 家一华仁
Transcriptions
Standard Mandarin
- Hanyu Pinyin: Jiāyī Huárén
Yue: Cantonese
- Jyutping: gaa1 jat1 wa4 jan2

Wah Yan One Family Foundation is a charity organization which aims at raising money for the two Wah Yan Colleges, Wah Yan College, Hong Kong and Wah Yan College, Kowloon, and also Pun U Association Wah Yan Primary School.

Logo

== Establishment ==
The foundation was incorporated in 2004 by the past students of the two "Wah Yan"s, with an initial capital of HK$10 million. According to Ng Tin Hoi, an alumnus of WYK, it is necessary to raise funds to improve the teaching standards of the two schools, such as implementing small class teaching in junior form Chinese, English and Mathematics, despite the limited funding from the Hong Kong Government. The foundation plans to raise funds adequate for ten years' use. The target for the first phase of fund raising is $100 million.

Alumni of the two schools have welcomed the foundation; Yuen Tin Fan, former vice-chairman of PCCW and an alumnus of WYK, donated $10 million together with James Loh, an alumnus of WYHK to start the fund raising campaign. Stanley Ho also donated $5 million. Relative of the late Mike Chu, husband of Cherie Chung and alumnus of WYK, also announced after his death in 2007 that ceremony money can be donated to the foundation.

== Activities ==
=== Walkathon ===
The first activity organized by the foundation is a walkathon from WYK to WYHK on 7 October 2007. Chief Executive Donald Tsang led the starting ceremony on his 63rd birthday. The occasion was attended by some 3500 people, including alumni such as Gordon Wu, Stephen Lam, Anthony Wu and Michael Suen. A cheque handover ceremony also took place.

A Mass preceding the walkathon was attended by 500 people. The walkathon started at Wah Yan College Kowloon at 9am, and participants walked towards Wah Yan College Hong Kong by way of Wylie Road, Gascoigne Road, Chatham Road, Tsim Sha Tsui promenade, ferry from Tsim Sha Tsui to Wan Chai, O'Brien Road and Johnston Road, elapsing about three hours for the trip. The activity raised about $45 million.

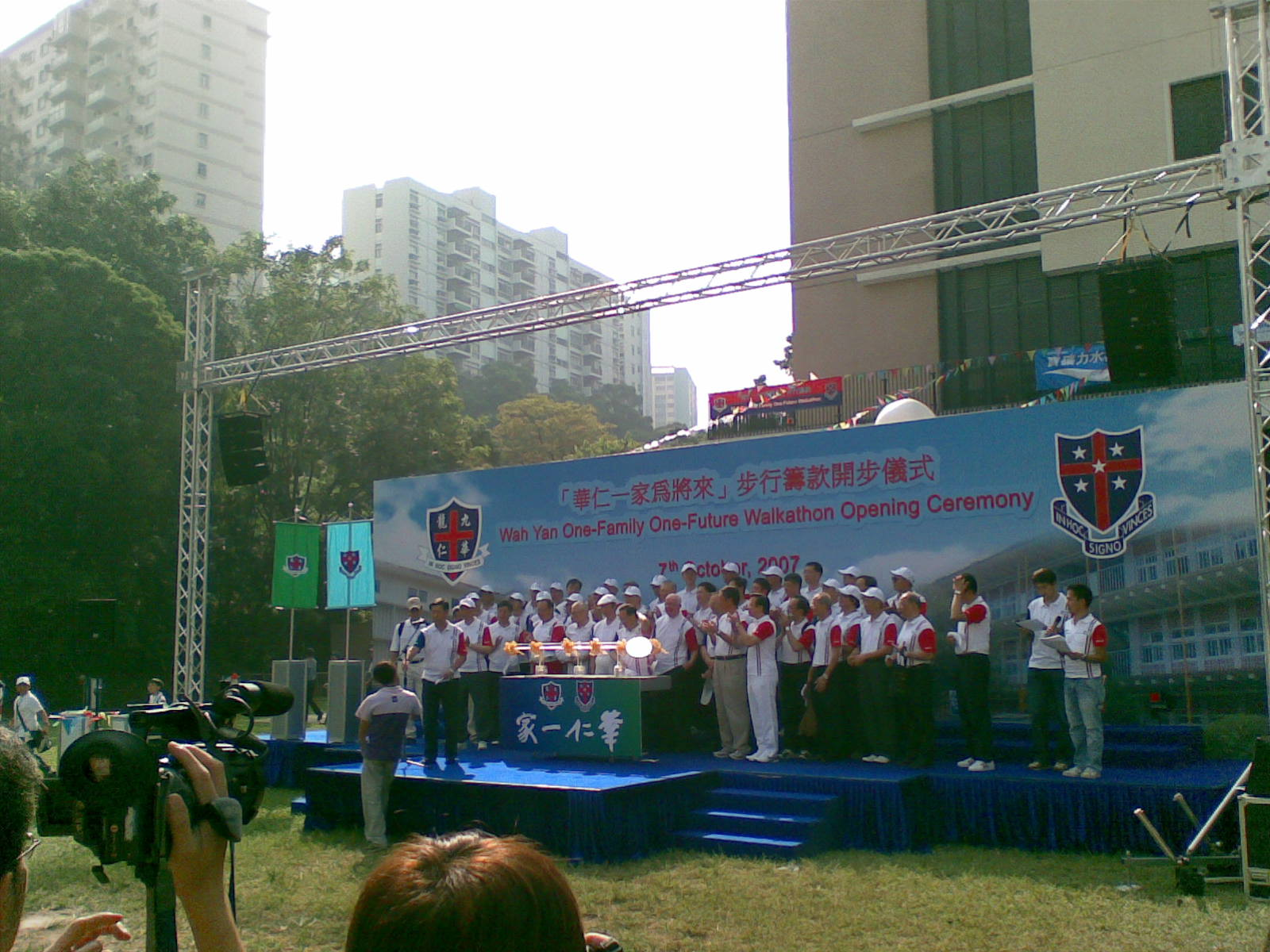
Opening ceremony of the walkathon

=== Movie premiere ===
On 27 March 2008 the foundation organized a premiere of the movie Three Kingdoms: Resurrection of the Dragon, distributed in Hong Kong by Sundream Motion Pictures, a subsidiary of i-Cable Communications, the chairman of which is Stephen Ng, an alumnus of WYK. Over $1 million was raised.

=== Banquet ===
The foundation held a banquet in the InterContinental Hong Kong with 50 tables. An auction was held, raising $590,000. One of the items being auctioned was a one-day boat trip offered by Henry Cheng, Managing Director of New World Development, dealt at $100,000. Among the alumni present were Donald Tsang, Gordon Wu, Stephen Lam, James To, Albert Lai and Alan Leong.

=== George Lam concert ===
The foundation held a concert on 27 September 2008 at Hong Kong Convention and Exhibition Centre, inviting George Lam and Esther Chan to sing a total of over 20 songs. On the foundation's part, it supplied a crew of over 600 people for the performance, consisting of teachers and students from the two schools, including an orchestra of 75 people, five a capella singers, and also 500 Wahyanites plus seven Chinese-drummers for the song A Man Should Better Himself. A band of 6 alumni forming a band called "The Campians" also performed in the concert. The target for the concert was $3 million. The concert eventually raised a sum of $4 million, bringing the total amount raised by the foundation to over $50 million.
