= Wah Yan College, Hong Kong =

Secondary school in Hong Kong

- 香港華仁書院

Location
- 281 Queen's Road East, Wan Chai, Hong Kong; 22.27408°N 114.17615°E

Information
- Type: Roman Catholic grammar school Grant-in-aid All-male Secondary education institution
- Motto: Latin: In Hoc Signo Vinces; English: In this sign you shall conquer
- Religious affiliation: Roman Catholic (Jesuit)
- Established: 16 December 1919; 106 years ago
- Founder: Tsui Yan Sau Peter
- Supervisor: Fr. Wong Ting Yuet, Alan, S.J.
- Principal: Dr. Chan Wai Lun Davis
- Chaplain: Fr. Zhang, John Joseph, S.J.
- Grades: F.1 – F.6 (Equivalent of Grades 7–12)
- Medium of instruction: English
- Enrollment: 802
- Campus size: 20,000 square metres (2.0 ha)
- Campus type: Urban
- Colours: Blue and red
Sports
Basketball Football Volleyball; Beach volleyball Athletics Badminton; Cross country Fencing	Ice hockey Lawn bowling Orienteering; Squash Swimming; Table tennis Tennis; Water polo
- Nickname: Wahyanite
- Yearbook: The Star
- Alumni: See below
- Alma Mater song: Wah Yan College School Song
- Website: www.wahyan.edu.hk

Wah Yan College, Hong Kong
- Traditional Chinese: 香港華仁書院
- Simplified Chinese: 香港华仁书院
Transcriptions
Standard Mandarin
- Hanyu Pinyin: Xiānggǎng Huá Rén Shūyuàn
Yue: Cantonese
- Jyutping: hoeng1 gong2 wa4 jan2 syu1 jyun2

Wah Yan College, Hong Kong (WYHK) is a Catholic all-boys grant-in-aid secondary education institution run by the Society of Jesus in Wan Chai, Hong Kong. It was founded by Peter Tsui Yan Sau on 16 December 1919. It was a non-sectarian school when it was founded, and the Jesuits took over the operation of the school in 1932.

Subsidised by the Government of Hong Kong, WYCHK is a grammar school using English as the medium of instruction (except for Chinese Language and Chinese History). There are around 60 teachers and 800 students. It is a sister school of Wah Yan College, Kowloon.

The school has an enrolment of approximately 800 students with 60 teachers and a few Irish Jesuit fathers. The supervisor of the school is Rev. Fr. Clement Tsui, S.J., who is an alumnus of the school and a Roman Catholic Jesuit priest, and serves concurrently as Rector of Wan Yan College Chapel, located within the campus under the parish of St. Margaret's Church near Leighton Hill. The principal of the school is Davis Chan, the second alumnus of St. Joseph's College, Hong Kong to become the principal of the college after the founder Peter Tsui Yan Sau.

== History ==
=== The beginnings ===
The school was founded by Peter Tsui Yan Sau on 16 December 1919 on the 3rd and 4th floors of 60 Hollywood Road, which houses the Kung-Lee sugar cane juice store (公利真料竹蔗水) and is listed as a Grade II Historic Building. On the first day of school there were only four students. In subsequent years, the school also used 54A Peel Street and 33 Mosque Junction as campuses. As the number of students rose, the school moved to a new campus at 2 Robinson Road (the present site of Bishop Lei Int'l House and Raimondi College) after Lunar New Year 1921. On 1 October 1922, the school was listed as a Grant-in-aid school. In 1924, a Kowloon branch was established in Mongkok. A hostel in Wah Yan opened in 1927. That same year the first Irish Jesuit Fr John Neary came to Wah Yan and taught religious studies.

=== Wah Yan under the Irish Jesuits ===
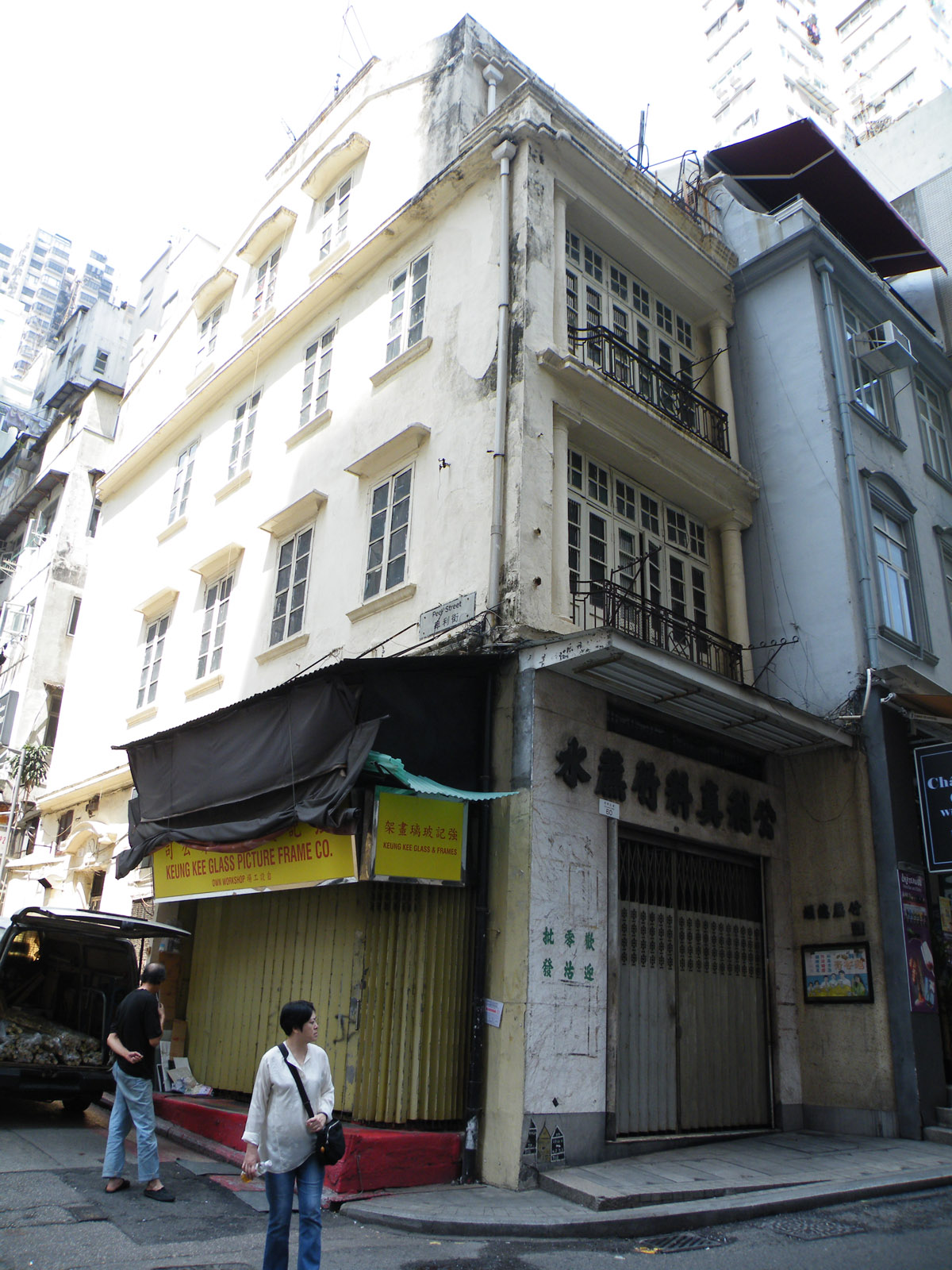
First campus (1919 to 1921): 3rd and 4th floor of 60 Hollywood Road, Central in April 2012

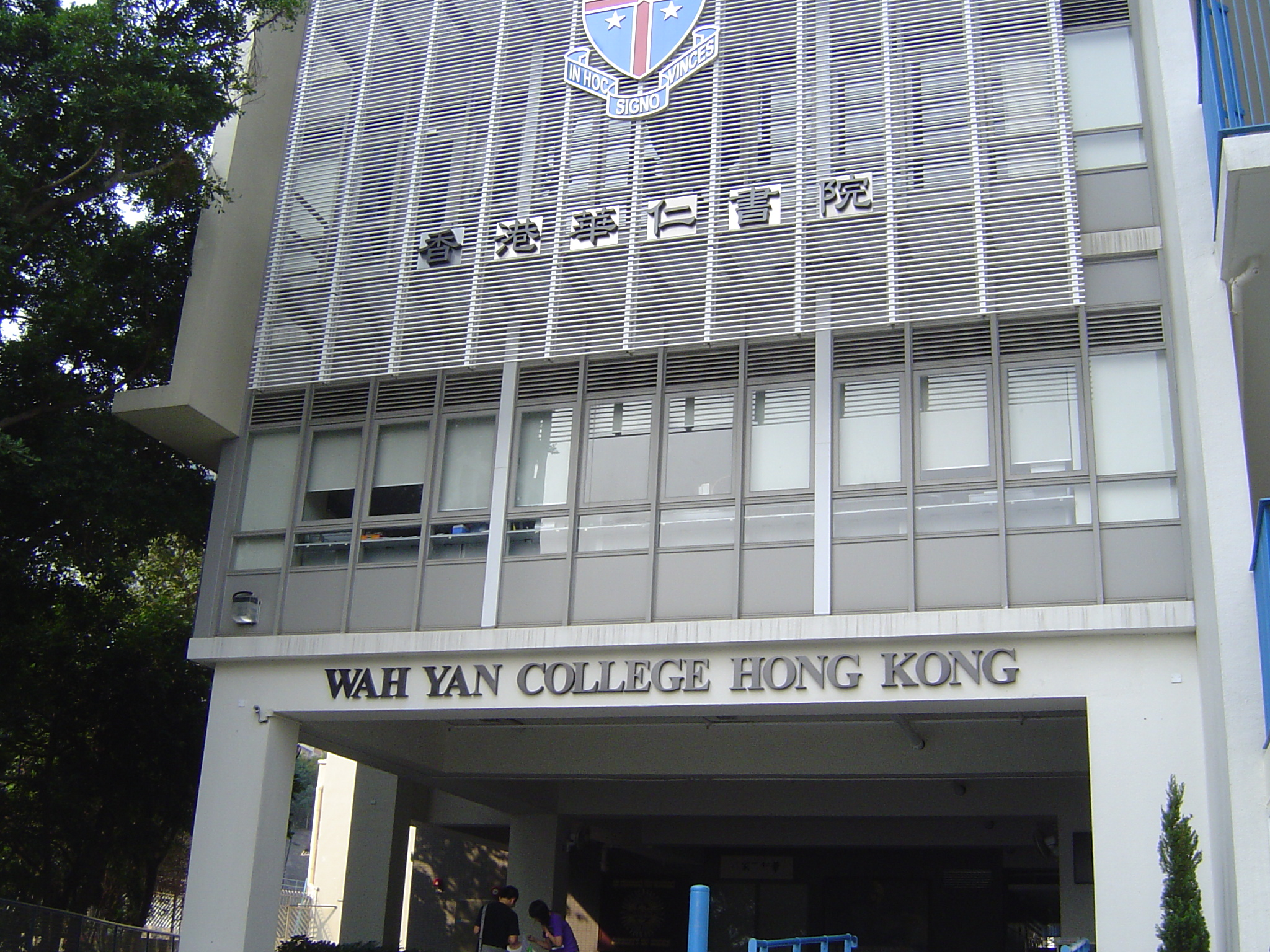
Current campus (1955 to current): 281 Queen's Road East, Wan Chai in November 2006

In 1932 the school was transferred to the Society of Jesus, after a long series of negotiations between the original administration and the Jesuit fathers. The transfer was completed on 31 December, and Fr Gallagher, S.J., replaced Lim Hoi Lan as the headmaster. The school was also given a new name: College of Christ the King.

In 1933, the college published the first volume of its yearbook, The Star. A house system was introduced in 1934. In 1940 the hostel was closed down.

=== Wartime Wah Yan ===
In December 1941, with the invasion of Hong Kong by Japanese troops, classes were suspended. Fr Gallagher and Fr McAsey were interned by the Japanese.

During the War, Wah Yan continued operations in Macau for a period of time.

There was another Wah Yan set up during the occupation (called "Wah Yan Chung Hok", meaning Wah Yan middle school) but it closed down shortly before the war ended.

=== Post-war development ===
After the Japanese troops surrendered, the school reopened on 8 September 1945. Later in the year, Wah Yan Middle School was re-established as the Chinese stream of the school. In March 1946, the Wah Yan Dramatic Society, consisting mainly of alumni of the school and Wah Yan College, Kowloon, commenced activities, and was officially founded the following year. Its first production was "The Thrice Promised Bride".

A night school was started on 17 February 1948. The next year, an afternoon school opened. In 1950 the Chinese stream of the school was closed down.

In 1951, the classes were renamed "forms": Class 1 became Form 6, Class 2 became Form 5, and so on. Class 7 and Class 8 were renamed Primary 6 and 5 respectively.

In 1952 the afternoon school was also closed.

=== Queens Road East "Mount Parish" era ===
In 1954, construction for a new campus at Mount Parish, Wan Chai started. On 27 September 1955 the new campus was formally opened by Sir Alexander Grantham, then Governor of Hong Kong.

The school newspaper, "Starlet", was established in 1964. In 1971, Wah Yan College, Hong Kong helped to manage the then Pun U Primary School while the Pun U Association remaining the school sponsoring body. The primary school was renamed Pun U Association Wah Yan Primary School, and was established as the feeder primary school. The night school was closed in 1984. The streaming to Arts and Science began in Form 4 in 1986.

On 12 April 1987, the Gordon Wu Hall to the north of the main building was opened. In the same year, Wah Yan achieved its first "10 A's" in the HKCEE examinations.

On 8 May 1992, heavy rainfall caused a severe landslide at the junction of Kennedy Road and Queen's Road East. It killed the driver of a passing car. The landslide caused the laboratory block to sink. Cracks were found in the playground and a crack in the classroom block had to be covered with stainless steel plates. Six classrooms (2H, 2K, 4H, 4K, 6S2, 7A) were demolished in 1993 as a result of the landslide. They were rebuilt and were reopened in 1998. The same year, three Wah Yan students achieved "10 As" in the HKCEE.

The first version of the school website was set up by Dr Ashley Cheng in 1994. In 1997, the Parent-Teacher Association was established. In 1998, all classrooms were fitted with air-conditioning.

=== School development project ===
There had been plans to redevelop the school since 1995. However, the initial plans were aborted due to lack of funds and local law restrictions on architecture. In 2001 the Education and Manpower Bureau planned to upgrade all existing schools in Hong Kong to millennium standard, and the college successfully applied for part of the necessary funds for redevelopment. The School Development Project (SDP) was formally launched on 26 January 2003, and works were officially started on 25 May 2003 with the demolition of the old music room block.

The original aims of the SDP were to:

- Upgrade the school campus to millennium standards
- Provide extra classrooms required by the "through-train" education mode
- Construct a new assembly hall that can accommodate all students at the same time

The total cost of the SDP was estimated to be HK$104m. It was to be carried out in three phases:

- Rebuilding the existing music room into a 6-storey multi-use complex. The cost was HK$38.9m.
- Extension of Phase 1. The cost was HK$4.82m.
- Rebuilding the hall. This phase has yet to be completed and the cost is estimated to be HK$57m.

Funding for Phase 1 is by the Hong Kong Government's Quality Education Fund and the School Improvement Programme. Funding for Phases 2 and 3 are by fund-raising campaigns hosted by the school.

Phases 1 and 2 (New Annex) have already been completed and were formally opened on 31 January 2006 by Mr Donald Tsang, the Chief Executive of Hong Kong. Phase III consists of a new school hall annexe with a much larger hall that can accommodate all the students in the school. The annexe will also house five extra classrooms and a lecture theatre.

Phase III was originally estimated to be completed by December 2006; however, lack of funds greatly delayed the completion time. In the summer of 2011, works for Phase III finally started while fund-raising was still in progress. The old school hall has already been demolished. In 2014, the new Wu Jieh Yee Building housing the school hall was finished.

== Achievements ==
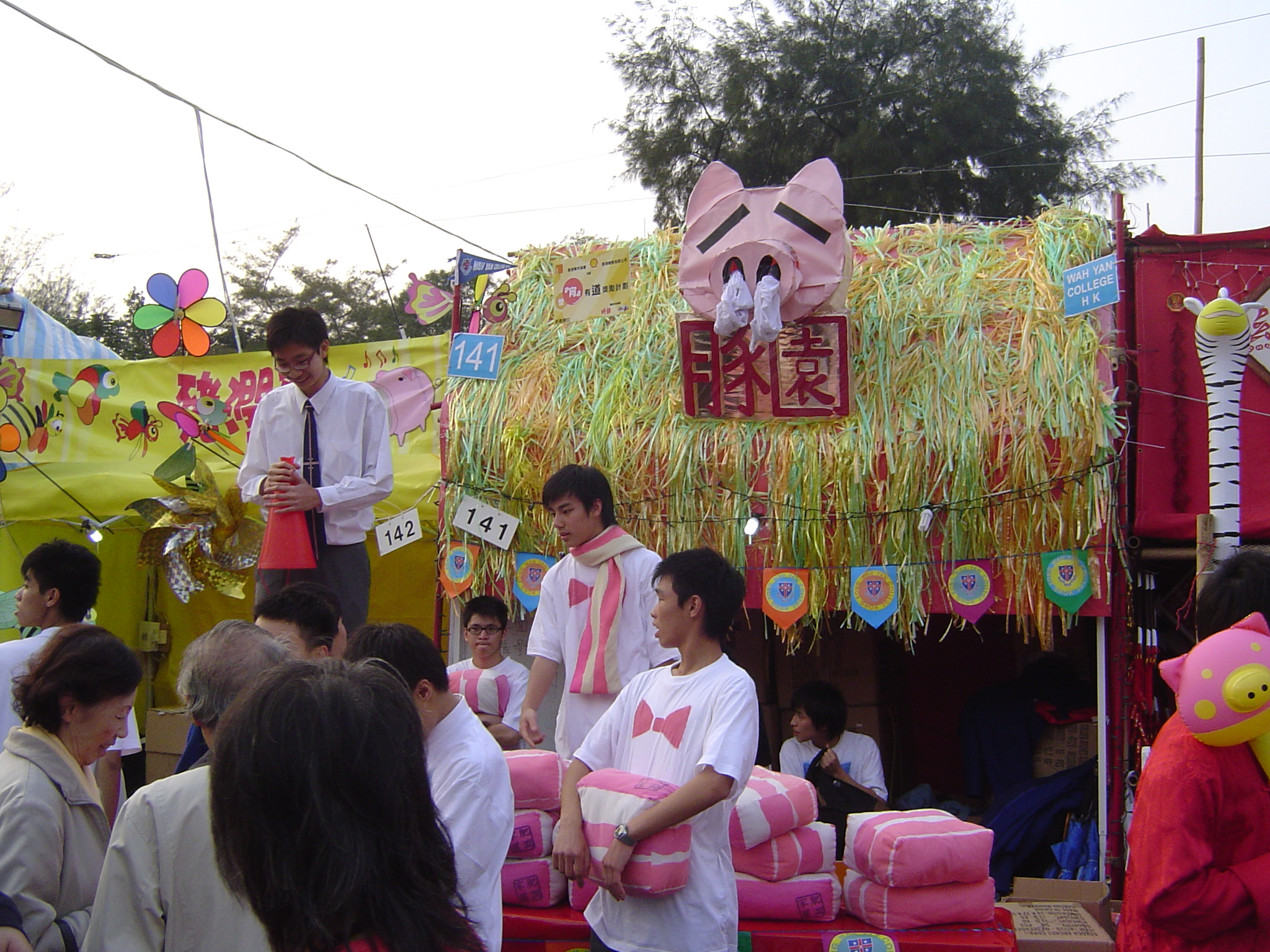
The Lunar New Year Fair stall put up by students from the college in February 2007.

- WYHK counts five winners of the Hong Kong Outstanding Students Awards, ranking 16th (tied with La Salle College, Madam Lau Kam Lung Secondary School of MFBM, and Queen Elizabeth School) among all secondary schools in Hong Kong.
- In 2007 the student organisation of the college participated in the Lunar New Year Stall Competition co-organised by Shell and the Hong Kong Youth Federation and won the grand prize of $10,000.

== Campus ==
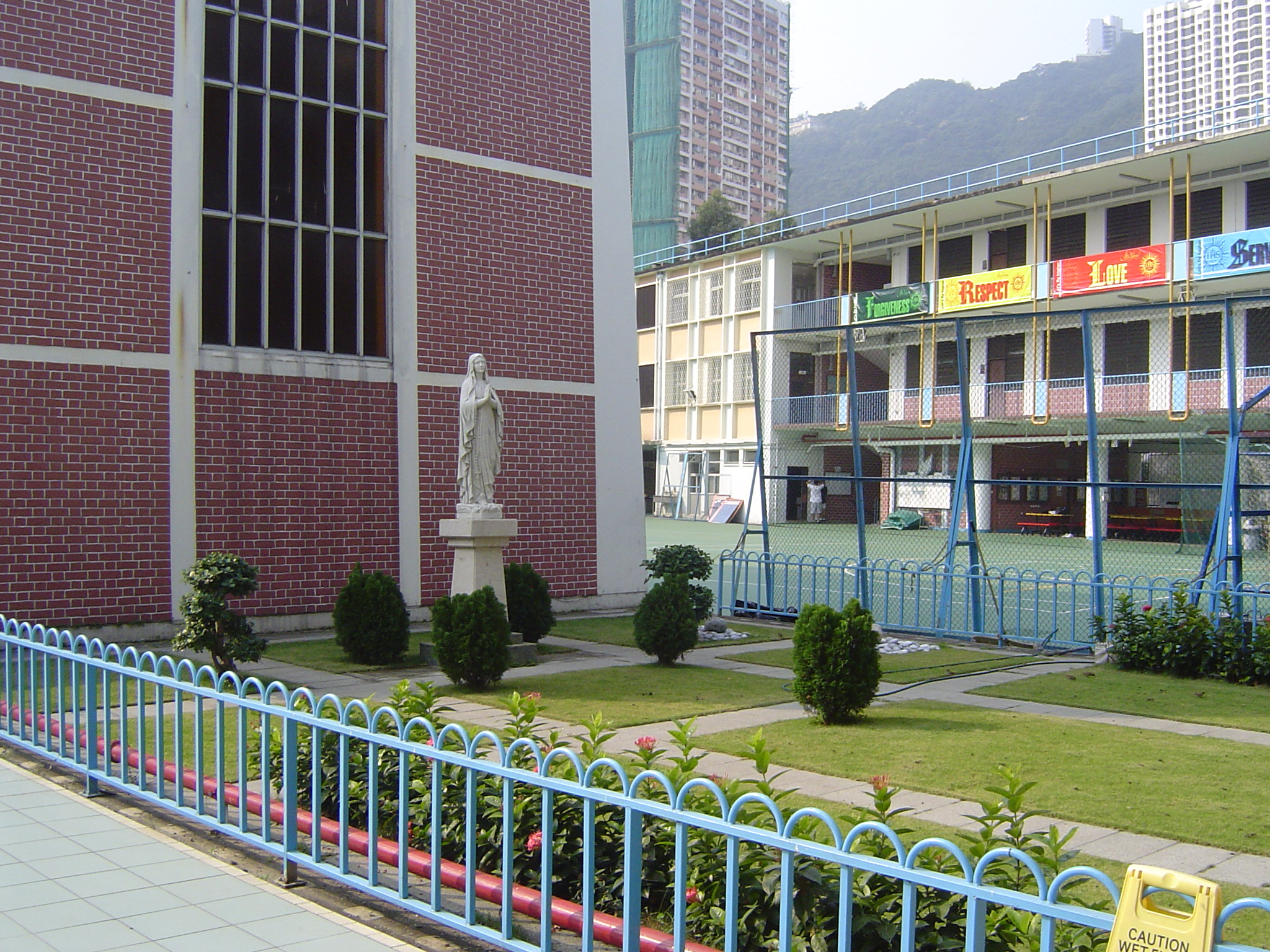
Chapel (left) & Laboratory Block in November 2006

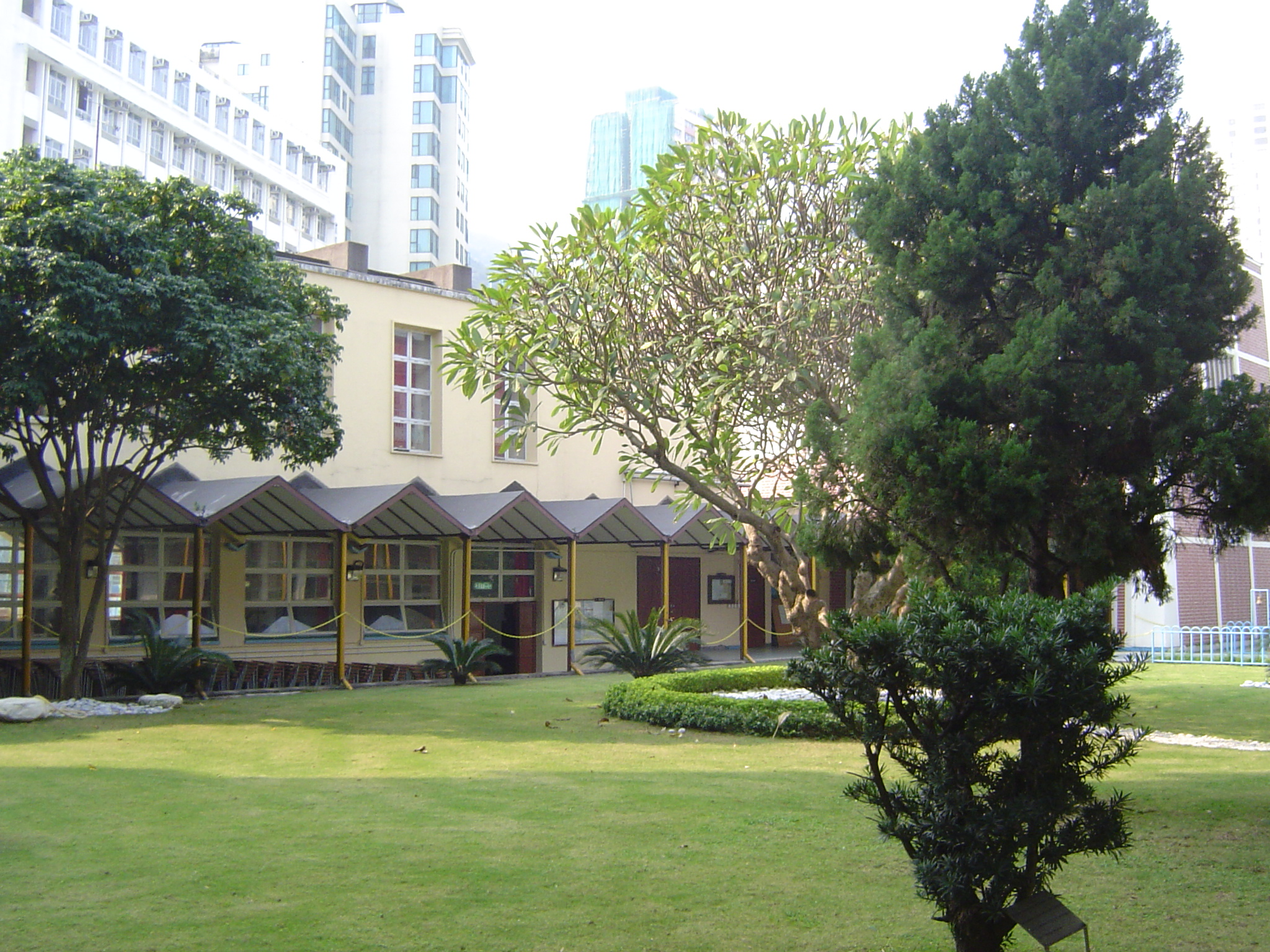
Old school hall and lawn in November 2006

The campus at 281 Queens Road East, Wan Chai has an area of about 20,000 m^{2} (220,000 square feet), on a small hill known as Mount Parish. It was designed by the late Professor Gordon Brown, the founder of the Architecture Faculty of Hong Kong University.

== Principals ==
Name	Year
1. Mr. Tsui Yan Sau, Peter (徐仁壽)	1919–1926
2. Mr. Lim Hoy Lan, Andrew (林海瀾)	1926–1932
3. Fr Richard W. Gallagher, S.J.	1932–1940
4. Fr Edward Bourke, S.J.	1940–1948
5. Fr Albert Cooney, S.J.	1948–1951
6. Fr John Carroll, S.J.	1951–1956
7. Fr Cyril Barrett S.J.	1956–1962
8. Fr Joseph Foley, S.J.	1962–1968
9. Fr Alfred Deignan, S.J. (狄恆神父)	1968–1970
10. Fr Cyril Barrett, S.J.	1970–1982
11. Fr Derek Reid, S.J.	1982–1985
12. Fr Marciano Baptista, S.J. (白敏慈神父)	1985–1988
13. Fr John C. Coghlan, S.J.	1988–1996
14. Mr. Tam Siu Ping, George (譚兆炳)	1996–2013
15. Dr. So Ying Lun (蘇英麟)	2013–2019
16. Dr. Chan Wai Lun, Davis (陳偉倫)	2019-

== Academics ==
=== New senior secondary curriculum ===
Since the academic year of 2009–2010, the school has provided a new curriculum for senior students alongside the planned educational reform by the Hong Kong Government.

The HKDSE subjects that are now offered are Chinese Language, English Language, Mathematics, Liberal Studies, Chinese History, Economics, Ethics and Religious Studies, Geography, History, Biology, Chemistry, Physics, 'Business, Accounting & Financial Studies', Music, and 'Information & Communication Technology'.

Music, Art, Ignatian Value Education, and also Religious Formation, Life Education or Moral & Civic Education will be offered as non-examination subjects.

== List of Top Scorers in Public Examinations ==
Wah Yan College, Hong Kong has produced 17 perfect scorers "10As" in the history of Hong Kong Certificate of Education Examination (HKCEE) and 1 "Top Scorers" / "Super Top Scorers" in the history of Hong Kong Diploma of Secondary Education Examination (HKDSE).

7 x 5** "Top Scorers" are candidates who obtained perfect scores of 5** in each of the four core subjects and three electives.

8 x 5** "Super Top Scorers" are candidates who obtained seven Level 5** in four core subjects and three electives, and an additional Level 5** in the Mathematics Extended (M1/M2) module.

== Extracurricular activities ==
Extracurricular activities are divided into groups A and B. Group A contains school organisations and clubs/societies operated by students. Group B contains Catholic organisations, sport teams and other unclassified organisations.

Each student may participate in four Group A activities at most. The maximum number of Group B activities that a student may join is left to the discretion of the teacher advisers and parents concerned.

=== Student Association ===
The Student Association of Wah Yan College, Hong Kong is the student organisation body which has the highest position in the school's management structure. It is led by current students, with the approval of the School Authorities (the School Authorities refer to the Principal, Assistant Principals, the teacher advisers and the ECA Committee of Wah Yan College, Hong Kong) through yearly Student Association election.

The Student Association (SA) is a non-profit making body, which aims to promote the welfare of the students of WYHK and thus to serve the whole student body. The SA allows the students to participate in the administration of the school in matters concerning their welfare. The primary function of the SA is the organisation and co-ordination of all students; and arrangement of extra-curricular activities in the school.

In the year 2020–21, two cabinet (Novus and Contineo) arose to compete for being the SA. Eventually, Novus won the election by 325 supporting vote, against Contineo's 152 supporting votes, becoming the SA of the next academic year.

List of SA cabinets:

Academic Year	Name of SA cabinet
44th SA (2010–2011)	Zenith
45th SA (2011–2012)	Nexus
46th SA (2012–2013)	Zafar
47th SA (2013–2014)	Iznova
48th SA (2014–2015)	Lumino
49th SA (2015–2016)	Zefiro
50th SA (2016–2017)	Conditus
51st SA (2017–2018)	Vincio
52nd SA (2018–2019)	Candesco
53rd SA (2019–2020)	Eredità
54th SA (2020–2021)	Aspirant
55th SA (2021–2022)	Novus
56th SA (2022–2023)	Venoria
57th SA (2023–2024)	Equinex
58th SA (2024–2025)	Eunestra

=== Wu Jieh Yee Library ===
Located on the second floor of the Francis H B Wong Teaching Building, the Wu Jieh Yee Library of Wah Yan College, Hong Kong was opened in 2005 with the opening of this new annexe. The library has over 10,000 books available as of October 2024. It also offers printing and computer services.

=== Prefects' Board ===
The Prefects' Board is an independent organisation under direct delegation of the Principal. The Prefects' main duties include maintaining discipline at school and promoting harmony among students. Prefects' Board runs a committee system directed under the Head Prefect. The board is also responsible for co-ordinating all internal and external functions held by the school. Every year, approximately 70 prefects are divided into five groups, each with their respective group leaders. Prefects have rights to issue warning slips according to the seriousness of the offence.

There are 1–2 development workshops each school year, aiming to enhance the readiness and qualities of prefects. Before summer, there is also a Prefect Training Camp, to prepare Probationary Prefects and the new cabinet of committee members for the challenges they will face in the upcoming school year.

=== Star Studio ===
Wah Yan Star Studio is the college's campus TV team. The team handles all audio-visual matters throughout the school year including assemblies and other school events. The team is also responsible for recording the school events and publishing the video recording or describing the events. The team is also free to record and publish interesting videos/dramas filmed by themselves, much like a TV station. All the videos are published online.

The team is considered a school organization and is not interfered by the Student Association.

=== Houses ===
There are five houses in Wah Yan. Each house has their own colour.

House	Named after	Representative Colour
Berchmans	Saint John Berchmans	Red
Xavier	Saint Francis Xavier	Green
Gonzaga	Saint Aloysius Gonzaga	Yellow
Kostka	Saint Stanislaus Kostka	Blue
Loyola	Saint Ignatius of Loyola	White

Students entering the school are each allocated permanently into one of the four houses, based on which class the student is allocated to. Loyola house members are assigned to class 1W, Kostka house members to 1Y, Gonzaga members to 1C, Xavier members to 1H, and Berchmans to 1K. Students are mixed up into different classes the following year.

== Students' awards ==
Prizes are awarded to the top 2 or 3 students in each form. Separate awards are given to students in both science and arts streams. There are also prizes for students who achieved the best result in each subject in the HKDSE as well as languages.

The Wah Yan College Alumni Association also offer students and graduates scholarships for local or overseas studies.

Since 2011, 3 secondary 5 students are elected Students of the Year annually. One of them will also be selected as the Student Ambassador who will visit an overseas chapter of the Alumni Association together with the representative from Wah Yan College Kowloon during the summer vacation preceding secondary 6. Until 2011, secondary 6 students competed for the award. In 2011, 3 secondary 5 students taking the first HKDSE and 3 secondary 6 students sitting the last HKALE in 2012 were elected students of the year and one from each group was chosen as the Ambassador.

Notable past winners include Godfrey Lam, a Justice of Appeal, and Godwin Leung, a prominent cardiologist in Hong Kong.

To date, 5 students have been awarded the Hong Kong Outstanding Students Awards.

== School symbols ==
=== School song ===
The school song was composed around 1960 by Sr. Carmela Santos, a Sister of St Paul de Chartres (SPC) originally from the Philippines. The lyrics were written by Fr. Patrick McGovern, S.J., who was a teacher in Wah Yan and then a member of the Legislative Council.

=== School seal ===
The seal of the school is divided into four quarters by a cross in red, set on a blue background. The cross symbolises the love of Jesus Christ for mankind, and the blue background symbolises the sea which surrounds Hong Kong. Five stars are set on the badge, one in each quarter and the remaining one is at the centre of the cross. According to the school, the stars symbolise either the ideas of virtue, wisdom, sportsmanship, co-operation and elegance (Chinese: 德、智、體、群、美), or the ideas of benevolence, justice, courtesy, wisdom and faith (Chinese: 仁、義、禮、智、信).

== Attempt to switch to DSS system ==
The school administration spent nearly three years exploring the idea of joining the "Direct Subsidy Scheme", including a rigorous nine-month consultation of stakeholders. This consultation showed strong support for the scheme among parents and alumni while teachers were evenly split on the issue. The Society of Jesus decided to apply for the school to join the scheme in January 2018. The Education Bureau rejected the application.

As a result, the number of secondary 1 places reserved for graduates of the feeder school, Pun U Association Wah Yan Primary School("PUWY"), will remain at 79. The top 79 primary 6 students will be guaranteed places. PUWY Students may also apply for discretionary places but must go through the same procedures as candidates from other schools.

== Notable alumni ==
=== Politics/civil service ===
Name (Year of F5 Graduation)	Chinese Name	Description
Donald Tsang Yam Kuen GBM JP KBE	曾蔭權	Former Chief Executive of Hong Kong Special Administrative Region (SAR)
Anthony Cheung Bing Leung BBS, JP	張炳良	Current Secretary of the Transport and Housing Bureau, the former president of the Hong Kong Institute of Education; member of the Executive Council of Hong Kong
Stephen Lam Sui-lung (1973) JP	林瑞麟	Former Chief Secretary for Administration (formerly Secretary for Constitutional and Mainland Affairs) of Hong Kong
Michael Suen Ming-yeung GBS, JP	孫明揚	Former Secretary for Education of Hong Kong
Joseph Wong Wing Ping	王永平	Former Secretary for Commerce, Industry and Technology of Hong Kong; former Secretary for the Civil Service of Hong Kong
Vincent Fang	方剛	Current Hong Kong Legislative Councillor, Member of the Hong Kong Liberal Party, CEO of Toppy (Hong Kong) Limited
Charles Mok	莫乃光	Current Hong Kong Legislative Councillor (of the Information Technology Functional Constituency) for the Hong Kong Legislative Council.; Chairperson of Internet Society Hong Kong Chapter
Aron Kwok Wai-keung	郭偉強	Current Hong Kong Legislative Councillor for the Labour (constituency) since 2012 Hong Kong legislative election, representing the Hong Kong Federation of Trade Unions
Wu King-cheung	胡經昌	Former Legislative Council member
Wong Sing-wah	黃星華	Retired Government official, former head of Education Department
Wu Wai-yung	鄔維庸	Former representative of Hong Kong in the National People's Congress of the People's Republic of China
Paul Tsui Ka-Cheung	徐家祥	First Chinese Administrative Officer of Hong Kong
Jonathan Choi Chung Hang	蔡宗衡 (2000)	Founding member of Savantas Policy Institute
Andrew Wong Wang Fat JP	黃宏發	The last President of the Legislative Council of Hong Kong during British rule
Chui Kam	徐淦	Former Minister of Broadcasting
Li Fook-shum	李福深(琛)	Former Chairman of Hong Kong Jockey Club; Former chairman of the board of Kowloon Dairy Ltd.
Chau Cham Son, OBE, LLD, JP	周湛燊	Former Deputy Chairman of Hong Kong Jockey Club; former Chief Commissioner of The Scout Association of Hong Kong; Justice of the Peace; Registered Architect; Registered town planner; Authorised Person
Leslie Wah-Leung Chung	鍾華亮	Member of the Hong Kong Volunteers Defence Corps (義勇軍), wounded in action at Lei Yue Mun Fort (鯉魚門炮台), during the Japanese invasion in December 1941. President of the Hong Kong Chinese Civil Servants' Association 香港政府華員會 (1965–68), with contribution to the establishment of equal pay for men and women, including the right for married women to be permanent employees.
Ho Sai Chee	何世柱	Former Legislative Council member
Michael Leung	梁文建	Former Director of Education, Secretary for Transport, Secretary for Education and Manpower, and Commissioner of the ICAC

=== Legal ===
Name (Year of F5 Graduation)	Chinese Name	Description
Mr Justice Patrick Chan GBM NPJ	陳兆愷	Non-Permanent Judge of the Court of Final Appeal of Hong Kong; Life Member of the Hong Kong Bar Association; Recipient of the Grand Bauhinia Medal
Mr Justice Godfrey Lam (1986)	林雲浩	Justice of Appeal of the Court of Appeal of Hong Kong; former President of the Competition Tribunal of Hong Kong; 9As in HKCEE 1986 and 4As in HK A-Level 1988
Mr Justice Barnabas Fung GBS	馮驊	Judge of the Court of First Instance of the High Court of Hong Kong; former Chairman of the Electoral Affairs Commission
Mr Justice Eugene Fung	馮庭碩	Judge of the Court of First Instance of the High Court of Hong Kong
Dr Patrick Yu Shuk Siu	余叔韶	Barrister-at-Law, the first Chinese Crown Counsel and Life Member of the Hong Kong Bar Association
Jason Pow, SC (1979)	鮑永年	Prominent Senior Counsel and a former Recorder (Part Time Judge) of the Court of First Instance of the High Court of Hong Kong
Paul Lam, SC (1985)	林定國	5th Secretary for Justice, prominent Senior Counsel, former Chairman of the Hong Kong Bar Association, former Deputy (Temporary) Judge of the Court of First Instance of the High Court of Hong Kong and former Chairman of the Consumer Council.
Richard Khaw, SC	許偉強	Prominent Senior Counsel (appointment effective from 11 June 2016) and a Recorder (Part Time Judge) of the Court of First Instance of the High Court of Hong Kong

=== Health ===
Name	Chinese Name	Description
Wu Ting Yuk JP	胡定旭	Chairman of the Hong Kong Hospital Authority; former chairman of Ernst & Young Far East and former chairman of Ernst & Young Hong Kong/China
Ho Siu-wai	何兆煒	Former Chief Executive of the Hong Kong Hospital Authority
Tam Kwong Hang	譚廣亨	Pro-Vice-Chancellor of the University of Hong Kong, Chair Professor of Pediatric Surgery, Faculty of Medicine
Kan Yuet Wai	簡悅威	Pioneer of applying molecular biology and genetics into clinical medicine; Fellow of Royal Society; Member of United States National Academy of Sciences; Member of Academia Sinica; Member of Chinese Academy of Sciences; the first Shaw Prize winner
Choa Wing Yip	蔡永業	The founding dean of the Faculty of Medicine of the Chinese University of Hong Kong, former Director of Health; former president of the Mental Health Association of Hong Kong
Thomas Tsang	曾浩輝	Former Controller of the Centre of Health Protection, Department of Health
Leung Pak Yin	梁柏賢	Current Chief Executive of Hospital Authority; Former deputy director of the Department of Health
Chung Sheung Chee	鍾尚志	Former dean of the Faculty of Medicine of the Chinese University of Hong Kong; one of the SARS heroes
Lee Kin-hung	李健鴻	Member of the Council of the University of Hong Kong; former chairman of the Hong Kong Medical Council
David Fang	方津生	Prominent orthopaedic surgeon, The Chairman of the Trust Fund for SARS, Medical Superintendent of St. Paul's Hospital (Hong Kong)
Leung Ping Chung	梁秉中	Founding Chairman of Department of Orthopaedics and Traumatology and Director of National Research Institute of Chinese Medicine, Chinese University of Hong Kong; Chairman of Operation Concern; Deputy to The National People's Congress
Ng Man Lun	吳敏倫	Retired Professor of Psychiatry, University of Hong Kong; one of the most outstanding yet most controversial figures in sex education in Hong Kong

=== Entertainment ===
Name (Year of F5 Graduation)	Chinese Name	Description
Hacken Lee (1985)	李克勤	Singer-songwriter-actor
Joe Nieh (1981)	倪震	Writer, DJ, founder of Yes! magazine, husband of famous actress and singer Vivian Chow
Kevin Cheng	鄭嘉穎	Hong Kong singer-actor
Julian Cheung Chi Lam	張智霖	Hong Kong singer-actor.
Dexter Young	楊天經	Hong Kong singer-actor, son of well-known Hong Kong actress Connie Chan
Jaycee Chan	房祖名	Hong Kong singer-actor, son of prominent kung-fu movie star Jackie Chan
Terence Yin	尹子維	Hong Kong actor-singer, member of the ALIVE Band. Wah Yan Primary
Xiao Liang	蕭亮	Senior broadcaster, actor
Zheng Junli Mian	鄭君綿	Singer, actor
Paul Chun	秦沛	Senior actor
Michael Leung	梁繼璋	Deputy Director of Radio Television Hong Kong, DJ
Ben To	杜浚斌	DJ, singer
Wayne Kwok	郭偉安	DJ
Wai Kee Shun	韋基舜	Prominent sports commentator
	李我(李晚景)	Senior broadcaster, writer
Tam Wai Keun	譚偉權	Actor
Hon Chi Fun	韓志勳	Painter
Tony Sai Kit Woo (1985)	胡世傑	Radio chair
James Sai-sang Yuen	阮世生	Director and scriptwriter
So Yiu-chung	蘇耀宗(細蘇)	DJ of 903, MC, dubber
David Lo	盧大偉	Presenter
Patrick Tam Kar-Ming	譚家明	Film Director; One of the major figures of Hong Kong New Wave; 26th Hong Kong Film Award for Best Director (After This Our Exile (父子)); Associate Professor, The School of Creative Media, City University of Hong Kong
Leon Ko	高世章	Composer for musical theatre and films; Winner of 2001 Richard Rodgers Development Award for Heading East, 2003, 2006, 2009 and 2010 Hong Kong Drama Awards for his four Cantonese musicals The Good Person of Szechwan (四川好人), The Legend of the White Snake (白蛇新傳), Field of Dreams (頂頭鎚) and The Passage Beyond (一屋寶貝), and a Golden Horse Award for Best Original Film Song for Perhaps Love (如果·愛)
Ricky Lam	林立基	Composer for pop music; Winner of CASH 2010 for 第五季
Jimmy O. Yang	歐陽萬成	is a Hong Kong-American actor and stand-up comedian

=== Commerce ===
Name	Chinese Name	Description
Alfred Chuang	莊思浩	CEO of BEA Systems
Sir Gordon Wu	胡應湘	Co-founder (the other co-founder was his father, Wu Chung) of Hopewell Holdings Limited (合和實業有限公司)
Philip Chen	陳南祿	Former CEO of Cathay Pacific
Lawrence Ho	何猷龍	CEO of Melco PBL Entertainment (Macau) Limited. Wah Yan Primary.
Yau Mok Shing	邱木城	Businessmen, Regal, the former chairman of the Tung Wah Group of Hospitals Prescriptions – Hong Kong Securities and Futures Commission, the accounting firm Masilun Marseille senior partner, and vice-president of the Hong Kong Society of Accountants
Edward Lau	劉富强	Chief Financial Officer of New World Development Company Limited, former Chief Financial Officer of Kaisa Group
Fong Hup	方俠	Hong Kong Exchanges and Clearing director of the Hong Kong experienced accountants
Arthur Shek Kang Chuen	石鏡泉	Executive Director of the Hong Kong Economic Times Holding Limited
Kwan Chiu Yin, Robert, MA, JP	關超然	Cheung Kong (Holdings) Independent non-executive director, former chairman of the Ocean Park Corporation, former chairman of Deloitte Touche Tohmatsu – Sociedade de Auditores Deloitte Touche Tohmatsu, former Independent non-executive directors of CK Life Sciences International (Holdings) Corporation, Pak Fah Yeow International Limited, Melco International Development Limited and Shun Tak Holdings Limited, all being listed companies, Justice of the Peace
Wu Po Kong, Patrick, JP	伍步剛	Former Vice Chairperson of Wing Lung Bank Ltd., Vice-chairman of the Hong Kong Institute of Bankers, Honorary Chairman of the Hong Kong Scout Association, as of February 2009 the 17th richest man in Hong Kong according to Forbes magazine, Justice of the Peace
James Loh	羅鼎威	JL Capital Pte Ltd, managing director
	丘銘劍	Parkson Group non-executive director
Patrick C.S. Lo		Co-founder, chairman and chief executive officer of NETGEAR

=== Education ===
Name	Chinese Name	Description
Yu Kwok-Fan	余國藩	Former professor at the University of Chicago
Tong Howell	湯家豪	Emeritus Professor of Statistics at [London School of Economics and Political Science]; Distinguished Professor-at-Large at [University of Electronic Science and Technology of China]; Distinguish Visiting professor at [Tsinghua University, Beijing, China]; Formerly Founding Dean of the Graduate School and Pro-Vice Chancellor at [University of Hong Kong];Founding Chair Professor of Ststistics at [Chinese University of Hong Kong]; formerly Director of Institute of Mathematics and Statistics at [University of Kent, UK]
Leung Siu-Tang, Tim		University of Washington Professor of Applied Mathematics; Director of the UW Computational Finance & Risk Management program; chair for the Institute for Operations Research and the Management Sciences (INFORMS) Finance Section
Wong Chin-wa	黃展華	Teacher, Creator of the Chinese Opera in English
Lui Tai-Lok	呂大樂	Hong Kong University professor of sociology, columnist
Ng Chun-Hung	吳俊雄	Hong Kong University associate professor of sociology
Lee Yeuk-Siu	李煜紹	Hong Kong University associate professor of geography
Dr. John K Tan	陳岡	Former Chief Curriculum Development Officer (Liberal Studies/ Cross-curricular Studies) of Education Bureau; Former Principal of Valtorta College; Editor of WYHEUR; Former Principal of Wah Yan College, Kowloon; Current Principal of Pun U Association Wah Yan Primary School; Founding Headmaster-designate of Harrow Hong Kong Children School Shenzhen Qianhai

=== Religion ===
Name	Chinese Name	Description
Rev. Fr. Stephen Chow, S.J.	周守仁	Bishop of Hong Kong; Roman Catholic Jesuit priest; Honorary Assistant Professor at the University of Hong Kong's Faculty of Education; former Supervisor of Wah Yan College, Hong Kong and Kowloon
Dominic Tang Yee-ming, S.J.	鄧以明	Last Roman Catholic Archbishop of Canton, spent twenty-two years in jail for his loyalty to the Roman Catholic Church

=== Others ===
Name	Chinese Name	Description
Patrick Chan Nim-Tak JP	陳念德	Former Director of General Grades of Hong Kong
Ng Yook Man	吳煜民	Writer
Lai Wai Chung	黎偉聰	Writer, university lecturer
Johnny Li Khai-kam	李啟淦	Swimmer representing Hong Kong at the 1984 and 1988 Summer Olympics
Charles Mok	莫乃光	Current Hong Kong Legislative Councillor (of the Information Technology Functional Constituency) for the Hong Kong Legislative Council.; Chairperson of Internet Society Hong Kong Chapter
Eric Wong	黃家賜	Former Program Director of the Public Safety Program for the New York City Police Department
Yip Kam-haw Paul	葉金豪	Winner of the HK$250,000 cash prize in ATV's TV game show Who Wants to Be a Millionaire?, Vocab Master
Chan Sunny I.	陳長謙	Hoag Professor Emeritus of California Institute of Technology; Former Vice-president of Academia Sinica

LUI Ting Ming, Francis 雷鼎鳴 Professor Emeritus of HKUST, Columnist

== Bombs found ==
Two bombs, home-made IEDs, were found by a janitor and deactivated by police at the school on 9 December 2019, probably linked to the 2019–20 Hong Kong protests. They contained about 22 pounds (10.0 kg) of two different types of explosives. One 20-year-old student was arrested in connection with the incident and charged with possession of firearms and public order offences. The suspect was released on bail pending trial. He attempted to flee to Taiwan but was later caught by the Chinese Public Security officers in the South China Sea along with 11 other people prosecuted by Hong Kong authorities for offences under the Hong Kong National Security Law.

== Footnotes ==
- 香港華仁書院申請轉直資被拒

== See also ==
- Wah Yan College, Kowloon
- Wah Yan College Cats
- Wah Yan One Family Foundation
- Education in Hong Kong
- List of buildings and structures in Hong Kong
- List of schools in Hong Kong
- List of Jesuit sites
