= Michael Ying =

Hong Kong businessman

- 邢李㷧
- Born: Ying Lee Yuen; December 1949 (age 75); British Hong Kong
- Spouses: Flora Cheong-Leen (m. 1986; div. 1988) Brigitte Lin (m. 1994)
- Children: 3

Michael Ying Lee Yuen (Chinese: 邢李㷧; pinyin: Xíng Lǐyuán; born December 1949) is a Hong Kong billionaire businessman and philanthropist. Ying is the former chairman and chief executive officer of Esprit Holdings Limited, and remains the largest individual shareholder, with a 15% stake. Ying steadily reduced his majority stake in recent years, pocketing more than $2 billion. Ying has donated to various charitable organizations, and started the Yanai Foundation in 2006 to benefit medical and educational related initiatives.

== Early life ==
Ying was born in Hong Kong. His father and his family had originated from Wenchang, Hainan, China. He began his career as a laborer in the garment factory, and later dealt with clients such as Esprit. Esprit later hired Ying as its sole sourcing agent in 1970. Esprit Far East Group began operating in the 1970s when its founders Susie and Douglas Tompkins began doing business with Ying.

== Career ==
In the mid 2000s, Esprit Holdings Limited generated worldwide sales of around EUR 3.25 billion (as of 30 June 2008). Esprit operates in more than 770 retail stores worldwide and distributes products to more than 15,150 wholesale locations around the globe. Esprit has more than 1.1 million square meters of retail space in 40 countries.

The clothier was started in 1968, when Susie and Doug Tompkins sold clothes out of the back of a station wagon in San Francisco. Esprit Far East Group began operating in the 1970s when the couple met Ying.

During Ying's tenure, Esprit's sales grew 30-fold to HK$23.3 billion in the year ended June 2006 from HK$769.7 million in 1993, according to data compiled by Bloomberg. Ying helped oversee Esprit's global expansion and a sales surge during a 13-year tenure as chairman that ended in 2006.

In January 2019, Forbes estimated his net worth at US$2.4 billion.

== Personal life ==
Ying has now dedicated his time to his family, Yanai Foundation, and maintains a low profile in Asia. Ying enjoys the outdoors, diving, golf and exploration.

In 1986, Ying married Flora Cheong-Leen, a ballerina turned entrepreneur, and they have one child Claudine Ying (born 1987). They divorced in 1988.

In 1995, Ying married former actress Brigitte Lin and they have two daughters together: Ying Oi Lum (born 1996) and Ying Yin Oi (born 2001). They live in Hong Kong.
