= Ho Kai-ming =

Ho Kai-ming may refer to:

- Ho Kai-ming (FTU), Hong Kong politician, member of HKFTU
- Kalvin Ho Kai-ming (ADPL), Hong Kong politician, member of ADPL
- Kai-Ming Ho, American physicist
