= Wah Yan Dramatic Society =

Wah Yan Dramatic Society is an organisation in Hong Kong which performs Cantonese opera using English, also called "Cantonese Opera in English".

== History ==
Wah Yan Dramatic Society was established in 1947 by Wong Chin Wah, an alumnus from Wah Yan College, in order to allow foreigners to appreciate the culture of Cantonese opera. It started with an attempt by Father Sheridan to fit English lyrics into Cantonese operas. The attempt was welcomed, so Wong, Sheridan and some other alumni established the Wah Yan Dramatic Society.

Wong Chin Wah wrote English lyrics for a total of 36 Cantonese Operas, including "A Lizard is No Dragon", "The Fighting Bride", "Three Times Engaged", and "A Tale of Two Kingdoms". Notable people such as Donald Tsang, Dominic Wong, Michael Suen, and John Chan have performed with the society.

In February 2007 the Society gave a performance in the Hong Kong Cultural Centre to celebrate the 60th anniversary of the society, and also to raise funds for its SDP project and Tung Wah Group of Hospitals, with Donald Tsang and Bak Sheut Sin as chief patrons. During the performance, an English version of the noted mandarin song "The Moon Represents My Heart" was sung by Stanley Ho.
