= Quality Education Fund =

Fund in Hong Kong set up for promoting education reform

- Chinese: 優質教育基金

Fund overview
- Formed: 2 January 1998; 28 years ago
- Jurisdiction: Government of Hong Kong
- Headquarters: 403/F, Cityplaza Phase 3, 14 Tai Koo Wan Rd, Quarry Bay
- Website: qef.org.hk

The Quality Education Fund (Chinese: 優質教育基金; 2 January 1998 – ) is a fund in Hong Kong set up for promoting education reform. It was suggested by Tung Chee-hwa, former Chief Executive of Hong Kong, in his first policy address in October 1997. It is used for funding various quality education programmes in Hong Kong.

After the fund was set up, it obtained five billion HKD from the Government of Hong Kong to support its long-term operation. Initially, the full amount of requested funding will be allocated to the applicants, but now the fund is a matching fund.

== Statistics ==
In the first eight rounds of allocation, 15,089 applications were received. 5,802 applications were successful, with a total of thirty-one billion HKD allocated. Over 90% of primary, secondary, and special schools had applied.

== Criticism ==
On 15 October 2001, Audit Commission published a report named "Management of the Quality Education Fund". It provided some criticisms and suggestions.

Initially, there were no limits on the amount of applications from an applicant. Some schools applied many times to implement many plans so it increased the workload on teachers. Although applying is voluntary, some people saw "successful applications" as an indicator of performance of schools, causing many schools to apply to catch up. During an interview, Fanny Law, former permanent secretary of Education and Manpower Bureau, said, "Some schools seem to stipulate that every teacher needs to write some suggestion, creating intangible pressure in the process." There were also criticisms that the fund is effectively involuntary.

The education industry has also complained that the procedures were complicated and the requirements were too high. On 25 May 2018, The chairperson of the fund, Xu Lian'an, said that the fund did not provide a form for applications and schools had to write their own plan outline, so the fund would simplify procedures by designing an application form for schools to fill in. Successful applications are uploaded to the fund's website (Cyber Resource Centre) for others to reference. He also said that after simplifying procedures, time it takes to process applications involving amounts over 600 thousand HKD can be shortened from over six months to three months only.

== Significant items ==
- Hong Kong Education City
- Sign Assisted Instruction Programme
