= Dominic Chan =

The Very Reverend Dominic Chan Chi-ming
- Vicar General Emeritus of the Diocese of Hong Kong
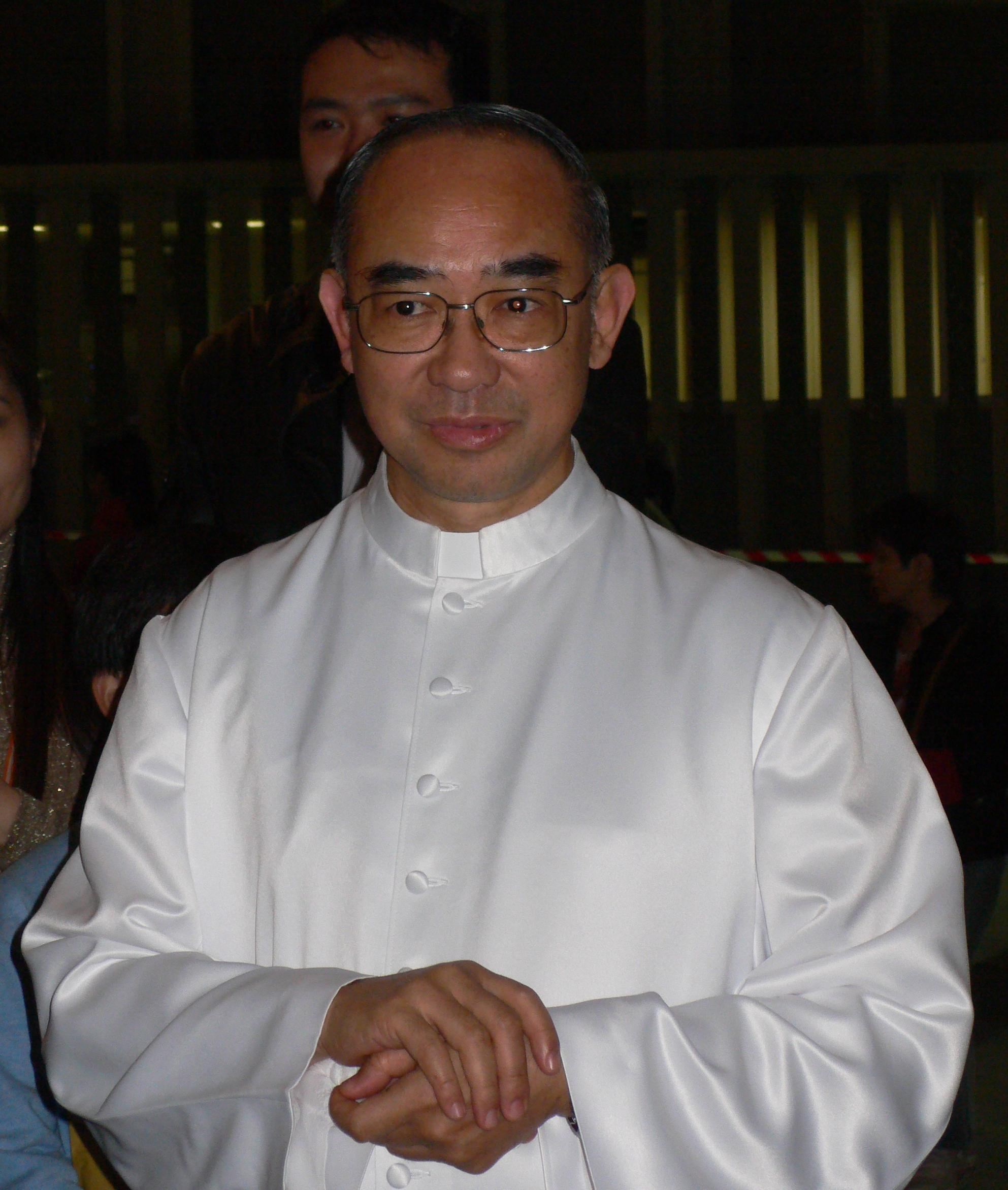
- Church: Roman Catholic Church
- See: Hong Kong
- Appointed: 8 December 1992
- Term ended: 3 January 2019
- Other post: Parish priest of the Cathedral of the Immaculate Conception (2000–present)

Orders
- Ordination: 1979 by John Baptist Wu

Personal details
- Born: 1952 (age 73–74) Yim Tin Tsai, Sai Kung, British Hong Kong
- Denomination: Roman Catholic
- Residence: Hong Kong
- Education: Holy Spirit Seminary; Pontifical Urbaniana University; Pontifical University of Saint Thomas Aquinas

Styles of Dominic Chan Chi-ming
- Reference style: The Very Reverend
- Informal style: Father

Ordination history of Dominic Chan
History
Priestly ordination
- Ordained by: John Baptist Wu (Hong Kong)
- Date: 1979
- Place: Hong Kong

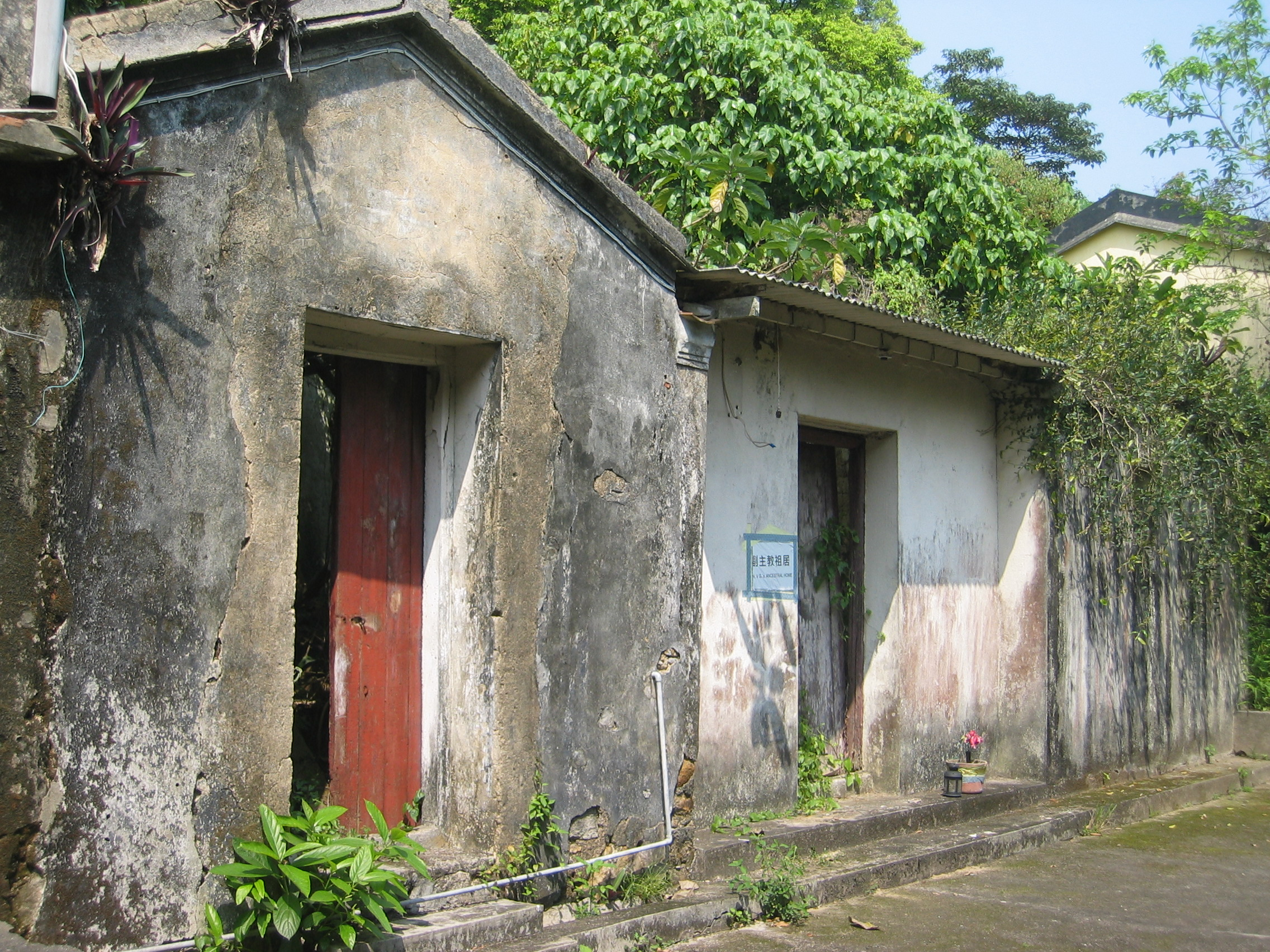
Chan's former house in Yim Tin Tsai, Sai Kung

Dominic Chan Chi-ming (陳志明; born 1952) is the former vicar general of the Roman Catholic Diocese of Hong Kong. He also serves as parish priest of the city's Cathedral of the Immaculate Conception.

== Early life ==
Chan was born in Yim Tin Tsai, Sai Kung District, New Territories, Hong Kong in 1952. Chan is of Hakka ancestry. He was ordained priest by Cardinal John Baptist Wu in 1979.

Chan later led funds to restore a chapel on Yim Tin Tsai Island in compliance with a UNESCO restoration project in 2016.

== Vicar General ==
Chan served as vicar general of the Diocese of Hong Kong from December 1992 until January 2019. He was chosen together with John Tong Hon, and served with him until the latter's appointment as coadjutor bishop of Hong Kong in 2008. Chan has also served as vicar general alongside Michael Yeung (from 2009 until 2016, when Yeung was appointed coadjutor bishop), Pierre Lam (2009–2014), Joseph Ha (2014–2019), Peter Choy, and Benedict Lam (both 2017–2019). The office of vicar general became vacant upon the death of Michael Yeung on 3 January 2019.

In this office, Chan serves as Chairperson of the Diocesan Pastoral Commission for Marriage and the Family, the Diocesan Commission for Laity Formation, the Committee for Promoting the Cardinal's Pastoral Exhortation, the Diocesan Board of Catholic Cemeteries and the Diocesan Committee for the Permanent Diaconate. He is also an Ex-officio Member of the Council of Priests, the Diocesan Personnel Commission, the Hong Kong Catholic Board of Education, the Hong Kong Catholic Education Development Committee, the Central Management Committee for Diocesan Schools and the Diocesan Building and Development Commission. While Chan has been the Vicar General, Hong Kong has recruited more married men to become deacons (Hong Kong was the first Catholic diocese in Asia to ordain married men as deacons). Chan visited former Hong Kong leader Donald Tsang while Tsang's trials were ongoing.

In 2017, Chan presided over the ceremonies in which the Our Lady of Fatima Statue passed through the territory on its first stop en route to Portugal to celebrate the centennial of the Marian apparition.

== Parish priest ==
Chan has been the Parish Priest of the Hong Kong Catholic Cathedral of the Immaculate Conception since 2000.

== View on the elevation of Bishop Zen ==
On 13 February 2006, Chan expressed his view on the then possibility of the elevation of Joseph Zen, the Bishop of Hong Kong, to Cardinal. He said although he was still waiting for a formal announcement, he expected Zen to be elevated to cardinal in the next consistory. He believed that his elevation will show how important the Holy See values the church in China, and that it would be an honour to have a cardinal once again to head the diocese. Zen eventually became a Cardinal.

== See also ==
- Catholic Diocese of Hong Kong

Catholic Church titles
Preceded by Gabriel Lam; John Baptist Tsang	Vicar General of the Diocese of Hong Kong; 1992–2019; With: John Tong Hon (1992–2008); Michael Yeung (2009–2016); Pierre Lam (2009–2014); Joseph Ha (2014–2019); Peter Choy (2017–2019); Benedict Lam (2017–2019)	Vacant
Unknown	Parish priest of the Cathedral of the Immaculate Conception; 2000–present	Incumbent
