= Michael Yeung =

Bishop of Hong Kong from 2017 to 2019

His Excellency, The Most Reverend Michael Yeung Ming-cheung
- Bishop of Hong Kong
- Church: Roman Catholic Church
- See: Hong Kong
- Appointed: 1 August 2017
- Installed: 5 August 2017
- Term ended: 3 January 2019
- Predecessor: John Tong Hon
- Successor: Stephen Chow
- Previous posts: Vicar General of the Diocese of Hong Kong (2009–2016); Auxiliary Bishop of Hong Kong (2014–16); Titular Bishop of Mons in Numidia (2014–16); Coadjutor Bishop of Hong Kong (2016–17)

Orders
- Ordination: 10 June 1978 by John Baptist Wu
- Consecration: 30 August 2014 by John Tong Hon

Personal details
- Born: Michael Yeung Ming-cheung; 1 December 1945 Shanghai, China
- Died: 3 January 2019 (aged 73) Canossa Hospital, Mid-Levels, Hong Kong
- Buried: St. Michael's Catholic Cemetery, Happy Valley
- Denomination: Roman Catholic
- Residence: Hong Kong
- Education: Pontifical Urban University; Syracuse University; Harvard University
- Motto: Surgite Eamus Hinc 起行伊始 (English: Arise, let us go forth from here)
- Coat of arms: Michael Yeung Ming-cheung's coat of arms

Ordination history
History
Priestly ordination
- Ordained by: John Baptist Wu (Hong Kong)
Episcopal consecration
- Principal consecrator: John Tong Hon (Hong Kong)
- Co-consecrators: Joseph Zen (Hong Kong em.); Savio Hon (Sec. Sacr. Cong. Prop. Fide)

Chinese name
- Traditional Chinese: 楊鳴章
- Simplified Chinese: 杨鸣章
- Jyutping: joeng6 ming6 zoeng1
Transcriptions
Standard Mandarin
- Hanyu Pinyin: Yáng Míngzhāng
Yue: Cantonese
- Jyutping: joeng6 ming6 zoeng1

Styles of Michael Yeung Ming-cheung
- Reference style: His Excellency; The Most Reverend
- Spoken style: Your Excellency
- Religious style: Bishop

Michael Yeung Ming-cheung (Chinese: 楊鳴章; 1 December 1945 – 3 January 2019) was the eighth Roman Catholic bishop of Hong Kong. He was consecrated on 30 August 2014.

== Early life ==
Yeung Ming-cheung was born in Shanghai in 1945. He completed his primary and secondary schooling and began working for an import-export company in Hong Kong. In 1972 at the age of 26 he entered the Pontifical Urban University to study theology and philosophy and graduated in 1978.

== Priest ==
He was ordained a priest for the diocese of Hong Kong on 10 June 1978. After his ordination he took a variety of pastoral and administrative roles. From 1978 to 1980 he was vicar in Ha Kwai Chung District, New Territories; from 1980 to 1982 he earned an MA in social communications from Syracuse University in the United States. In 1982 he returned to Hong Kong and was appointed director of the office of Social Communications for the diocese. He held this post until 1986. He was then appointed parish priest of Our Lady of Lourdes parish, where he served until 1989 when he was appointed chaplain at Yu C.K. Memorial College. He returned to the United States to study at Harvard University where in 1990 he earned a Master's in Education (Ed.M.). He returned to Hong Kong in 1990 and held the post of director of the office of education until 2013. He was the head of Caritas Hong Kong and was appointed vicar general of the diocese in 2009. He was later appointed a member of the Pontifical Council Cor Unum.

== Bishop ==
On 11 July 2014, Pope Francis appointed him Titular Bishop of Mons in Numidia and named him one of three Auxiliary Bishops of Hong Kong along with Joseph Ha Chi-shing, O.F.M. and Stephen Lee Bun-sang. Consecrated on 30 August 2014, Yeung was appointed the coadjutor bishop of the diocese on 13 November 2016, and succeeded Cardinal John Tong Hon as the Bishop of Hong Kong on 1 August 2017. On 27 June 2018, AsiaNews reported that Yeung had tendered his resignation to Pope Francis in order to dedicate himself to Caritas. Yeung said he had only suggested that he would like to work for Caritas when he retired from his Hong Kong position. He received two honorary doctorates: one in Social Science from the Open University of Hong Kong, and another one from the Australian Catholic University.

== Illness and death ==
Yeung reportedly tripped over his alb and injured himself when stepping upstairs before celebrating a Mass in December 2018. He made his last public appearance when he celebrated the Christmas Eve Midnight Mass at the Cathedral of the Immaculate Conception the same month. Beginning 27 December 2018, Yeung underwent treatment for liver failure brought on by cirrhosis at the Canossa Hospital. He died at 1:30pm (Hong Kong time) on 3 January 2019 from the illness. Following Yeung's death, Pope Francis appointed Cardinal Tong apostolic administrator to lead the diocese until an appointment of a new bishop. Stephen Chow was appointed Bishop of Hong Kong on 17 May 2021 and was consecrated bishop and installed on 4 December 2021.

== Controversies ==
Throughout his career as a Catholic clergyman, Yeung was at the center of various controversies. He was criticised for comparing participants of the 2014 Hong Kong protests, as well as homosexuals, to those who use drugs.

Yeung's close ties with Carrie Lam, the 5th Chief Executive of Hong Kong, were also a source of controversy. Yeung said Lam is a Catholic, and he had good ties with her for years. Yeung also said he knew her on a professional level, during her time as the Director of the Social Welfare Department, and that he had no reasons to reject her, and sever ties. Yeung's ties with the rich and powerful in Hong Kong has also been a source of criticism.

Yeung was also criticised for allegedly defending mainland Chinese authorities during a news conference over controversies concerning the removal of crucifixes from church buildings or demolition of churches. He also said that, since China has regulations on religion, he will respect their rules.

Catholic Church titles
Preceded by John Tong Hon	Vicar General of the Diocese of Hong Kong; 2009–2016; With: Dominic Chan (2009–2016); Pierre Lam (2009–2014); Joseph Ha (2014–2016)	Succeeded by Peter Choy; Benedict Lam
Vacant Title last held by John Tong Hon	Auxiliary Bishop of Hong Kong; 2014–2016; With: Stephen Lee (2014–2016); Joseph Ha (2014–2016)	Succeeded by —
Vacant Title last held by John Tong Hon	Coadjutor Bishop of Hong Kong; 2016–2017	Vacant
Preceded by John Tong Hon	Bishop of Hong Kong; 2017–2019	Succeeded by Stephen Chow
Preceded by Wojciech Polak	— TITULAR — Bishop of Mons in Numidia; 2014–2016	Succeeded by Geovane Luís da Silva
