= Stephen Chow (cardinal) =

Bishop of Hong Kong since 2021

His Eminence Stephen Chow Sau-yan S.J.
- Cardinal, Bishop of Hong Kong
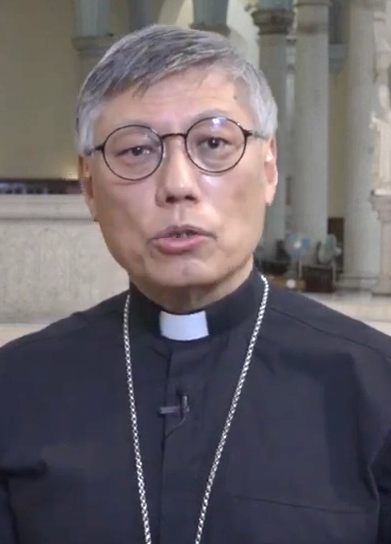
- Chow in 2022
- Church: Roman Catholic Church
- See: Hong Kong
- Appointed: 17 May 2021
- Installed: 4 December 2021
- Predecessor: Michael Yeung
- Other posts: Cardinal-Priest of San Giovanni Battista de La Salle (2023–present); Member of Dicastery for Interreligious Dialogue (2023–present)
- Previous post: Provincial superior of the Chinese Province of the Society of Jesus (2018–2021)

Orders
- Ordination: 16 July 1994 by John Baptist Wu
- Consecration: 4 December 2021 by John Tong Hon
- Created cardinal: 30 September 2023 by Pope Francis
- Rank: Cardinal-Priest

Personal details
- Born: 7 August 1959 (age 67) British Hong Kong
- Denomination: Roman Catholic
- Residence: Hong Kong
- Education: University of Minnesota; Milltown Institute of Theology and Philosophy; Loyola University Chicago; Harvard University
- Motto: Ad Majorem Dei Gloriam 愈顯主榮 (English: For the Greater Glory of God)
- Coat of arms: Stephen Chow Sau-yan's coat of arms

Ordination history
History
Priestly ordination
- Ordained by: John Baptist Wu (Hong Kong)
- Date: 16 July 1994
- Place: Cathedral of the Immaculate Conception, British Hong Kong
Episcopal consecration
- Principal consecrator: John Tong Hon (Hong Kong em.)
- Co-consecrators: Joseph Zen (Hong Kong em.); Joseph Ha (Hong Kong aux.)
- Date: 4 December 2021
- Place: Cathedral of the Immaculate Conception, Hong Kong
Cardinalate
- Elevated by: Pope Francis
- Date: 30 September 2023

Chinese name
- Chinese: 周守仁
Transcriptions
Standard Mandarin
- Hanyu Pinyin: Zhōu Shǒurén
Yue: Cantonese
- Jyutping: Zau^{1} Sau^{2} Jan^{4}
- IPA: [tsɐw˥ sɐw˧˥ yɐn˩]

Styles of Stephen Chow Sau-yan
- Reference style: His Eminence
- Spoken style: Your Eminence
- Religious style: Cardinal
- Informal style: Cardinal

Stephen Chow Sau-yan, S.J. (Chinese: 周守仁, born 7 August 1959) is a Hong Kong prelate of the Catholic Church who has served as Bishop of Hong Kong since 2021. He was the provincial superior of the Chinese Province of the Society of Jesus from 2018 to 2021. Chow was elevated to cardinal by Pope Francis on 30 September 2023.

== Early life ==
Chow was born in British Hong Kong on 7 August 1959. He studied psychology and philosophy at the University of Minnesota, obtaining a bachelor's degree and a master's degree in Educational Psychology. He joined the Society of Jesus in 1984, completing his noviceship in 1986. He studied at the Milltown Institute of Theology and Philosophy in Dublin, earning a licenciate in philosophy in 1988. He then returned to Hong Kong and taught at Wah Yan College, Kowloon for two years. Starting in 1990, he studied theology at the Holy Spirit Seminary in Hong Kong. On 16 July 1994, Chow was ordained a priest in the Cathedral of the Immaculate Conception by John Baptist Wu, Bishop of Hong Kong. He undertook postgraduate studies at Loyola University Chicago, receiving a master's degree in organizational development in 1995.

== Presbyteral ministry ==
Chow's first pastoral assignment was at Wah Yan Kowloon and Hong Kong, where he was chaplain, teacher, and school manager from 1996 to 2000. He began doctoral studies at Harvard University in 2000 and received his Doctor of Education degree six years later. His thesis was titled "Understanding Moral Culture in Hong Kong Secondary Schools: Relationships among Moral Norm, Moral Culture, Academic Achievement Motivation, and Empathy". He made his final vows on 17 April 2007.

Until 2021, Chow served as supervisor of both Wah Yan colleges in Kowloon and Hong Kong Island. He was an honorary assistant professor at the University of Hong Kong from 2007 to 2014, as well as a part-time professor of psychology at Holy Spirit Seminary. He participated at the Jesuits' 36th General Congregation in October 2016. Chow succeeded John Lee Hua as provincial superior of the Chinese Province of the Society of Jesus on 1 January 2018.

== Episcopal ministry ==
Chow was appointed Bishop of Hong Kong on 17 May 2021. The see had been vacant since 3 January 2019, when Michael Yeung died after less than two years in office. His appointment was described as a surprise by the Jesuit magazine America given that he had not been mentioned as one of the likely candidates for the post. The Union of Catholic Asian News had mentioned in January 2019 that two of the candidates were Jesuits, without naming them. Chow later revealed that he initially declined the bishop's title in December 2020 because he thought the post should go to a member of the secular clergy. He relented after receiving a handwritten letter from Pope Francis. He was consecrated on 4 December 2021.

During his first Chrism Mass as bishop in April 2022, Chow expressed support for ordained female priests, saying in a homily,

"I turn to English, just to address our ordained brothers, and I hope one day maybe ordained sister[s] too.”

In April 2023, Chow visited the archdiocese of Beijing. He met with Archbishop Joseph Li Shan, visited several churches and the Zhalan Cemetery that holds the tombstone of Matteo Ricci. During the visit he told the press:

"Everyone would like to see their own country do well, no one wants it to do badly. I think it’s everyone’s duty to be patriotic if you're a citizen in Hong Kong or mainland China."

His was the first Beijing visit by a Hong Kong bishop since 1985. After returning to Hong Kong, he elaborated further on his call to patriotism. He said:

"Like many Hongkongers, I grew up during the colonial era when national sentiment and identity could hardly be part of our consciousness. It can be said that our blood does not carry any love for the nation...It requires extra effort to alter this mentality and it is even more difficult to do so after experiencing the social and political changes over the past decade...I believe both the central and local governments are also aware of this. We really need guidance from the Holy Spirit so we can love our country and our churches at the same time."

He also called for dialogue with the government and that people should help the government improve for the sake of the country. In May 2023, Chow commented that he did not believe the Vatican-China deal was 'dead', despite disputes regarding Beijing's unilateral installation of bishops. He also said that

"The fate of the church in China is inseparable from that of the country, as all the people of the church are also Chinese."

On 9 July 2023, Pope Francis announced he plans to make him a cardinal at a consistory scheduled for 30 September. Chow commented on the appointment:

I think the appointment as cardinal will strengthen the role of the Catholic Church in Hong Kong as a bridging church, to promote exchanges and interactions between mainland China and the universal Church.

At the aforementioned consistory, he was made Cardinal-Priest of San Giovanni Battista de La Salle. He was subsequently appointed a member of the Dicastery for Interreligious Dialogue. He participated as a cardinal elector in the 2025 papal conclave that elected Pope Leo XIV.

He has been praised by state media in China as a 'bridge-builder'.

Catholic Church titles
Preceded by John Lee Hua	Provincial Superior of the Chinese Province of the Society of Jesus; 2018–2021	Succeeded by Stephen Tong
Preceded by Michael Yeung	Bishop of Hong Kong; 2021–present	Incumbent
New creation	Cardinal-Priest of San Giovanni Battista de La Salle; 2023–present	Incumbent
