= Gabriel Lam (priest) =

Former Vicar General of Hong Kong

The Right Reverend Gabriel Lam Cheuk-wai
- Roman Catholic priest
- Church: Roman Catholic Church
- See: Hong Kong
- Previous posts: Vicar General of the Diocese of Hong Kong (1974–1975, 1975–1992); Vicar Capitular of the Diocese of Hong Kong (1974–1975)

Orders
- Ordination: 1967

Personal details
- Born: 13 November 1933 (age 93)
- Denomination: Roman Catholic
- Residence: Hong Kong
- Education: Holy Spirit Seminary

Styles of Gabriel Lam Cheuk-wai
- Reference style: The Right Reverend
- Informal style: Father

Ordination history of Gabriel Lam
History
Priestly ordination
- Date: 1967
- Place: Hong Kong

Gabriel Lam Cheuk-wai (traditional Chinese: 林焯煒; simplified Chinese: 林焯炜, born 13 November 1933) is a Roman Catholic priest for the Diocese of Hong Kong. He was the Vicar Capitular of that diocese from 23 July 1974 to 25 July 1975. After that, he remained as the vicar general until 1992. As a former Vicar Capitular and Vicar General, he is entitled to be styled as "The Right Reverend".

== Biography ==
Lam was among 200 guests from Hong Kong to be invited by the Chinese government for the 35th anniversary of the People's Republic of China in 1984. Thus, he reportedly became the first Catholic official from Hong Kong to be invited by to mainland China since the establishment of the PRC in 1949. The invitation was originally intended to be for Cardinal John Baptist Wu, the bishop of Hong Kong, but due to his prior commitments in Europe, the diocese recommended Lam as the alternative.

Lam served as sole vicar general from 1975 onwards, and alongside John Baptist Tsang (曾慶文) starting in 1985. Both Lam and Tsang ceased to be vicars general in 1992, when they were assigned to the newly formed positions of Episcopal Vicar for Religious and Episcopal Vicar for Social Services, respectively. They were succeeded by Dominic Chan and John Tong.

== See also ==
- Catholic Diocese of Hong Kong

Catholic Church titles
Vacant Title last held by Peter Lei	Vicar Capitular of the Diocese of Hong Kong; 1974–1975	Vacant
Unknown	Vicar General of the Diocese of Hong Kong; 1974–1992; With: John Baptist Tsang (1985–1992)	Succeeded by Dominic Chan; John Tong Hon
