= Joseph Ha =

His Excellency, The Most Reverend Joseph Ha Chi-shing OFM
- Titular Bishop of Simitthus; Auxiliary Bishop of Hong Kong
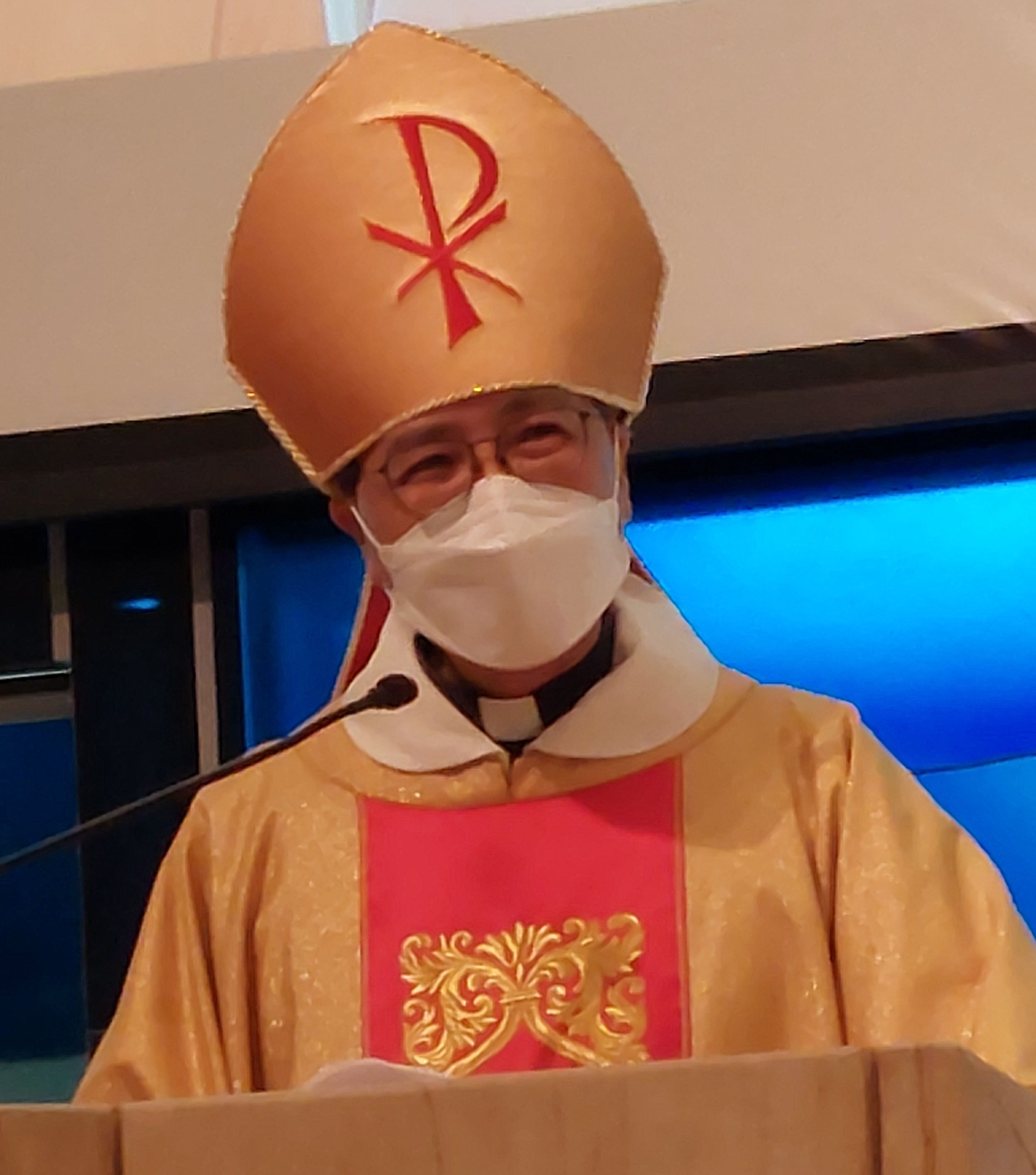
- Ha in 2021
- Church: Catholic Church
- Diocese: Hong Kong
- See: Hong Kong
- Appointed: 11 July 2014

Orders
- Ordination: 9 September 1990 by John Baptist Wu
- Consecration: 30 August 2014 by John Tong Hon

Personal details
- Born: 4 March 1959 (age 67) British Hong Kong
- Denomination: Roman Catholicism
- Residence: Hong Kong
- Education: Pontifical Urban University; Pontifical University Antonianum; Saint Louis University
- Motto: Pax et bonum (English: Peace and goodness)
- Coat of arms: Joseph Ha Chi-shing's coat of arms

Styles of Joseph Ha Chi-shing
- Reference style: His Excellency; The Most Reverend
- Spoken style: Your Excellency
- Religious style: Bishop

Ordination history of Joseph Ha
History
Priestly ordination
- Ordained by: John Baptist Wu (Hong Kong)
Episcopal consecration
- Principal consecrator: John Tong Hon (Hong Kong)
- Co-consecrators: Joseph Zen (Hong Kong em.); Savio Hon (Sec. Sacr. Cong. Prop. Fide)

Joseph Ha Chi-shing, O.F.M. (Chinese: 夏志誠, born 4 March 1959), is a Roman Catholic bishop and currently the auxiliary bishop of Hong Kong.

== Biography ==
Ha was born in Hong Kong, and started learning Catholic catechism and was then baptised during his study in secondary school. After his graduation, he worked in the field of banking before finding his vocational calling after a pilgrimage to a Marian shrine. He joined the Order of Friars Minor in 1984, and received basic religious formation in Taiwan.

He was ordained as a priest on 9 September 1990 at the Cathedral of the Immaculate Conception, Hong Kong, from the hands of Cardinal John Baptist Wu, the Bishop of Hong Kong at the time. Since his ordination, he has served as parish priest in St. Bonaventure Parish, Our Lady Queen of Angels Parish, and as Parochial Administrator of St. Francis's Parish. He was also appointed as supervisor of St. Bonaventure College & High School, St. Bonaventure Catholic Primary School and Tsz Wan Shan St. Bonaventure Catholic Primary School. He has also been a member of the Hong Kong Catholic Board of Education since 2011. He has also been elected twice as the president of the Franciscan Foundation in Hong Kong (in 1999 and 2010 respectively).

Ha is a theologian and an expert in spirituality, who holds a master's degree in spirituality from Pontifical University Antonianum.

On 11 July 2014, Ha was appointed as one of the three auxiliary bishops of Hong Kong by Pope Francis, holding the titular see of Simitthu, along with Michael Yeung Ming-cheung and Stephen Lee Bun-sang. They were consecrated bishops on 30 August 2014, with Cardinal John Tong Hon, Bishop of Hong Kong, as their principal consecrator.

With Lee's appointment as Bishop of Macau in January 2016 and Yeung's promotion to coadjutor and then bishop of Hong Kong, Ha remains the sole auxiliary.

In September 2019 during the Hong Kong protests he called for people to pray and fast for peace, while speaking up against injustice and corruption, “It's been a tradition for us to fast on Fridays. However, this tradition somehow was abolished. With fasting and prayers, we hope that we can help ourselves to strengthen our mind and soul to fight evil thoughts. Then, we would be in a better position to help fellow Hongkongers.”

== Coat of arms ==
The coat of arms of Bishop Ha is unique in two ways: it adopted a simpler design of tassel cord loop, symbolizing simplicity, straightforwardness and sincerity; and it uses a Franciscan cross, instead of the more common Latin Cross, behind the shield.

His episcopal motto is Pax et Bonum, the greeting of St. Francis of Assisi, meaning peace and goodness.

Catholic Church titles
Vacant Title last held by John Tong Hon	Auxiliary Bishop of Hong Kong; 2014–present With: Michael Yeung (2014–2016); Stephen Lee (2014–2016)	Incumbent
Preceded by Meron Mazur	— TITULAR — Bishop of Simitthu; 2014–present	Incumbent
