= Santa Maria Madre del Redentore a Tor Bella Monaca =

- Church of Saint Mary Mother of the Redeemer in Tor Bella Monaca
- Chiesa di Santa Maria Madre del Redentore
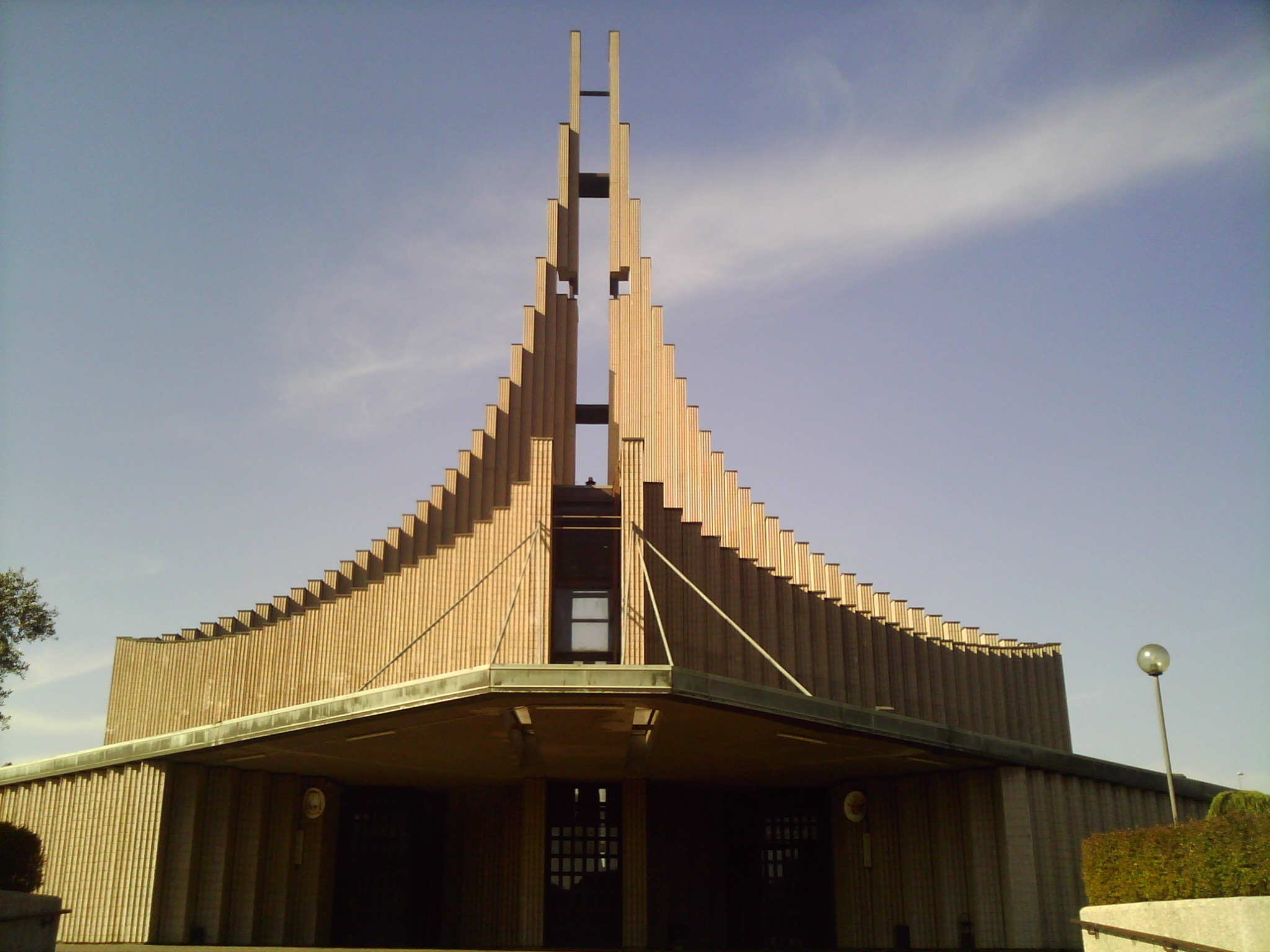
- Facade
- Click on the map for a fullscreen view
- 41°52′14″N 12°37′57″E
- Location: Viale Duilio Cambellotti 18, Rome
- Country: Italy
- Language: Italian
- Denomination: Catholic
- Tradition: Roman Rite
- Website: smmr.it

History
- Status: titular church
- Founded: 1985
- Dedication: Mary, mother of Jesus

Architecture
- Architectural type: Modernist
- Completed: 1987

Administration
- Diocese: Rome

The Church of Santa Maria Madre del Redentore a Tor Bella Monaca is one of the titular churches of Rome to which Cardinal Priests of the Roman Catholic Church may be appointed. It was established as a titular church in 1988 by Pope John Paul II for Cardinal James Hickey, Archbishop of Washington.

The church is named for Mary, Mother of Jesus. It is located in the Tor Bella Monaca section of Rome, in Municipio VIII.

The present Cardinal Priest of this Titular Church is Joseph Zen, SDB, the Diocesan Bishop emeritus of the Diocese of Hong Kong in China. On 24 March 2006 Pope Benedict XVI elevated him to the dignity of a Cardinal Priest assigned to the above titular church.

Pope Francis was scheduled to visit the church (stopping beforehand briefly at the Church of Santa Giovanna Antida) in a pastoral visit on the Third Sunday of Lent, Sunday, 8 March 2015, in the afternoon, to preside at Mass and give the homily.
