= Santa Maria del Monte Carmelo a Mostacciano =

- Blessed Virgin Mary of Mount Carmel in Mostacciano (in English); Beatæ Mariaæ Virginis de Monte Carmelo in Mostacciano (in Latin)
- Click on the map for a fullscreen view
- 41°48′32″N 12°26′41″E
- Location: Piazza Beata Vergine del Carmelo 10, Rome
- Country: Italy
- Denomination: Roman Catholic
- Tradition: Roman Rite
- Website: Official website

History
- Status: Titular church
- Dedication: Mary, mother of Jesus (Our Lady of Mount Carmel)
- Consecrated: 1986

Architecture
- Architect: Giuseppe Spina
- Architectural type: Church
- Style: Modernist
- Completed: 1986

Administration
- District: Lazio
- Province: Rome

The Church of Blessed Virgin Mary of Mount Carmel is a church located in Diocese of Rome, Torrino Area, locality of Mostacciano in Beata Maria Virgine del Carmelo Piazza.

Pope John Paul II instituted it as the seat of cardinal title of Beatæ Mariæ Virginis de Monte Carmelo in Mostacciano.

== List of Cardinal Protectors ==
- John Baptist Wu Cheng-chung 28 June 1988 – 23 September 2002
- Anthony Okogie 21 October 2003 – present
