= John Tong Hon =

Roman Catholic cardinal

His Eminence John Tong Hon
- Cardinal; Bishop Emeritus of Hong Kong
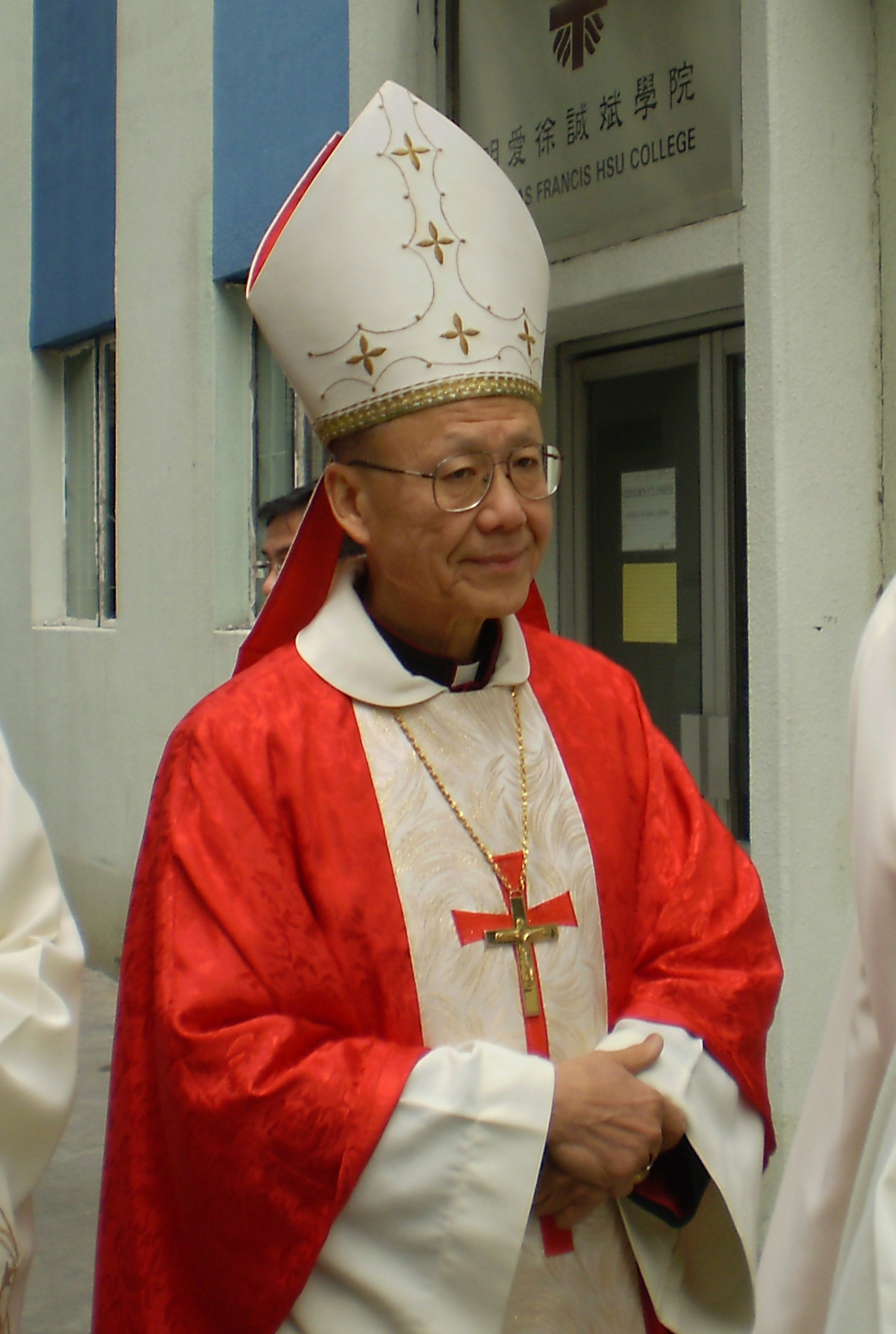
- Tong in 2008
- Church: Catholic Church
- Province: Canton (nominal); Directly subject to the Holy See (in practice)
- See: Hong Kong
- Appointed: 30 January 2008 (as coadjutor bishop)
- Installed: 15 April 2009
- Term ended: 1 August 2017
- Predecessor: Joseph Zen, S.D.B.
- Successor: Michael Yeung
- Other posts: Cardinal-Priest of Regina degli Apostoli alla Montagnola (2012–present); Member of Council for the Economy (2014–present)
- Previous posts: Vicar General of the Diocese of Hong Kong (1992–2008); Auxiliary Bishop of Hong Kong (1996–2008); Titular Bishop of Bossa (1996–2008); Coadjutor Bishop of Hong Kong (2008–2009); Apostolic Administrator of Hong Kong (2019–2021)

Orders
- Ordination: 6 January 1966 by Pope Paul VI
- Consecration: 9 December 1996 by John Baptist Wu
- Created cardinal: 18 February 2012 by Pope Benedict XVI
- Rank: Cardinal-Priest

Personal details
- Born: 31 July 1939 (age 87) Central, British Hong Kong
- Denomination: Roman Catholic
- Residence: Hong Kong
- Education: Chinese University of Hong Kong; Pontifical Urbaniana University
- Motto: Dominus Pastor Meus 主為我牧 (English: The Lord is my Shepherd)
- Coat of arms: John Tong Hon's coat of arms

Styles of John Tong Hon
- Reference style: His Eminence
- Spoken style: Your Eminence
- Religious style: Cardinal
- Posthumous style: none
- Informal style: Cardinal

John Tong Hon
- Traditional Chinese: 湯漢
- Simplified Chinese: 汤汉
- Cantonese Yale: Tòng Hon
- Jyutping: Tong^{1} Hon^{3}
Transcriptions
Standard Mandarin
- Hanyu Pinyin: Tàng Hàn
- Wade–Giles: T'ang^{4} Han^{4}
- Yale Romanization: Tàng Hàn
Hakka
- Romanization: Tong^{44} Hon^{52}
Yue: Cantonese
- Yale Romanization: Tòng Hon
- Jyutping: Tong^{1} Hon^{3}
- IPA: [tɔ̄ːŋ hɔ̄ːn]

Ordination history of John Tong Hon
History
Priestly ordination
- Ordained by: Pope Paul VI
Episcopal consecration
- Principal consecrator: John Baptist Wu (Hong Kong)
- Co-consecrators: Peter Shirayanagi (Tokyo); Charles Asa Schleck (Adj. Sec. Sacr. Cong. Prop. Fide)
Cardinalate
- Elevated by: Pope Benedict XVI
Episcopal succession
Bishops consecrated by John Tong Hon as principal consecrator
- Michael Yeung: 30 August 2014
- Stephen Lee: 30 August 2014
- Joseph Ha: 30 August 2014
- Stephen Chow: 4 December 2021

John Tong Hon (Chinese: 湯漢, born 31 July 1939) is a prelate of the Catholic Church from Hong Kong. A cardinal since 2012, he was auxiliary bishop of Hong Kong from 1996 to 2008, then coadjutor bishop of the diocese for a year, and Bishop of Hong Kong from 2009 to 2017. In January 2019, he became the apostolic administrator of the diocese, in a caretaker role, after the death of his successor, Michael Yeung.

== Biography ==
=== Early years ===
Tong was born on 31 July 1939 at 8 Staunton Street in Central, Hong Kong. In his youth, Tong Hon spent ten years living in Hwa County (Fa-yuen, Fa-yun; now Huadu), Guangdong, before returning to Hong Kong. His father died in China in 1952, at the age of 42.

Tong studied at the Seminário de São José, Macau (now part of the University of Saint Joseph) and later earned a master's degree in philosophy from the Chinese University of Hong Kong before earning both licentiate and a doctorate in dogmatic theology at the Pontifical Urbaniana University. He was ordained a priest on 6 January 1966. In December 1992, he was appointed as vicar general of the Diocese of Hong Kong, together with Dominic Chan. He served in this role until his appointment as coadjutor bishop in 2008.

=== Bishop ===
On 13 September 1996, he was appointed auxiliary bishop of Hong Kong. He was named consultor to the Congregation for the Evangelization of Peoples in 2003, after 24 years of service with their Holy Spirit Study Centre in Hong Kong.

On 30 January 2008, Pope Benedict XVI named him coadjutor bishop of the Hong Kong Diocese. He had been named by the church as being in line for Zen's job as early as 2006; however, he stated he felt little excitement at the prospect of taking up the post. He assumed the post of Bishop of Hong Kong on 15 April 2009 upon the retirement of Joseph Zen.

In 2010 as part of his Christmas message, Tong Hon called on the Chinese government to free Liu Xiaobo, activist Zhao Lianhai and all those who are in jail for promoting human rights. He also urged Beijing to release all the clergy from the underground church who are behind bars for demanding greater religious freedom in China. In his message, he expressed four dreams or aspirations he has for the future of his diocese, namely evangelisation, vocations, the Universal Church and acting as a bridge with the mainland.

=== Cardinal ===
On 18 February 2012 he was created Cardinal-Priest of Regina degli Apostoli alla Montagnola. He lost his voting rights in papal elections upon his 80th birthday. Regarding his elevation, Cardinal Tong said, "I feel inadequate yet grateful" and called the appointment both "an honour and a responsibility".

On 21 April 2012 Tong was appointed a member of the Congregation for the Evangelization of Peoples and the Pontifical Council for Inter Religious Dialogue. In October 2012 he served as one of three Presidents-General of the Synod of Bishops on the New Evangelization.

In 2013, Tong was one of the cardinal electors who participated and voted in the 2013 papal conclave, which elected Pope Francis.

In July 2014 Tong received three auxiliary bishops to assist him in the running of the diocese, Bishop Joseph Ha Chi-shing, O.F.M., Bishop Stephen Lee Bun-sang and Bishop Michael Yeung Ming-cheung. At the same time, Pope Francis asked Tong to remain Bishop of Hong Kong for three more years.

In 2015, when he would normally have participated in the Synod of Bishops as Hong Kong's representative, he was told that the Vatican could not make an exception for him and he would not be able to participate because he was older than 75, the standard retirement age for bishops.

His resignation was accepted on 1 August 2017.

=== Apostolic Administrator of Hong Kong ===
On 5 January 2019, the Congregation for the Evangelization of Peoples announced that Tong had been appointed Apostolic Administrator of the Diocese of Hong Kong, with the responsibility of governing it until further notice, following the unexpected death of Bishop Michael Yeung.

On 17 May 2021, Pope Francis appointed Fr. Stephen Chow Sau-yan, SJ, as the new Bishop of the Diocese of Hong Kong; Cardinal Tong's tenure as apostolic administrator thus ended on this date.

== Views ==
=== Holy See–China relations ===
Shortly after he was made a cardinal, Tong said that the diocese of Hong Kong would take up the role of "Bridge Church", and that the local church was helping the mainland church to have better formation, reconcile among themselves and achieve full communion with the Pope and the Catholic Church. He went on to call for prayers for "the reopening of the China-Vatican dialogue" and for "the graces bestowed upon the excommunicated, so that their early repentance could bring reconciliation in our Church and thus the wounds of our Church could be healed." Tong said that he is confident that "if Catholics in China were to enjoy full freedom of religious belief and activities, they would not only be able to contribute more fruitfully to the well-being of society, but would also earn for their Motherland a higher reputation in the international community."

In August 2016 Tong Hon revealed that the Holy See and Beijing had reached an initial agreement on the appointment of Catholic bishops in mainland China in an effort to secure a breakthrough in bilateral ties. In an article published in the latest edition of the weekly diocese publication Kung Kao Po, Tong Hon also dismissed criticism that Vatican officials may go against the Holy See's principles and that the dialogue may sacrifice the rights of clandestine churches on the mainland. Tong wrote that Beijing was now willing to reach an understanding with the Vatican on the appointment of bishops in the Catholic Church in mainland China and seek a mutually acceptable plan.

=== Opposition to LGBT rights ===
Tong Hon issued a pastoral letter in November 2015 urging Catholics to vote against candidates in the district council elections if they had liberal views on gay rights - including support for protections against discrimination and the legal recognition of same-sex marriage. He said that certain social movements were "challenging and twisting" core values on marriage and family, and had "shaken society to its core". In response to the letter, a number of students at the Catholic Caritas Institute of Higher Education in Tiu Keng Leng held a protest during a visit by Tong to a graduation ceremony.

Several pan-democratic parties criticised Tong's remarks. People Power lawmaker Raymond Chan Chi-chuen said, "The current pope has been calling for respect for the LGBT community. I do not understand why Tong would make such a comment at a time when worldwide Catholics are becoming increasingly liberal in handling the issue." A spokesman for the Labour Party also said that Tong's views differed from the remarks made by Pope Francis.

That same month Tong criticised the US Supreme Court decision in Obergefell v. Hodges which legalized same-sex marriage in the United States.

== See also ==
- Roman Catholicism in Hong Kong

Catholic Church titles
Preceded by Gabriel Lam; John Baptist Tsang	Vicar General of the Diocese of Hong Kong; 1992–2008; With: Dominic Chan (1992–2008)	Succeeded by Michael Yeung
Vacant Title last held by Peter Lei	Auxiliary Bishop of Hong Kong; 1996–2008	Vacant Title next held by Michael Yeung; Stephen Lee; Joseph Ha
Vacant Title last held by Joseph Zen	Coadjutor Bishop of Hong Kong; 2008–2009	Vacant Title next held by Michael Yeung
Preceded by Joseph Zen	Bishop of Hong Kong; 2009–2017	Succeeded by Michael Yeung
Vacant Title last held by Francis Hsu	Apostolic Administrator of Hong Kong; 2019–2021	Vacant
Preceded by Virgilio Noè	Cardinal-Priest of Regina degli Apostoli alla Montagnola; 2012–present	Incumbent
Preceded by Francisco Robles Ortega	— TITULAR — Bishop of Bossa; 1996–2008	Succeeded by Valter Dario Maggi
