= San Giovanni Battista de La Salle al Torrino =

- Church of Saint Jean-Baptiste de La Salle in Torrino
- Parrocchia San Giovanni Battista de La Salle
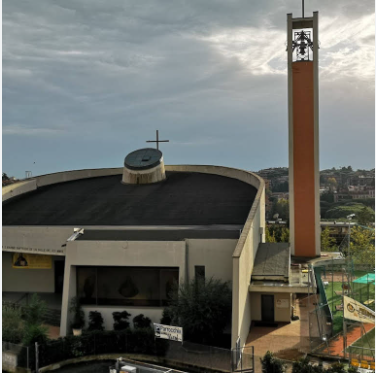

- Location within Rome
- 41°48′42″N 12°26′45″E
- Location: Via dell'Orsa Minore 59, Torrino, Rome
- Country: Italy
- Language: Italian
- Denomination: Catholic
- Tradition: Roman Rite
- Website: parrocchiadelasalle.it

History
- Status: titular church, parish church
- Dedication: Jean-Baptiste de La Salle
- Consecrated: 12 December 2009

Architecture
- Functional status: active
- Architect: Giuseppe Spina
- Architectural type: Modern
- Years built: 2007–09

Administration
- Diocese: Rome

San Giovanni Battista de La Salle al Torrino is a 21st-century parochial church and titular church on the southwest edge of Rome, dedicated to Jean-Baptiste de La Salle.

== History ==
The church was built in 2007–09 and designed by Giuseppe Spina. It features a 1960 mural painting by Mario Caffaro Rore which covers 60 m^{2} (650 sq ft) and depicts Jean-Baptiste de La Salle teaching children. Pope Benedict XVI celebrated Mass in the church in 2012. It claims relics of de la Salle, John Vianney, Jane Frances de Chantal and Pope John XXIII.

On 30 September 2023, Pope Francis made it a titular church to be held by a cardinal-priest.

Cardinal-protectors

- Stephen Chow (2023–present)
