= Pierre Lam =

Hong Kong film critic (born 1972/1973)

- 林震宇
- Born: Lam Chun-yue; 1972 or 1973 (age 52–53); Hong Kong
- Education: Hong Kong Baptist University (BSocSc); Chinese University of Hong Kong (MA)
- Occupation: Film critic

Lam Chun-yue (Chinese: 林震宇; born 1972/1973), also known by his pen name Pierre Lam (皮亞) is a Hong Kong film critic.

== Biography ==
Lam is a Vietnamese Chinese born in Hong Kong in 1972 or 1973. He graduated from the Department of Sociology at Hong Kong Baptist University, and later from the graduate school of Chinese University of Hong Kong, majoring in cultural studies. He started writing film reviews in 1997. He worked as editor of the Ming Pao's film page and went to New York University for a six-month crash course in filmmaking. Four years later, Lam made two films, Fall in Love Too Easily and The Cat of Hollywood. He competed for the New Currents Award at the 2004 Busan International Film Festival with The Cat of Hollywood. He was charged with indecent assault for allegedly molesting a woman at Wing Lee Building on Kimberley Road in Tsim Sha Tsui on 14 June 2018, but was acquitted in 5 September 2019 due to insufficient evidence. After being found not guilty, he said that he hoped it could come to an end so that he could focus on his work on film culture. He is now a lecturer at Hong Kong Baptist University College of International Education.
