= Chinese Vietnamese =

Chinese Vietnamese or Vietnamese Chinese may refer to:

== Language ==
- Sino-Vietnamese vocabulary, Chinese-derived vocabulary in the Vietnamese language
- Literary Chinese in Vietnam, a script for the Vietnamese language
- Chữ Nôm, an adaptation of Chinese characters used to write the Vietnamese language directly

== People ==
Ethnic Chinese in Vietnam:

- Hoa, Chinese who immigrated to Vietnam during the Qing dynasty and Republic of China period
- Ngái, rural-dwelling Hakka Chinese speakers, counted separately from the Hoa
- Chinese Nùng, rural-dwelling Hakka and Cantonese Chinese speakers who immigrated from China, counted separately from the Hoa and the Ngái

Vietnamese people in China:

- Gin people, one of the 55 officially recognised ethnic minorities of the People's Republic of China
- Vietnamese people in Hong Kong

== Relations between China and Vietnam ==
Typically in the hyphenated forms Chinese-Vietnamese or Vietnamese-Chinese:

- Any of the periods of Chinese rule in the history of Vietnam
  - First Chinese domination (History of Vietnam), 207 BC–39 AD
  - Second Chinese domination (History of Vietnam), 43–544
  - Third Chinese domination (History of Vietnam), 602–905
  - Fourth Chinese domination (History of Vietnam), 1407–1427
  - Sino-Vietnamese War of 1979
- People's Republic of China–Vietnam relations
