= Joseph Zen =

Chinese Catholic prelate (born 1932)

His Eminence Joseph Zen Ze-kiun SDB
- Cardinal, Bishop Emeritus of Hong Kong
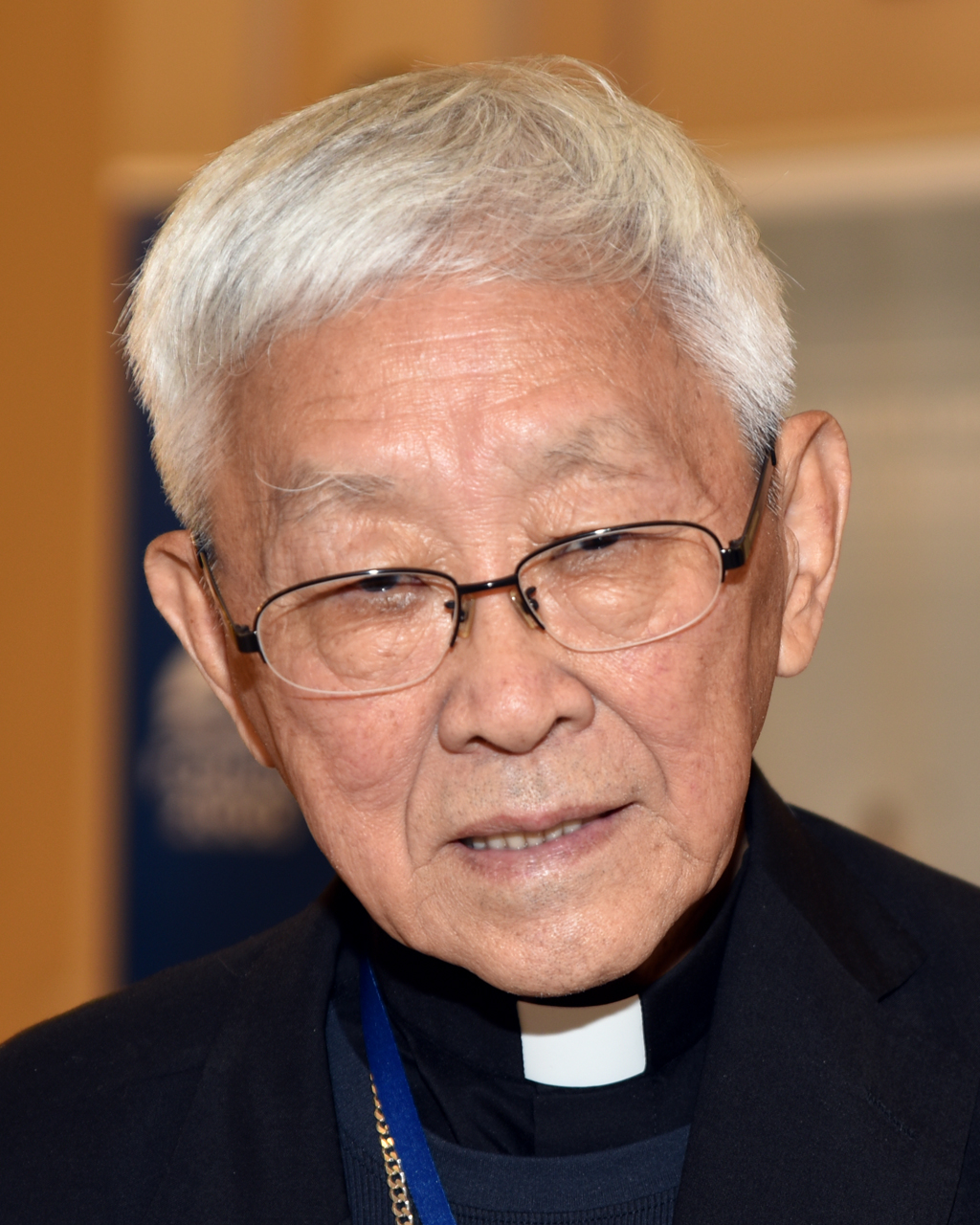
- Cardinal Zen in 2019
- Church: Catholic Church
- See: Hong Kong
- Installed: 23 September 2002
- Term ended: 15 April 2009
- Predecessor: John Baptist Wu
- Successor: John Tong
- Other post: Cardinal-Priest of Santa Maria Madre del Redentore a Tor Bella Monaca (2006–present)
- Previous post: Coadjutor Bishop of Hong Kong (1996–2002)

Orders
- Ordination: 11 February 1961 by Maurilio Fossati
- Consecration: 9 December 1996 by John Baptist Wu
- Created cardinal: 24 March 2006 by Pope Benedict XVI

Personal details
- Born: 13 January 1932 (age 94) Shanghai, China
- Denomination: Roman Catholicism
- Education: Salesian Pontifical University
- Motto: Ipsi Cura Est (English: "He cares")
- Coat of arms: Joseph Zen Ze-kiun's coat of arms

Styles of Joseph Zen
- Reference style: His Eminence
- Spoken style: Your Eminence
- Informal style: Cardinal
- See: Hong Kong (Emeritus)

Joseph Zen
- Traditional Chinese: 陳日君
- Simplified Chinese: 陈日君
Transcriptions
Standard Mandarin
- Hanyu Pinyin: Chén Rìjūn
- Wade–Giles: Ch'en^{2} Jih^{4}chün^{1}
- Yale Romanization: Chén R̀jyūn
- IPA: [ʈʂʰə̌n ɻɻ̩̂tɕýn]
Wu
- Romanization: [zəɲ zəʔ tɕyəɲ]
Hakka
- Romanization: Cin^{2} Ngit^{5} Giun^{1}
Yue: Cantonese
- Yale Romanization: Chàhn Yahtgwān
- Jyutping: can^{4} jat^{6} gwan^{1}
- IPA: [tsʰɐ̏n jɐ̀tkʷɐ́n]

Ordination history of Joseph Zen
History
Priestly ordination
- Ordained by: Maurilio Fossati (Turin)
- Date: 11 February 1961
- Place: Turin, Italy
Episcopal consecration
- Principal consecrator: John Baptist Wu (Hong Kong)
- Co-consecrators: Peter Shirayanagi (Tokyo); Charles Asa Schleck (Adj. Sec. Sacr. Cong. Prop. Fide)
- Date: 9 December 1996
- Place: Cathedral of the Immaculate Conception, British Hong Kong
Cardinalate
- Elevated by: Pope Benedict XVI
- Date: 24 March 2006
Episcopal succession
Bishops consecrated by Joseph Zen as principal consecrator
- Luciano Capelli: 21 October 2007

Joseph Zen Ze-kiun, SDB (Chinese: 陳日君, born 13 January 1932) is a Chinese Catholic prelate who served as Bishop of Hong Kong from 2002 to 2009. He was made a cardinal by Pope Benedict XVI in 2006 and has been outspoken on issues regarding human rights, political freedom, and religious liberty. He is a member of the Salesians of Don Bosco.

Zen's strong ties with Hong Kong's pro-democracy camp often attract criticism from the pro-Beijing camp and the government of China. Zen retired on 15 April 2009, but remains a strong pro-democracy influence in Hong Kong. On 11 May 2022, he was arrested by the National Security Police and later that day released on bail.

== Life and career ==
Joseph Zen was born in Shanghai to Catholic parents, Vincent Zen and Margaret Tseu. He studied in a church school during the Second Sino-Japanese War, but was sent to an abbey after his father suffered a stroke.

After entering the Salesians at the Hong Kong novitiate in 1948, he was ordained to the priesthood on 11 February 1961 by Cardinal Maurilio Fossati. Zen obtained a licentiate in theology (1961) and a doctorate in philosophy (1964) from the Salesian Pontifical University in Rome. After 1973, he taught in the Holy Spirit Seminary College of Hong Kong – 1976 to 1978 of Macao Salesian School (Instituto Salesiano) as principal. In 1978 he became the Provincial Superior of Salesians (which includes mainland China, Hong Kong, Macau, and Taiwan), then resigned in 1983. He was a lecturer in the seminaries in China, centres of studies acknowledged by the Communist party, between 1989 and 1996. He was appointed the coadjutor Bishop of Hong Kong in 1996 by Pope John Paul II.

=== Retirement ===
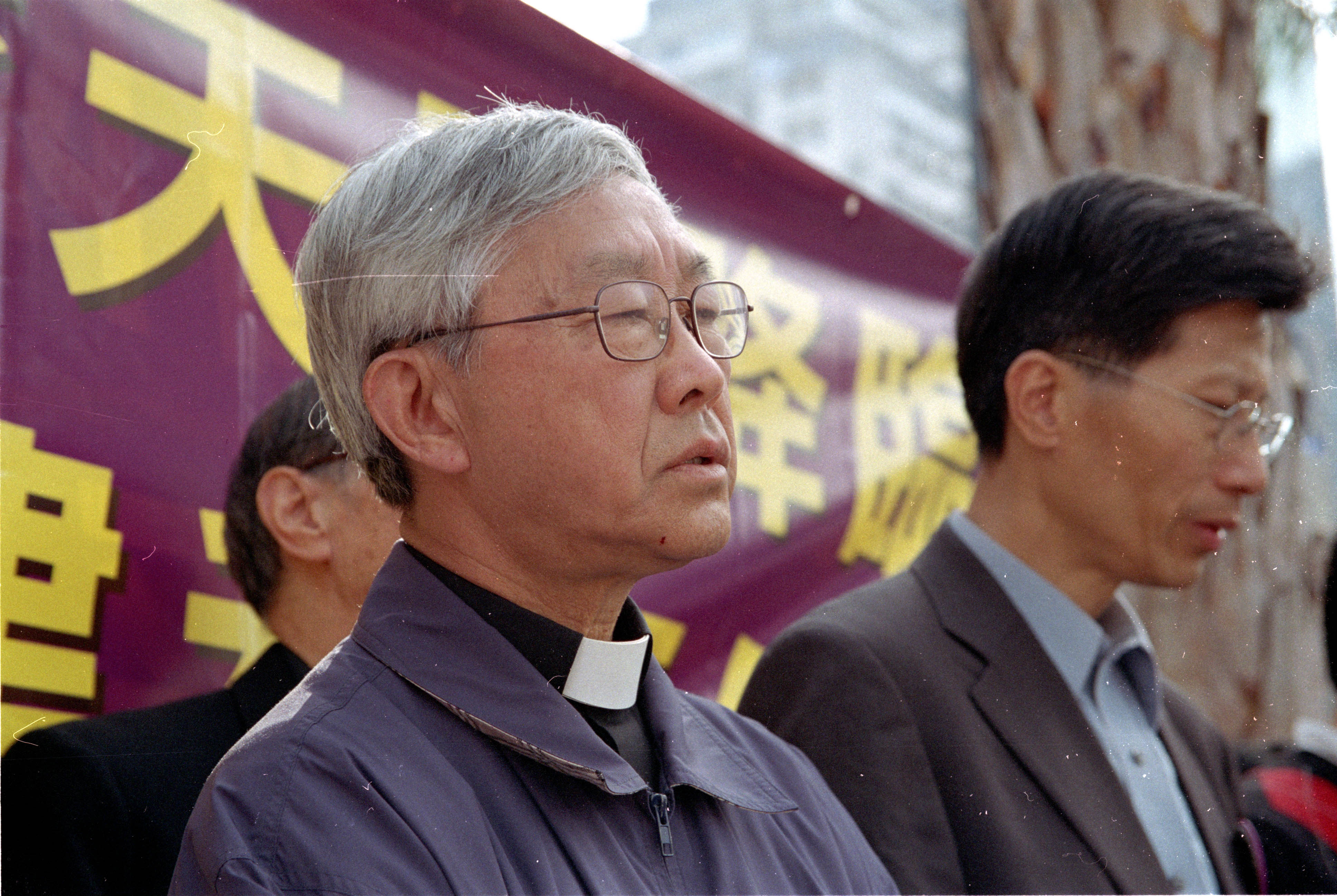
Bishop Joseph Zen prayed with Catholics before the protest against Hong Kong Basic Law Article 23 legislation

On 18 September 2005, he told Hong Kong newspaper Apple Daily reporters that he was willing to retire in January 2007. He also said that he wanted to be a teacher in either mainland China or in Africa, as there was a shortage of teachers in Africa. Democratic Party ex-chairman Martin Lee, also a Roman Catholic, stated that because Zen was still healthy for his age, the Pope may request him to stay in his position. Legislative Council member Audrey Eu praised Zen for being braver than other religious leaders in Hong Kong in sharing his political views and also because "he carried out his ideas of fairness, equitableness, and philanthropy via actual efforts". On the other hand, some conservatives inside the church speculated that the strained relationship between Beijing and the Holy See will become more relaxed if Zen retires. Nonetheless, Zen wrote a letter to the Pope on 13 January 2006 and stated that he did want to retire from his position, though not because of his age. On 15 April 2009, Pope Benedict accepted Zen's resignation and John Tong Hon became the bishop of the diocese.

From 22 October 2011 for three days Zen went on hunger strike which was undertaken as an act of protest against losing a long-standing legal battle with the Hong Kong government over how aided schools should be run. He later wrote about his experiences in an open letter.

=== Cardinalate ===
Coat of Arms of Cardinal Zen. The motto is Ipsi cura est is from 1 Peter 5:7. In English it says: "He cares."

On 22 February 2006, the Vatican announced that Zen would be elevated to the College of Cardinals by Pope Benedict XVI in the consistory on 24 March 2006. Zen, who was created Cardinal-Priest of Santa Maria Madre del Redentore a Tor Bella Monaca, saw his elevation as indication of how much the Pope values the Church in China. He was named a member of the Congregation for Divine Worship and the Discipline of the Sacraments.

Zen's elevation was welcomed by Catholics in Hong Kong as it was seen as a recognition of his stance on social justice and as an honour for the church in Hong Kong. Vicar General Dominic Chan Chi-ming said that it would be an honour to have a cardinal to once again head the diocese. Rev. Louis Ha Ke-loon said it shows that the Pope feels that Zen should speak out. Democrat legislator Martin Lee added that it was good news because no matter whether he is a bishop or a cardinal, as a religious leader Zen speaks as moral voice of the people.

At the time of his elevation, Zen was the only Chinese cardinal eligible to participate in papal conclaves.

Zen offered a Pontifical High Mass in the Tridentine Rite in May 2006, for which he was thanked by traditionalist Catholics around the world.

Pope Benedict XVI named Zen to write the meditations for the Stations of the Cross led by the Pope at the Roman Colisseum on Good Friday, 21 March 2008.

In August 2023, Cardinal Brandmüller, along with Cardinals Burke, Íñiguez, Sarah, and Zen, submitted another list of five dubia to Pope Francis related to the upcoming Synod on Synodality. The Dubia questioned the necessity of the upcoming synod, asked whether the blessing of same-sex unions was theologically admissible, and questioned the Pope's claim that "forgiveness is a human right".

Zen criticized some of Pope Francis' responses to the five dubia, saying that the Pope's guidance on the blessing of same-sex unions is "pastorally untenable."

== Relations with the People's Republic of China ==
In October 2011, Zen said that he had received HK$20 million from Hong Kong tycoon Jimmy Lai since 2005, which went to helping the underground Church and the poor on the mainland.

In 2014 Cardinal Zen asked Pope Francis not to visit China, saying the pontiff would be “manipulated”. In an interview he told the Italian newspaper Corriere della Sera: “I would tell him now, ‘Don’t come, you would be manipulated'. The few courageous [Catholics] could not meet [the Pope], and the Communist Party would show him the illegitimate bishops, including the three excommunicated ones.” The comments came as ties between the Vatican and China improved in the early days of the pontificate of Francis, with the Chinese Ministry of Foreign Affairs congratulating Francis on his election. Cardinal Zen said he did not see signs of dialogue happening between the Catholic Church and China. “Even if under these conditions Beijing was to extend a hand, it would be a trick under these circumstances,” he said. “Our poor bishops are slaves, the Communist Party denies them respect, tries to take away their dignity.”

In September 2014 as part of the 2014 Hong Kong protests, Cardinal Zen addressed the protesters saying "It's high time we really showed that we want to be free and not to be slaves. We must unite together". During his speech protesters were fired on with tear gas and he asked them to disperse.

In a 2018 interview, Cardinal Zen, on Sino-Holy See relations, said “Pope Francis does not know the real Communist Party in China, but Parolin should know. He was there [in the Secretariat of State] so many years, so he must know. He may be happy to encourage the pope to be optimistic about the negotiations … but that’s dangerous. Pope Francis needs someone to calm him down from his enthusiasm.” Zen added that “It seems the Secretary of State wants to have a solution anyway. He is so optimistic. That’s dangerous. I told the pope that he [Parolin] has a poisoned mind. He is very sweet, but I have no trust in this person. He believes in diplomacy, not in our faith.”

In 2019, Zen responded to Cardinal Filoni's weeklong trip to Hong Kong, Taiwan, and Macau. Cardinal Filoni said that the provisional agreement between Beijing and the Holy See signed in 2018 “will be a very good thing for the Church in the future, and also for China.” Zen suggested that “One wonders: from which planet did our leaders in Rome descend?” Zen, the emeritus bishop of Hong Kong, responded on his blog on 5 March. Zen added that “The incredible thing is the invitation to trust the government! Is information on recent oppression measures missing from our superiors in the Vatican?” Zen later expressed a desire to tell Pope Francis that the pontiff's actions were "encouraging a schism" by "legitimizing the schismatic church in China."

During the 2019–2020 Hong Kong protests, Zen criticized Pope Francis after he was quoted as saying that he loved China and would like to visit and condemned his lack of stance against China.

On May 11, 2022, Hong Kong police arrested Zen and four others who helped run the disbanded 612 Humanitarian Relief Fund for protesters, all on the charge of "collusion with foreign forces". The others who were arrested were senior barrister Margaret Ng, activist and pop singer Denise Ho, former lawmaker Cyd Ho, and former academic Hui Po-keung. Zen was held and questioned in Chai Wan police station close to his church residence. Zen was released on bail and had his passport confiscated after interrogation.

After his initial arrest, the Holy See press office stated that they were concerned and following the situation closely. Karine Jean-Pierre called upon the PRC to immediately release Zen and the others arrested, and former U.S. Congressman Dan Lipinski attacked the Chinese government over the move. American bishops Thomas Joseph Tobin and Joseph Strickland both called for prayers for Zen's release. In the U.K., British minister James Cleverly called the arrests unacceptable in a statement given before Parliament. Vatican's Secretary of State Pietro Parolin said the arrest of Zen should not be read as disavowal of Sino-Vatican agreement.

On 24 April 2025, following the death of Pope Francis, Zen was allowed to leave Hong Kong to attend his funeral on 26 April.

== Views ==
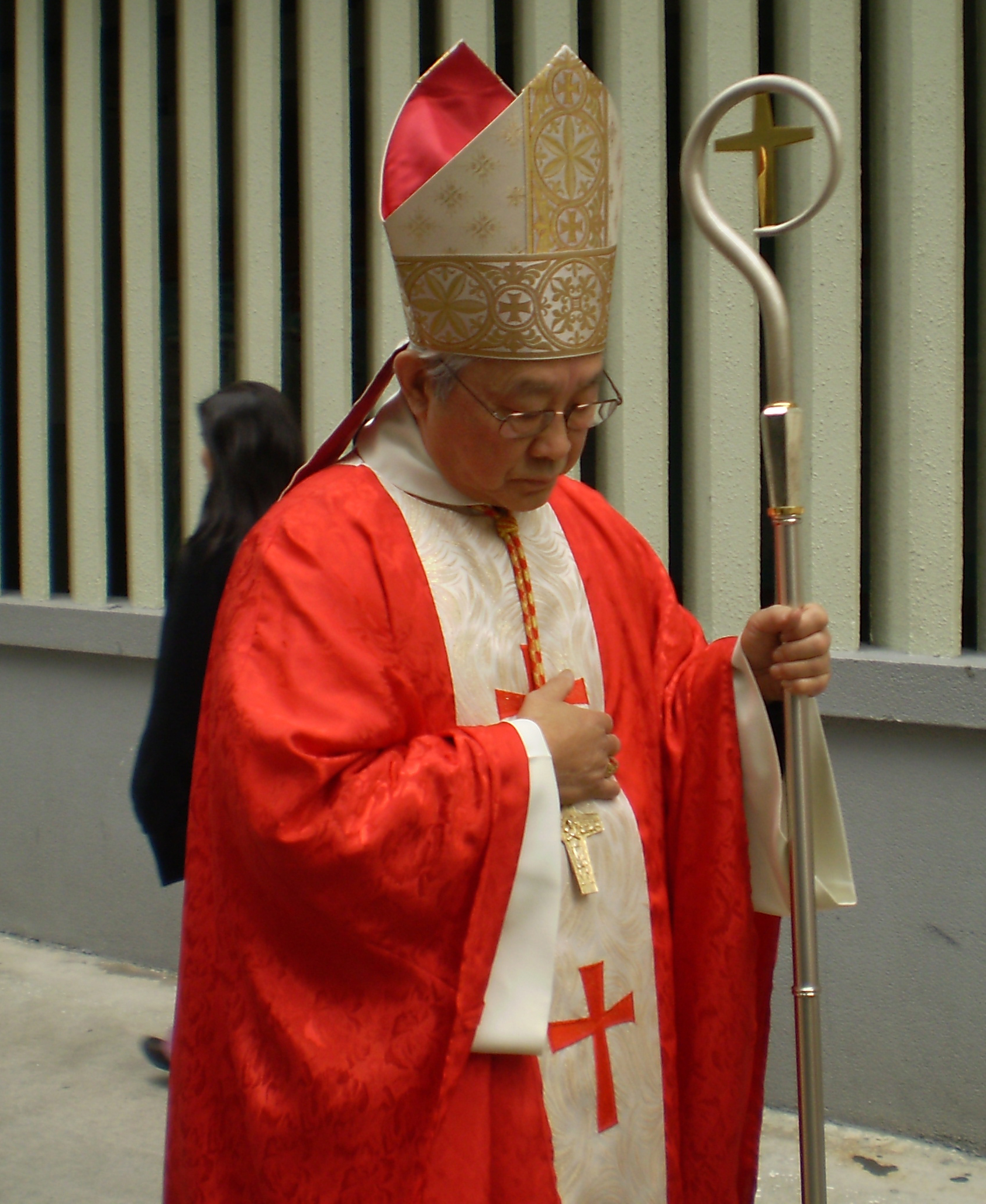
Cardinal Zen in his episcopal attire in 2008

=== Advocacy for democracy ===
After he succeeded as Bishop of Hong Kong on 23 September 2002, he led the Diocese in voicing reservations about the proposed anti-subversion laws, required under Article 23 of the Basic Law. He was worried that these laws, if enacted without a thorough consultation process including a white paper, could easily lead to future violations of basic civil rights.

On 1 July 2003, he took part in a prayer gathering at Victoria Park before the 1 July March began. Many Christians, including Catholics and those of other denominations, attended the demonstration.

Cardinal Zen attended the 4 June 2006 Prayer gathering in memory of the victims of the 1989 massacre. He asked the Chinese government to let the Chinese people freely discuss the 1989 Tiananmen Square protests. In September 2023 he also attended the trial of pro-democracy media tycoon and founder of influential tabloid Apple Daily Jimmy Lai.

=== Education reform controversies ===
On 5 June 2005, Zen announced that if the Legislative Council passed a proposal to support the schools to create incorporated management committees on 8 July 2005, he would appeal against the decision to the court. The Education (Amendment) Bill 2002, once enacted, would likely play down the role of the Church in running Catholic schools and in promoting Catholic education. However, after the Government gave up some argued points in the motion, the Diocese decided to support the motion, though the Diocese later announced plans to prosecute the Government on 28 September 2005.

After two teachers committed suicide in early January 2006, Zen said that these acts must be due to the educational reforms and he asked the government to halt new reforms. Then Permanent Secretary for Education and Manpower Fanny Law rejected causal connections, but provoked furor among teachers and the public when she questioned why only two teachers committed suicide because of the reforms. She apologised for her "inappropriate" remarks on 10 January.

=== Tridentine Mass ===
In 2021, Zen criticized Pope Francis's motu proprio Traditionis custodes, stating that "Many tendentious generalizations in the documents [of the motu proprio] have hurt the hearts of many good people more than expected." He added that he believed that many people who had been hurt by the restrictions "have never given the smallest reason to be suspected of not accepting the liturgical reform of the [Second Vatican Council]."

=== WTO affairs ===
On 18 December 2005, Zen visited protesters at the 2005 WTO Ministerial Conference and tried to visit the detained South Korean Catholics, including two priests and a nun. He criticised the Hong Kong police for their treatment of the protesters. About one month later, several unions in Hong Kong Police Force decided to write a letter to the Pope to complain about Zen's speech. Zen replied that some policemen were "sycophantic to the senior officers inside the police force".

== Bibliography ==
- Way of the Cross with Pope Benedict XVI (2009)
- L'agnello e il dragone: Dialoghi su Cina e Cristianesimo (2016) - "The lamb and the dragon: Dialogues on China and Christianity"
- 為了熙雍，我決不緘默 (2018) - "For Zion, I will not remain silent"
- For Love of My People I Will Not Remain Silent: On the Situation of the Church in China (2019). San Francisco: Ignatius Press. ISBN 978-1621643142
- Cardinal Zen's Lenten Reflections (2024). Bedford, NH: Sophia Institute Press. ISBN 979-8889110767

== See also ==
- Roman Catholicism in Hong Kong

Catholic Church titles
Vacant Title last held by Lorenzo Bianchi	Coadjutor Bishop of Hong Kong; 1996–2002	Vacant Title next held by John Tong Hon
Preceded by John Baptist Wu	Bishop of Hong Kong; 2002–2009	Succeeded by John Tong Hon
Preceded by James Aloysius Hickey	Cardinal-Priest of Santa Maria Madre del Redentore a Tor Bella Monaca; 2006–present	Incumbent
