= John Baptist Wu =

Fifth Roman Catholic bishop of Hong Kong

His Eminence John Baptist Wu Cheng-chung
- Cardinal-Priest of Santa Maria del Monte Carmelo a Mostacciano; Bishop of Hong Kong
- Diocese: Hong Kong
- Appointed: 5 April 1975
- Installed: 25 July 1975
- Term ended: 23 September 2002
- Predecessor: Peter Lei
- Successor: Joseph Zen
- Other post: Cardinal-Priest of Santa Maria del Monte Carmelo a Mostacciano (1988–2002)

Orders
- Ordination: 6 July 1952
- Consecration: 25 July 1975 by Agnelo Rossi
- Created cardinal: 29 June 1988 by Pope John Paul II

Personal details
- Born: 26 May 1925 Wuhua, Meizhou, Guangdong, China
- Died: 23 September 2002 (aged 77) Queen Mary Hospital, Pok Fu Lam, Hong Kong
- Buried: St. Michael's Cemetery, Happy Valley, Hong Kong (until 2022); Chapel of St. Anthony, Cathedral of the Immaculate Conception, Hong Kong (from 2022)
- Coat of arms: John Baptist Wu Cheng-chung's coat of arms

Ordination history of John Baptist Wu
History
Priestly ordination
- Date: 6 July 1952
- Place: Cathedral of the Immaculate Conception, British Hong Kong
Episcopal consecration
- Principal consecrator: Agnelo Rossi (Pref. Sacr. Cong. Prop. Fide)
- Co-consecrators: Petrus Tou Pao-zin (Hsinchu); Frederick Anthony Donaghy (Wuzhou)
- Date: 25 July 1975
- Place: Cathedral of the Immaculate Conception, British Hong Kong
Cardinalate
- Elevated by: Pope John Paul II
- Date: 28 June 1988
Episcopal succession
Bishops consecrated by John Baptist Wu as principal consecrator
- Arquimínio Rodrigues da Costa: 25 March 1976
- Joseph Zen: 9 December 1996
- John Tong Hon: 9 December 1996

Styles of John Baptist Wu Cheng-chung
- Reference style: His Eminence
- Spoken style: Your Eminence
- Religious style: Cardinal
- Informal style: Cardinal
- See: Hong Kong

John Baptist Wu
- Traditional Chinese: 胡振中
- Simplified Chinese: 胡振中
Transcriptions
Standard Mandarin
- Hanyu Pinyin: Hú Zhènzhōng
Hakka
- Romanization: Fu Ziin-Zung
Yue: Cantonese
- Yale Romanization: Wu Cheng-chung

John Baptist Wu Cheng-chung (Chinese: 胡振中; Cantonese Yale: Wu Cheng-chung; 26 March 1925 – 23 September 2002) was the fifth Roman Catholic bishop of Hong Kong and the first cardinal from that diocese. He was a member of the Congregation for the Evangelization of Peoples, the Pontifical Council for Social Communications and the Congregation for Divine Worship and the Discipline of the Sacraments.

== Biography ==
A Hakka, Wu was born in the village of Ho Hau, Wu-hua (Province of Guangdong, Diocese of Kai-ying). Baptized in the village's parish church, he received his primary education there. He joined the diocesan minor seminary of Ka-ying for his secondary education in 1940 and was ordained in 1952.

He was appointed the fifth Bishop of the Hong Kong Catholic Diocese by Pope Paul VI as successor to Bishop Peter Lei Wang-kei who had died on 23 July 1974. He arrived in Hong Kong and on 25 July was consecrated and installed as Bishop of the Hong Kong in the Cathedral of the Immaculate Conception in 1975.

After due preparation, he initiated a Diocesan Renewal Movement for priests, laity and religious. On 25 March 1985, he led a five-member delegation on a seven-day visit to Beijing and Shanghai, at the invitation of the National Bureau of Religious Affairs under the State Council of China. He was the first bishop of Hong Kong to visit the mainland China. Later on 21 January 1986, he led a seven-member delegation on a ten-day visit to Guangzhou and the eastern part of his home Province, Guangdong, at the invitation of the Bureau of Religious Affairs of that Province. This visit marked the first reunion with his 85-year-old mother, after a separation of 40 years.

On 29 May 1988, Wu was named a Cardinal by Pope John Paul II. He was the first Cardinal from Hong Kong.

After the Tiananmen Square protests of 1989, on 11 July 1989, he wrote a letter to all the bishops in the world, requesting them to appeal for justice, order and democracy in China.

On 1 September 1991, Wu issued a pastoral letter that exhorting the faithful to give full support to the direct elections to the Legislative Council, the first time in the history of Hong Kong, on 15 September. In 1999, he convoked the "Diocesan Synod" to meet the pastoral needs of the Third Millennium.

He died of cancer and diabetes on 23 September 2002 at Queen Mary Hospital in Hong Kong, aged 77. He was buried in St. Michael's Catholic Cemetery, Happy Valley.

In September 2022, twenty years after his death, Wu's remains were exhumed and re-interred in the crypt of the Cathedral of the Immaculate Conception.

== See also ==
- Roman Catholic Diocese of Hong Kong

Catholic Church titles
Preceded by Peter Lei	Bishop of Hong Kong; 1975–2002	Succeeded by Joseph Zen
New creation	Cardinal-Priest of Santa Maria del Monte Carmelo a Mostacciano; 1988–2002	Succeeded by Anthony Olubunmi Okogie
